= Vapor Technology Association =

American trade association

- Abbreviation: VTA
- Formation: 2015; 11 years ago
- Type: Trade association
- Tax ID no.: 47-4938352
- Legal status: 501(c)(6) organization
- Region served: United States
- Members: 800
- Executive director: Tony Abboud
- Affiliations: Global Vape Alliance (founder)
- Revenue: US$15.0 million (2024)
- Expenses: US$15.8 million (2024)
- Website: vaportechnology.org

The Vapor Technology Association is an American trade group that represents companies in the vaping industry.

== Overview ==
The Vapor Technology Association (VTA) was formed by a group of vaping companies in 2015, timed to combat new federal regulations against the industry. The VTA has around 800 member businesses.

The group is a 501(c)(6) organization, according to its tax returns. The VTA is a founder of the Global Vape Alliance. The UK Vaping Industry Association and the Independent European Vape Alliance are members.

According to the VTA, the nicotine vapor industry generates $17.5 billion in economic output in the United States. The industry employs over 90,000 people in America and generates $5.5 billion in wages and benefits.

== Leadership ==
Tony Abboud is the executive director of the VTA and is a vaping industry lobbyist, based in Illinois. Abboud graduated from the University of Iowa College of Law and has a bachelor's degree from Carleton College. He has experience working in Democratic politics, having worked on the campaign of Pat Quinn, a liberal Democrat former governor of Illinois.

In 2024, VTA paid $0 in salaries, but it paid $660,670 to Strategic Government Solutions, which, according to the VTA's own tax return, was to pay for Tony Abboud as executive director.

== Finances ==
In 2024 the VTA took in $15 million in revenue and had $15.8 million in expenses. Its total assets at the end of 2024 were $402,000. According to its 2024 tax return the VTA has zero employees and eight volunteers. It paid $11.9 million to Forward Global, a risk management and consulting agency, as an independent contractor for consulting services.

Its main source of revenue in 2024 was $11.9 million in contributions, gifts, and grants, and $3.1 million in membership dues, according to its tax return. Its lobbyist in 2024 was Phelps Barry & Associates, to which it paid $352,500, with total lobbying expenditures of $4,470,314 that year. It also spent $1.64 million on political activity expenditures.

== Advocacy ==
Despite some government bans on flavored vaping products, the VTA advocates for flavored vape products, saying that "studies have shown that the availability of flavors is perhaps the single most important factor for those who successfully quit cigarettes by switching to vaping." The VTA's position on bans of flavored vapes are that such restrictions are "shortsighted."

The VTA insists that youth in America aren't using vapor products, referring to the FDA's 2025 National Youth Tobacco Survey. Abboud has blamed former U.S. president Joe Biden for "attempting to shut down and bankrupt American vape companies across the country."

During the 2024 U.S. election, Abboud donated to Republican Senate candidates. A few weeks before the presidential election he met with Donald Trump to ask for favorable policies for the vaping industry. Earlier that year, VTA leaders and Abboud attended the Republican National Convention in 2024 when Trump was nominated for his second term.

The VTA has pressured the Trump administration as well as several states to oppose bills that would crack down on Chinese vaping companies.

== Lawsuit against New York ==
The VTA was a lead petitioner representing roughly 800 member businesses in a lawsuit against New York, and it won a statewide injunction blocking a ban on flavored e-liquids.

In 2019 New York Governor Andrew Cuomo announced a ban on flavored e-cigarettes in New York that he would implement via an executive action. On the following day the health commissioner and the Public Health and Health Planning Council announced that they would issue an emergency regulation to carry out Cuomo's orders, taking public comments for 1 day before issuing an emergency regulation, 10 NYCRR § 9-3. The new emergency regulation banned the manufacture, possession, or sale of flavored e-liquids, regardless of whether they contain nicotine, giving exceptions for tobacco flavor, menthol flavor, and flavorless e-liquids.

In response the VTA, along with two vape companies, sued the state. The plaintiffs successfully convinced a state judge to issue an injunction in January 2020, pausing the new regulations until the case plays out in court.

== The VTA and federal policy on flavored vapes ==
During Donald Trump's first term his administration tried to combat the rising popularity of flavored vaping products and moved to ban non-tobacco flavored e-cigarettes in 2019. In his 2024 campaign for president, Trump vowed to "save vaping".

Under President Joe Biden, the FDA banned virtually all flavored e-cigarettes manufactured in China.

According to the FDA the number of middle school and high school students who say they vape dropped from 2.13 million kids in 2023 to 1.63 million in 2024. In May 2026 the FDA made two significant changes to its enforcement and approval of vaping products. First, it approved some flavored vapes for the first time, including fruit flavors. Second, it chose not to crack down on the many unauthorized vapes still in the marketplace while their applications sit in a backlog. Abboud told The Hill newspaper that the changes are "a Band-Aid, not a fix," and does not mean those products will ever get authorized, while the American Lung Association spoke out and "condemned" the decision.

== Chinese imports and enforcement ==
The Trump administration in 2025 launched an effort to reduce the number of Chinese vapes entering the U.S. market. In April 2025 China exported around 7.8 million kg worth of vapes and electronic cigarettes into the United States. The following month that figure went down to 4.7 million kg.

In the fiscal 2026 agriculture appropriations bill, Congress gave regulators the authority to seize and destroy unauthorized shipments of vapes at U.S. ports without going through court review. Congress appropriated nearly $200 million for enforcement, the largest ever directed at illegal e-cigarettes. By the middle of 2026 the federal government reported that it had intercepted an estimated 18 million devices with a street value of $175 million. Nearly all those devices were shipped from China.

One of the most popular illegal Chinese vape products in the United States is Geek Vape, the maker of the Geek Bar. In 2024 over $600 million worth of products from Geek Vape were sold in convenience stores and supermarkets in the United States.

To get around the FDA ban Chinese manufacturers began using synthetic nicotine analogs in their vaping products. One of the analogs is called 6-methyl nicotine and is marketed under names such as Nixodine and Metatine. The products with the nicotine analogs have gained popularity as a way for companies to avoid federal pre-market review requirements for nicotine-containing products. One of the VTA's board member companies, Bongaurd Naturals, manufacturers Nixodine.

In July 2025 the VTA ran TV ads stating its opposition to illegally imported Chinese vapes. The group spent "seven figures" on the ad campaign. However, the VTA has received large amounts of money from the manufacturers of illegally imported Chinese vapes. VTA board members "profit from their sale," according to the Washington Examiner.

== Alleged ties to the Chinese Communist Party ==
Fox News Digital reported that Abboud has extensive ties to the Chinese Communist Party, visiting government officials in China several times.

According to Fox News, the VTA has a close relationship with the Electronic Cigarette Industry Committee (ECCC) of the China Electronics Chamber of Commerce, which is an entity of the Chinese Communist Party (CCP). The ECCC was created in Shenzhen, China in 2017. The China Electronics Chamber of Commerce (CECC) is registered with the CCP's Ministry of Civil Affairs of the People's Republic of China. Some of the top leaders of the CECC are former high-ranking members of the CCP.

The ECCC has said that their goal is for Chinese domination and price control in the vaping market.

VTA board members, including Demand Vape owner Jon Glauser and Geoff Habicht, CEO of Mi-Pod, have ties to China, according to Fox. Mi-Pod imports vape juices from China. The ranking Democrat of the House Select Committee on the Chinese Communist Party wrote in a letter to Mi-Pod, warning them that they were importing vape products that were banned for domestic sale in China and were the cause of safety concerns in the U.S.

U.S. Congressman Brad Knott criticized VTA and Abboud for bringing counterfeit vaping products into the U.S. market from China. "The Chinese Communist Party has carried out an elaborate effort to skirt trade barriers and flood the U.S. market with dangerous counterfeit vape products," Knott said. He has said he refuses to meet with any members of the VTA.

In response, Abboud denied Knott's accusations against himself and the VTA. He called the remarks defamatory and "do not reflect our status as an association proudly fighting for the thousands of American companies that make up our industry."

== See also ==
- 6-Methylnicotine
- Center for Tobacco Products
- Electronic cigarette
- Family Smoking Prevention and Tobacco Control Act
- Flavored tobacco
- Health effects of electronic cigarettes
- List of vaping bans in the United States
- Premarket tobacco application
- Regulation of electronic cigarettes
- Tobacco harm reduction
- Trade association
- UK Vaping Industry Association
- Vape shop
