= Regulation of tobacco by the U.S. Food and Drug Administration =

FDA logo

Regulation of tobacco by the U.S. Food and Drug Administration began in 2009 with the passage of the Family Smoking Prevention and Tobacco Control Act by the United States Congress. With this statute, the Food and Drug Administration (FDA) was given the ability to regulate tobacco products.

== FDA regulation ==
Minimum age to purchase tobacco in the United States in 1989: Minimum age to purchase tobacco products. Sale from the age 19 Sale from the age 18 Sale from the age 17 Sale from the age 16 No minimum age

Prior to 1996, the FDA played no role in the regulation of tobacco products, and regulations were controlled through a combination of state and congressional regulation. Most state laws dealt with the sale of tobacco products, including the issue of selling to minors and licensing of distributors. By 1950, most states had laws prohibiting the sale of tobacco products to minors, which at the time, the purchase age differed in each state. Federal legislation enacted the “Tobacco 21” in December 2019 to increase the minimum legal sales age for tobacco products in the United States. In 2020 the federal government required states to set a minimum age of at least 21 years to purchase tobacco products, which was amended in all states by 2020.

In 1964, Surgeon General Luther Terry issued a report on smoking and health saying that tobacco causes lung cancer and is a main contributor to bronchitis. Members of the Federal Trade Commission read the report the day it was released and quickly proposed a mandatory cigarette label that warned, "CAUTION: cigarette smoking is dangerous to your health and may cause death from cancer and other diseases." However, legislation ultimately passed by Congress required a warning label with less dire language: "CAUTION: CIGARETTE SMOKING MAY BE HAZARDOUS TO YOUR HEALTH." In 1965, the United States Congress passed the Federal Cigarette Labeling and Advertising Act (FCLAA), which required a health warning on all cigarette packs. Congress also provided the Federal Trade Commission (FTC) authority under the FCLAA in relation to cigarette advertising. In 1970, President Richard Nixon signed the Public Health Cigarette Smoking Act, which banned cigarettes ads on the radio or television. It also required an updated warning on the cigarette packages which read: "Warning: The Surgeon General has determined that cigarette smoking is dangerous to your health."

In 1996, the FDA issued the "FDA Rule," which asserted its authority over tobacco products and issued a rule intending to prevent and reduce tobacco use by children. The intended regulations included prohibiting non-face-to-face sales of tobacco products, prohibiting outdoor advertising of tobacco products near schools or playgrounds, imposing more stringent advertising regulations, and prohibiting brand-name sponsorship, among other things.

After the regulations were issued in 1996, tobacco companies sued. In the 2000 Supreme Court case FDA v. Brown & Williamson Tobacco Corp., the court ruled that Congress had not given the FDA authority over tobacco and tobacco marketing.

As a result, Congress was forced to provide explicit FDA authority to regulate tobacco and this was finally accomplished via the passage of the Family Smoking Prevention and Tobacco Control Act in 2009.

== Family Smoking Prevention and Tobacco Control Act ==
The Family Smoking Prevention and Tobacco Control Act (also known as the FSPTC Act) was signed into law by President Barack Obama on June 22, 2009. This bill changed the scope of tobacco policy in the United States by giving the FDA the ability to regulate tobacco products, similar to how it has regulated food and pharmaceuticals since the passing of the Pure Food and Drug Act in 1906.

President Barack Obama, who has himself struggled with smoking addiction, praised the law, saying that it will save American lives. The Obama administration had previously voiced support for such an act, while former President George W. Bush had threatened to veto the law after it had passed the United States House of Representatives in 2008. Much opposition to the law from Congress came from tobacco-growing states such as North Carolina, whose representatives said they felt that the FDA was not fit to take on the large task of regulating tobacco products.

The act gives the FDA comprehensive control on tobacco products for sale in the United States. Much of the legislation is targeted specifically at cigarettes and/or smokeless tobacco products. The act gives the FDA the power to:

- Require tobacco companies to submit an ingredients list of any product sold or imported in the United States
- Require tobacco companies to make public the nicotine content of their products and to adopt standards of nicotine content and to reduce or eliminate other harmful substances present
- Enlarge warnings on tobacco packaging so that they take up 50% of the front and back panel area
- Regulate the use of terms such as "mild" and "light" by requiring that tobacco products conform to certain standards regarding these terms
- Create a Tobacco Products Scientific Advisory Committee to help inform the FDA on issues relating to tobacco products

== Center for Tobacco Products ==
The Center for Tobacco Products (CTP) is the branch of the FDA created in response to and for the implementation of the Family Smoking Prevention and Tobacco Control Act. The FDA currently has eight divisions, each of which is responsible for protecting some aspect of the public health. The main duties of the Center for Tobacco control include:

- Set performance standards
- Review applications for new tobacco products (see premarket tobacco application) and modified-risk claims (see modified risk tobacco products) before they reach the market
- Require and control warning labels
- Establish and enforce advertising restrictions

The Center for Tobacco Products is the newest branch of the FDA, and officially was opened on August 19, 2009. Lawrence Deyton, M.D., M.S.P.H, was appointed the first director of the center. Mitch Zeller, JD, became the Director of CTP in March 2013. Zeller was the associate commissioner and director of FDA's first Office of Tobacco Programs until 2000, when the Supreme Court decided that Congress did not give the FDA authority over tobacco products and tobacco product marketing.

In 2016, FDA issued the "deeming rule," which extended its tobacco product authorities to add product categories such as e-cigarettes, cigars, hookah tobacco, and pipe tobacco that meet the statutory definition of "tobacco product”. Effective as of 14 April 2022, congress clarified that FDA’s tobacco product authority covers products containing nicotine from any source, including synthetic nicotine.

In April 2025, the U.S. Supreme Court unanimously upheld FDA’s denial of marketing authorization for certain flavored e-liquid vaping products submitted by Triton Distribution and Vapetasia, reversing a Fifth Circuit ruling that had faulted FDA’s process.

In June the same year, the U.S. Supreme Court held that retailers who would sell a new tobacco product absent an FDA denial order may seek judicial review of that denial under the Tobacco Control Act, expanding who may challenge marketing denial orders in court.

The FDA issued marketing granted orders authorizing the sale of tobacco- and menthol-flavored JUUL device and JUULpod products in July 2025, while stating it would monitor the company’s compliance with marketing restrictions intended to limit youth exposure.

=== Flavored tobacco ===
A ban on flavored tobacco, as mandated by the Family Smoking Prevention and Tobacco Control Act, was implemented by the CTP on September 22, 2009. This law bans the sale or distribution of any cigarettes containing an artificial or natural flavor other than tobacco. This ban does not apply to menthol.

In April 2022, FDA proposed product standards to prohibit menthol as a characterizing flavor in cigarettes and to ban characterizing flavors in cigars.

=== Tobacco Products Scientific Advisory Committee ===
The Family Smoking Prevention and Tobacco Control Act called for the creation of a Tobacco Products Scientific Advisory Committee (TPSAC), and the inaugural meeting for this committee was held on March 30–31, 2010. The main purpose of the committee is to assess health and safety issues concerning tobacco products, and then provide advice, information, or recommendations to the Commissioner of Food and Drugs based on their findings. Some specific reports they are responsible for include:

- Impact of menthol in cigarettes on public health
- Impact of dissolvable tobacco on public health
- Effect of changing nicotine yields in tobacco products, and whether there is a certain level below which nicotine does not produce dependence
- Any application for a modified risk tobacco product

The committee has 12 members, one of which is the chair of the committee. The members are chosen by the Commissioner and are individuals with expertise in the field of medicine, science or technology involving tobacco products. There are 9 voting members, all of whom work in the health care profession in specialties relevant to tobacco use (such as pulmonology, cardiology, toxicology, etc.). One member will be either a federal or local government employee, and one will be a representative of the general public. The three non-voting members will include representatives of various parts of the tobacco industry: one representative of the growers, one of the manufacturing industry, and one of the small-business tobacco manufacturing industry. All members will serve four-year terms.

== Tobacco industry response ==
=== Suing the FDA ===
Five tobacco companies, including Lorillard Tobacco Company, L.P., and R. J. Reynolds Tobacco Company, filed a civil lawsuit in federal court against the United States and the FDA in response of the legislation. The suit was filed in Bowling Green, Kentucky, home to Commonwealth Brands, another tobacco company named in the suit.

The plaintiffs' (the tobacco companies) objections to the Family Smoking Prevention and Tobacco Control Act and policies decided upon by the Center for Tobacco Control included:

- A full ban on the use of colors and graphics on cigarette and smokeless tobacco packaging
- A ban on the ability for a tobacco company to sponsor an event or piece of merchandise with their brand name
- The FDA’s authorization of "further restrictions", allowing federal, state, local, and Indian governments to enact legislation more strict than the Family Smoking Prevention and Tobacco Control Act
- A mandated size increase of tobacco warnings on packaging, including "color graphics depicting the negative health consequences of smoking to accompany the label statements"
- The FDA’s ability to regulate relative risk claims made on Modified Risk Tobacco Products (MRTP’s)
- Requiring that products may not advertise the fact that they are regulated by the FDA
- A ban on all forms of outdoor advertising
- A ban on the ability to include samples and gifts with the sale of tobacco products

Notably, the tobacco companies argued that the increased size of warning labels on cigarette packing and new restrictions on the design of the packaging interfere with their First Amendment rights to communicate with adult consumers. In addition, they argued against the ban on publicizing relative risk claims about their products, which would apply to light cigarettes and various forms of smokeless tobacco on First Amendment grounds.

Judge Joseph H. McKinley, Jr. issued his Opinion of the Court on January 4, 2010. In reviewing the arguments of the plaintiffs and defendants, McKinley, Jr. ruled largely, but not completely, in favor of the United States and the FDA. Judge McKinley, Jr. ruled that a full ban of graphics and colors on all advertisements and packaging does infringe on the First Amendment rights of tobacco companies to communicate with their adult consumers without reasonably limiting the products’ appeal to youths. However, Judge McKinley, Jr. sided with the defendants on all other contested issues. He ruled that requiring enlarged warnings on packaging is reasonable because it serves to better alert the public about adverse health effects of smoking. He also found that giving the FDA the ability to regulate the use of the relative risk claims did not infringe on the First Amendment rights of the plaintiffs.

In November 2024, the U.S. Supreme Court declined to review a First Amendment challenge to FDA’s graphic cigarette warning label requirement brought by R.J. Reynolds. In January 2025, a federal judge in Texas blocked FDA from enforcing its final rule requiring new graphic warning labels on cigarette packages and advertisements while litigation proceeded. A federal judge vacated FDA’s 2024 final rule on graphic cigarette warnings in a case brought by Philip Morris USA and convenience-store groups, and the federal government appealed in August 2025.

=== Support from Philip Morris ===
American tobacco giants did not universally oppose FDA regulation upon the passing of the Family Smoking Prevention and Tobacco Control Act. Altria Group, the parent company of Philip Morris USA, has spoken out in support of the legislation. According to its website, Philip Morris has favored "tough but reasonable federal regulation of tobacco products by the Food and Drug Administration." The company also says that the legislation can be beneficial to adult consumers, and that they want "to work with the FDA as it implements a comprehensive national regulatory framework."

Philip Morris has not always supported such broad tobacco regulation. In 1996, they joined other tobacco companies in the major lawsuit that eventually led to FDA v. Brown & Williamson Tobacco Corp. being argued before the Supreme Court. However, since 2000, the company has supported "meaningful tobacco regulation." Philip Morris, the maker of Marlboro brand cigarettes and over a dozen other brands, has much to gain in this legislation. By further reducing tobacco companies’ ability to advertise, Philip Morris’ current US market share of 50% is in effect solidified as other companies are less able to convince consumers to switch to their products. The only downside for Philip Morris is that all companies will be taxed in proportion to their market share.

== See also ==
- Regulation of food and dietary supplements by the U.S. Food and Drug Administration
- Tobacco-free pharmacy
- David Aaron Kessler
