= Premarket tobacco application =

FDA application for marketing tobacco products

A premarket tobacco application (PMTA) is an application that must be reviewed and approved by the Food and Drug Administration before a new tobacco product can be legally marketed in the United States. To legally market a new tobacco product in the United States, a company must receive a written marketing order from FDA. Following a review of a PMTA under section 910 of the Federal Food, Drug, and Cosmetic Act a marketing order may be issued. The first PMTA was approved by US FDA on November 10, 2015, when the FDA authorized the marketing of eight Swedish Match North America Inc. snus smokeless tobacco products (to be marketed under the brand name "General").

In October 2021, FDA issued a final rule setting forth requirements for PMTAs and requiring tobacco product manufacturers to maintain records establishing that their tobacco products are legally marketed. The rule became effective November 4, 2021.

The final rule states it 'requires manufacturers to maintain records establishing that their tobacco products are legally marketed' and 'creates postmarket reporting requirements' for applicants that receive marketing granted orders.

== New tobacco product ==
A new tobacco product is either a product commercially marketed in the United States after February 15, 2007, or any modification to a tobacco product commercially marketed after February 15, 2007. If a predicate product existed prior to February 15, 2007, applicants can apply via the Substantial Equivalence (SE) regulatory pathway.

An FDA guidance for industry on PMTAs for ENDS was published in the Federal Register on October 5, 2021 (86 FR 55300) and became effective November 4, 2021.

== FDA deeming regulation ==
On May 10, 2016, the US FDA finalized its "deeming" rule, subjecting additional products to scrutiny under the Federal Food, Drug and Cosmetic Act as amended by the Family Smoking Prevention and Tobacco Control Act. The rule gives the US FDA authority to regulate e-cigarettes, cigars, and vape pens. The rule also authorizes FDA to take enforcement action against manufacturers who sell and distribute products with unsubstantiated modified risk tobacco product (MRTP) claims. The FDA deeming-rule became effective on 8 August 2016.

== Compliance periods ==
FDA is establishing staggered initial compliance periods based on the expected complexity of the applications to be submitted, followed by continued 12-month compliance periods of FDA review. Substantial Equivalence exemptions have a total compliance period of 24 months and an enforcement deadline of August 8, 2017. Substantial Equivalence applications have a total compliance period of 30 months and an enforcement deadline of February 8, 2018. Premarket tobacco applications have a total compliance period of 36 months and an enforcement deadline of August 8, 2018.

In August 2017, FDA announced availability of guidance extending certain compliance deadlines related to the final deeming rule. After the 2016 FDA ‘deeming’ rule placed additional products, like e-cigarettes (ENDS), under FDA tobacco authorities, a federal court order required PMTA’s for many deemed products already on the market to be submitted by 9 September 2020.

A 2023 Health and Human Services Office of Inspector General audit reported that by the 9 September 2020 deadline, FDA’s Center for Tobacco Products received PMTAs for more than 6 million ENDS products and recommended improvements to the ENDS PMTA review process.

| Product Pathway | Initial Compliance Period | Continued Compliance Period | Total Compliance Period | FDA Enforcement Deadline |
|---|---|---|---|---|
| Substantial Equivalence Exemption Request | 12 months | 12 months | 24 months | August 8 2017 |
| Substantial Equivalence Application | 18 months | 12 months | 30 months | February 8, 2018 |
| Premarket Tobacco Application | 24 months | 12 months | 36 months | August 8, 2018 |

In 2025, the U.S. Supreme Court decided in the FDA v. Wages and White Lion Investments case that the FDA had lawfully denied authorization to market certain flavored ENDS products.

== See also ==
- Regulation of tobacco by the U.S. Food and Drug Administration
