= Ventilated cigarette =

Cigarette that delivers a lower concentration of chemicals than regular cigarettes

Ventilated cigarettes (labeled in certain jurisdictions as light or mild cigarettes) are considered to have a milder flavor than regular cigarettes. These cigarette brands may be listed as having lower levels of tar ("low-tar"), nicotine, or other chemicals as "inhaled" by a "smoking machine". However, the scientific evidence is that switching from regular to light or low-tar cigarettes does not reduce the health risks of smoking or lower the smoker's exposure to the nicotine, tar and carcinogens present in cigarette smoke.

The filter design, which may include perforated holes, is one of the main differences between light and regular cigarettes. When attached to a smoking machine, the small holes in the sides of the filter dilute the tobacco smoke with clean air. In ultra-light cigarettes, the filter's perforations are even larger and on the smoking machine, they produce an even smaller smoke-to-air ratio. However, smokers react to the reduced resistance by inhaling more deeply and tend to cover the holes with their fingers and mouth. None of these ventilation techniques reduce harm to smokers, and some may increase it; they are designed to give better readings in a smoking-machine test while minimally reducing what human smokers inhale.

Belief among the general public that "light" cigarettes are less harmful and less addictive is pervasive and problematic to public health efforts. Usage of descriptors such as "light" or "mild" has thus been banned in the European Union, Australia, Malaysia, the Philippines, and the United States. Tobacco manufacturers now use color-coding to allow consumers to differentiate between regular and light brands, using lighter colors and silver for "light" cigarettes. Plain tobacco packaging does not appear to be helpful in reducing marketing influence.

== History ==
=== Cigarette filter ===
The 1950s gave birth to numerous scientific studies that proved the link between cigarettes and cancer (see Wynder and Graham, 1950; Doll and Hill, 1952, 1954; Hammond and Horn, 1958). In response to these studies and their perceived threat to the tobacco industry's future profitability, tobacco companies experimented with new modifications to the cigarette design. By altering the cigarette design, tobacco companies hoped to create a "safer" cigarette that would better appeal to their increasingly health-conscious consumers. Cigarette filters were introduced in the early 1950s. It was one of the industry's first design modifications, and filters would become essential to the later development of light and low-tar products. Claiming that filtered cigarettes literally "filtered out" much of the harmful tar and carcinogenic particles found in regular cigarettes, tobacco companies promoted "relative product safety" in order to convince smokers to continue smoking. Because filtered cigarettes were depicted as relatively safer and less harmful, smokers who were concerned about tobacco's negative health impacts were led to believe that by switching to filtered cigarettes, they would minimize smoking's detrimental impact on their health. As a result, millions of smokers switched to filtered cigarettes instead of quitting altogether. By 1960, filtered cigarettes had become the leading tobacco product.

=== Creation of the "light" cigarette ===
In addition to promoting the filtered cigarette as the answer to smokers' health concerns, the tobacco industry also poured resources into developing a cigarette that would produce lower machine-measured tar and nicotine yields when tested by the Federal Trade Commission (FTC). This endeavor resulted in the introduction and heavy promotion of "light" cigarettes during the 1970s. The newly designed light cigarette employed a special filter perforated with small holes; these perforated filters allegedly offset the concentration of inhaled harmful smoke with clean air. Most important to the tobacco industry, however, was that light cigarettes produced lower tar and nicotine levels when tested with the FTC's smoking machines.

== Market share ==
By 1997, the advertising of light cigarettes constituted fifty percent of the tobacco industry's advertising spending. Through heavy marketing, the tobacco industry succeeded in leading its consumer base to believe that light products were safer than regular brands, and thus, that these products were the rational choice for smokers who cared about their health. As a result of these implicit and widespread health claims, the popularity of light and low-tar cigarettes grew considerably. In fact, the market share of light cigarettes grew from 2.0 percent in 1967 to 83.5 percent of the tobacco market in 2005.

== Health claims ==
=== ISO machine-smoking method ===
Packages of light, mild, and low-tar cigarettes are often labeled as being "lower tar and nicotine" and also list tar and nicotine levels that are lower than those found on the packages of regular cigarettes. The lower tar and nicotine numbers found on cigarette packages represent the levels produced when machine "smoked" by a smoking machine test method. Developed by the FTC in 1967, the smoking machine test method was created to determine the yield of a cigarette by "smoking" it in a standardized fashion by machine; this test method is also known as the International Organization for Standardization (ISO) machine-smoking method. While the FTC has always recognized that the smoking machine cannot accurately replicate human smoking and that no two human smokers smoke in the same way, the FTC did not initially recognize the tobacco industry's ability to design cigarettes that yielded low levels of tar and nicotine when machine-smoked, but yielded much higher levels when smoked by a human being.

=== Cigarette modifications and "compensatory" smoking ===
Light cigarettes essentially fool smoking machines through several techniques. A light cigarette's filter perforated by tiny holes, for instance, is uncovered when smoked by machine, and consequently, the cigarette smoke is heavily diluted with air and causes the machines to report low levels of nicotine and tar. When smoked by human smokers, in contrast, this filter is usually covered by smokers' lips and fingers. Consequently, the filter holes are closed and the light cigarette actually becomes equivalent to a regular cigarette. Some tobacco manufacturers also increased the length of the paper wrap which covers the cigarette filter; this modification serves to decrease the number of "puffs" available to the machine test and limits the amount of tobacco that is machine "smoked". In reality, however, the tobacco found under this paper wrap which is not "smoked" by machine is still available to and smoked by the human smoker.

The human act of "compensating" is perhaps the most important area in which the ISO machine-smoking method yields misleading results. Unlike machines, human smokers are often heavily addicted to the nicotine in cigarettes, and consequently, smokers alter their smoking behaviors in order to consume the amount of nicotine required to satisfy their cravings. Compensatory behavior most often occurs when a smoker switches from regular cigarettes to light cigarettes. Numerous scientific studies reveal that the smoker compensates for the lower concentration of nicotine by actively changing his or her smoking habits. Smokers adjust their smoking techniques by smoking their cigarettes "more intensively". More intensive smoking is achieved by taking larger, more rapid, and more frequent puffs, by inhaling more deeply, by smoking more cigarettes per day, and/or by reflexively blocking the cigarette's filter. Due to these compensatory smoking behaviors, smokers of light cigarettes inhale significantly more nicotine and tar than what is measured by the ISO machine-smoking method.

=== Scientific conclusions ===
According to the 2004 Surgeon General's report, "Smoking cigarettes with lower machine-measured yields of tar and nicotine provides no clear benefit to health." The tobacco industry's own internal documents also reveal that cigarette manufacturers are aware of the difference between machine-measured levels of nicotine and tar, and those actually inhaled by smokers. The industry is also aware of the compensatory behaviors that smokers engage in when smoking light cigarettes.

=== Research into low-nicotine cigarettes and effects on smoking frequency ===
A recent small-scale study led by nicotine researcher Neal Benowitz found that smokers who were switched to cigarettes with tobacco that contained progressively less nicotine did not compensate by smoking more cigarettes, although a significant minority of the smokers in the research withdrew from the study citing a dislike of the taste of the reduced-nicotine cigarettes. These results differ greatly from those obtained in earlier studies by Benowitz and others, where filter-based nicotine reduction was found to result in compensatory smoking behaviours. According to a USCF article on the study, Benowitz wanted to simulate a societal scenario in which the nicotine content of cigarettes would be progressively regulated downward.

According to a 2013 Washington Post article, the US FDA has backed low-nicotine cigarette research as it weighs its new regulatory power. That new power includes the power to regulate the level of nicotine in cigarettes and was given to the FDA by the 2009 Tobacco Control Act.

== Legislation ==
=== United States ===
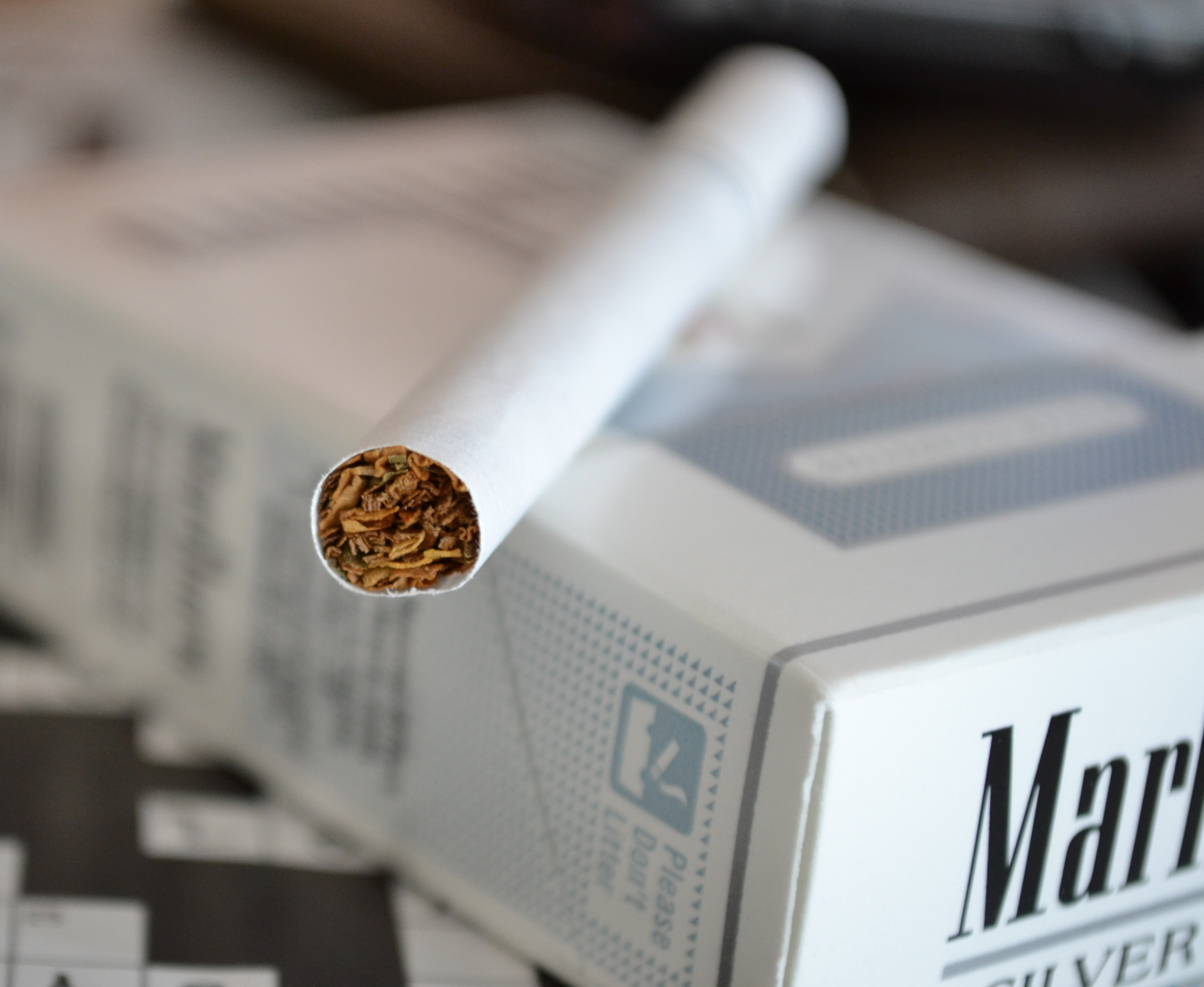
A cigarette and a pack of Marlboro Silver Pack (previously called Ultra Lights until the "light" name was banned as deceitful)

In June 2009, the United States Senate passed anti-smoking legislation described by USA Today as "the most sweeping tobacco-control measure ever passed by Congress". This legislation directly impacted the marketing and consumption of light tobacco products. In addition to giving the FDA regulatory power over all tobacco products, the bill severely restricted the tobacco industry's previous marketing strategies, many of which relied on making implicit health claims about their products. According to the bill, cigarette manufacturers are also forbidden from using product descriptors such as "light", "low-tar", and "mild".

Critics of the legislation question whether it will have a significant impact on today's pervasive tobacco market in the United States. For one, the bill does not specify acceptable words for differentiating light cigarettes from other cigarettes. Cigarette manufacturers quickly responded to this loophole by strategically color-coding their products so that Camel Lights, for example, is now Camel Blue. Nik Modi, a tobacco industry analyst, concedes that prohibiting terms like "light" and "low-tar" will hardly affect the tobacco market because smokers have already "become acclimated to color-coding."

=== European Union ===
The 2001 European Directive on Tobacco Products, which banned the use of terms such as "light", "mild" and "low-tar" with regards to tobacco products, was the first major piece of legislation from the European Commission regarding tobacco control. This came into effect on 30 September 2003 for members of the European Union. A study on the United Kingdom found that while legislation had a minor impact in challenging misleading perceptions of ventilated cigarettes among smokers in the short term, by 2005 the change in belief had changed no more than in the United States, which at the time did not have any regulation regarding "light" descriptors of ventilated cigarettes.

== Notes ==
- Benowitz, Neal L.; Peyton Jacob, III; Bernert, John T.; Wilson, Margaret; Wang, Langing; Dempsey, Delia (2005). "Carcinogen Exposure during Short-term Switching from Regular to "Light" Cigarettes". Cancer Epidemiol Biomarkers Prev. 14 (6): 1376–383. doi:10.1158/1055-9965.epi-04-0667. PMID 15941944.
- Benson, Peter. "Safe Cigarettes." Dialect Anthropol (2009). 28 Aug. 2009. Web. 6 Apr. 2010.
- "Cigarettes with Brand Descriptors - Philip Morris USA." Philip Morris USA. Web. 22 Apr. 2010. <http://www.philipmorrisusa.com/en/cms/Products/Cigarettes/Health_Issues/Cigarettes_with_Brand_Descriptors/default.aspx?src=search>.
- Gilpin, Elizabeth A.; Emery, Sherry; White, Martha M.; Pierce, John P. (2002). "Does Tobacco Industry Marketing of 'light' Cigarettes Give Smokers a Rationale for Postponing Quitting?". Nicotine & Tobacco Research. 4 (2): S147–155. doi:10.1080/1462220021000032870. PMID 12573176.
- Koch, Wendy. "Senate Passes the Most Sweeping Tobacco-control Bill." USA Today. USA Today, 11 June 2009. Web. 18 Apr. 2010. <https://www.usatoday.com/news/washington/2009-06-11-tobacco-control-bill_N.htm>.
- "Research Findings Concerning So-Called Low Tar or 'Light' Cigarettes" (2007) Statement of Cathy Backinger, Ph.D. Acting Chief, Tobacco Control Research Branch, National Cancer Institute, National Institutes of Health, U.S. Department of Health and Human Services <https://www.cancer.gov/about-nci/legislative/hearings/2007-testing-light-low-tar-tobacco-products.pdf>.
- Risks Associated with Smoking Cigarettes with Low Machine-measured Yields of Tar and Nicotine. Monograph 13 ed. [Bethesda, MD]: U.S. Dept. of Health and Human Services, Public Health Service, National Institutes of Health, National Cancer Institute, 2001. Smoking and Tobacco Control. Web. 22 Apr. 2010. <http://cancercontrol.cancer.gov/brp/tcrb/monographs/13/ >.
- U.S. National Institutes of Health. NCI Fact Sheet: The Truth About "Light" Cigarettes: Questions and Answers. Rep. no. 10.17. National Cancer Institute, 17 Aug. 2004. Web. 18 Apr. 2010. <http://www.cancer.gov/cancertopics/factsheet/Tobacco/light-cigarettes>.
- Wilson, Duff (11 June 2009). "Senate Approves Tight Regulation Over Cigarettes". The New York Times.
