= Flavored tobacco =

Tobacco product with added flavorings

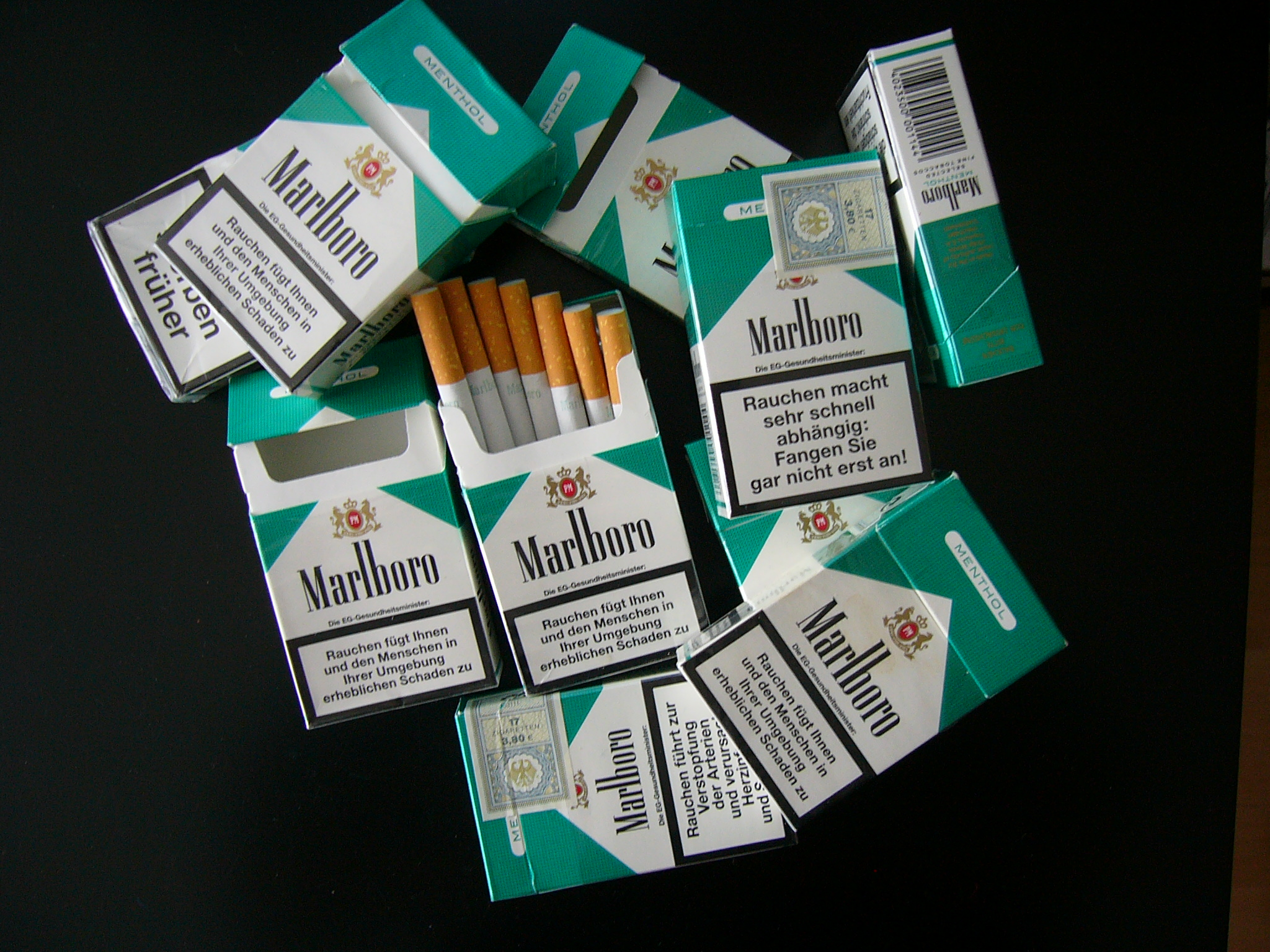
Menthol cigarettes are a variety of flavored tobacco product.

Flavored tobacco products—tobacco products with added flavorings—include types of cigarettes, cigarillos and cigars, hookahs and hookah tobacco, various types of smokeless tobacco, and more recently electronic cigarettes. Flavored tobacco products are especially popular with youth and have therefore become targets of regulation in several countries.

According to a 2013 survey of internet tobacco retailers, the most common flavors are apple, cherry, chocolate, honey, grape, menthol, mint, peach, rum, strawberry, "sweet" (including bubble gum, candy, mango, blueberry, strawberry, orange, gum mint, and toffee) and vanilla.

== Flavored cigarettes ==
Cigarettes may be flavored to mask the taste or odor of the tobacco smoke, enhance the tobacco flavor, or decrease the social stigma associated with smoking. Flavors are generally added to the tobacco or rolling paper, although some cigarette brands have unconventional flavor delivery mechanisms such as inserting flavored pellets or rods into the cigarette filter. Cigarette flavors include anise, clove, cinnamon, spearmint, wintergreen, citrus, fruit, and alcoholic drinks (especially rum and cocktails). Flavors may be added to the tobacco, cigarette paper, filter, or even to the foil wrapper. Some tobacco companies have developed unconventional flavor delivery systems, including polymer pellet technology, using a flavored filter pellet (polyethylene bead), flavor micro-encapsulation in the paper or packaging technology, flavor fibers inserted into the filter, and flavored tips. Flavorings are typically added at the end of the cigarette manufacturing process. Flavored cigarettes are heavily preferred by youth, with research in 2004–2005 finding that United States adolescents and young adults used major brands of flavored cigarettes at 2 to 3 times the rate of adults aged 25 and older.

=== Beedi ===
One common type of flavored cigarettes are beedis, a small, thin, hand-rolled cigarette originally from India, where they outsell regular cigarettes by a ratio of eight to one. Another is kretek, a cigarette made with a blend of tobacco and cloves that is popular in Indonesia. No flavored cigarettes, including menthol, beedis, and kreteks, are safe. Indeed, many flavorings produce increased levels of acetaldehyde when combusted, enhancing dependence and toxicity. Additionally, some flavorings in cigarettes contain toxic compounds such as alkenylbenzenes.

=== Menthol cigarettes ===
The most popular cigarette flavor by far is menthol, which represents 10% of the global cigarette market and over 25% of the market in countries including the United States, Singapore, the Philippines, and Chile. Menthol is a chemical found in plants of the mint family that produces a cooling sensation in the throat. It is often used as a cigarette additive to mask the flavor and feel of the tobacco smoke or to improve the throat and mouth feel of the cigarette. Menthol increases the addictive properties of the nicotine in cigarettes, in part by increasing the density of nicotine receptors in the brain.

In the United States, menthol cigarettes are used disproportionately by African Americans: more than 70% of African-American smokers primarily use menthols, compared to approximately 30% of White American smokers. In fact, menthol tobacco marketing is specifically targeted to African Americans; it is a subject of research and it has been a subject of litigation on discrimination grounds. This high use by African Americans is largely the result of deliberate marketing campaigns by tobacco companies, which exacerbated small racial differences in menthol cigarette preferences into large ones. Racial marketing strategies changed during the Fifties. The civil rights movement led to the rise of African-American publications, such as Ebony. This helped tobacco companies to target separate marketing messages by race. Tobacco companies supported civil rights organizations, and advertised their support heavily. Industry motives were, according to their public statements, to support civil rights causes; according to an independent review of internal tobacco industry documents, they were "to increase African American tobacco use, to use African Americans as a frontline force to defend industry policy positions, and to defuse tobacco control efforts". There had been internal resistance to tobacco sponsorship, and some organizations are now rejecting nicotine funding as a matter of policy. Tobacco company Lorillard even gave out free menthol cigarette samples to children in black neighborhoods in the U.S. in the 1950s.

In addition to high use by African Americans, menthol cigarettes are used disproportionately by adolescents, women, and lesbian, gay, bisexual, and transgender (LGBT) Americans. LGBT Americans are twice as likely as straight ones to use menthol cigarettes, according to CDC research. Where these demographics overlap, menthol use is especially high: most female LGBT smokers use menthols, as do 80 percent of African American youth smokers and 70 percent of LGBT youth smokers. Tobacco companies have targeted the LGBT community with advertising for menthol cigarettes, most notably through Project SCUM.

== Cigars ==
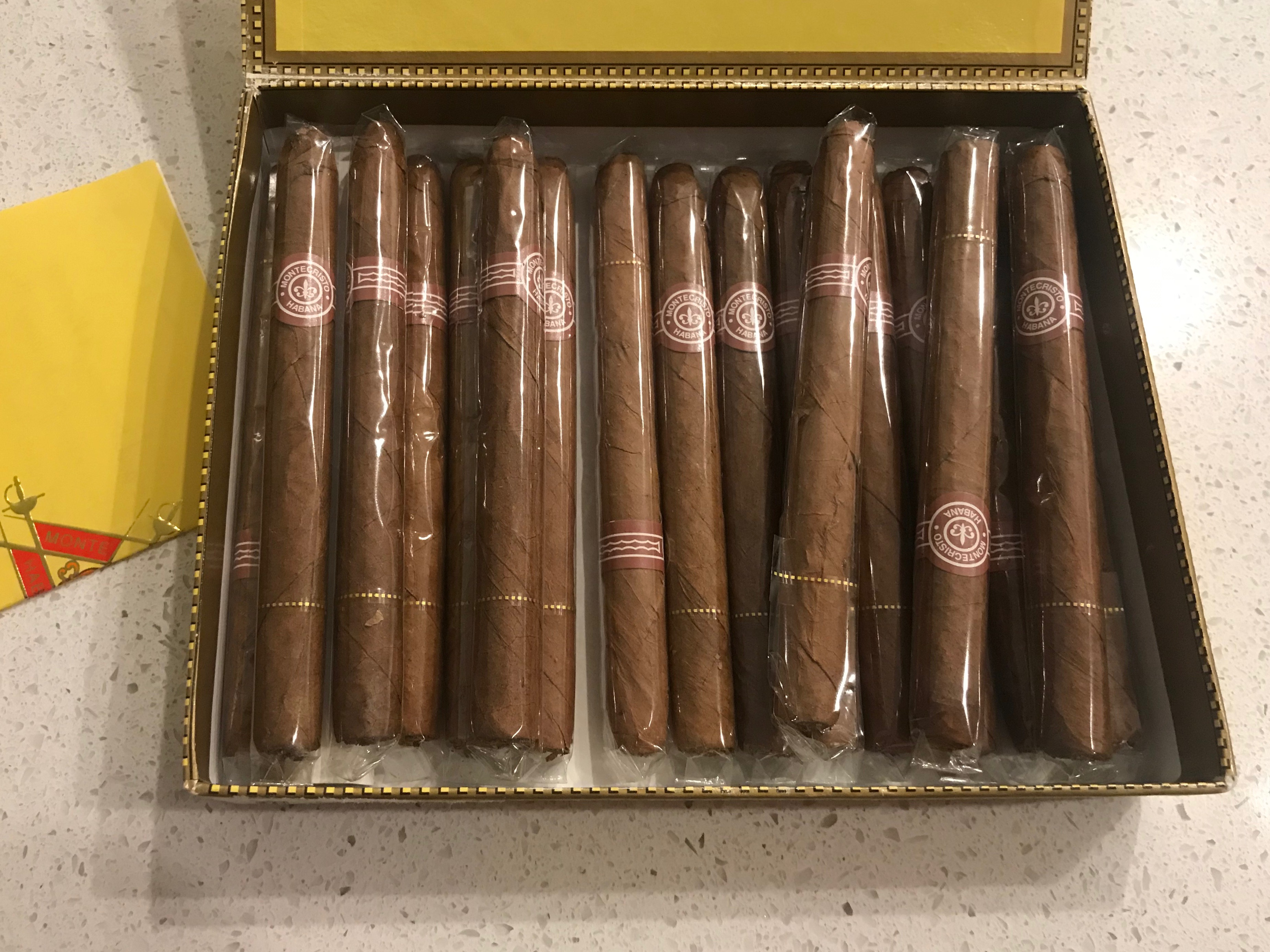
Montecristo, a brand of Cuban cigars

Little cigars, both cigarette-sized ones as well as mid-sized cigarillos, are typically flavored, unlike full-size, hand-wrapped premium cigars. Studies describe little cigars and cigarillos as cigarette-like products whose flavorings and packaging can make them more appealing and palatable, particularly to young adults. Small cigars and cigarillos are disproportionately used by lower income and less educated people, young people, African Americans, Hispanics, LGBT people, and men. Usage of flavored cigarillos has grown explosively, with sales in U.S. convenience stores up 50% between 2008 and 2015, after tripling between 1997 and 2007. Among adult and youth cigar users, about 40 percent use flavored cigarillos. The most popular flavors for cigarillos are fruit (38.8 percent), sweet or candy (21.2 percent), and wine (17.0 percent). Flavored cigarillos are popular with lower income and younger people in part because they are inexpensive and are promoted by tobacco companies as affordable alternatives to cigarettes. Unlike cigarettes, cigarillos can be sold in small packs of one or two each for around 99¢ for two. In many jurisdictions, cigarillos and other cigars are taxed at lower rates than cigarettes, making them more appealing to low-income populations, including youth, young adults, and the unemployed.

== Electronic cigarettes ==
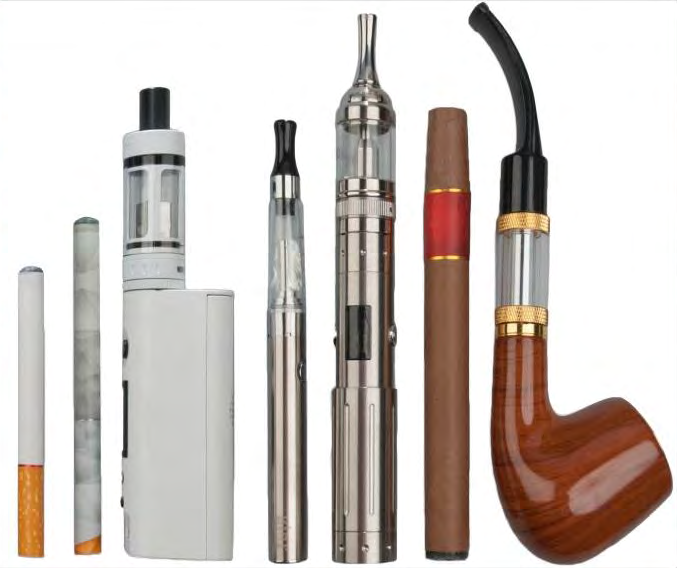
Different types of electronic cigarettes

E-liquid, the nicotine-containing liquid used in electronic cigarettes, is usually flavored. E-liquids come in a myriad of flavors, including mint, spice, fruit, and candy ones. A 2017 survey of internet e-cigarette retailers found 15,586 unique flavors of e-liquid and counting, up from the 7,764 found in a 2014 analysis. In surveys of regular e-cigarette users, the most popular e-liquid flavors are largely tobacco, mint and fruit, although candy and dessert flavors are also common. Mango is the most popular JUUL flavor. Fruit flavored e-liquid is the most commonly marketed e-liquid flavor on social media. Flavored e-liquids form a major part of the appeal for using e-cigarettes, especially for youth, for whom flavoring is cited as a major reason for using e-cigarettes.

Some e-liquid flavorings are toxic. Systematic reviews concluded that non-tobacco e-cigarette flavours may increase appeal and harms, while evidence on their effects on smoking initiation and cessation remains inconclusive. Cinnamaldehyde is a highly cytotoxic material in vitro used in cinnamon-flavored e-liquids. Cinnamaldehyde have been identified as cytotoxic at the amount of about 400 times less than those allowed for use by the US Environmental Protection Agency. A 2018 in vitro study found that exposing lung cells to liquid or vapor containing cinnamaldehyde causes significant and rapid damage to their cilia and mitochondria. This led the authors of the study to conclude that "inhalational exposures of cinnamaldehyde may increase the risk of respiratory infections in e-cigarette users." Some e-liquids containing cinnamaldehyde stimulate TRPA1, which might induce effects on the lung. E-liquids contain possibly toxic aldehydes and reactive oxygen species (ROS). Many flavors are known aldehydes, such as anisaldehyde, cinnamaldehyde, and isovaleraldehyde. A 2012 study found butterscotch flavor was highly toxic with one liquid and two others had a low toxicity. A 2014 in vitro study demonstrated that e-cigarette use of a "balsamic" flavor with no nicotine can activate the release of proinflammatory cytokine in lung epithelial cells and keratinocytes. Some additives may be added to reduce the irritation on the pharynx. The long-term toxicity is subject to the additives and contaminants in the e-liquid.

Certain e-liquid flavorings contain diacetyl and acetyl propionyl which give a buttery taste. Diacetyl and acetyl propionyl are associated with bronchiolitis obliterans ("popcorn lung"), a serious lung disease. A 2015 review recommended for specific regulation of diacetyl and acetyl propionyl in e-liquid, which are safe when ingested but have been associated with respiratory harm when inhaled. Both diacetyl and acetyl-propionyl have been found in concentrations above those recommended by the US National Institute for Occupational Safety and Health. Diacetyl is normally found at lower levels in e-cigarettes than in traditional cigarettes. Concerns exist that the flavors and additives in e-cigarettes might lead to diseases, including the popcorn lung. The cardiovascular effects, including a vast range of flavorings and fragrances, is unknown. The irritants butyl acetate, diethyl carbonate, benzoic acid, quinoline, bis(2-ethylhexyl) phthalate, and 2,6-dimethyl phenol were present as undeclared ingredients in the e-liquid. Hindering safety assessments of e-liquids is the fact that the precise ingredients of e-cigarettes and e-liquids are not known.

On 21 June 2024, the FDA authorized four menthol-flavored NJOY e-cigarette products for marketing in the United States; Reuters described it to be the agency's first authorization of flavored (non-tobacco) e-cigarette products.

July 2025, the FDA also authorized the marketing of JUUL device and tobacco- and menthol-flavored JUULpods in both 3% and 5% nicotine strengths. That same year, the FDA authorised four Glas e-liquid pod products, including two that were non-tobacco and non-menthol products, marking the agency’s first authorization of ENDS products in that flavor category. The authorization came with device-access and marketing restrictions intended to limit youth use.

With the current popular trend of flavored e-cigarettes use among young generations, there is concern about the potential long-term health of the public.

== Heated tobacco products ==
Heated tobacco products are frequently flavored. It is possible that these products could appeal to non-smokers, especially since they are available in various flavors.

== Nicotine pouches ==
Nicotine pouches are oral nicotine products that may be flavored but do not contain tobacco leaf.

On 16 January 2025, the FDA authorised several ZYN nicotine pouch products, including flavoured varieties, through the Premarket Tobacco Product Application (PMTA) pathway. The products for which marketing grants were issued by the FDA are as follows, each with two nicotine strengths (3 mg and 6 mg):

- ZYN Chill
- ZYN Cinnamo
- ZYN Citrus
- ZYN Coffee
- ZYN Cool Mint
- ZYN Menthol
- ZYN Peppermint, ZYN Smooth, ZYN Spearmint and ZYN Wintergreen.

== Hookah ==
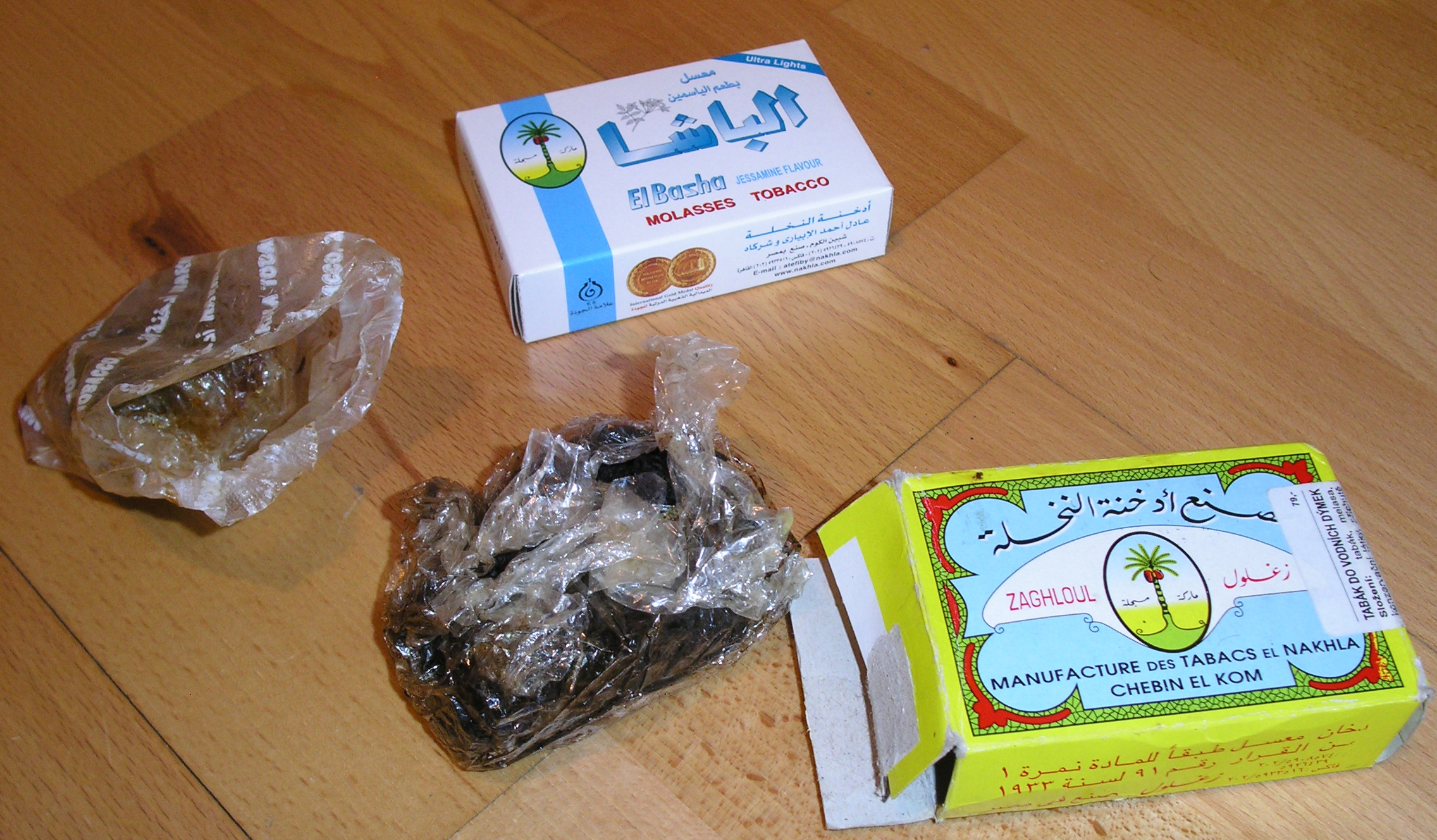
Various packages of hookah tobacco (muʽassel or shisha)

Muʽassel (also known as shisha), the tobacco product used in hookahs, is almost always flavored: more than 85% of mu'assel sold in the United States is flavored. Typical flavors include apple, plum, coconut, mango, mint, strawberry and cola, with mint and double apple (Arabic: تفاحتين) being the most popular. Unusual flavors, including white gummy bear, blueberry muffin, spiced chai and Powerbull flavor (similar to the flavor of a Red Bull energy drink), have been introduced in recent years by modern tobacco companies. Heating these flavorings releases toxic chemicals and carcinogens such as carbon monoxide (CO), polycyclic aromatic hydrocarbons (PAHs), furans, phenols, aldehydes (such as acrolein), and acids, in addition to nitrogenous carcinogens, alcohols, and heavy metals, all of which are dangerous to human health. A comparison of 13 common hookah flavors found that melon flavors are the most dangerous, with their smoke containing four classes of hazards in high concentrations.

== Smokeless tobacco ==
Many types of smokeless tobacco are flavored. Nasal snuff is typically flavored, with common flavors including coffee, chocolate, bordeaux, honey, vanilla, cherry, orange, apricot, plum, camphor, cinnamon, rose, spearmint, Bourbon, Cola, and whisky. Gutka, a chewing tobacco preparation commonly used in parts of India, is commonly flavored, as is naswar, a type of dipping tobacco common in Central and South Asia. Moist snuff (dip), snus, and dissolvables are also often flavored. Accounting for more than half of moist snuff and more than four-fifths of snus sold, flavored smokeless tobacco has been becoming very popular and driving the growth in smokeless tobacco usage in the United States.

== Use by youth ==
Flavored tobacco products—particularly flavored cigarettes (including menthol), cigarillos, hookah, and electronic cigarettes—are disproportionately preferred by adolescents and young adults. Because of the high availability of these popular flavors, flavored tobacco products are widely used for at least 80% of youth tobacco users. According to the CDC, 67% of high school students and 49% of middle school students who used tobacco products in the past 30 days reported using a flavored tobacco product during that time.

Flavored tobacco products promote youth smoking initiation and help young occasional smokers to become daily smokers by reducing or masking the natural harshness and taste of tobacco smoke and increasing the social acceptability of the toxic tobacco product. The Longitudinal PATH Study found that the first use of flavored tobacco products was associated with an increased risk of subsequent tobacco use among youth, young adults, and adults. Menthol appeals to younger or beginning smokers largely because the menthol masks the harshness and discomfort of inhaling smoke, making smoking more palatable. Trying menthols increases smoking initiation among youth and young adults, and menthols users face greater addiction and decreased success in quitting smoking. Young people who use menthol cigarettes are 80% more likely to become life-long smokers than those who use regular cigarettes. Likewise, studies associate youth hookah use with subsequent cigarette use, increased intensity of cigarette use, and decreased success in quitting. Flavored e-cigarettes have been marketed using flavors, packaging and promotional features that research has found particularly appealing to adolescents. Systematic reviews have linked non-tobacco flavors to greater product appeal, increased interest in trying e-cigarettes, and initiation among youth. A 2016 study also supported this finding: English children aged 11 to 16 who were exposed to e-cigarette advertisements that highlighted flavored, in contrast to flavor-free e-cigarettes, reported increased e-cigarette appeal and usage of e-cigarettes. As such, adolescents were more likely to initiate vaping through flavored e-cigarettes than unflavored ones, and a majority of youth who used an e-cigarette first tried a flavored e-cigarette. In the United States, youth e-cigarette use peaked in 2019 and has generally declined since then. Despite this decline, e-cigarettes remain the most commonly used tobacco product among youth.

The goal of tobacco companies also drives the widespread use of flavored tobacco products. According to a 2008 study, the internal tobacco company documents found that makers of the largest menthol cigarette brands in the United States—Kool, Newport, Salem, Marlboro, and Camel—formulated the menthol levels in their cigarettes, as well as their marketing strategies, to entice young people. Likewise, multiple reviews of internal tobacco company documents have found that flavored cigarettes are deliberately introduced to appeal to young people, with flavorings often being fine-tuned to best appeal to youth.

Furthermore, flavored tobacco products are often advertised to children and adolescents. Flavored cigarettes have been advertised in magazines frequently read by kids, such as Sports Illustrated, Cosmopolitan, and Rolling Stone and on television programs watched by adolescents. A majority of adolescents and young adults are exposed to cigarillo advertising in magazines and storefronts and on social media. Flavored e-cigarettes have been marketed extensively to youth in retail stores and on television and social media: 78.2 percent of American youth (20.5 million people). A 2018 analysis of the 2014, 2015, and 2016 NYTS data by the CDC found that retail stores were where most youth were exposed to e-cigarette advertisements, followed by online advertising, television advertising, and then newspaper and magazine advertising. About 24 million youth have been exposed to e-cigarette ads on cable TV, primarily due to an ad campaign for blu e-cigarettes. On social media, marketing includes images associated with youth culture, endorsements by celebrities and social media influencers popular with youth, and themes that have been found to strongly appeal to youth (such as freedom and rebellion). Ads for flavored e-cigarettes have been shown to cause children to be more interested in buying and trying e-cigarettes, as compared to ads for unflavored e-cigarettes.

== Regulation ==
Although a few countries have banned flavored cigarettes (except menthol), flavors in most tobacco products remain unregulated across the globe. In 2025, the World Health Organization (WHO) called on governments to ban all flavors in tobacco and nicotine products, including cigarettes, nicotine pouches, hookah products, and e-cigarettes. The WHO also identified flavor accessories as a regulatory concern and reported that 50 countries currently ban flavored tobacco and 40 countries ban the sale of e-cigarettes, but there is a large gap in the regulation of flavored nicotine products around the world.

In March 2012, Brazil became the first country to outlaw all flavored cigarettes, including menthol cigarettes. The policy has yet to be implemented.

In 2015, Ethiopia, Moldova, and Chile have passed legislation banning flavored tobacco products. Turkey also implemented the world's first ban on menthol in all tobacco products in that year.

=== Australia ===
Australia's 2024 vaping reforms limited the sale of vapes to pharmacies for smoking cessation or nicotine dependence management if they met the Therapeutic Goods Administration's (TGA) regulatory requirements. Therapeutic vaping products were restricted to specific flavors, such as tobacco, mint, and menthol.

=== Canada ===
Canada banned flavored additives in combustible tobacco products—cigarettes, little cigars, and rolling papers—in 2009, excluding menthol. Canada banned menthol cigarettes in 2017. Preliminary research in Ontario Province indicates that this ban increased the number of smokers who quit. Furthermore, a pooled pre-post evaluation of Canada’s menthol cigarette bans also found higher quit success among menthol smokers than among non-menthol smokers after the bans. A systematic review and meta-analysis of menthol cigarette bans revealed that these policies were linked to the following outcomes: 24% of menthol smokers quit, 50% switched to non-menthol cigarettes, and 24% continued to obtain menthol cigarettes. Because the law only banned flavors in combustible tobacco products under 1.4 grams, some tobacco companies began producing flavored products slightly larger than 1.4 g.

=== European Union ===
In May 2016, the European Union banned flavored cigarettes including menthols. The ban took effect in 2020. The European Union later withdrew certain exemptions for heated tobacco products, thereby extending restrictions on flavors and flavor-modifying components, such as filters, papers, packages, and capsules, to that product category.

=== United States ===
The Family Smoking Prevention and Tobacco Control Act, passed by the United States Congress in October 2009, bans cigarettes with flavors other than menthol or tobacco. However, some tobacco companies have rebranded their flavored cigarettes as "little" or "filtered" cigars in order to circumvent this ban. In December 2016, the U.S. Food and Drug Administration (FDA) sent warning letters to four tobacco companies—Swisher International, Inc., Cheyenne International LLC, Prime Time International Co. and Southern Cross Tobacco Company Inc.—for marketing their fruit-flavored cigarettes as cigars to avoid the ban. A 2016 analysis of data from the 1999–2013 National Youth Tobacco Surveys suggests that the ban reduced adolescent cigarette use—both probability of smoking a cigarette and number of cigarettes used by smokers—although there was an increase in adolescent use of menthols, smokeless tobacco, flavored cigars, and pipes, suggesting substitution towards the remaining legal flavored tobacco products. That said, the ban was associated with a reduction in overall tobacco product use by youth of 6 percent.

In June 2018, San Francisco residents voted to outlaw the sale of flavored tobacco products, including e-liquids and menthol cigarettes, in the city. The measure, Proposition E, passed with 69% of the vote, in spite of Big Tobacco company R.J. Reynolds spending more than $12 million on ads against the measure. The ban was supported by groups including the American Cancer Society, the American Heart Association, the American Lung Association, African American American Tobacco Control Leadership Council, and Tobacco-Free Kids Action Fund. Similar bans have passed in California in the cities of Oakland and Sonoma as well as in San Mateo, Contra Costa and Yolo counties. As of January 2019, 180 localities in California, Illinois, Massachusetts, Minnesota, New York, and Rhode Island as well as two US states—Maine and New Jersey—restrict the sale of flavored tobacco products. Massachusetts implemented a statewide restriction on sales of flavored tobacco products, including menthol cigarettes, effective June 1, 2020. A later evaluation found no statistically significant reduction in adult cigarette use in Massachusetts compared to Connecticut one year after the restriction was implemented. California’s statewide flavored-tobacco sales law was later strengthened to include an unflavored tobacco list, restrictions for online and delivery sellers, and enforcement provisions for products marketed with cooling sensations or nicotine analogs.

In June 2019, San Francisco became the first major U.S. city to put a ban on the sale and distribution of all e-cigarettes including flavored ones. The major e-cigarette company in San Francisco, JUUL spent over $18.6 million to the Proposition C campaign into a November ballot initiative in hopes to overturn the ban. This Proposition C would take launch starting early 2020 depending on the ballot results from San Francisco residents. It is based on the election results on November 5, 2019, the Proposition C was defeated. It shows that 82% of people were against Prop C. Which means that the citywide ban on e-cigarette products will be effective in 2020.

In September 2019, Michigan became the first state in the nation to ban flavored e-cigarettes.

In November 2018, the FDA announced its intention to outlaw menthol cigarettes and flavored cigars, and to limit sales of e-cigarettes with flavors other than mint, tobacco, and menthol to qualified adults-only stores and online.

In April 2022, the FDA proposed product standards to prohibit menthol as a characterizing flavor in cigarettes and to prohibit characterizing flavors in cigars; after the proposals were delayed in 2024, the FDA withdrew both proposed rules in January 2025.

In 2024, the Department of Justice and FDA announced a multi-agency task force to address unauthorized e-cigarette products, part of federal enforcement activity against products marketed without authorization.

In April 2025, the US Supreme Court unanimously largely upheld the FDA's denials of applications to market sweet/fruit-flavored e-cigarette liquids, while sending the case back for further review of a specific issue regarding the companies' marketing plans.

=== New Zealand ===
New Zealand restricts the colors and flavor descriptions of vaping products, prohibits colorings in notifiable products, limits general retailers to approved flavors, and restricts descriptors associated with cooling effects, such as "ice," that fall outside of the permitted naming rules. Retailers may only sell tobacco, menthol, or mint flavors.

== See also ==
- Menthol cigarette
- Nicotine marketing
- Tobacco marketing targeting African Americans
- Tobacco politics
