= Little Lungs in a Great Big World =

American public service announcement series

Logo from the "Birthday" advertisement.

Little Lungs in a Great Big World is a stop-motion animated tragicomedy educational public service announcement series that is part of a campaign for the FDA Center for Tobacco Products by FCB named "The Real Cost." The advertisements, released on March 15, 2017, were directed by British animator Peter Sluszka and produced by New York City studio Hornet. The commercials follow a set of anthropomorphic young lungs named Little Lungs, who "smoked as a teen and never grew to normal size." Little Lungs tries to enjoy leisure activities with his friends but always ends up facing horrific consequences in his attempts to do so. FCB's approach towards animated entertainment for PSAs was a deviation from most anti-smoking advertisements that they felt were "overplayed warnings" most teenagers ignored.

== List of advertisements ==
Title	Summary
"Snowboard"	Little Lungs snowboards with his friends on a snowy mountain, but he can't get enough air to control where's he going which leads him to impale on a moose's horns.
"Birthday"	During his birthday party, Little Lungs blows very hard to blow out the candles. However, he doesn't have enough air to do so and blows so hard to the point of landing facefirst on the candles, being set on fire, and being blown out of the window by a fire extinguisher.
"P.E."	During gym class, Little Lungs climbs a rope but gets to a point where he doesn't have enough air to climb further and ultimately falls down, severely burning on the fabric of the rope to the point where he splits apart.
"Pool"	Little Lungs gets tragically eaten by a shark for not being able to swim fast enough out of a pool.
"Bike"	Little Lungs rides his bike with his friends, but the slope of a road he is riding on is too much for his amount of breathe to handle. This leads him to roll down so fast that he falls off his bike to the front lawn of a house where is he is shredded by a lawnmower.
"Grindin' with Tony Hawk"	Little Lungs skateboards with Tony Hawk, but riding up the half-pipe and down the grind-rail is too much for his lungs to handle, so he falls off his skateboard onto the grind-rail whereas the friction causes him to start to burn. He eventually slides off of the grind-rail where we see a mutilate version of little lungs, with one of his eyes out of the socket. His skateboard runs into his eyeball and drags it offscreen where it snaps back into the socket like a rubberband.

== Concept and analysis ==
The scenarios Little Lungs goes through in the advertisements reflect those of the leisure activities teenagers commonly do. As David Gianatasio of Adweek wrote, "Teens want to enjoy fun activities and be accepted by their peers. The notion that smoking might ruin their leisure time or social lives could make some think twice before lighting up." In the words of FCB chief creative officer Ari Halper, Little Lungs was meant to be a "character people could fall in love with and root for, even if doing so proved to be a lost cause." He said that the PSAs intended to move away from "overplayed warnings" most teenagers ignored in favor of "disarmingly entertaining animated shorts.” The advertisements have a distasteful comedy style similar to shows such as Robot Chicken and South Park that are heavily watched by the teenage demographic the PSAs are aimed at. Branding compared the character Little Lungs to Kenny McCormick in that he dies at the end of all the commercials, and the publication also labeled its style in the same league as Happy Tree Friends. Journalist Olivia Atkins found it similar to the Australian campaign Dumb Ways to Die.

== History ==
The Six commercials of Little Lungs in a Great Big World were animated by two people at the same time at different sets in daily twelve-hour sessions. All of the ads took three weeks to animate altogether. Museum wax was used to create the blood for Little Lungs. The series was released on YouTube, Facebook, Snapchat, and Instagram on March 15, 2017. Creativity covered the advertisements as part of their "Editor's Pick" column, while Shoot magazine reported on it as the "Top Spot of the Week." B&T and Animation Magazine also covered the ads. In its first week of being uploaded, the commercials garnered more than ten million views. On March 29, 2017, it was announced the series was to compete at the 2017 Annecy International Animated Film Festival.
