= Neal Benowitz =

American academic physician

Neal L. Benowitz is an American academic physician and professor of medicine at the University of California, San Francisco (UCSF), with expertise on the pharmacology of nicotine and tobacco addiction.

== Education ==
Benowitz studied physics at Rensselaer Polytechnic Institute from 1962 to 1965. He received his M.D. from the University of Rochester in 1969, after which he worked as an intern and resident at Bronx Municipal Hospital Center for two years as a resident and intern. He then spent the next year working as a fellow in clinical pharmacology at the University of California, San Francisco.

== Career ==
Benowitz joined the faculty of UCSF in 1973 as a clinical instructor. He was appointed an assistant professor there the following year, and became an associate professor in 1981. Since 1987, he has been a professor of medicine, psychiatry, and biopharmaceutical sciences at UCSF. Since 1983, he has also been the chief of UCSF's Clinical Pharmacology and Experimental Therapeutics division.

Benowitz received the 1995 Ferno Clinical Research Award from the Society for Research on Nicotine and Tobacco (SRNT).In 1996, he was honored with the Alton Ochsner Award Relating Smoking and Disease. The American Society of Clinical Pharmacology & Therapeutics bestowed the Rawls-Palmer Progress in Medicine Award on Benowitz in 1999, and the Oscar B. Hunter Memorial Award in Therapeutics in 2006.

From 1996-97, Benowitz served as elected President of the Society for Research on Nicotine and Tobacco. He served as President of the American Society of Clinical Pharmacology & Therapeutics (ASCPT) from 1996-97.

== Research ==
Benowitz is known for studying the pharmacology of nicotine, and he has been called "one of the country's preeminent experts on nicotine." In 1988, he served as a senior scientific editor of the Surgeon General's report on nicotine addiction. In 2009, he co-wrote a report from the Institute of Medicine on the cardiovascular effects of passive smoking.

== FDA Committee membership ==
In 2010, Benowitz was named a member of the Tobacco Products Scientific Advisory Committee, an advisory panel of the Food and Drug Administration. At the time, some were concerned that he might have a conflict of interest due to the fact that he had served as a consultant to GlaxoSmithKline and Pfizer, who make smoking cessation products, but Benowitz dismissed these accusations, saying that he didn't see a "direct conflict of interest" because the panel does not oversee smoking cessation products. In 2011, tobacco companies Lorillard and RJ Reynolds sued the Food and Drug Administration, claiming that Benowitz, along with Jack Henningfield and Jonathan Samet, had conflicts of interest that disqualified them from being members of the committee. Specifically, the tobacco companies claimed that Benowitz, Henningfield and Samet had conflicts of interest because all three of them had received thousands of dollars to testify against tobacco companies and had served as advisors to companies that make smoking cessation products. In July 2014, Judge Richard J. Leon ruled in favor of the companies, finding that Benowitz, Henningfield and Samet all were ineligible to serve on the panel due to their conflicts of interest, and ordering the FDA to reorganize the panel.
