= Menthol cigarette =

Cigarette flavored with the compound menthol

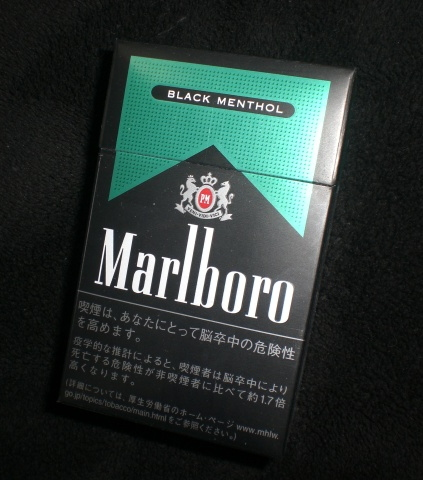
Marlboro Black Menthol (Japan)

A menthol cigarette is a cigarette infused with the compound menthol which imparts a “minty” flavor to the smoke. Menthol also decreases irritant sensations from nicotine by desensitizing receptors, making smoking feel less harsh compared to regular cigarettes. The American Lung Association has suggested that they are more addictive. Menthol cigarettes are just as hard to quit and are just as harmful as regular cigarettes.

Menthol cigarettes have been banned in several countries, including Australia, Canada, Ethiopia, all member states of the European Union, Moldova, Turkey, the United Kingdom, and some areas of the United States, including California, the District of Columbia, and Massachusetts.

== Origins and history ==
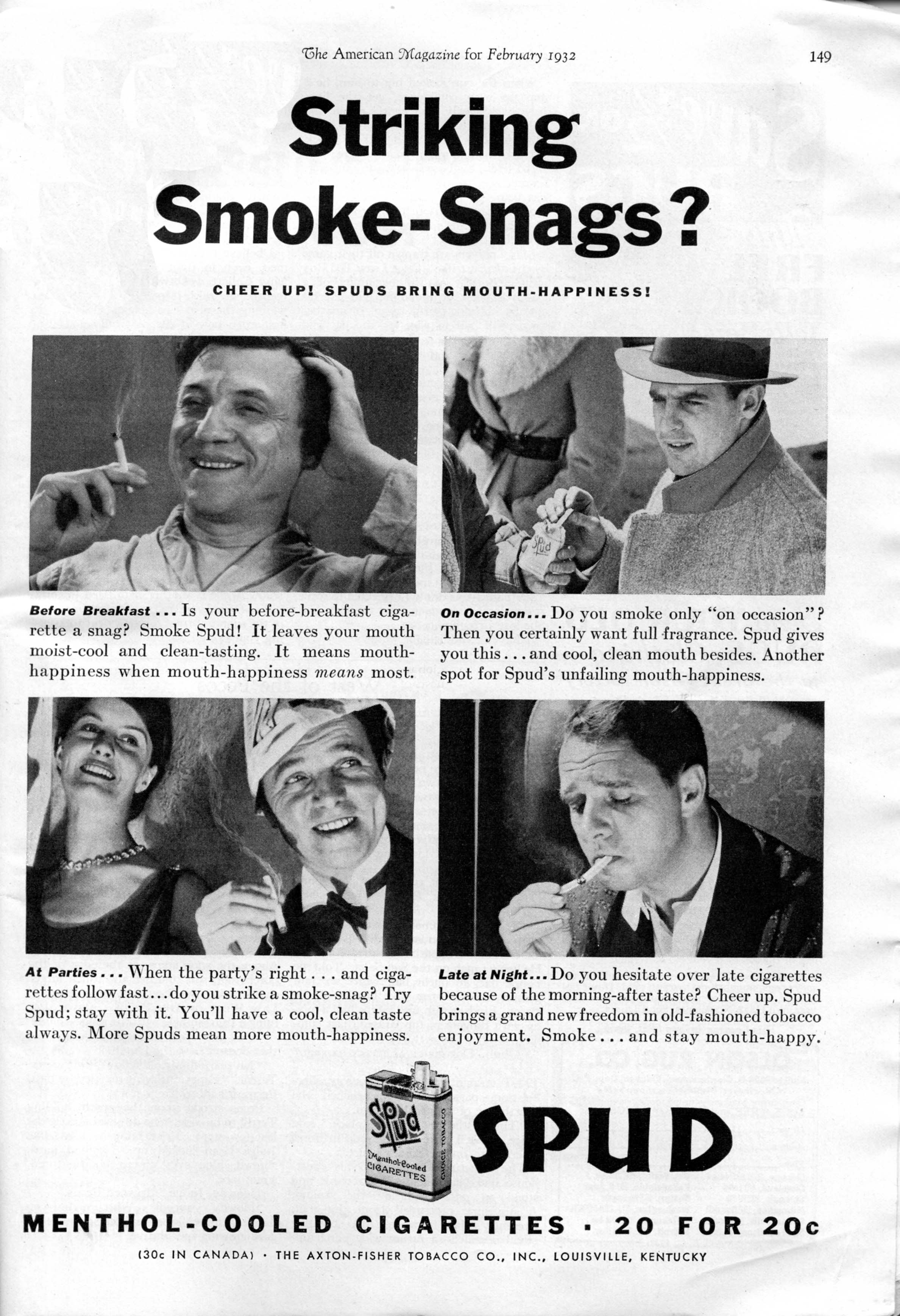
Spud cigarettes advertisement in The American Magazine (February, 1932)

Menthol cigarettes were first developed by Lloyd "Spud" Hughes of Mingo Junction, Ohio, in 1924, though the idea did not become popular until the Axton-Fisher Tobacco Co. acquired the patent in 1927, marketing them nationwide as "Spud Menthol Cooled Cigarettes". Spud brand menthol cigarettes became the fifth most popular brand in the US by 1932, and it remained the only menthol cigarette on the market until the Brown & Williamson Tobacco Company created the Kool brand in 1933.

For over two decades, Kool was the only significant menthol cigarette brand in the United States, with a market share that never got much above 2%. Their advertisements focused on "throat comfort" and the "medicinal" properties of menthol, and some ads even suggested occasional use: "In between the others, rest your throat with Kools".

R. J. Reynolds Tobacco Company launched the first menthol filter-tip cigarettes in 1956 under the Salem brand. Less mentholated than Kool, Salem was positioned as an all-purpose cigarette, and captured 0.8% market share within its first year. Other tobacco producers, seeing the success of Salem, soon introduced their own mentholated filter cigarettes: Lorillard with Newport in 1957 and Spring in 1959; Philip Morris with Alpine cigarettes in 1959; and Brown & Williamson with Belair in 1960.

== Design and manufacture ==
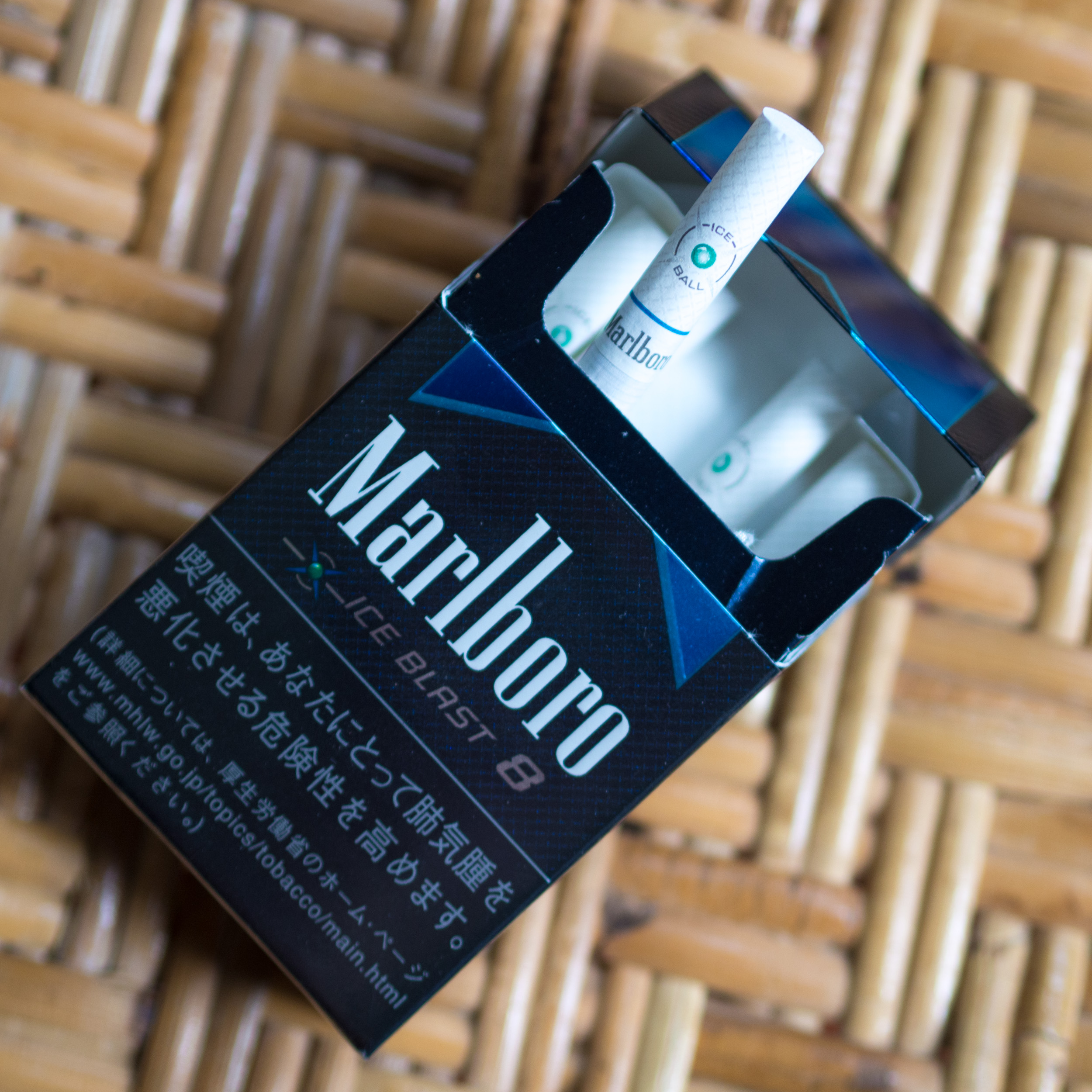
Marlboro Ice Blast, in addition to being a normal mentholated cigarette, also contains a menthol capsule inside the filter that can be broken by the smoker at the desired moment.

Menthol cigarettes are constructed similarly to non-mentholated cigarettes, with menthol added at any of several stages during the manufacturing process. Menthol may be derived from distilled corn mint oil, or produced synthetically. While trace amounts of menthol may be added to non-mentholated cigarettes for flavor or other reasons, a menthol cigarette typically has at least 0.3% menthol content by weight. Lower-tar menthol cigarettes may have menthol levels up to 2%, in order to keep menthol delivery constant despite the filtration and ventilation designs used to reduce tar.

A recent innovation has been to include a small capsule in or near the filter which can be broken to release additional menthol or other flavoring solutions. During the smoking of a cigarette the menthol delivery depletes noticeably, but this technology allows the smoker to increase the menthol delivery at a chosen point to sustain or enhance the menthol 'feel'. The capsules can contain any flavorings, but are primarily menthol.

Compared to tobacco blends for non-mentholated cigarettes, a menthol cigarette will tend to have more flue-cured than burley tobacco, and less oriental tobacco.

== Use and popularity ==
Menthol cigarette usage varies widely by country. They are most popular in the Philippines, where they account for over 60% of total cigarette sales.

=== United States ===
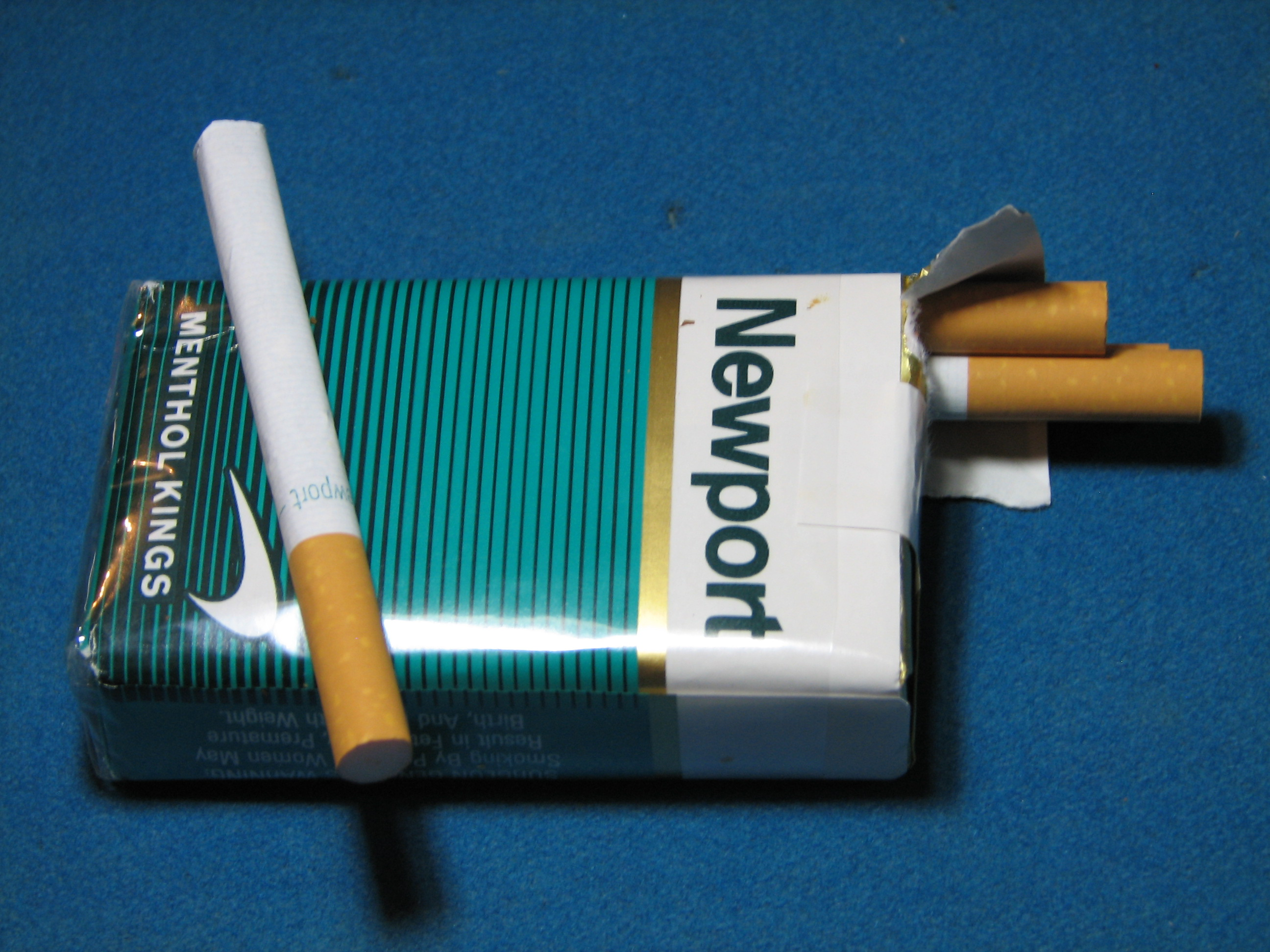
A soft pack of Newport Menthol cigarettes

Historian Keith Wailoo argues the cigarette industry targeted a new market in the black audience starting in the 1960s. It took advantage of several converging trends. First was the increased national attention on the dangers of lung cancer. Cigarette companies responded by developing menthol-flavored brands like Kool, which seemed to be more soothing to the throat, and advertised these as being more healthy. A second trend was the Federal ban on tobacco advertising on radio and television; as there was no ban on advertising in the print media, the industry responded with large scale advertising in Black newspapers, magazines as well as billboards in inner city neighborhoods. The third trend was the Civil rights movement of the 1960s. Big Tobacco invested heavily in the Civil Rights Movement, winning the gratitude of many national and local leaders. Menthol flavored cigarette brands sponsored local events in the black community, and subsidized major black organizations including the NAACP (National Association for the Advancement of Colored People) in addition to many churches and schools. The marketing initiative was a success as the rate of smoking in the black community grew, especially for menthols, while it declined among whites.

In the United States, menthols comprise about 30% of the total cigarette market. Menthol cigarettes are purchased disproportionately by African-American smokers, with 80% of African-American smokers consuming menthol cigarettes primarily. In fact, menthol tobacco marketing is specifically targeted to African Americans; it is a subject of research and it has been a subject of litigation on discrimination grounds. The proportion of smokers who use menthols rose from 31% in 2004 to 33.7% in 2010, according to a 2010 study by the Substance Abuse and Mental Health Services Administration. Much of the increase comes from young people.

Racial marketing strategies changed among American tobacco companies during the 1950s. The civil rights movement led to the rise of African-American publications, such as Ebony. This helped tobacco companies to target separate marketing messages by race. Tobacco companies supported civil rights organizations, and advertised their support heavily. Industry motives were, according to their public statements, to support civil rights causes; according to an independent review of internal tobacco industry documents, they were "to increase African American tobacco use, to use African Americans as a frontline force to defend industry policy positions, and to defuse tobacco control efforts". There had been internal resistance to tobacco sponsorship, and some organizations later began rejecting nicotine funding as a matter of policy.

Race-specific advertising exacerbated small (a few percent) racial differences in menthol cigarette preferences into large (tens of percent) ones. It has been proposed that menthol cigarettes, which are more addictive but no less harmful, should be banned, partially on grounds that race-specific marketing for a more addictive product is a social injustice. Despite it being illegal at the time, tobacco marketers gave out free menthol cigarette samples to children in black neighborhoods in the U.S. Similar practices continue in Sub-Saharan Africa, where a 2016 study found over 12% of South African students had been given free cigarettes by tobacco company representatives.

In addition to high use by African Americans, menthol cigarettes are used disproportionately by adolescents, women, and lesbian, gay, bisexual, and transgender (LGBT) Americans. Americans identifying as LGBT are twice as likely to use menthol cigarettes, according to CDC research. Where these demographics overlap, menthol use is especially high: most female LGBT smokers use menthols, as do 80% of African American youth smokers and 70% of LGBT youth smokers. Tobacco companies have targeted the LGBT community with advertising for menthol cigarettes, most notably through Project SCUM.

A Federal Trade Commission report released September 21, 2012, said menthol cigarettes sales had gone from 27% in 2008 to 22% in 2010.

== Regulation ==
Several places have banned menthol cigarettes, including Canada, Ethiopia, Turkey, Moldova, the European Union and the United Kingdom.

=== Canada ===
Canada imposed a nationwide ban on menthol cigarettes that took effect on 1 October 2017, though several provinces had already banned it at the provincial level: Quebec, Alberta, Nova Scotia, Ontario and New Brunswick.

=== Brazil ===
In March 2012, Brazil became the first country to pass a law banning flavored cigarettes including menthol cigarettes, but has been unable to enact it due to the tobacco industry interference resulting in a lengthy court battle. Philip Morris Brasil (PMB) had challenged the ban through its membership of The National Industry Confederation, arguing that the ban was unconstitutional. According to Philip Morris International's 2018 annual report, "The tobacco union requested a stay of the enforcement of the ingredient ban while the appeal is pending." The Brazilian government won the court case in February 2018, though as of 2025, this ban still remains to be implemented.

=== Europe ===
In July 2015, Moldova became the world's first country to enact a ban on menthol cigarettes. The law was signed by the president alongside numerous other anti-smoking laws to reduce the domestic use of smoking (tobacco use was over 50 percent of males and caused over 5,600 deaths per year). The United States Chamber of Commerce lobbied against the legislation which delayed the bill until it was passed and signed by president Nicolae Timofti.

On 21 June 2013, EU health ministers agreed on a directive to ban menthol cigarettes (technically "dual flavour cigarettes"). In response, the former German chancellor Helmut Schmidt (1918–2015) was reported to have hoarded 200 cartons of his preferred menthol cigarette brand in his house.

On 20 May 2020, menthol cigarettes were banned in all European Union countries. Despite having left the EU in January 2020, the United Kingdom also enacted the ban legislation. Studies have shown that the EU menthol cigarettes ban was effective in increasing quit attempts and quitting among pre-ban menthol smokers. In October 2014, Serbia drafted anti-smoking laws including the ban of menthol cigarettes. In Ukraine, menthol cigarettes are banned. In Switzerland, the parliament rejected a bill to ban menthol cigarettes. On 5 January 2022, menthol cigarettes were banned in Turkey. In 2023, the Norwegian government stated that menthol cigarettes are set to be banned in 2024. As of July 2024, the ban is not yet enacted and expected to come in 2025.

=== United States ===
==== Proposed ban in the United States ====
Although the use of menthol in ointments and cough drops is regulated by the Food and Drug Administration (FDA) in the United States of America, regulation of cigarettes was ruled to be outside their existing purview in 2000 by the Supreme Court in the 5–4 decision FDA v. Brown & Williamson Tobacco Corp. This power was explicitly granted to the FDA by the 2009 Family Smoking Prevention and Tobacco Control Act, which also outright banned flavors in cigarettes other than menthol.

On March 18, 2011, the Tobacco Products Scientific Advisory Committee (an advisory panel to the FDA) concluded that removing menthol cigarettes from the market would benefit public health in the United States, but stopped short of recommending that the FDA take any specific actions, like restricting or banning the additive. In response, the tobacco industry released a report to the FDA in an effort to change the focus of the subject by claiming menthol cigarettes are no riskier than regular cigarettes and should not be regulated differently. A progress report on panel findings was expected from the FDA in July 2011. The doctors' group African American Tobacco Control Leadership Council continued to support the ban.

In November 2018 the FDA announced its intention to outlaw menthol cigarettes, later changing this position to advocate for restriction of flavored tobacco and e-cigarettes to a separate age-restricted room. The FDA stated that this change in position was due to their belief that they do not have the legal regulatory authority to unilaterally declare a ban, citing concerns that any such ban would result in litigation that the FDA would lose.

In June 2020, two US NGOs (African American Tobacco Control Leadership Council and Action on Smoking and Health) filed a lawsuit against the FDA to try to force it to introduce a ban on menthol cigarettes in order to reduce health inequalities, noting that 85% of African American smokers smoke menthol cigarettes.

In April 2021, the FDA announced that it planned to ban the sale, manufacturing, and importation of menthol cigarettes and mass-produced flavored cigars, citing menthol’s highly addictive qualities and the racial disparities among those most likely to smoke menthol cigarettes. Proposed regulations were published for public comment in April 2022. The attempt was postponed indefinitely after negative public feedback, with particular controversy generated on both sides by the disproportionate use by African-Americans.

The Congressional Black Caucus issued a letter in support of a menthol cigarettes ban and opposed its postponement by the Biden administration. The NAACP (National Association for the Advancement of Colored People) condemned the administration's postponement of the menthol cigarettes ban, stating "The NAACP is outraged and disgusted, but we refuse to be deterred. We will continue to do whatever it takes to protect and advance Black life. This is what standing for community looks like." The American Medical Association (AMA) also protested the postponement and joined a lawsuit intending to force the FDA to implement the ban.

In 2025, the Trump Administration withdrew the proposed ban.

==== Opposition to proposed ban ====
Several black advocacy groups have voiced opposition to a proposed ban on menthol in cigarettes. The Congress of Racial Equality, the National Black Chamber of Commerce, the National Organization of Black Law Enforcement Executives, National Action Network, and the National Black Police Association have urged the FDA to reject a ban on mentholated cigarettes due to concerns that banning mentholated cigarettes could spur an illicit market for the outlawed products in minority communities. Many of these organizations have received funding from major tobacco companies, raising conflict of interest concerns. Groups representing law enforcement officers also oppose the ban. The Law Enforcement Alliance of America and the National Troopers Coalition have urged the FDA to consider the impact a ban on menthol cigarettes would have on tobacco smuggling. The proposed menthol ban also saw opposition from organized labor. In December 2010, workers from the Bakery, Confectionery, Tobacco Workers and Grain Millers' International Union protested outside a meeting between FDA officials and industry representatives in Raleigh, North Carolina, arguing that a menthol ban would cost many workers their jobs. Additionally, the National Association of Convenience Stores opposes the ban based on menthol cigarettes accounting for 4% of their sales. In a November 2023 letter to Joe Biden, they claimed that their members made $23.7 billion in sales on menthol cigarettes and flavored cigars and another $10.7 billion in non-tobacco sales among these smoking customers during 2022. A 2020 US Surgeon General Report, Smoking Cessation, concluded that there is not enough evidence to support banning menthol as a way to reduce smoking.

== Health impact ==
Menthol cigarettes are not healthier than other cigarettes. The risk of lung cancer is no different for menthol cigarettes compared to regular cigarettes. Some studies have suggested that they are more addictive. Young people who use menthol cigarettes are also thought to be 80% more likely to become life-long smokers than those who use regular cigarettes. Menthol decreases irritant sensations from nicotine by desensitizing receptors, making smoking less harsh. Menthol cigarettes have been shown to inhibit nicotine metabolization, leading to increased systemic nicotine exposure and increased nicotine addiction.

== See also ==
- Flavored tobacco
- Nicotine marketing
- Tobacco marketing targeting African Americans
- Tobacco politics
