= Jonathan Samet =

American physician and epidemiologist

- Born: Jonathan Michael Samet; March 26, 1946 (age 80); Newport News, Virginia
- Education: Harvard University (BA); University of Rochester (MD); Harvard University (MS)
- Awards: Calderone Prize (2025)

Jonathan Michael Samet (born March 26, 1946 in Newport News, Virginia) is an American pulmonary physician and epidemiologist who served as dean of the Colorado School of Public Health after holding leadership positions at the University of New Mexico, Johns Hopkins University, and the University of Southern California. Samet has been the chair of the Clean Air Scientific Advisory Committee of the Environmental Protection Agency, as well as the Tobacco Products Scientific Advisory Committee of the Food and Drug Administration. He has served as the senior scientific editor for several surgeon general’s reports, including the 50th anniversary report in 2014. Samet is "viewed as an international authority on the effects of smoking and air pollution on health". His work has been recognized through awards such as the Luther L. Terry Distinguished Career award from the American Cancer Society and the Calderone Prize for public health.

== Education ==
Samet received his A.B. from Harvard College in 1966, and his M.D. from the University of Rochester School of Medicine in 1970. He was drafted by the U.S. Army, and worked as an anesthesiologist at Gorgas Hospital, a military hospital in the Panama Canal zone from 1971 to 1973, due to a shortage of doctors in that specialty. This sparked his interest in breathing and connections between environmental issues and health. He received his M.S. in epidemiology from the Harvard School of Public Health in 1977. Samet is certified by the American Board of Internal Medicine, both as a diplomate and in the Subspecialty of Pulmonary Medicine.

== Career ==
In 1978, Samet joined the faculty of the University of New Mexico as an assistant professor, where he became an associate professor in 1982. In 1986, he became the Professor of Family, Community, and Emergency Medicine at the University of New Mexico's School of Medicine, as well as the chief of its Pulmonary Division.

From 1994 until 2008, he was a professor at Johns Hopkins University's Bloomberg School of Public Health, as well as Chair of the Department of Epidemiology. He also served as the director of Johns Hopkins' Institute for Global Tobacco Control from 1998 to 2008.

In 2008, Samet joined the faculty of the University of Southern California, becoming the Flora L. Thornton Chair of the Department of Preventive Medicine and the founding director of the USC Institute for Global Health. He also chaired the Clean Air Scientific Advisory Committee of the Environmental Protection Agency and the Tobacco Products Scientific Advisory Committee of the Food and Drug Administration. Samet was appointed as a member of the U.S. National Cancer Advisory Board (NCAB) in 2011 by President Barack Obama. He also served as the chair of an International Agency for Research on Cancer working group in 2011, regarding whether mobile phone use was carcinogenic. He has served as president of the American College of Epidemiology and of the Society for Epidemiologic Research.

In 2017 Samet became dean of the Colorado School of Public Health. Samet was a Professor in the Departments of Epidemiology and Environmental and Occupational Health at the Colorado School of Public Health. He stepped down from the role of dean in 2023, while remaining a member of the faculty.

From 2020 to 2026, Samet served as an editor-in-chief of the journal Population Health Metrics.

== Research ==
Samet has engaged in epidemiologic research to examine possible threats to public health, using research findings to support the development of policies for the protection of population health. He has studied health risks from indoor and outdoor air pollution, including the effects of radon, particulate matter, and both active and passive smoking. A major focus of his work has been tobacco use and regulation.

Samet has served as the senior scientific editor for several surgeon general’s reports and is highly regarded "for his skill at managing potentially contentious committee gatherings and harnessing the discussion into a useful policy analysis." He is considered "an international authority on the effects of smoking and air pollution on health".

== Honors and awards ==
In 1997, Samet was inducted into the Institute of Medicine. Samet received the Surgeon General's Medallion in 1990 and 2006, the Prince Mahidol Award for Global Health awarded by the King of Thailand in 2004, and the Public Service Award of the American Thoracic Society in 2006. In 2013, he received the Edward Livingston Trudeau Medal for lifelong contributions from the American Thoracic Society. In 2015, he received the David Rall Medal from the National Academy of Medicine and the Luther L. Terry Award for Distinguished Career from the American Cancer Society. In 2016, he received the Fries Prize for Improving Health from the James F. and Sarah T. Fries Foundation in partnership with the CDC Foundation. In 2025, Samet was awarded the Calderone Prize, the most prestigious award in the field of public health.

== Selected works ==
=== Journal articles ===
- Samet, Jonathan M.; Burke, Thomas A. (2020). "Deregulation and the Assault on Science and the Environment". Annual Review of Public Health. 41. Annual Reviews: 347–361. doi:10.1146/annurev-publhealth-040119-094056. ISSN 1545-2093. PMID 31905321.
- Wipfli, Heather; Samet, Jonathan M. (2016). "One Hundred Years in the Making: The Global Tobacco Epidemic". Annual Review of Public Health. 37. Annual Reviews: 149–166. doi:10.1146/annurev-publhealth-032315-021850. ISSN 1545-2093. PMID 26772406.
- Glass, Thomas A.; Goodman, Steven N.; Hernán, Miguel A.; Samet, Jonathan M. (2013). "Causal Inference in Public Health". Annual Review of Public Health. 34. Annual Reviews: 61–75. doi:10.1146/annurev-publhealth-031811-124606. ISSN 1545-2093. PMC 4079266. PMID 23297653.
- Bell, Michelle L.; Ebisu, Keita; Peng, Roger D.; Samet, Jonathan M.; Dominici, Francesca (15 June 2009). "Hospital Admissions and Chemical Composition of Fine Particle Air Pollution". American Journal of Respiratory and Critical Care Medicine. 179 (12): 1115–1120. doi:10.1164/rccm.200808-1240OC. PMC 2695497. PMID 19299499.
- Dominici, Francesca; Peng, Roger D.; Bell, Michelle L.; Pham, Luu; McDermott, Aidan; Zeger, Scott L.; Samet, Jonathan M. (8 March 2006). "Fine Particulate Air Pollution and Hospital Admission for Cardiovascular and Respiratory Diseases". JAMA. 295 (10): 1127–1134. doi:10.1001/JAMA.295.10.1127. PMC 3543154. PMID 16522832.
- Bell, Michelle L.; Samet, Jonathan M.; Dominici, Francesca (2004). "Time-Series Studies of Particulate Matter". Annual Review of Public Health. 25. Annual Reviews: 247–280. doi:10.1146/annurev.publhealth.25.102802.124329. ISSN 1545-2093. PMID 15015920.
- Bell, Michelle L.; McDermott, Aidan; Zeger, Scott L.; Samet, Jonathan M.; Dominici, Francesca (17 November 2004). "Ozone and short-term mortality in 95 US urban communities, 1987-2000". JAMA. 292 (19): 2372–2378. doi:10.1001/jama.292.19.2372. PMC 3546819. PMID 15547165.
- Brook, Robert D.; Franklin, Barry; Cascio, Wayne; Hong, Yuling; Howard, George; Lipsett, Michael; Luepker, Russell; Mittleman, Murray; Samet, Jonathan; Smith, Sidney C.; Tager, Ira (June 2004). "Air Pollution and Cardiovascular Disease: A Statement for Healthcare Professionals From the Expert Panel on Population and Prevention Science of the American Heart Association". Circulation. 109 (21): 2655–2671. doi:10.1161/01.CIR.0000128587.30041.C8. PMID 15173049.
- Daniels, Michael J; Dominici, Francesca; Zeger, Scott L; Samet, Jonathan M (31 May 2004). "National Morbidity, Mortality, and Air Pollution Study. Part III: Concentration–Response Curves and Thresholds for the 20 Largest US Cities. Research Report 094-III, 2004". Health Effects Institute.
- Samet, Jonathan M.; Dominici, Francesca; Curriero, Frank C.; Coursac, Ivan; Zeger, Scott L. (14 December 2000). "Fine Particulate Air Pollution and Mortality in 20 U.S. Cities, 1987–1994". New England Journal of Medicine. 343 (24): 1742–1749. doi:10.1056/NEJM200012143432401. PMID 11114312.
- Samet, Jonathan M.; Zeger, Scott L.; Dominici, Francesca; Curriero, Frank; Coursac, Ivan; Dockery, Douglas W.; Schwartz, Joel; Zanobetti, Antonella (28 June 2000). "National Morbidity, Mortality, and Air Pollution Study. Part II: Morbidity and Mortality from Air Pollution in the United States. Research Report 94-II, 2000". Health Effects Institute.
- Samet, Jonathan M.; Dominici, Francesca; Zeger, Scott L.; Schwartz, Joel; Dockery, Douglas W. (1 June 2000). "National Morbidity, Mortality, and Air Pollution Study. Part I: Methods and Methodologic Issues. Research Report 94-I, 2000". Health Effects Institute.
- Samet, J. M.; Lange, P. (December 1996). "Longitudinal studies of active and passive smoking". American Journal of Respiratory and Critical Care Medicine. 154 (6 Pt 2): S257–265. doi:10.1164/ajrccm/154.6_Pt_2.S257. PMID 8970398.
- Samet, Jonathan M. (1 November 1990). "The 1990 Report of the Surgeon General: The Health Benefits of Smoking Cessation". American Review of Respiratory Disease. 142 (5): 993–994. doi:10.1164/ajrccm/142.5.993. PMID 2240852.

=== Reports of the Surgeon General ===
- U.S. Department of Health and Human Services. The Health Consequences of Smoking: 50 Years of Progress. A Report of the Surgeon General. Atlanta, GA: U.S. Department of Health and Human Services, Centers for Disease Control and Prevention, National Center for Chronic Disease Prevention and Health Promotion, Office on Smoking and Health, 2014. (Senior scientific editor, Jonathan Samet.)
- Office on Smoking and Health (US) (2006). The Health Consequences of Involuntary Exposure to Tobacco Smoke: A Report of the Surgeon General (PDF). Atlanta (GA): Centers for Disease Control and Prevention (US). (Senior scientific editor, Jonathan Samet.)
- Office of the Surgeon General (US); Office on Smoking and Health (US) (2004). The Health Consequences of Smoking: A Report of the Surgeon General (PDF). Centers for Disease Control and Prevention (US). (Senior scientific editor, Jonathan Samet.)

=== Books ===
- Samet, Jonathan M.; Yoon, Soon-Young, eds. (2010). Gender, women and the tobacco epidemic. Geneva: World Health Organization. ISBN 978-9241599511.
- Maynard, Robert L.; Holgate, Stephen T.; Koren, Hillel S.; Samet, Jonathan M., eds. (1999). Air pollution and health. San Diego: Academic Press. ISBN 978-0-12-352335-8.
- Samet, Jonathan M; Spengler, John D, eds. (1991). Indoor air pollution: a health perspective. Baltimore: Johns Hopkins University Press. ISBN 9780801841255.
