= Modified risk tobacco product =

United States legal designation

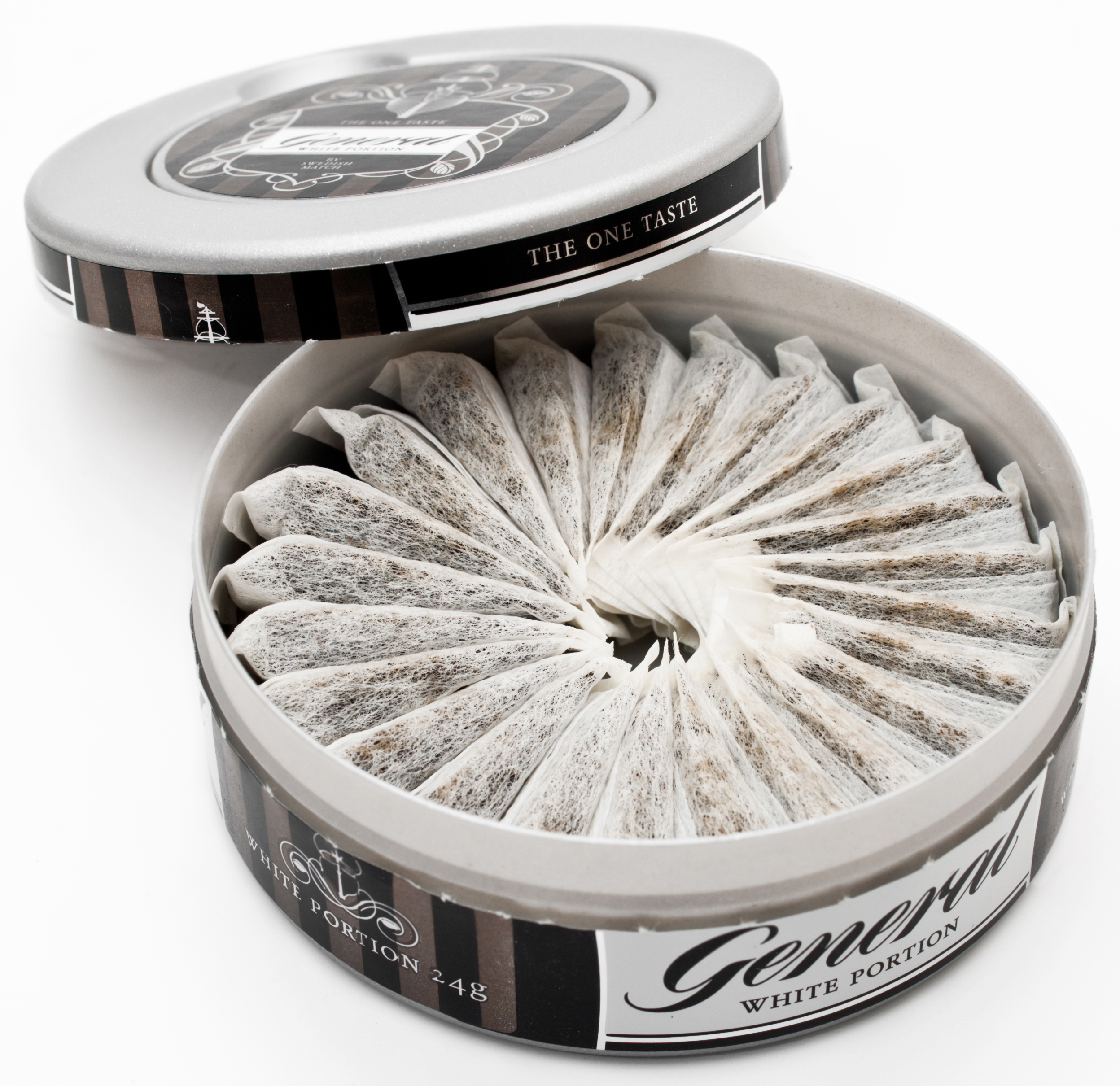
A brand of snus became the first FDA-approved MRTP, in 2019.

A modified risk tobacco product (MRTP) is a legal term in the United States for a tobacco product that poses lower health risks to users and the population as a whole than other products on the market, such as cigarettes (see health effects of tobacco). The Family Smoking Prevention and Tobacco Control Act of 2009 gives the US Food and Drug Administration (FDA) broad authority to regulate tobacco products, so the FDA's power extends to approving or rejecting MRTP applications.

Without approval from the FDA's Center for Tobacco Products, a tobacco company cannot legally make reduced risk claims or change warning label statements.

Under the FDA’s 2016 Deeming rule, additional products including electronic nicotine delivery systems (ENDS), like e-cigarettes, are also regulated as tobacco products when they are made or derived from tobacco or contain nicotine derived from tobacco. These products also require an MRTP order to be marketed with any FDA-authorized modified-risk claim.

General Snus from Swedish Match became the first FDA-approved MRTP in October 2019; the designation is valid for five years. In December 2021, the U.S. Food and Drug Administration (FDA) authorized the marketing of 22nd Century Group Inc.'s "VLN King" and "VLN Menthol King" combusted, filtered cigarettes as modified risk tobacco products (MRTPs), which help reduce exposure to, and consumption of, nicotine for users. These were the first combusted cigarettes authorized as MRTPs, and the second tobacco products overall to receive "exposure modification" orders, which allows them to be marketed as having less tobacco than other cigarettes.

== Applications accepted for review ==
An MRTP application submitted by smokeless tobacco maker Swedish Match in 2014 was the first ever accepted for review by the US FDA.

Swedish Match wanted approval to remove warnings about mouth cancer, gum disease, and tooth loss from packaging of eight of its General Snus products. The company also asked the US FDA to strike a statement reading "this product is not a safe alternative to cigarettes" as required by the Family Smoking Prevention and Tobacco Control Act. The company asked the US FDA to replace the statement with language acknowledging the harmful nature of all tobacco products and the reduced risk profile of Swedish snus by comparison. In December 2016, the FDA initially rejected Swedish Match's application on the grounds that its snus were not actually safer than other smokeless tobacco products or cigarettes. In October 2019, FDA finally approved the MRTP request for the product.

The US FDA has also accepted applications from the R. J. Reynolds Tobacco Company for removing warnings from its Camel Snus product and from Philip Morris International for permission to market its heat-not-burn tobacco product iQOS as safer than a traditional cigarette. was ultimately approved for sale in the United States using pre-market tobacco application method on April 30, 2019, which subjected it to marketing restrictions.

On 7 July 2020, the FDA issued exposure-modification MRTP orders for the Tobacco Heating System, authorizing a reduced exposure marketing and not a reduced-risk claims marketing. The FDA filed MRTP renewal applications for certain IQOS products for scientific review in May 2024 and made redacted application materials available for public comment. In 2025, the FDA scheduled a Tobacco Products Scientific Advisory Committee (TPSAC) meeting to discuss renewal of modified risk granted orders for IQOS heated tobacco products.

The FDA, on December 23, 2021, approved an MRTP application from 22nd Century Group for their VLN King and VLN Menthol King very low nicotine cigarettes (VLNC). These cigarettes have up to 96% less nicotine than conventional cigarettes and help reduce exposure to, and consumption of, nicotine for smokers who use them. These are the first combusted cigarettes to be authorized as MRTPs and the second tobacco products overall to receive "exposure modification" orders, which allows them to be marketed as having a reduced level of, or presenting a reduced exposure to, a substance.

On 17 June 2025, the FDA opened a public-comment docket for MRTP applications submitted by Swedish Match U.S.A., Inc. for ZYN oral nicotine pouch products containing nicotine derived from tobacco. The TPSAC meeting to discuss the MRTP application was scheduled for 22 January 2026.

In March 2023, the FDA authorized U.S. Smokeless Tobacco Company’s Copenhagen Classic Snuff, to be marketed as an MRTP with a lung-cancer risk-reduction claim for adults who switch completely from cigarettes.

== Public FDA scientific advisory committee meetings ==
At the conclusion of public meetings hosted by the US FDA on April 9–10, 2015, the Tobacco Products Scientific Advisory Committee (TPSAC) voted against recommending a labeling change that would give Swedish Match's snus product a modified risk designation. The committee tied 4–4 in a yes or no vote when asked whether the snus product demonstrated substantially lower risk compared to cigarettes. The panel's recommendations are not legally binding.

On January 25, 2018, the TPSAC rejected Philip Morris' claims that its iQOS heat-not-burn tobacco product was safer than a traditional cigarette. The committee voted 8–0 with one abstention to reject Philip Morris' claim that switching from cigarettes to iQOS can reduce the risks of tobacco-related disease and 5–4 to reject its claim that iQOS is less harmful than a traditional cigarette. However, it voted 8–1 to approve Philip Morris' claim that iQOS contains fewer harmful chemicals than a traditional cigarette.
