= Tobacco marketing targeting African Americans =

Tobacco marketing targeting African-Americans is the practice of customizing tobacco products and advertising techniques specifically to African-American consumers. It is most commonly analyzed through the consumption of mentholated cigarettes, as it represents 47% of black adult smokers and 80% of adolescent black smokers.

== Background ==
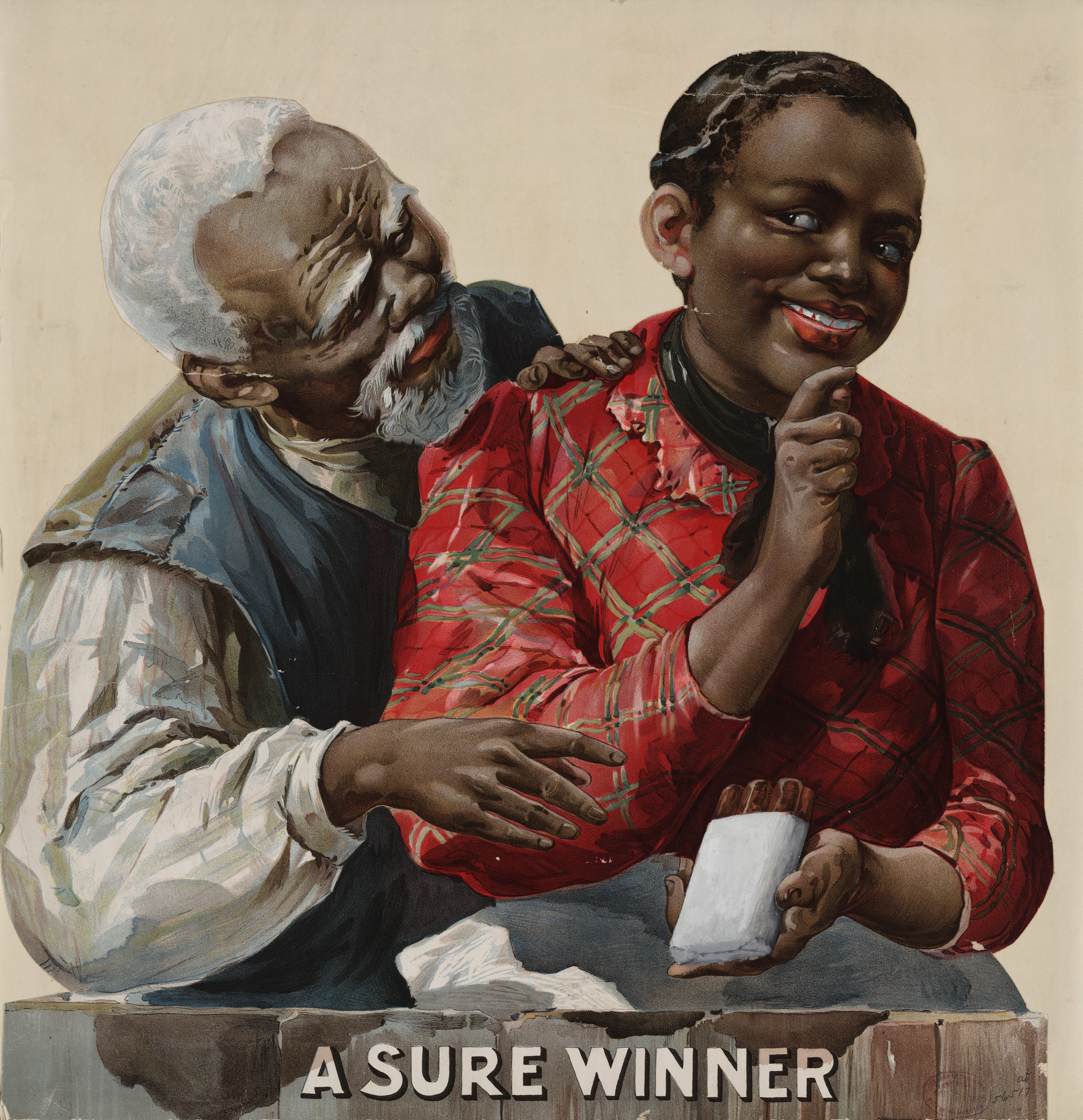
African-American couple depicted on tobacco advertisement, c. 1895

African-Americans are believed to be one ethnic group to suffer disproportionately from smoking-caused chronic and preventable diseases, evident in the approximately 45,000 African-Americans who die from smoking-caused illnesses each year. The 1998 report from the U.S. Surgeon General indicated that approximately 1.6 million African Americans under the age of 18 would become regular smokers, and about 500,000 of these individuals would die prematurely from tobacco-related illnesses.

The origins of the word cool stemmed directly from the jazz culture of the 1950s and 1960s. During this time the term cool went from a definition of cold to an urban definition of being: "The Birth of Cool". The Kool brand capitalized on this new culture of "coolness" in African-American culture that evolved from the Davis' jazz movement. They drew upon the idea of "coolness" to define their brand, Kool. It was then associated with a positive, glamorous self-image which embodied the idea of cool found in jazz.

== Description ==
=== Geographic targeting ===
In a 2002 study, it was found within poor, predominantly African-American communities there were more interior and exterior tobacco advertisements in retail outlets than in middle- to upper-class predominantly white communities.

A 2008 study in California found the number of cigarette ads per store, and the proportion of stores with at least one ad for sales promotion increased more rapidly in neighborhoods with a higher proportion of African-Americans. In 2007, there were 2.6 times more tobacco advertisements per person in areas with an African-American majority. Prior to the Tobacco Master Settlement Agreement banning tobacco billboard advertising in 1999, there was a significant increase in tobacco-related billboards in ethnic communities relative to white communities. Billboards were located mostly in lower income areas with a higher percentage of African-Americans, and there was a 70% higher chance that billboards were tobacco related. In St. Louis alone, 20% of billboard advertising and four of five most represented brands on billboards were tobacco-related. In addition, magazine ads for menthol cigarettes increased from 13% of total ad expenditures in 1998 to 49% in 2005. Recent studies have found that more cigarette ads are placed in African-American focused magazines, such as Ebony and Jet, than magazines like Time and People.

The average African-American adult has been exposed to about 892 tobacco-related ads, and youth, 559 tobacco-related ads. Among adult and youth smokers, Newport, Kool, and Marlboro are the most popular brands. About 42% of black adults smoke Newport, while 80% of young African-Americans smoke this brand as well. African-Americans are the top consumers of all menthol products. Some products were made specifically for African-American consumers, such as Marlboro Menthol Shorts, which were "exquisitely designed for the African-American lung."

=== Cultural targeting ===
Kool began using hip-hop brands with popular DJ's emblazoned on packs of Kool Menthol Caribbean Chill to entice minorities. During the period of 1995–1999, tobacco companies sponsored at least 2733 events, programs, and organizations throughout the United States. The minimum total funding of these sponsorships was $365.4 million. The sponsorships involved numerous small, community-based organizations that received funding and grants from larger umbrella organizations; many of these were part of the public health infrastructure.

== Legal issues ==
=== State Attorneys General vs. Brown & Williamson Tobacco Co. ===
The attorneys general of New York, Maryland, and Illinois filed suit against the Brown & Williamson Tobacco Co. over the marketing of Kool cigarettes. The lawsuits asserted that the company's 2004 Kool MIXX promotion, which was billed by the company as a supposed celebration of hip-hop music and culture, violated the 1998 Tobacco Master Settlement Agreement (MSA) by targeting African-American youth. The Kool Mixx campaign featured images of DJ's, young rappers, and dancers on cigarette packs and in advertising. All of the contests and events held appealed to the youth, especially African-American. At this time, B&W was introducing a new line of flavors using images of African-Americans.

A settlement was reached with R.J. Reynolds Tobacco Co., which acquired the assets of Brown & Williamson in July. R.J. Reynolds agreed to substantial limitations on all future "Kool MIXX" promotions and agreed to pay $1.46 million to be used for youth smoking prevention purposes. This was the first time that the tobacco industry had agreed to market limitations that are stricter than those set forth in the MSA.

Under the settlement, R.J. Reynolds agreed to significant restrictions on all future Kool MIXX promotions, including:

- Prohibiting use of the words Kool, Mixx, or House of Menthol on any merchandise;
- Prohibiting the use of hip-hop songs and interactive games on the CD-ROM;
- Limiting the distribution of CD-ROMs to adult-only facilities and by mail to known adult smokers;
- Prohibiting the sale of special edition packs in retail stores, and limiting distribution to adult-only facilities;
- Prohibiting the separate House of Menthol website; and
- Ensuring that any Kool MIXX print advertisements are placed in magazines with low youth readership.

=== Brown vs. Philip Morris, Inc. ===
In the case of Brown versus Philip Morris, Inc., Reverend Jesse Brown attempted to highlight the economic racism of cigarette marketing through a civil rights claim. The Brown complaint stated the "Defendant ha[s] for many years targeted African-Americans and their communities with specific advertising to lure them into using mentholated tobacco products." Brown raised the issues of discrimination, niche marketing, and the "staggering loss of life, premature disability, disease, illness, and economic loss" that were the result of the "Tobacco Companies international and racially discrimination fraudulent course of misconduct."

Brown contended that menthol cigarettes contained enhanced dangers over other cigarettes. Brown began by explaining the ingredient menthol contains compounds such as benzopyrene, which is carcinogenic when smoked. He argued that menthol cigarettes contain higher nicotine and tar levels than non-menthol cigarettes. Brown claimed menthol encourages deeper and longer inhalation of tobacco smoke, increasing addictive properties of the cigarette and decreasing the lung's ability to rid itself of carcinogenic components of smoke. Based on the evidence submitted by Brown, menthol cigarettes account for between 60–75% of the cigarettes smoked by African-Americans—and 90% percent of African-American youth smokers smoke menthols.

The case was dismissed by the United States Court of Appeals for the Third Circuit in 2001. By claiming transgression of the Civil Rights Act of 1866, originally written to protect recently freed slaves from a variety of discriminatory practices, the complainants of the Brown suit sought to show the unconstitutionality of targeting African-Americans with defective products. The Brown complaint failed to take into consideration that the menthol cigarettes were still posing a threat to non-African-Americans as well and that harm was being caused to more than just the African-American community.

== See also ==
- Nicotine marketing
- Menthol cigarettes
