= UK Vaping Industry Association =

British Trade association

- Abbreviation: UKVIA
- Formation: September 9, 2016; 9 years ago
- Founders: Group of leading vaping brands
- Type: Trade association
- Legal status: Company
- Purpose: Representing the e‑cigarette and vaping industry in the United Kingdom
- Location: London, United Kingdom
- Region served: United Kingdom
- Services: Advocacy for the industry
- Leader: John Dunne
- Funding: Members contributions
- Website: ukvia.co.uk

The UK Vaping Industry Association is a British trade association for the electronic cigarette and vaping industry in the United Kingdom. It has offices in Smith Square.

It has a 10 point code of conduct. This specifically prevents the marketing of vape devices to anyone under 18. It requires retailers to use “Challenge 25” in their stores, and have robust online age sales verification.

It has criticised "unscrupulous retailers" who sell electronic cigarettes to teenagers, which is illegal, and called for better enforcement of the law.

== History ==
Juul joined the association in March 2019.

It claims that vaping can make a significant contribution to the plans to eradicate smoking. They say: “Prohibitive policies that treat vaping in the same way as smoking simply continue to expose people to tobacco harm and run the risk of missing out on the massive public health prize represented by vaping.” According to the association "recent research has shown that vapers are three times more likely to quit than those who don’t vape.” They deny that vaping is a gateway to smoking. It deplored San Francisco’s decision to ban vaping, and said the situation as far as young people vaping was very different in the UK.

It organised a Vaping Industry Forum and Awards Dinner in November 2022. There were 300 delegates.

== See also ==
- Positions of medical organizations on electronic cigarettes
- Safety of electronic cigarettes
