= Tobacco Products Scientific Advisory Committee =

The Tobacco Products Scientific Advisory Committee (TPSAC) is an advisory panel of the United States Food and Drug Administration organized to provide advice, information and recommendations to the FDA commissioner on matters related to the regulation of tobacco products. It was created in accordance to the Family Smoking Prevention and Tobacco Control Act, signed into law by President Barack Obama on June 22, 2009. The Committee was inaugurated during its March 30–31, 2010 meeting.

== Structure and mission ==
TPSAC consists of 12 members, including a chairperson, all of whom are selected by the FDA commissioner from among experts in medicine, medical ethics, science and technology related to the manufacture and use of tobacco products. Nine voting seats are held for academics and practitioners in the field of health care, while three non-voting seats are held for industry representatives. Members serve for overlapping terms of four years. Meetings are held approximately four times per year, with all meetings publicly announced in the Federal Register at least 15 days before each meeting.

The Committee's purpose is to review and evaluate safety, dependence, and health issues relating to tobacco products and to provide appropriate advice, information and recommendations to the Commissioner of Food and Drugs on the following topics:

- The impact of the use of menthol cigarettes on the public health, including use among children, African Americans, Hispanics and other racial and ethnic minorities
- The nature and impact of the use of dissolvable tobacco products on the public health, including use by children
- The effects of the alteration of nicotine levels in tobacco products
- Whether, for any given tobacco product, there is a nicotine level low enough to preclude addiction
- Applications submitted by manufacturers for a Modified risk tobacco product

== Membership ==
- Chair: Jonathan M. Samet, M.D., M.S., Term: 02/16/10 - 1/31/14
- Acting Designated Federal Official: Cristi L. Stark, M.S.

=== Voting members ===
- Neal L. Benowitz, M.D. Term: 02/17/10 - 1/31/13
- Mark Stuart Clanton, M.D., M.P.H. Term: 02/17/10 -1/31/14
- Gregory Niles Connolly, D.M.D., M.P.H. Term: 02/16/10 - 1/31/12
- Karen L. DeLeeuw, M.S.W. Term: 02/16/10 - 1/31/13
- Dorothy K. Hatsukami, Ph.D. Term: 02/17/10 - 1/31/13
- Patricia Nez Henderson, M.P.H., M.D.
- Jack E. Henningfield, Ph.D. Term: 02/16/10 - 1/31/12
- Melanie Wakefield, Ph.D. Term: 02/16/10 - 1/31/14

=== Non-voting members ===
- Luby Arnold Hamm, Jr. Representative of the interests of tobacco growers. Term: 3/22/10 - 1/31/12
- Jonathan Daniel Heck, Ph.D., DABT Representative of the tobacco manufacturing industry. Term: 3/22/10 - 1/31/14
- John H. Lauterbach, Ph.D., DABT Representative for the interest of small business tobacco manufacturing industry. Term: 3/22/10 - 1/31/13

== Controversy ==
On March 1, 2010, the Wall Street Journal reported that proposed committee members Jack Henningfield and Neal L. Benowitz, had served as consultants to GlaxoSmithKline, and Benowitz to Pfizer as well, both pharmaceutical firms that market smoking cessation drugs. Their selection by the FDA has drawn criticism as "lax on conflict of interest" by the Boston Globe. Meanwhile, advocacy group Americans for Limited Government has raised concerns about funding received by TPSAC chair Jonathan Samet from GlaxoSmithKline and other pharmaceutical companies. In January 2011, Gregory N. Connolly resigned from the committee following allegations of conflicts of interest citing payments to provide deposition or trial testimony in lawsuits against tobacco companies.

In February 2011, Lorillard and R.J. Reynolds filed a federal lawsuit to try to block the advisory committee action or force the FDA to disregard its advice, stating three of the eight panel members had financial conflicts of interest from legal and consulting work against tobacco companies. On July 21, 2014, U.S. District Court Judge Richard Leon (Washington, DC) ruled that "FDA erred in determining that the members didn't have conflicts of interest" and that the appointments were arbitrary and capricious. FDA was also ordered to reconstitute the TPSAC.

== TPSAC Decision on Menthol Cigarettes ==
On March 18, 2011 the panel concluded that removing menthol cigarettes from the market would benefit public health in the United States, but stopped short of recommending that the FDA take any specific actions like restricting or banning the additive. A progress report on panel findings is expected in July 2011.

In March 2011, the tobacco industry released a report to the FDA in response to the TPSAC decision claiming menthol cigarettes are no riskier than regular cigarettes and should not be regulated differently. The U.S. District Court decision from July 21, 2014 ruled that "Conflicts of interest — whether actual or perceived — undermine the public's confidence in the agency's decision-making process and render its final product suspect", blocking the TPSAC report on menthol cigarettes from being used for regulatory purposes.

== TPSAC Interactive Public Docket ==
An Interactive Public Docket on the TPSAC was established to allow interested members of the public to discuss the Committee's work. The IPD includes discussion forums on TPSAC sub-topics including Studies and Concepts Under Review, Member Statements and Committee Governance.

== See also ==
- Family Smoking Prevention and Tobacco Control Act
- List of tobacco products
- Tobacco control
- WHO Framework Convention on Tobacco Control
