= Family Smoking Prevention and Tobacco Control Act =

2009 US federal statute

- Long title: To protect the public health by providing the Food and Drug Administration with certain authority to regulate tobacco products, to amend title 5, United States Code, to make certain modifications in the Thrift Savings Plan, the Civil Service Retirement System, and the Federal Employees’ Retirement System, and for other purposes.
- Nicknames: Tobacco Control Act
- Enacted by: the 111th United States Congress
- Effective: June 22, 2009

Citations
- Public law: Pub. L. 111–31 (text) (PDF)
- Statutes at Large: 123 Stat. 1776–1858

Codification
- Acts amended: Federal Food, Drug and Cosmetic Act; Cigarette Labeling and Advertising Act
- Titles amended: Title 21—Food and Drugs
- U.S.C. sections created: 21 U.S.C. § 387a-1 21 U.S.C. § 387f-1 21 U.S.C. § 387u

Legislative history
- Introduced in the House of Representatives as H.R. 1256 by Henry Waxman (D–CA) on March 3, 2009; Committee consideration by House Committee on Energy and Commerce; Passed the House on April 2, 2009 (298–112); Passed the Senate on June 11, 2009 (79–17) with amendment; House agreed to Senate amendment on June 12, 2009 (307–97); Signed into law by President Barack Obama on June 22, 2009

United States Supreme Court cases
- FDA v. Wages and White Lion Investments, L.L.C., No. 23-1038, 604 U.S. ___ (2025); FDA v. R.J. Reynolds Vapor Co., No. 23-1187, 604 U.S. ___ (2025)

The Family Smoking Prevention and Tobacco Control Act, (Pub. L. 111–31 (text) (PDF), H.R. 1256) is a federal statute in the United States that was signed into law by President Barack Obama on June 22, 2009. The Act gives the Food and Drug Administration the power to regulate the tobacco industry. A signature element of the law imposes new warnings and labels on tobacco packaging and their advertisements, with the goal of discouraging minors and young adults from smoking. The Act also bans flavored cigarettes, places limits on the advertising of tobacco products to minors and requires tobacco companies to seek FDA approval for new tobacco products.

== Origins and proposal ==
On March 21, 2000, the Supreme Court in FDA v. Brown & Williamson Tobacco Corp., in a 5–4 decision, held that the Federal Food, Drug, and Cosmetic Act, particularly when considering "Congress’ subsequent tobacco-specific legislation," that Congress had not given the FDA the authority to regulate tobacco products as customarily marketed. Thus the Family Smoking Prevention and Tobacco Control Act was introduced to respond to the decision, which had held that the Clinton administration's FDA had "overreached" its congressionally delegated authority, thus giving the FDA the authority the Court determined it had lacked.

== Legislative history ==
The bill passed the United States House of Representatives on April 2, 2009, by a vote of 298 to 112. The House bill had 178 cosponsors and the companion legislation in the Senate, S. 982 had 57 cosponsors. On May 20, 2009, the Senate Committee on Health, Education, Labor, and Pensions ordered the Senate bill to be reported favorably with amendments on a 15-8 vote.

The Capitol Hill newspaper The Hill reported on May 25, 2009, that Senate Majority Leader Reid planned to move on the bill during the month of June 2009. Senators Burr and Hagan of North Carolina were proposing alternative legislation.

On June 2, the Senate voted 84-11 to proceed to consideration of the House bill. On June 8, the Senate voted 61-30 on cloture on amendments to the Senate bill. The "Senate bill requires that cigarette health warning labels be large enough to make up 50 percent of the front and rear panels of the package and that the word “warning” appear in capital letters." On June 11, the Senate passed H.R. 1256 by a vote of 79-17, with 3 Senators not voting. Passage of the legislation came a week later than was originally scheduled. The Senate's version of the bill was approved by the House on June 12, by a bipartisan vote of 307-97.

Media accounts stated that the opposition in the Senate was largely from tobacco-farming states, particularly Kentucky, North Carolina, South Carolina and Georgia, with the only Democrat in opposition being Kay Hagan, from North Carolina. Notable exceptions were Virginia Senators Jim Webb and Mark Warner who supported the measure, despite the state's connection to the tobacco industry.

The Family Smoking Prevention and Tobacco Control Act was signed into law on June 22, 2009, by President Barack Obama.

== Provisions ==
- Creates the Center for Tobacco Products, a tobacco control center within the FDA and gives the FDA authority to regulate the content, marketing and sale of tobacco products.
- Requires tobacco companies and importers to reveal all product ingredients and seek FDA approval for any new tobacco products (see premarket tobacco application).
- Allows the FDA to change tobacco product content.
  - The ban on flavoring applies to any product meeting the definition of a "cigarette" according to section 3(1) of the Federal Cigarette Labeling and Advertising Act. This includes any tobacco that comes rolled in paper or a non-tobacco substance, and added to this definition in the Family Smoking Prevention and Tobacco Control Act is any tobacco with the purpose to be rolled such as rolling tobacco.
- Calls for new rules to prevent sales except through direct, face-to-face exchanges between a retailer and a consumer.
- Limits advertising that could attract young smokers.
- Requires cigarette warning labels to cover 50 percent of the front and rear of each pack, with the word warning in capital letters.
- Requires FDA approval for the use of expressions such as "light, "mild" or "low" that give the impression that a particular tobacco product poses less of a health risk (see modified risk tobacco product).

The bill makes no provisions that ban the import of the banned items for personal consumption, only for "sale or distribution." (Division A Title II Section 201)

== Reception and impact ==
Passing of the law was supported by the American Cancer Society, whose CEO said in a press release that "[t]his bill forces Big Tobacco to disclose the poisons in its products and has the power to finally break the dangerous chain of addiction for generations to come." The ACS press release also noted that the legislation would "require cigarette companies to disclose all ingredients used in cigarettes and to stop using words like 'light' and 'ultra-light' to give the impression that some tobacco products have a lower health risk." The legislation also garnered support from the American Heart Association, whose CEO said that the bill "provides a tremendous opportunity to finally hold tobacco companies accountable and restrict efforts to addict more children and adults."

The law was criticized by some as ineffectual, with community health sciences professor Michael Siegel stating that it "creates the appearance of regulation without allowing actual regulation." Critics argue that without the authority to eliminate nicotine completely, the reduction of nicotine levels in cigarettes may result in compensation by existing smokers, increasing their cigarette smoke inhalation to consume a level of nicotine which will satisfy their cravings. The Tobacco Control Act has been called "the Marlboro Protection Act" because it grandfathered in tobacco products marketed before 2007, while erecting nearly impassable financial and regulatory barriers for the introduction of competing products to the US market. These marketing restrictions enacted by the law make it more difficult to promote safer smokeless alternatives to cigarettes. The restrictions have been disputed on the grounds of free speech, with some stating that the legislation violates the First Amendment to the United States Constitution.

The bill bans flavored cigarettes, including cloves, cinnamon, candy, and fruit flavors, with a special exception for menthol cigarettes. Because Philip Morris is the largest producer of cigarettes in the United States and the law would have the effect of eliminating potential competition, the law has been nicknamed the Marlboro Monopoly Act of 2009. Philip Morris strongly supports FDA regulation. The exemption was reportedly influenced by the Congressional Black Caucus. The Tobacco Products Scientific Advisory Committee provisioned under the bill is to submit a recommendation on menthol cigarettes to the United States Secretary of Health and Human Services no later than one year after its establishment.

=== Lawsuits and constitutionality ===
On August 31, 2009, Commonwealth Brands filed suit (Commonwealth Brands, Inc. v. United States) against the United States and the Food and Drug Administration. Alleging that the advertising restrictions embodied in the FSPTCA unconstitutionally infringe on the First Amendment. These provisions include: restricting advertising to black-and-white text; restricting tobacco companies from advertising "light" cigarettes; prohibiting advertising within 1,000 feet of areas where children congregate; banning event sponsorship by tobacco companies; and prohibiting free sample distribution of cigarettes.

In June 2011, the FDA released nine new warning signs containing both graphic text and images that should be included on all cigarette packaging and advertisement by September 2012.

The textual warnings state: (Note: As of March 2020, these FDA warnings and images have been superseded by a new set of 11 warnings which focus on serious health risks that are less known by the public, each with an accompanying image depicting the negative consequences of smoking.)

WARNING: Cigarettes are addictive.
WARNING: Tobacco smoke can harm your children.
WARNING: Cigarettes cause fatal lung disease.
WARNING: Cigarettes cause cancer.
WARNING: Cigarettes cause strokes and heart disease.
WARNING: Smoking during pregnancy can harm your baby.
WARNING: Smoking can kill you.
WARNING: Tobacco smoke causes fatal lung disease in nonsmokers.
WARNING: Quitting smoking now greatly reduces serious risks to your health.

Each warning is to be paired with one of the following colored images: man exhaling cigarette smoke through a tracheotomy hole in his throat; plume of cigarette smoke enveloping an infant receiving a kiss from his or her mother; pair of diseased lungs next to a pair of healthy lungs; diseased mouth afflicted with what appears to be cancerous lesions; man breathing into an oxygen mask; bare-chested male cadaver lying on a table, and featuring what appears to be post-autopsy chest staples down the middle of his torso; woman weeping uncontrollably; man wearing a T-shirt that features a "no smoking" symbol and the words "I Quit."

Four tobacco companies responded to the mandate by filing a legal challenge in August:

- BBK Tobacco & Foods, LLP v. U.S. Food and Drug Admin., the plaintiffs argued that flavored rolling papers, as utilized in the process of roll-your-own-tobacco cigarettes, did not qualify as tobacco products under the FSPTCA
- Lorillard Inc. filed lawsuit in the U.S. District Court for the District of Columbia and was joined by R.J. Reynolds Tobacco Co., Commonwealth Brands Inc. and Liggett Group LLC, challenging the constitutionality of the FSPTCA, regarding free speech in advertising claims

The constitutionality of the provision requiring graphic warnings on cigarette packs has been questioned with tobacco companies and others saying that the new warnings violated the first amendment by going beyond being informational and require manufactures of a legal product to "engage in anti-smoking advocacy" on the government's behalf. R.J. Reynolds, Lorillard, Liggett Group and Commonwealth Brands, filed a lawsuit against the FDA in August 2011. Altria did not take any legal action. On November 7, 2011, US district judge Richard Leon granted a temporary injunction postponing the implementation of the new warnings, ruling that "It is abundantly clear from viewing these images that the emotional response they were crafted to induce is calculated to provoke the viewer to quit, or never to start smoking - an objective wholly apart from disseminating purely factual and uncontroversial information." The Court of Appeals for the D.C. Circuit upheld the District Court's opinion that the labels were unconstitutional, analyzing the labels under the Central Hudson standard. Before the D.C. Circuit issued its ruling, a divided panel for the Sixth Circuit Court of Appeals upheld the constitutionality of the Act in the case of Discount Tobacco City & Lottery v. FDA. On April 22, 2013, the Supreme Court declined review of the 6th Circuit's decision.

=== International litigation ===
On 12 April 2010, Indonesia filed a formal complaint with the World Trade Organization stating the ban on kreteks (clove cigarettes) in America amounts to discrimination because menthol cigarettes are exempt from the new regulation. Trade Ministry Director General of International Trade Gusmardi Bustami has stated that the Indonesian government has asked the WTO panel to review US violations on trade regulations, including the General Agreement on Tariff and Trade (GATT) 1994, Technical Barriers to Trade (TBT) and Sanitary and Phytosanitary (SPS) Agreement. The TBT Agreement is of special importance as it defines clove cigarettes and menthol cigarettes as "like products." Claims of discrimination are enhanced when noting that 99% of kreteks were imported from countries other than the United States (chiefly Indonesia), while menthol cigarettes are produced almost entirely by American tobacco manufacturers. Indonesia's case is further strengthened by comparing the number of young kretek smokers in America with the number of young menthol cigarette smokers. According to US health reports, 43% of young smokers smoke menthol cigarettes, which accounts for nearly 25% of the total cigarette consumption in the United States. Young smokers habituated to kreteks, however, account for less than 1% of cigarette consumption in the US, and <1% of the total cigarettes sold in the US. On 4 April 2012, the WTO ruled in favor of Indonesia's claim, though it is unclear how this will affect U.S. law.

The WTO was asked to bring this to the Dispute Settlement Body (DSB) for resolution in 2013 after the US failed to adhere to the findings scheduled to be implemented by the end of July 2012. They sought damages of reportedly $55 million claiming the US had not taken measures to meet compliance. The matter was moved to arbitration in line with Article 22.6 of the Dispute Settlement Understanding, the WTO agreement governing trade disputes. In June 2013 the two parties jointly asked the arbitrators to suspend circulation of this decision to the public and asked to keep the award confidential. Diplomatic meetings followed and in exchange for ending the controversy created by the ban of clove cigarettes the US agreed to refrain from submitting any WTO challenges to Indonesia's controversial mineral export restrictions. A Generalized System of Preferendes (GSP) scheme was pledged by the US which granted additional "facilities" that exceeded certain value limitations for the following five years.

== See also ==
- Tobacco Products Scientific Advisory Committee
- Tobacco Products Directive
- WHO Framework Convention on Tobacco Control
