= Center for Tobacco Products =

Agency of the United States Food and Drug Administration

Agency overview
- Formed: 2009
- Jurisdiction: United States
- Headquarters: Silver Spring, Maryland
- Parent department: United States Food and Drug Administration
- Website: www.fda.gov/tobacco-products

The Center for Tobacco Products (CTP) was established by the United States Food and Drug Administration as a result of the Family Smoking Prevention and Tobacco Control Act signed by President Barack Obama in June 2009. The FDA center was responsible for the implementation of the Family Smoking Prevention and Tobacco Control Act.

== Purpose ==
The smoking prevention and tobacco law established regulatory controls for tobacco products:

- Setting performance standards for tobacco products
- Reviewing premarket applications for new and modified risk of tobacco product
- Requirement of warning labels for tobacco products
- Enforcing advertising and promotion restrictions for tobacco products

The U.S. mandated legislation was a historic milestone for the U.S. FDA. The enacted law used to assist with the federal agency regulatory efforts and initiatives to curb the suspected health hazards for tobacco products on an annual basis.

== Funding ==
The CTP is primarily funded through fees collected by the FDA imposed on tobacco manufacturers and importers.

== See also ==
- Little Lungs in a Great Big World, public service announcement series that is part of a campaign for the CTP
