= Chewing tobacco =

Type of smokeless tobacco product

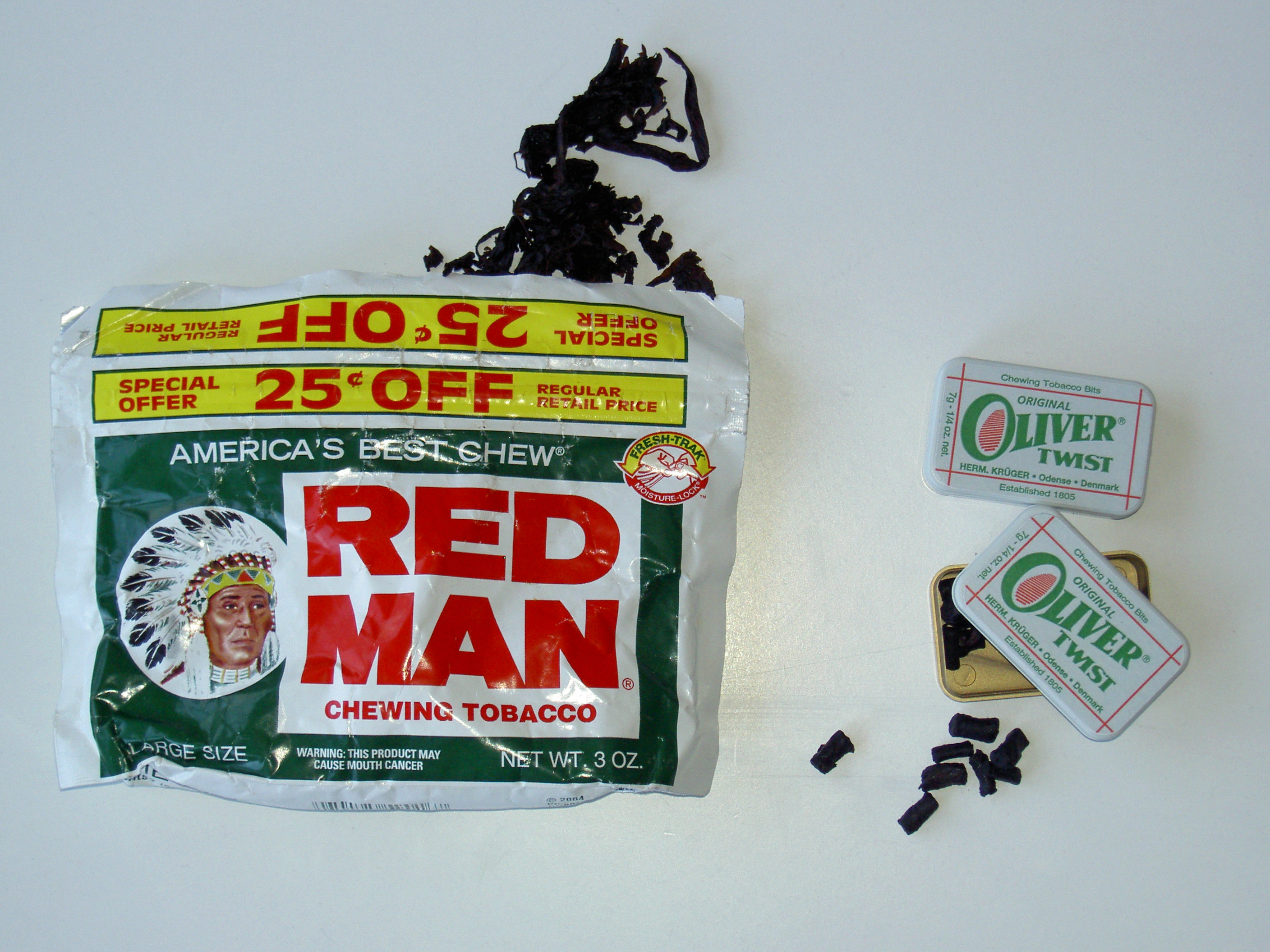
American Red Man loose leaf chewing tobacco and Danish pelletized Oliver Twist dip

Chewing tobacco is a type of smokeless tobacco product that is placed between the cheek and lower gum to draw out its flavor. It consists of coarsely chopped aged tobacco that is flavored and often sweetened; it is not ground fine like dipping tobacco. Unwanted juices are spat while chewing.

Chewing tobacco is a source of nicotine and therefore highly addictive. Quitting chewing tobacco use is as challenging as smoking cessation.

Using chewing tobacco can cause various harmful effects such as dental disease, oral cancer, oesophagus cancer, and pancreas cancer, coronary heart disease, as well as negative reproductive effects including stillbirth, premature birth and low birth weight. Chewing tobacco poses a lower health risk than traditional combusted products. However, it is not a healthy alternative to cigarette smoking. The level of risk varies between different types of products and producing regions. There is no safe level of chewing tobacco use. Globally, it contributes to 650,000 deaths each year. A 2019 Global Burden of Disease analysis estimated 273.9 million people aged 15 years and older used chewing tobacco worldwide, with most users living in South Asia. Meta-analysis noted in 2024 that global chewing-tobacco prevalence has increased since 1990 and that use appears particularly common among ages 15–19 in many countries.

== Types ==
Chewing tobacco may be left as loose leaves or compressed into a small rectangular "plug". Nearly all modern chewing tobaccos are produced by leaf curing, cutting, fermentation, and processing, which may include sweetening and flavoring. Historically, many American chewing tobacco brands popular during the American Civil War era were made with cigar clippings.

=== Loose-leaf ===
Loose-leaf chewing tobacco is the most widely available and most frequently used type of chewing tobacco. It consists of shredded tobacco leaf, usually sweetened and sometimes flavored, and often sold in a sealed pouch typically weighing 3 oz. Loose-leaf chewing tobacco has a sticky texture due to the sweeteners added.

=== Plug ===
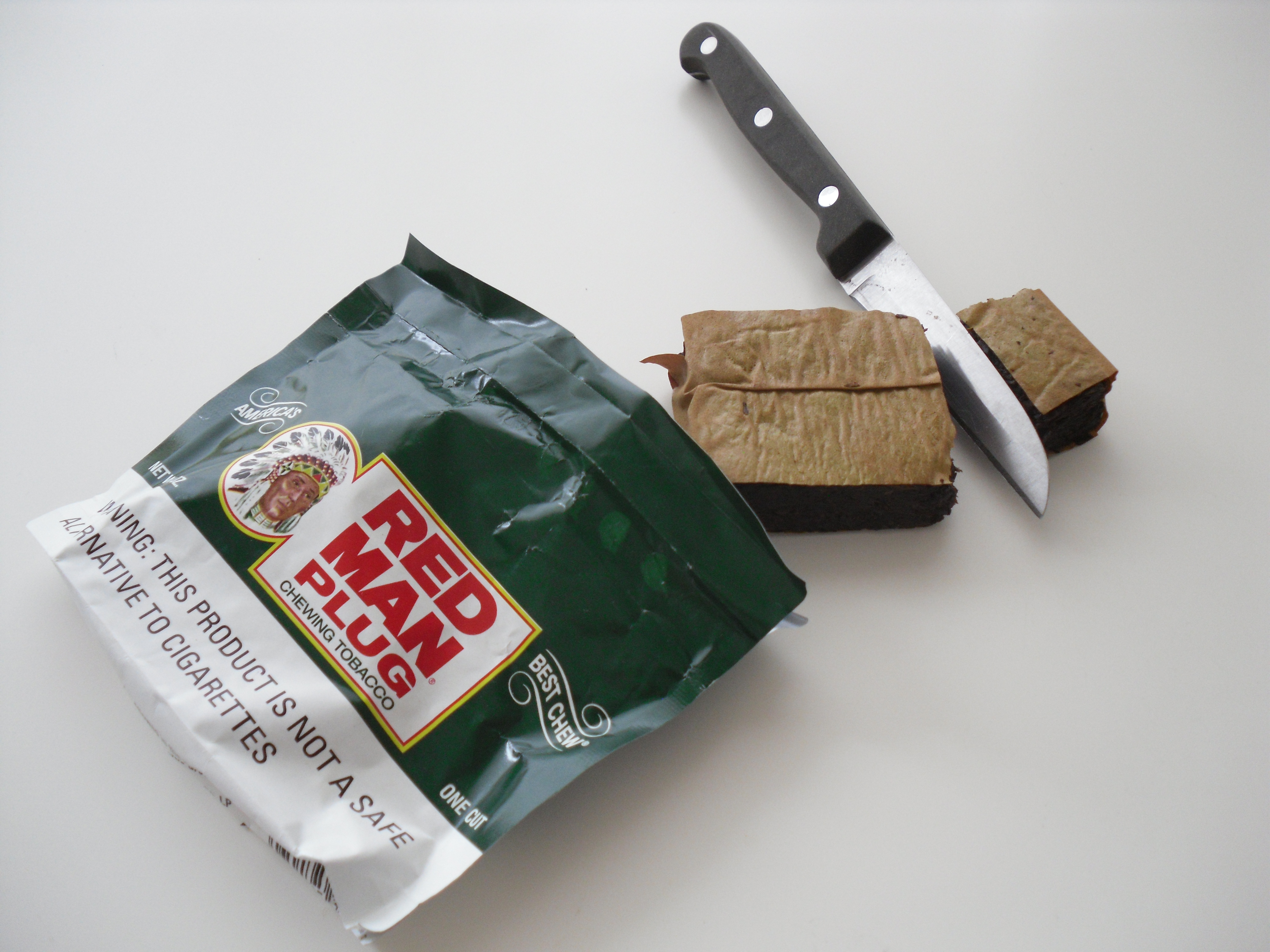
Red Man Plug chewing tobacco

Plug chewing tobacco is tobacco leaves pressed into a square, brick-like mass called a plug. From this, pieces are bitten off or cut from the plug and then chewed or minced by hand or tools and rolled to be smoked, being similar to using hashish plates. Plug tobacco is declining in popularity, and is thus less readily available than loose-leaf chewing tobacco. Historically, plug tobacco could be either smoked in a pipe or chewed, but today, these are two distinct products.

=== Twist ===
Twist chewing tobacco consists of leaves twisted together into a rope-like mass. Unlike most loose-leaf tobaccos, twist chewing tobacco is usually not sweetened. Pieces of twist are either bitten off or cut and then chewed. Twist chewing tobacco is not widely available and is mostly found in Appalachia. Historically, twists could also be smoked in a pipe, or ground up into nasal snuff.

== Health effects ==
Even though it is less dangerous than smoking, chewing tobacco is addictive, represents a major health risk, has no safe level of use, and is not a safe substitute for smoking. A 2024 U.S. Surgeon General fact sheet on tobacco-related health disparities notes that, despite declines in tobacco use, disparities persist across population groups, including higher tobacco use among people living in rural areas and in the South and Midwest. Globally it contributes to 650,000 deaths each year, with a significant proportion of these in Southeast Asia.

Using chewing tobacco can cause minor health effects such as dental disease, cardiovascular disease, asthma, and deformities in the female reproductive system. It also raises the risk of fatal coronary artery disease, fatal stroke and non-fatal ischaemic heart disease.

Quitting chewing tobacco use is as challenging as smoking cessation. There is no scientific evidence that using chewing tobacco can help a person quit smoking.

=== Cancer ===
Chewing tobacco is a cause of oral cancer, oesophagus cancer, and pancreas cancer. Increased risk of oral cancer caused by chewing tobacco is present in countries such as the United States but particularly prevalent in Southeast Asian countries where the use of smokeless tobacco is common.

All tobacco products, including chewing, contain cancer-causing chemicals. These carcinogenic compounds occurring in chewing tobacco vary widely, and depend upon the kind of product and how it was manufactured. There are 28 known cancer-causing substances in chewing tobacco products.

=== Cardiovascular disease ===
Using chewing tobacco increases the risk of fatal coronary heart disease and stroke. In 2010 more than 200 000 people died from coronary heart disease due to smokeless tobacco use. Use of chewing tobacco also seems to greatly raise the risk of non-fatal ischaemic heart disease among users in Asia, although not in Europe.

=== Effects during pregnancy ===
Chewing tobacco can cause adverse reproductive effects including stillbirth, premature birth, low birth weight. Nicotine in chewing tobacco products that are used during pregnancy can affect how a baby's brain develops before birth.

== Chewing tobacco and baseball ==
When the rules of baseball were first written in 1845, the carcinogenic potential of chewing tobacco was unknown. At that time, it was commonly used by players and coaches alike. Smokeless tobacco use became rampant by players by the early 1900s. The use of chewing tobacco in baseball steadily increased until the mid-20th century, when cigarettes became popular and took the place of some players' smokeless tobacco habit.

Joe Garagiola, who quit, warned about chewing tobacco:

"I tell these guys, 'You may not like what I say, but with lung cancer you die of lung cancer,'" ... "With oral cancer, you die one piece at a time. They operate on your neck, they operate on your jaw, they operate on your throat."

Bill Tuttle was a Major League player who made a big name for himself both through baseball and his anti-chewing tobacco efforts. Tuttle was an outfielder for the Detroit Tigers, Kansas City Athletics, and Minnesota Twins. He was an avid tobacco chewer; even his baseball cards pictured him with a bulge in his cheek from the tobacco. Nearly 40 years after he began using smokeless tobacco, Tuttle developed a tumor in his mouth so severe, it protruded through his skin. A few years before he died, Tuttle had many of his teeth, his jawbone, his gums, and his right cheekbone removed. He also had his taste buds removed. Tuttle dedicated the last years of his life to speaking with Major League teams about not using chewing tobacco where television cameras could see the players so that children could not witness and be influenced by it. He also dedicated time to the National Spit Tobacco Education Program, which was being run by friend and former Major League player, Joe Garagiola. Tuttle died on July 27, 1998, after a 5-year battle with cancer.

Hall of Fame outfielder Tony Gwynn died of salivary cancer on June 16, 2014. He claimed the cancer was linked to his lifetime use of chewing and dipping tobacco.

A 2016 MLB collective bargaining agreement prohibited all new Major League Baseball players from using smokeless tobacco. Reporting on the 2016 labor agreement described the restriction as applying to players new to the major leagues, with existing players grandfathered in.

Separately, local policies have continued to expand tobacco-free rules at professional sports venues: in October 2025, the Detroit City Council approved an ordinance prohibiting smokeless tobacco (including nicotine pouches) in Detroit professional sports stadiums (including Comerica Park), with refusal to comply subject to a misdemeanor and a $100 fine.

=== Effect on youth ===
Debate exists over whether players should be banned from using tobacco products during the games. The Major League Baseball Players Association disagrees, claiming it is a legal substance, so is acceptable to be used during games. Harvard School of Public Health professor Gregory Connolly, however, says, "the use of smokeless tobacco by players has a powerful role-model effect on youth, particularly among young males in sport, some of whom remain addicted in future careers as professional athletes." According to Connolly, one-quarter of Minor League players do not support allowing the use of chewing tobacco during games, and one-third of Major League players support abolishing it. Due to health concerns, MLB was asked to ban the use of chewing tobacco during the 2011 World Series between the St. Louis Cardinals and Texas Rangers.

=== Statistics ===
Teen use of smokeless tobacco has increased and it is more harmful and dangerous to tobacco user, while the use of all tobacco products by teens has decreased. This is true, especially among white and Hispanic males. In 1970, five times as many 65-and-older males used smokeless tobacco as 18- to 24-year-olds did (12.7% of the population were 65+ male users, 2.2% of the population were 18–24 male users). More specifically, moist snuff use increased for males ages 18–24 from 1% of the population to 6.2% of the population, while 65+ male users decreased from 4% to 2.2%.

A 2009 survey by The U.S. Centers for Disease Control revealed that 8.9% of U.S. high-school students had used smokeless tobacco on at least 1 day during the 30 days before the survey. Usage was more common among males (15.0%) than females (2.2%) and among Whites (11.9%) than Blacks (3.3%) or Hispanics (5.1%). The five states with the highest percentage of high-school users were Wyoming (16.2%), North Dakota (15.3%), South Dakota (14.6%), Montana (14.6%), and West Virginia (14.4%). More recently, the 2024 National Youth Tobacco Survey (NYTS) estimated current smokeless tobacco use at 1.5% among U.S. high school students (0.8% middle school; 1.2% overall).

Among U.S. adults, CDC estimates that 2.1% (about 5.2 million) reported current use of smokeless tobacco products in 2021; adult prevalence was highest in the Midwest (3.2%) and South (2.3%).

== Brands ==
Notable chewing tobacco brands include:

- America's Best Chew (formerly Red Man)
- Beech-Nut
- Copenhagen
- Grizzly
- Kodiak
- Levi Garrett
- Mail Pouch
- Oliver Twist
- Skoal
- Stoker's

== History ==
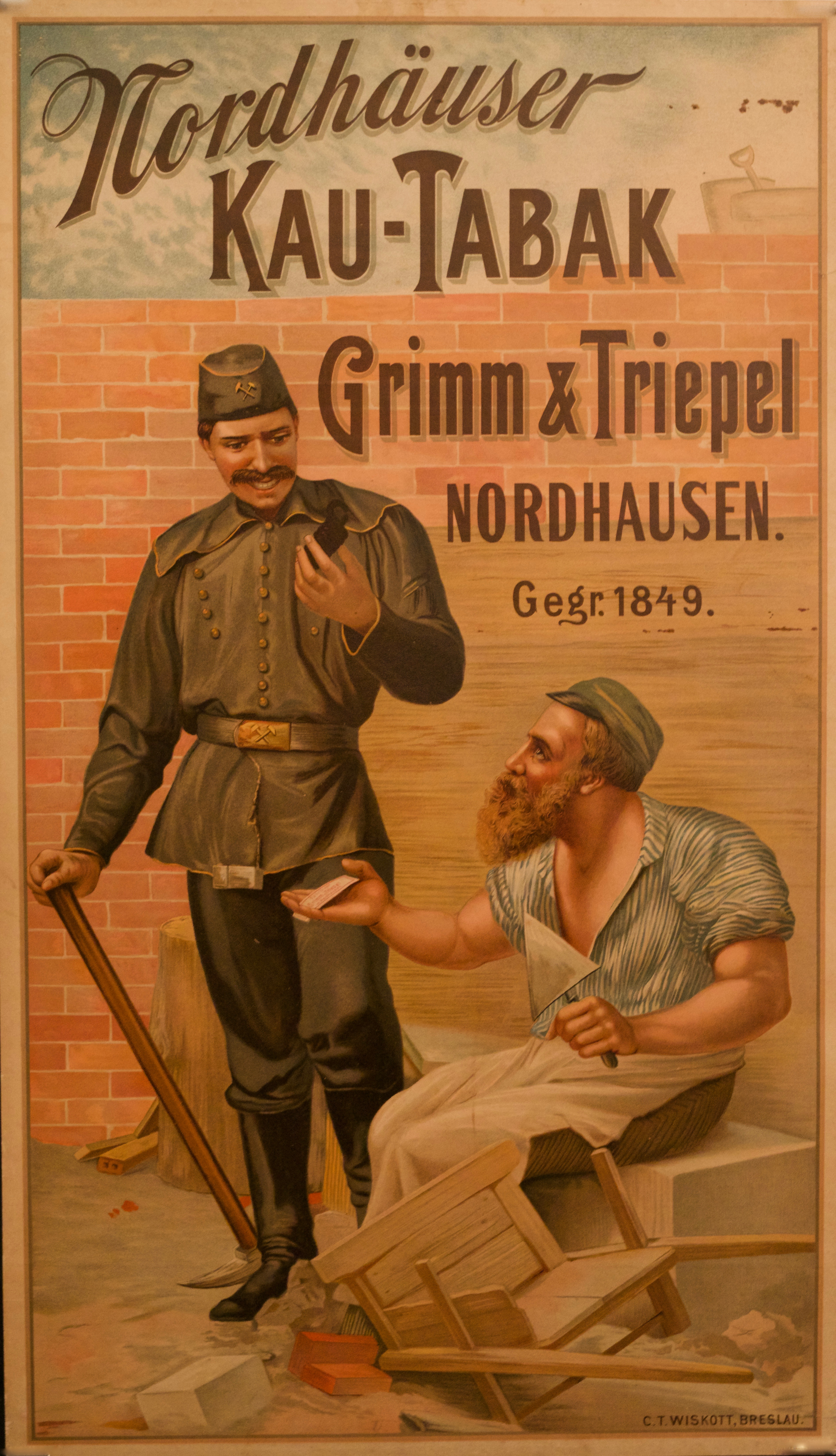
Historical advertisement of Grimm & Triepel Kruse chewing tobacco (1895)

Chewing is one of the oldest methods of consuming tobacco. Indigenous peoples of the Americas in both North and South America chewed the leaves of the plant long before the arrival of Europeans.

The Southern United States was distinctive for their production of tobacco, which earned premium prices globally. Most farmers grew some for their own use, or traded with neighbors who grew it. Commercial sales became important in the late 19th century, as major tobacco companies arose in the South, becoming one of the largest employers in Winston-Salem, North Carolina, Durham, North Carolina, and Richmond, Virginia. Southerners dominated the tobacco industry in the United States. So much so that a concern as large as the Helme Tobacco Company, headquartered in New Jersey, was headed by former Confederate officer George Washington Helme. In 1938, R. J. Reynolds marketed 84 brands of chewing tobacco, 12 brands of smoking tobacco, and the top-selling Camel brand of cigarettes. Reynolds sold large quantities of chewing tobacco, even though that market peaked around 1910.

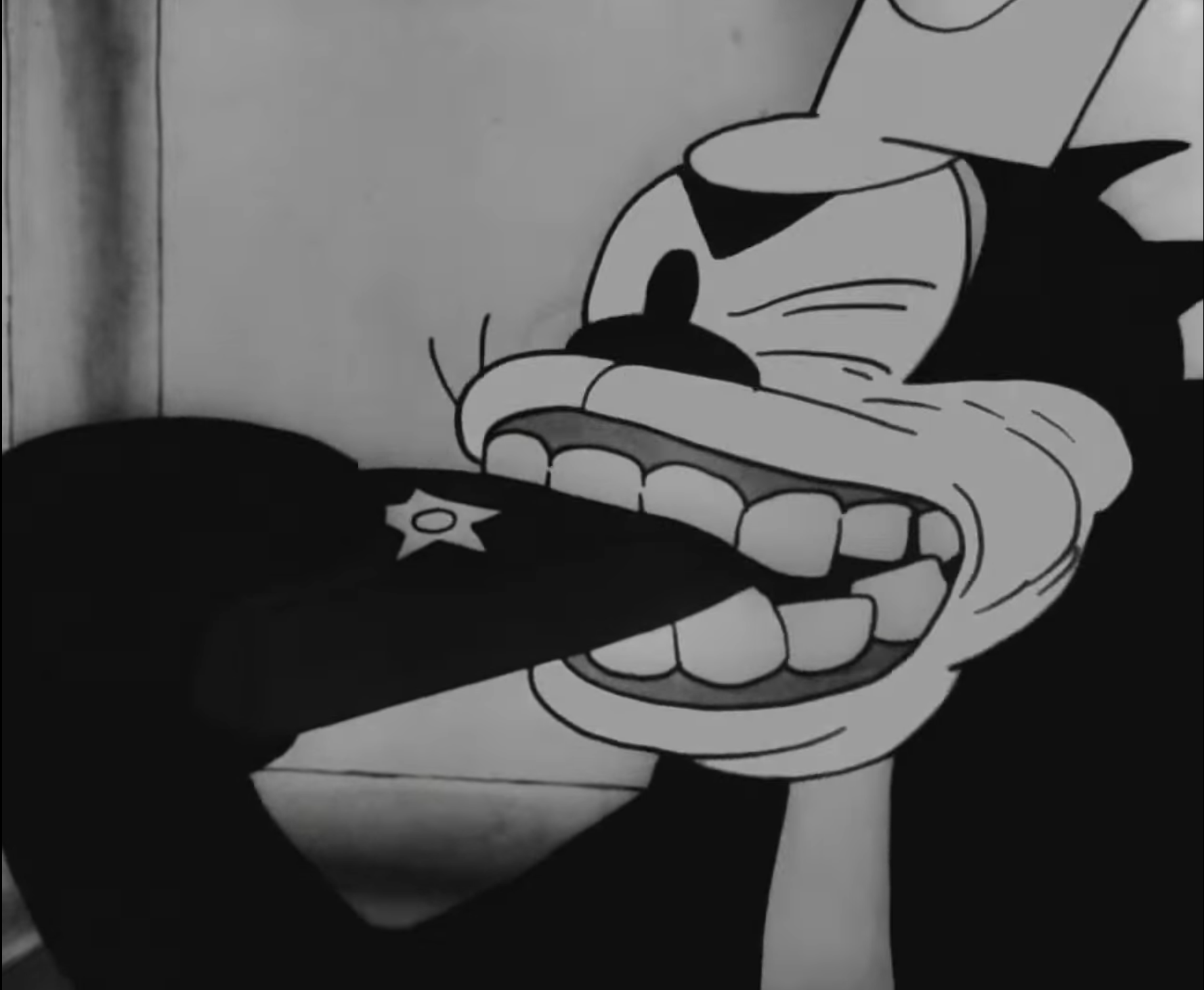
Pete, in the 1928 cartoon Steamboat Willie, biting into a plug of chewing tobacco

A historian of the American South in the late 1860s reported on typical usage in the region where it was grown, paying close attention to class and gender:

The chewing of tobacco was well-nigh universal. This habit had been widespread among the agricultural population of America both North and South before the war. Soldiers had found the quid a solace in the field and continued to revolve it in their mouths upon returning to their homes. Out of doors where his life was principally led the chewer spat upon his lands without offence to other men, and his homes and public buildings were supplied with spittoons. Brown and yellow parabolas were projected to right and left toward these receivers, but very often without the careful aim which made for cleanly living. Even the pews of fashionable churches were likely to contain these familiar conveniences. The large numbers of Southern men, and these were of the better class (officers in the Confederate army and planters, worth $20,000 or more, and barred from general amnesty) who presented themselves for the pardon of President Johnson, while they sat awaiting his pleasure in the ante-room at the White House, covered its floor with pools and rivulets of their spittle. An observant traveller in the South in 1865 said that in his belief seven-tenths of all persons above the age of twelve years, both male and female, used tobacco in some form. Women could be seen at the doors of their cabins in their bare feet, in their dirty one-piece cotton garments, their chairs tipped back, smoking pipes made of corn cobs into which were fitted reed stems or goose quills. Boys of eight or nine years of age and half-grown girls smoked. Women and girls "dipped" in their houses, on their porches, in the public parlours of hotels and in the streets.

During surrender negotiations between Sherman and Generals Johnston and Breckenridge at Bennet Place, the later was vigorously chewing before and after he was given a drink of whiskey by Sherman.

Chewing tobacco is still used, predominantly by young males in some parts of the American South, but also in other areas and age groups. In September 2006, both the Republican and Democratic candidates for Senator from Virginia admitted to chewing tobacco and agreed that it sets a bad example for children.

In the late 19th century, during the peak in popularity of chewing tobacco in the Western United States, a device known as the spittoon was a ubiquitous feature throughout places both private and public (e.g. parlors and passenger cars). The purpose of the spittoon was to provide a receptacle for excess juices and spittle accumulated from the oral use of tobacco. As chewing tobacco's popularity declined throughout the years, the spittoon became merely a relic of the Old West and is rarely seen outside museums. Spittoons are still present on the floor of the U.S. Senate's old chamber, honored as tradition.

== See also ==
- Betel chewing
- Big League Chew
- Gutka
- Herbal smokeless tobacco
- Naswar
- Smokeless tobacco
- Snuff (tobacco)
