= Oliver Twist Tobacco =

Scandinavian smokeless tobacco brand

Oliver Twist is a brand name of smokeless tobacco manufactured by House of Oliver Twist of Odense, Denmark.

The product contains natural nicotine in such small portions is classed as a ‘weak’ form of dip. The tobacco’s flavours are well known for its long lasting taste thus being enriched with sugar.

== Usage ==
Unlike its name suggests, Oliver Twist is not chewed. Instead, like dip, the bits are simply inserted between the lip and gum and left to absorb through the mouth. Unlike most dipping tobacco products (especially the American varieties, such as Skoal), Oliver Twist is not loose, but rather formed into a cylindrical plug for easier clean-up and more discreet consumption. The pellets are very small, approximately 1 by 0.5 cm (0.39 by 0.20 in) and are made from a single leaf.

As the product's description reads on its packaging:

Smokeless tobacco. Keep between cheek and gum - don't chew - its long lasting flavor gives you discreet tobacco satisfaction without expectorating. When the taste is gone, the pellet is easily removed.

== History ==
Oliver Twist has been manufactured in Odense, Denmark, by House of Oliver Twist A/S since 1805. It is imported into the US by RBJ Sales, Inc. of Dresden, Tennessee.

In 2018, the company was sold to Swedish Match. The company had been owned by the Drest Nielsen family since 1974.

== Varieties ==
Oliver Twist is available in various flavors: Tropical (flavored with anise), Black (flavoured with salmiak liquorice), Royal (flavored with English licorice), Sunberry (blackcurrant-flavored), Eucalyptus, Mint, Citrus, Wintergreen, Arctic, Bergamot and Original (sweet licorice).
