= U.S. Smokeless Tobacco Company =

American tobacco company

- Formerly: Mason Tour (1822–1870); Weyman & Bros (1870–1905); American Tobacco Company (1905–1911); Weyman-Bruton Company (1911–1922); United States Tobacco Company (1922–2001); U.S. Smokeless Tobacco Company (2001–present)
- Company type: Subsidiary
- ISIN: US02209S1033
- Industry: Tobacco
- Founded: 1822; 204 years ago in Pittsburgh, Pennsylvania, U.S.
- Founder: George Weyman
- Headquarters: Richmond, Virginia, U.S.
- Areas served: Worldwide
- Key people: Michael Brace (CEO); Greg Shiflett (VP)
- Products: Snuff, chewing tobacco, dipping tobacco, and snus
- Brands: Copenhagen, Skoal, Red Seal and Husky
- Parent: Altria Group
- Website: www.ussmokeless.com/en
- Footnotes / references Carcinogenicity: IARC group 1

U.S. Smokeless Tobacco Company (formerly United States Tobacco Company) is an American company that manufactures smokeless tobacco products, notably dipping tobacco, as well as chewing tobacco, snus, and dry snuff. The company is a subsidiary of Altria.

Its corporate headquarters are located in Richmond, Virginia, and it maintains factories in Clarksville and Nashville, Tennessee, Franklin Park, Illinois, and Hopkinsville, Kentucky.

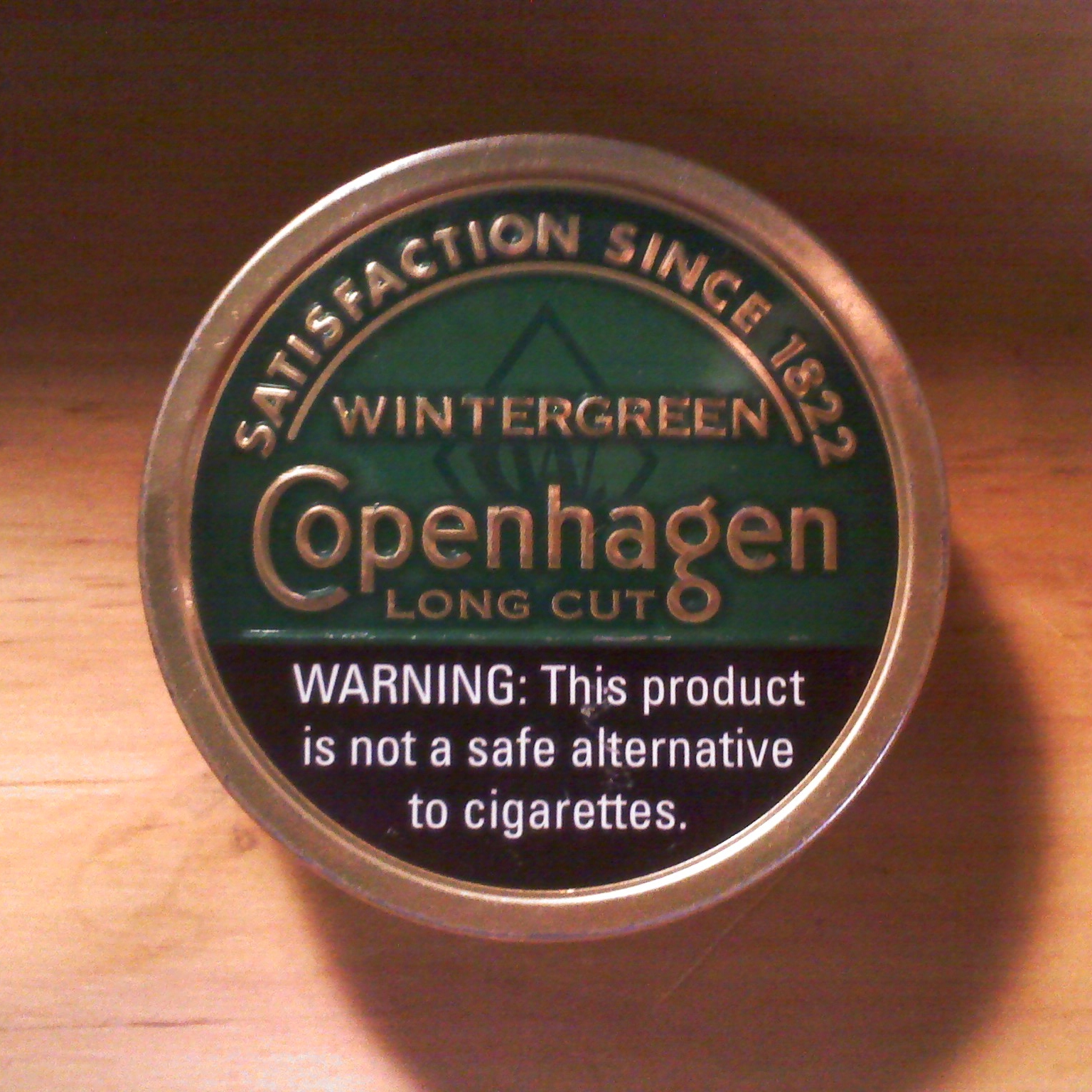
A can of Copenhagen Wintergreen Long Cut Dipping Tobacco

Copenhagen and Skoal are the company's best selling brands, and each represents more than $1 billion per year in retail sales. It also sells similar products under the brand names Red Seal and Husky. It also produced Rooster until 2009, when Philip Morris decided to discontinue it. The company also produces several varieties of dry snuff.

Skoal was one of the first moist tobacco manufacturers to offer dipping tobacco in pouches. Skoal Bandits, released in 1983, were marketed in the UK in the 1980s, but the carcinogenic tobacco pouches were banned amid public protest. The product has a small amount of tobacco in a pouch with a thin outer membrane that resembles a tiny tea bag. Skoal Bandits were invented by UST's marketing division, the manufacturing process was conceived by Gene Paules of UST, and the process was automated by David Westerman of the Automation Center, Inc., Nashville, Tennessee. Since then, Skoal has kept the Skoal Bandits products, but has also released regular-sized pouches, as well as snus, and offers pouches under the Copenhagen brand, as well.

Parent company UST was purchased by Altria Group, which now includes Philip Morris USA, John Middleton Company, and US Smokeless Tobacco.

== Company history ==
- 1822–1870 – Mason Tour
- 1870–1905 – Weyman & Bros
- 1905–1911 – American Tobacco Company
- 1911–1922 – Weyman-Bruton Company
- 1922–2001 – United States Tobacco Company
- 2001–present – U.S. Smokeless Tobacco Company

During the 19th century, chewing tobacco was distributed throughout the United States by George Weyman. Weyman was the inventor of Copenhagen Snuff, and after his death, Weyman & Bros was acquired by the American Tobacco Company. It is today known as the U.S. Smokeless Tobacco Company.

George Weyman was the father of two sons, William and Buckworth. After their father regained control of the tobacco company in the 1860s, he gave it to his two sons, when it was named Weyman & Sons Tobacco. Following their father's death, the brothers officially adopted the name Weyman & Bros Tobacco in the 1870s.
