= Tobacco use in Afghanistan =

Two types of tobacco are used in Afghanistan. Cigarette smoking, and naswar or moist snuff which is used through the mouth and nose. Global Youth Tobacco Survey (GYTS) held in schools of five provinces of Afghanistan showed high exposure to second hand smoke. According to WHO, about 35.2% of males and 2.1% of females in Afghanistan consume tobacco.

The average age for initiation of smoking in Afghanistan is 13 years.

Afghanistan joined WHO FCTC in 2010. According to data from the World Bank, smoking rates in Afghanistan decreased by around 20% between 2010 and 2020, from 29.1 to 23.3%.
