= Stoker's =

Brand of smokeless tobacco

- Company type: Private
- Industry: Smokeless tobacco
- Founded: 1940; 86 years ago
- Key people: Bobby B. Stoker
- Products: Dipping tobacco, chewing tobacco
- Website: Stokers.com
- Footnotes / references Carcinogenicity: IARC group 1

Stoker's Wintergreen can

Stoker's is a brand of smokeless tobacco, specifically dipping tobacco and chewing tobacco, based in the United States.

Stoker's is known for selling moist snuff in 12-oz tubs with a refillable can included. Tubs are sold with a plastic lid and a plastic base. One tub is the equivalent to ten 1.2-oz standard cans and single 1.2-oz cans are available in select markets. The label on the Stoker's can say that the Stoker's cut has more flavors.

In 2021, net sales of Stoker's Products amounted $124.3 million.

== History ==
Stoker's began as a family-run business by Fred Stoker, but is now run by Bobby Stoker. Fred Stoker began by producing and selling long-leaf tobacco in West Tennessee in the early 1900s. Eventually, this evolved into a mail-order bulk tobacco business. The company's first chewing tobacco, 24-C, was released in the 1940s. Differing from other manufacturers of chewing tobacco, Stoker's sells its chew in 16-oz bags, in contrast to the standard 3 oz. More recently, Stoker's has entered the dipping market.

== Varieties ==
=== Moist snuff ===
- Long Cut Wintergreen
- Long Cut Natural
- Long Cut Straight
- Long Cut Mint
- Long Cut Cool Wintergreen
- Long Cut Straight Bourbon Whiskey
- Fine Cut Wintergreen
- Fine Cut Natural

=== Chewing tobacco ===
- 24-C (8 and 16 oz)
- L-50 (8 and 16 oz)
- Apple (8 and 16 oz)
- Peach (8 and 16 oz)
- Black Wild Cherry (8 and 16 oz)
- Fred's Choice (8 and 16 oz)
- 24-M (16 oz)
- Tequila Sunrise (16 oz)
- Wintergreen (16 oz)
- Butternut (16 oz)
- Tennessee Chew Original (3, 8, and 16 oz)
- Tennessee Chew Moonshine (16 oz)
- Red Supreme (3, 8, and 16 oz)
