= Copenhagen (tobacco) =

Brand of dipping tobacco

- Type: Private
- Industry: Smokeless tobacco
- Founded: 1822; 204 years ago in Pittsburgh, Pennsylvania, United States
- Headquarters: Richmond, Virginia, United States
- Products: Dipping tobacco
- Website: freshcope.com

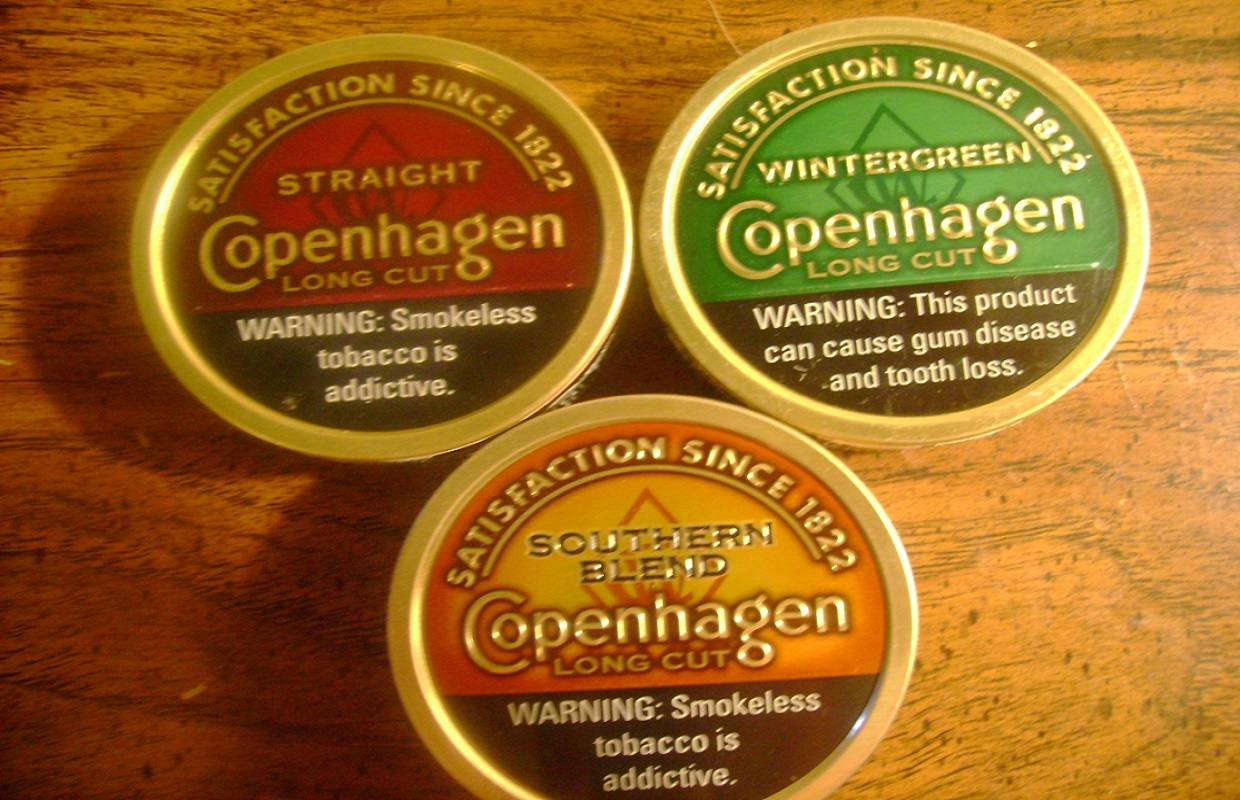
Three Copenhagen cans; Straight, Wintergreen, and Southern Blend

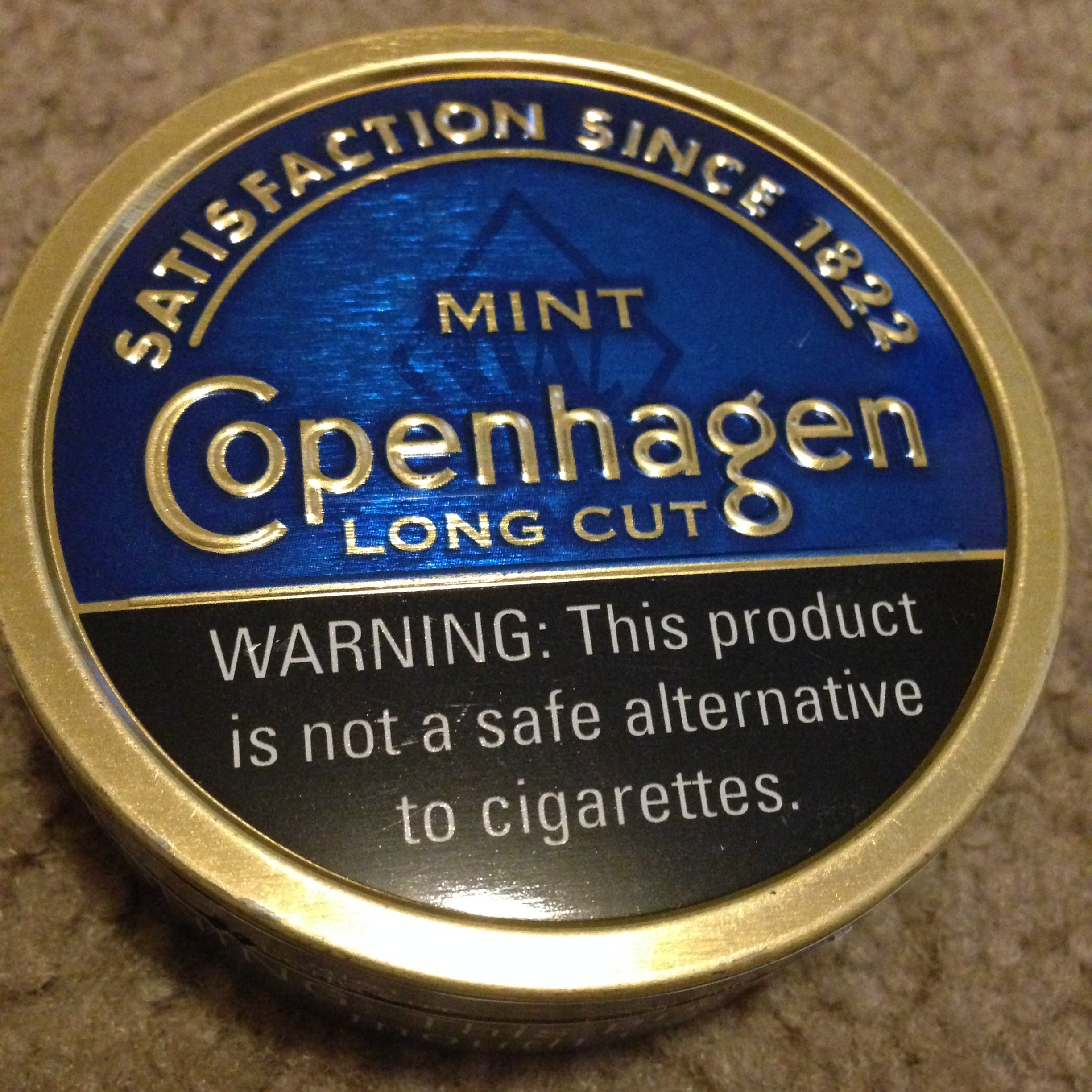
A can of Copenhagen Long Cut Mint moist snuff

Copenhagen is a brand of dipping tobacco made by the U.S. Smokeless Tobacco Company. Although it is considered a modified risk tobacco product (MRTP) it is still addictive and contains several chemicals that are known carcinogens.This is why a 2025 review article cautioned that the MRTP classification for Copenhagen Classic Snuff could contribute to public misperception and emphasized the need for post-market surveillance and discouraging initiation by non-users.

FDA materials state the product was previously marketed (without modified-risk information) as Copenhagen Snuff Fine Cut.

== Packaging and cuts ==
The product is available in pouches and different cuts of tobacco, including Fine Cut, Long Cut, and Extra Long Cut. Copenhagen Original Snuff, Long Cut, and pouches come in a 1.2 ounce can now made with a fiberboard bottom and metal lid, however, a few flavors still use the plastic bottom. The brand also offers other flavors like Wintergreen, Mint, Straight, Original, Southern Blend, and, seasonally, Black; all are available in long-cut, fine-cut, and pouches except for Black and Southern Blend. If it is offered as tax-exempt for use outside the US, the original flavor is packaged in an all-fiberboard bottom can with a tin lid, while all the rest of the flavors have a plastic can with the same lid as the original.

Copenhagen dipping tobacco delivers varying contents of nicotine, depending on the cut.

== Differences among types ==
In September 2007, Copenhagen's marketing team introduced "Cope" as a side brand. While two of the flavors introduced with this side brand were unique, Long Cut Straight was already offered under the main Copenhagen branding. "Cope" was marketed as being premium tobacco. The Cope brand was discontinued in 2017.

=== Pricing ===
Copenhagen has two levels of pricing within its line. Snuff, Original, Long-Cut, Original Pouches, and Weyman's Reserve are considered premium levels. In the United States, premium line dips are priced about one to two dollars more than their sub-premium counterparts, and all except the Weyman's Reserve come in fiberboard-bottom cans. The remaining flavors, Straight, Mint, Wintergreen, Natural, and Southern Blend, fall into a sub-premium level.

== History ==
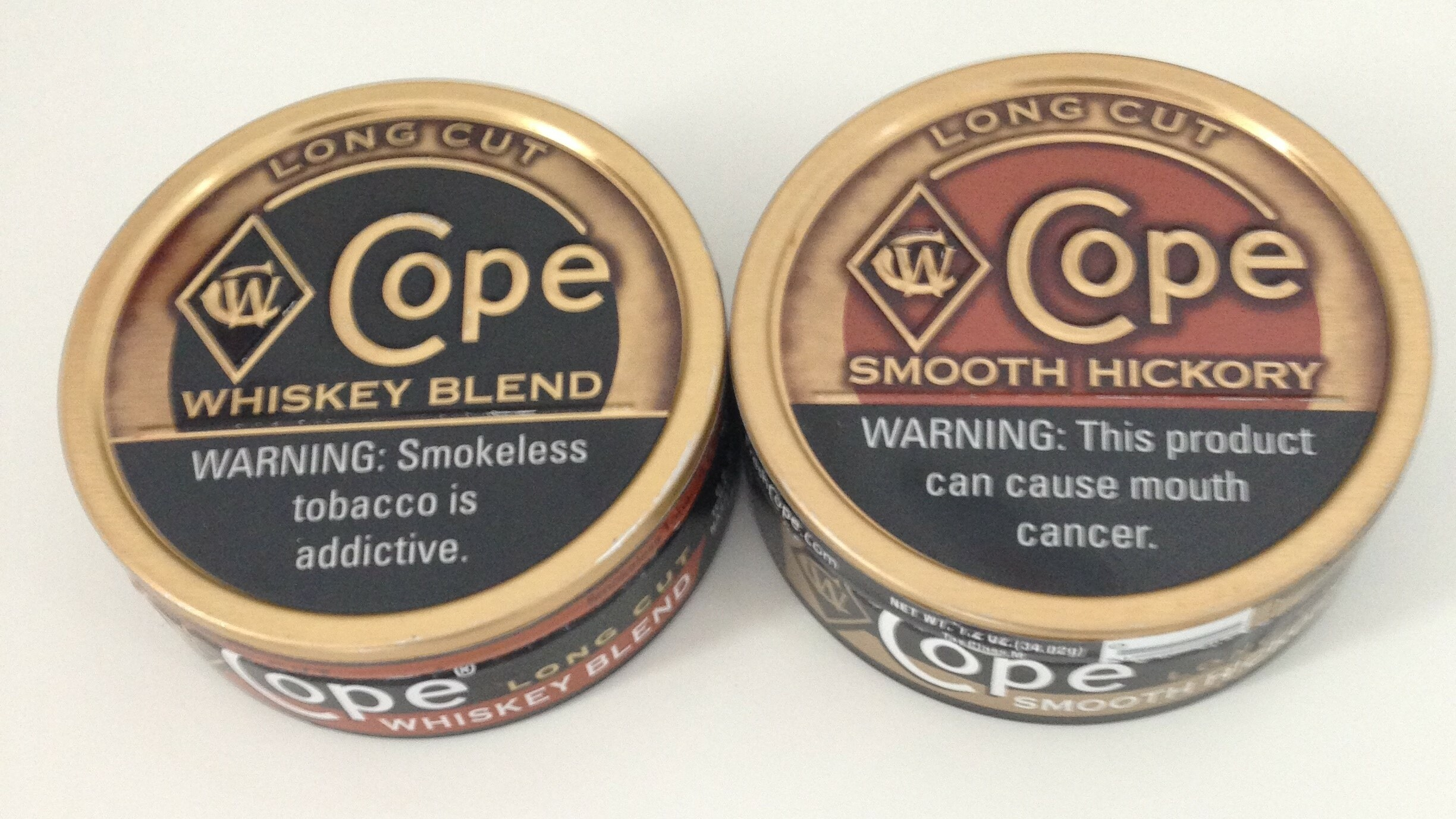
A can of Cope Whiskey Blend and Cope Smooth Hickory

- 1822: George Weyman begins producing Copenhagen Snuff in Pittsburgh, Pennsylvania.
- 1922: After a series of acquisitions and breakups, the company is renamed United States Tobacco Company.
- 1934: United States Tobacco Company introduces Skoal Wintergreen—the first of its kind for the company.
- 1968: Copenhagen introduces Copenhagen Snuff in a can.
- 1983: Skoal Bandits is introduced, breaking ground for Copenhagen to have its own brand of pouches.
- 1984: Skoal Long Cut is introduced, again a first for UST.
- 1997: Copenhagen Long Cut is introduced.
- 2001: Copenhagen Pouches (original flavor) is introduced.
- 2002: Copenhagen Mid Cut Black (Bourbon Flavored) is introduced.
- 2005: Copenhagen Long Cut Straight is introduced.
- 2009: Copenhagen Wintergreen Long Cut is introduced.
- 2011: Copenhagen Wintergreen Pouches is introduced.
- 2012: Copenhagen Southern Blend is introduced (only Eastern US)
- 2013: Copenhagen Mint Long Cut and Pouches are introduced in test markets.
- 2015: Copenhagen Wintergreen Packs, a more pliable and softer version of Copenhagen Wintergreen Pouches is released nationwide.
- 2016: Copenhagen Mint Long Cut and Pouches are introduced nationwide.
- 2017: Copenhagen Weyman's Reserve is introduced.
- 2017: Copenhagen Smooth Mint and Copenhagen Smooth Wintergreen are introduced in Pennsylvania for test marketing. They have yet to be released in any other states. The same year a recall of certain Copenhagen products manufactured at its Franklin Park, Illinois facility due to foreign metal objects reported in select cans.
- 2018: Copenhagen Southern Blend is introduced nationwide.
- 2019: Copenhagen Smooth Wintergreen is released nationwide.
- 2023: The FDA authorized Copenhagen Classic Snuff to be marketed as a MRTP with the claim that completely switching from cigarettes to the product reduces the risk of lung cancer; the authorization requires post-market surveillance and expires after five years unless renewed.

== Marketing and Advertising ==
Stanford University's SRITA tobacco advertising archive describes Copenhagen advertising as often using rural/outdoor imagery and targeting a 'rugged' theme; SRITA maintains a publicly accessible collection of Copenhagen advertisements for research and public inquiry.

== Varieties ==
- Copenhagen Original Snuff (Fine Cut): introduced in 1822
- Copenhagen Original Long Cut: introduced in 1997
- Copenhagen Original Pouches: introduced in 2001
- Copenhagen Mid Cut Black (discontinued): released in April 2011 Replaced by Long Cut Black.
- Cope Long Cut Whiskey Blend (discontinued): released September 17, 2007
- Cope Long Cut Smooth Hickory (discontinued): released September 17, 2007
- Cope Long Cut Straight released September 17, 2007
- Copenhagen Long Cut Wintergreen: introduced in November 2009
- Copenhagen Extra Long Cut Natural: introduced in 2010
- Copenhagen Long Cut Straight: released in 2010
- Copenhagen Long Cut Black (discontinued)
- Copenhagen Wintergreen Pouches
- Copenhagen Mud Buttin
- Copenhagen Long Cut Southern Blend
- Copenhagen Long Cut Mint: released in March 2016
- Copenhagen Mint Pouches: released in March 2016
- Copenhagen Weyman's Reserve: released in late 2017
- Copenhagen Smooth Mint: released as a test product to Pennsylvania in late 2017
- Copenhagen Smooth Wintergreen: released as a test product to Pennsylvania in late 2017, and again in late 2018 to a wider market
- Copenhagen Fine Cut Wintergreen: released in 2023
