= Naswar =

Form of dipping tobacco

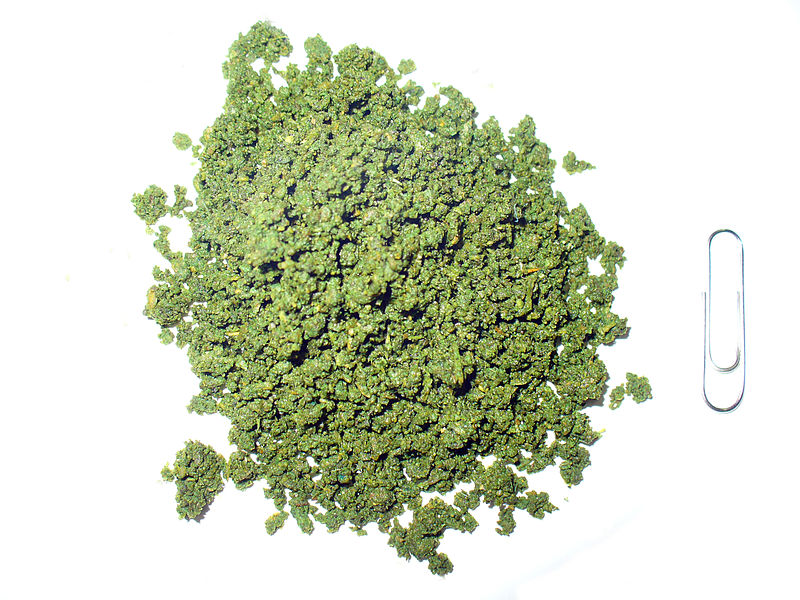
A pile of naswar

Naswār (Dari and Pashto: نسوار; Urdu: نسوار; also called nās (ناس), nāsor (ناسور) or nasvāy (نسوای), is a moist, powdered tobacco dip consumed mostly in Afghanistan and Pakistan, as well as in surrounding countries including Tajikistan, Kazakhstan, and Uzbekistan. Naswar is stuffed in the floor of the mouth under the lower lip, or inside the cheek, known as butt style stuffing, for extended periods of time, usually for 15 to 30 minutes. It is similar to dipping tobacco and snus. Swabi, Bannu, Dera Ismail Khan, Charsadda, Mohmand and Herat are renowned for their production of some of the highest quality Naswar.

Using naswar can cause a various harmful effects such as dental disease, oral cancer, oesophagus cancer, and pancreas cancer, coronary heart disease, as well as negative reproductive effects including stillbirth, premature birth, and low birth weight. Naswar poses a lower health risk than traditional combusted products. However it is not a healthy alternative to cigarette smoking. The level of risk varies between different types of products and producing regions. There is no safe level of naswar use. Globally smokeless tobacco products contribute to 650,000 deaths each year.

== Types ==
There are two forms of naswar; powder, and a paste cake style mixed with lime. It has a very pungent and powerful smell, resembling that of a fresh bale of coastal hay, and has a subtle flavor as it mixes with the saliva. The nicotine effect can occur within 5 minutes after intake, producing a slight burning sensation on the inner lip and tongue.

Nas: tobacco, ash, cotton or sesame oil, water, and sometimes gum.

Naswar: tobacco, slaked lime, indigo, cardamom, oil, menthol, water.

Naswār is made from sun and heat-dried tobacco leaves. These are added to slaked lime, ash from tree bark, and flavoring and coloring agents are mixed together. Water is added and the mixture is rolled into balls.

== Usage ==
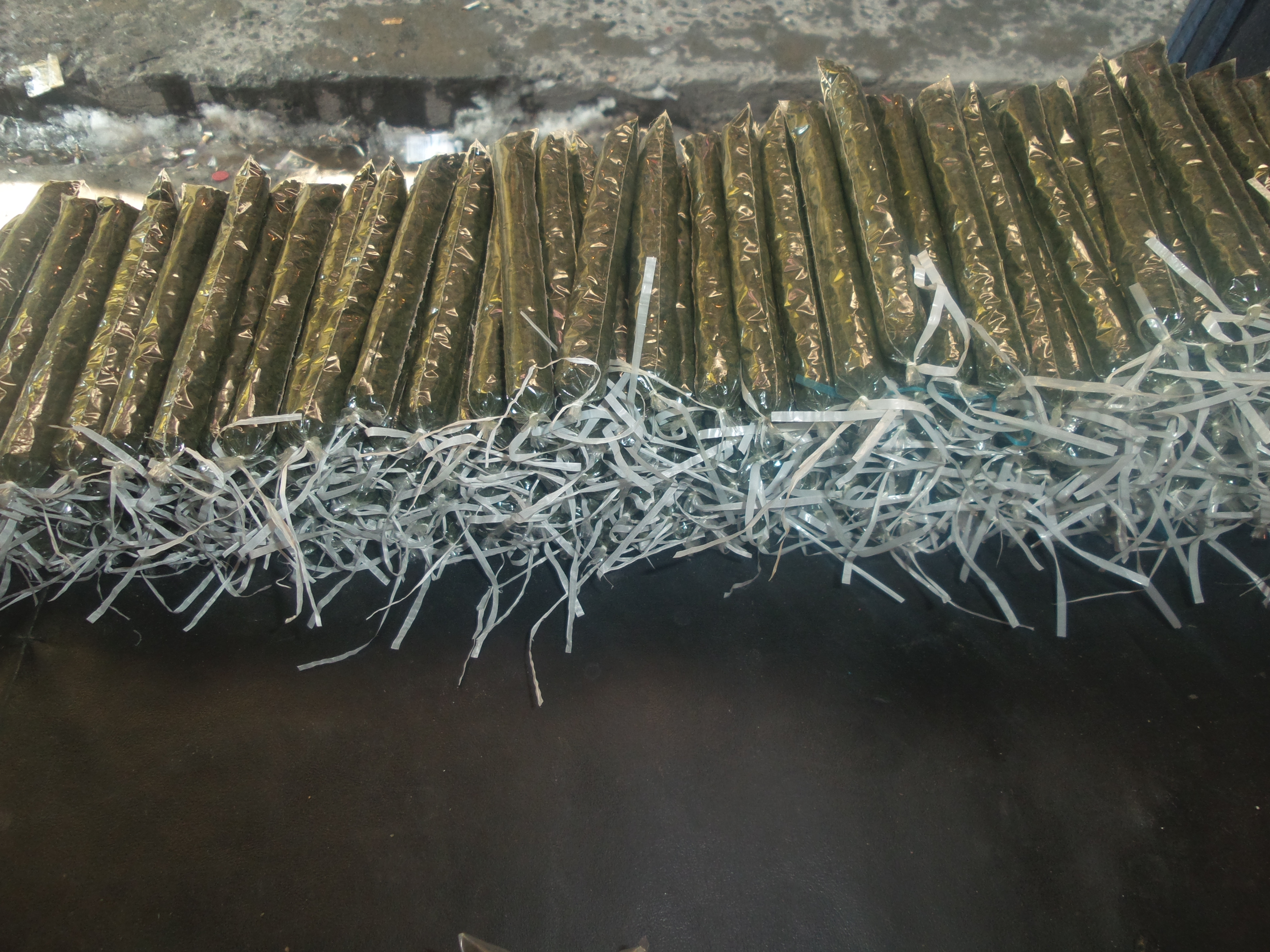
Packets of Naswar

=== South and Central Asia ===
The green powder form is used most frequently. It is made by pouring water into a cement-lined cavity, to which slaked lime (calcium hydroxide) and air-cured, sun-dried, powdered tobacco is added. Indigo is added to the mixture to impart colour, and juniper ash may be added as flavoring.

Currently, in countries of the region naswar is sold in markets, usually on trays with cigarettes and sunflower seeds. In Kyrgyzstan, a related form known as ''nasvay'' has been described by AFP as "hugely popular" in Central Asia, with Kyrgyzstan's health ministry saying consumption has increased in recent years. The only exception is Turkmenistan, where in 2008 President Gurbanguly Berdimuhamedow signed a decree banning the production, sale, use and import of naswar.

In 2011, naswar was included in the list of narcotic and psychoactive substances to be controlled in Kazakhstan.

In November 2006, an editorial in the newspaper Daily Times in Pakistan caused some controversy over its allegedly biased representations of Pashtun predilection for naswar.

=== Eastern Europe and Russia ===
In Russia, naswar is not a traditional product, but it has gained popularity especially among teenagers. It was sold in the markets of Moscow and in other cities of the Urals, Volga, and other regions of the country. Its trade was usually conducted on trays with spices. According to the association of tobacco distributors "Grandtabak", in the first half of 2004, Russia's import of naswar or "chewing tobacco" amounted to almost 67 tons (valued around 2 million US dollars), primarily from Kazakhstan, Kyrgyzstan and Tajikistan. On 23 February 2013, the Russian State Duma signed a federal law (N 15-ФЗ) which banned both wholesale and retail naswar from 1 June 2013.

Belarusian physicians have reported patients' medical information regarding naswar use to law enforcement agencies. In Estonia, naswar is distributed to nightclubs.

=== United Kingdom ===
Naswar is illegal in the United Kingdom. In February 2025, Solihull Council reported seizing packets of naswar during a trading standards inspection.

The ASH reported in March 2024, that in the UK smokeless tobacco products including naswar are most often used by Middle Eastern and South Asian Britons.

== Health effects ==
Even though it is less dangerous than smoking, naswar is addictive, represents a major health risk, has no safe level use and is not a safe substitute for smoking. Globally it contributes to 650,000 deaths each year with a significant proportion of them in Southeast Asia.

Using naswar can cause a number of adverse health effects such as dental disease, oral cancer, oesophagus cancer and pancreatic cancer, cardiovascular disease, asthma, and deformities in the female reproductive system. It also raises the risk of fatal coronary artery disease, fatal stroke and non-fatal ischaemic heart disease

Quitting naswar use is as challenging as smoking cessation. There is no scientific evidence that using naswar can help a person quit smoking.

=== Cancer ===
Naswar is a cause of oral cancer, oesophagus cancer and pancreas cancer. Increased risk of oral cancer caused by naswar is present in countries such as the United States but particularly prevalent in Southeast Asian countries where the use of smokeless tobacco is common.

All tobacco products, including naswar, contain cancer-causing chemicals. These carcinogenic compounds occurring in naswar vary widely, and depend upon the kind of product and how it was manufactured. A 2024 analysis of 14 commonly sold naswar brands from Khyber Pakhtunkhwa, Pakistan, reported an alkaline mean pH (8.61), identified 85 organic compounds (including nicotine as the most common), found high concentrations of metals (including iron, tungsten and copper), and detected aflatoxins (including aflatoxin B1 and B2). There are 28 known cancer-causing substances in smokeless tobacco products.

=== Cardiovascular disease ===
Using naswar increases the risk of fatal coronary heart disease and stroke. In 2010 more than 200,000 people died from coronary heart disease due to smokeless tobacco use. Use of naswar also seems to greatly raise the risk of non-fatal ischaemic heart disease among users in Asia, although not in Europe.

=== Effects during pregnancy ===
Naswar can cause adverse reproductive effects including stillbirth, premature birth and low birth weight. Nicotine in naswar products that are used during pregnancy can affect how a baby's brain develops before birth.

== History ==
Naswar was introduced into Western Europe by a Spanish monk named Ramon Pane after Columbus' second voyage to the Americas during 1493-1496. In 1561, Jean Nicot, the French ambassador in Lisbon, Portugal, sent naswar to Catherine de' Medici to treat her son's persistent migraine.

== See also ==
- Dipping tobacco
- Smokeless tobacco
- Snus
- Khat
