= Skoal (tobacco) =

Brand of smokeless tobacco

- Type: Private
- Industry: Smokeless tobacco
- Founded: 1934; 92 years ago
- Headquarters: Stamford, Connecticut, United States
- Products: Dipping tobacco, snus
- Website: Skoal.com

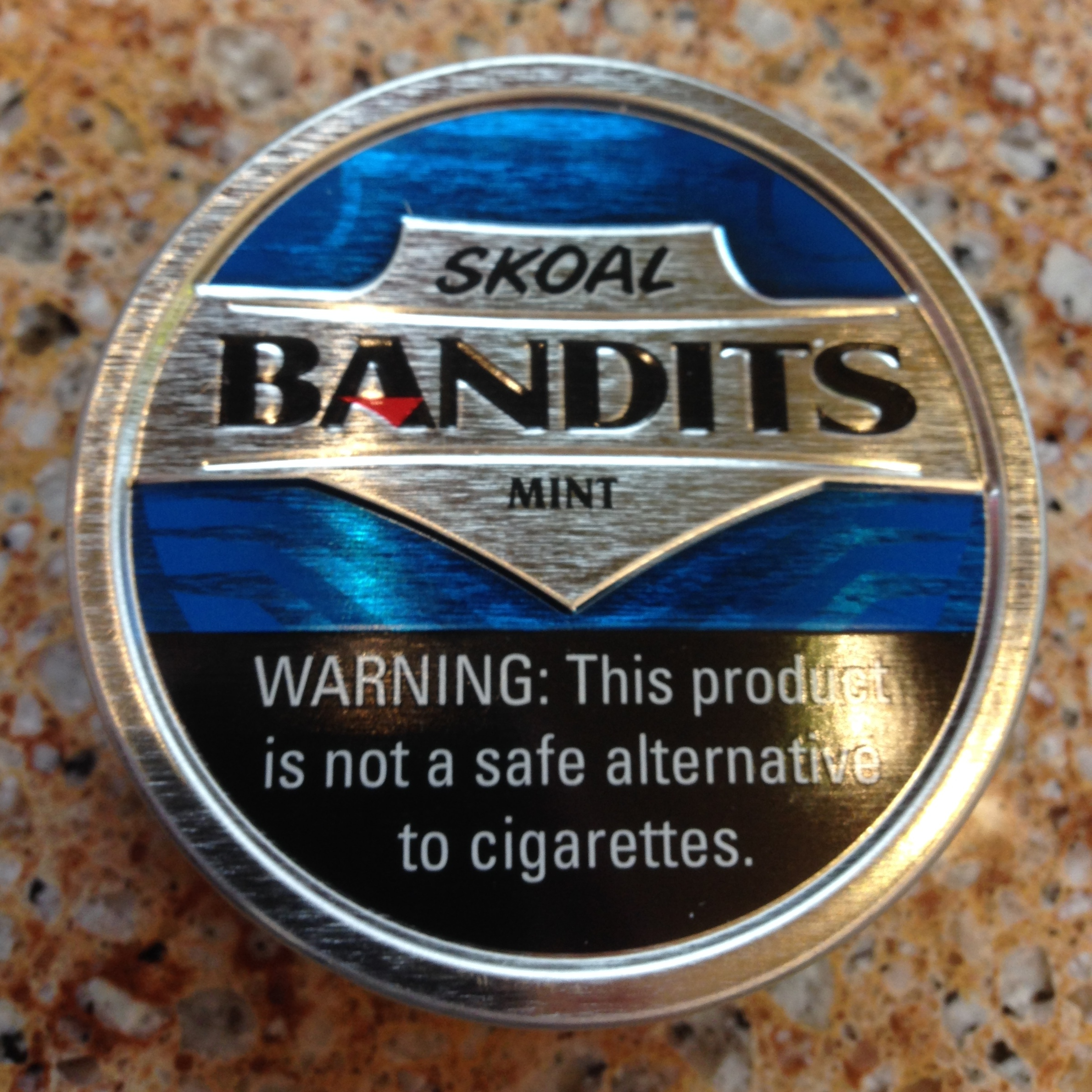
A can of Skoal Bandits Mint.

Skoal is an American brand of smokeless tobacco. First produced by the U.S. Smokeless Tobacco Company (USSTC) in 1934 as the first wintergreen flavored dipping tobacco, Skoal is considered a high-priced product within the dipping tobacco market. "Skoal" is an Anglicization of skål, a term used often in Scandinavia to announce a toast of friendship, with connotations of well-wishing.

== Nicotine level ==
A study conducted by scientists at R. J. Reynolds Tobacco Company using both the nicotine levels and free nicotine levels in common tobacco brands produced in 2006 generated the following ranked results:

Rank/order	Tobacco brand/variety	Nicotine Level (mg per gram)
1	Timberwolf Long Cut Winter Green	14.1
2	Copenhagen Long Cut	13.9
3	Longhorn Long Cut Winter Green	13.8
4	Renegades Winter Green	13.4
5	Skoal Long Cut Straight	13.4
6	Skoal Fine Cut Original	13.3
7	Red Seal Fine Cut	13.2
8	Husky Fine Cut	12.9
9	Skoal Long Cut Mint	12.9
10	Skoal Long Cut Winter Green	12.8
11	Copenhagen Original	12.7
12	Skoal Long Cut Cherry	12.7
13	Kayak Long Cut Winter Green	11.9
14	Copenhagen Pouches	11.2
15	Grizzly Long Cut Winter Green	11.2
16	Kodiak Winter Green	10.7
17	Cooper Long Cut Winter Green	8.0

Advancements in measurement. Using another measurement criteria known as the free nicotine level, a level which is generated mathematically using the nicotine levels and the pH level of the tobacco brand, the results are ranked on the chart below:

Rank/order	Tobacco brand/variety	Free nicotine level (mg per gram)
1	Kodiak Winter Green	8.2
2	Copenhagen Pouches	6.8
3	Grizzly Long Cut Winter Green	5.9
4	Longhorn Long Cut Winter Green	5.7
5	Copenhagen Long Cut	5.4
6	Timberwolf Long Cut Winter Green	5.2
7	Husky Fine Cut	4.8
8	Skoal Long Cut Straight	3.9
9	Skoal Fine Cut Original	3.9
10	Skoal Long Cut Mint	3.7
11	Copenhagen Original	3.2
12	Red Seal Fine Cut	3.1
13	Skoal Long Cut Winter Green	2.9
14	Renegades Winter Green	2.4
15	Kayak Long Cut Winter Green	2.3
16	Skoal Long Cut Cherry	1.7
17	Cooper Long Cut Winter Green	1.1

=== Nicotine level rankings ===
The results of this 2006 study on traditional moist snuff's most common varieties in terms of nicotine level only, show that Timberwolf Long Cut Winter Green, at 14.1 mg, is the highest, Copenhagen Long Cut, at 13.9 mg, is the second highest, and Longhorn's Long Cut Winter Green, at 13.8 mg, is third highest. The study also shows Cooper's Long Cut Winter Green, at 8.0 mg, is the lowest, Kodiak Long Cut Winter Green, at 10.7 mg, is second lowest, and Copenhagen Pouches and Grizzly Long Cut Wintergreen, both at 11.2 mg, tie for third last.

Skoal ranking Skoal, with a long cut range of 12.7 mg [tied for 11th strongest level, (Skoal Long Cut Cherry)], to a level of 13.4 mg of nicotine per gram of tobacco [tied for 4th strongest level, (Skoal Long Cut Straight)].

=== Free nicotine level rankings ===
However, in terms of the free nicotine level, it can be seen from the results that Kodiak Winter Green had the highest level at 8.2 mg, followed by Copenhagen Pouches at 6.8 mg, and Grizzly Long Cut Winter Green at 5.9 mg. The three lowest brands, were Cooper Long Cut Winter Green at 1.1 mg, Skoal Long Cut Cherry at 1.7 mg, and Kayak Long Cut Winter Green with a free nicotine level at 2.3 mg.

Skoal ranking. Skoal had a long cut free nicotine level range of 1.7 mg [tied for 16th strongest level, (Skoal Long Cut Cherry)] to 3.9 mg of free nicotine per gram of tobacco [tied for 8th strongest level (Skoal Long Cut Straight) and (Skoal Fine Cut Original)].

=== Mixed opinions on strength ===
From these results, it can be seen that Skoal ranks among the upper average in most varieties of its dipping tobacco. However, in the nicotine level chart, a measurement designed to read how much nicotine one actually receives while using the product, Skoal's varieties ranged from average (8th) to poor (2nd to last) depending on flavor and texture.

== Cuts and flavors ==
A tin of Skoal X-tra Crisp Blend Long Cut.

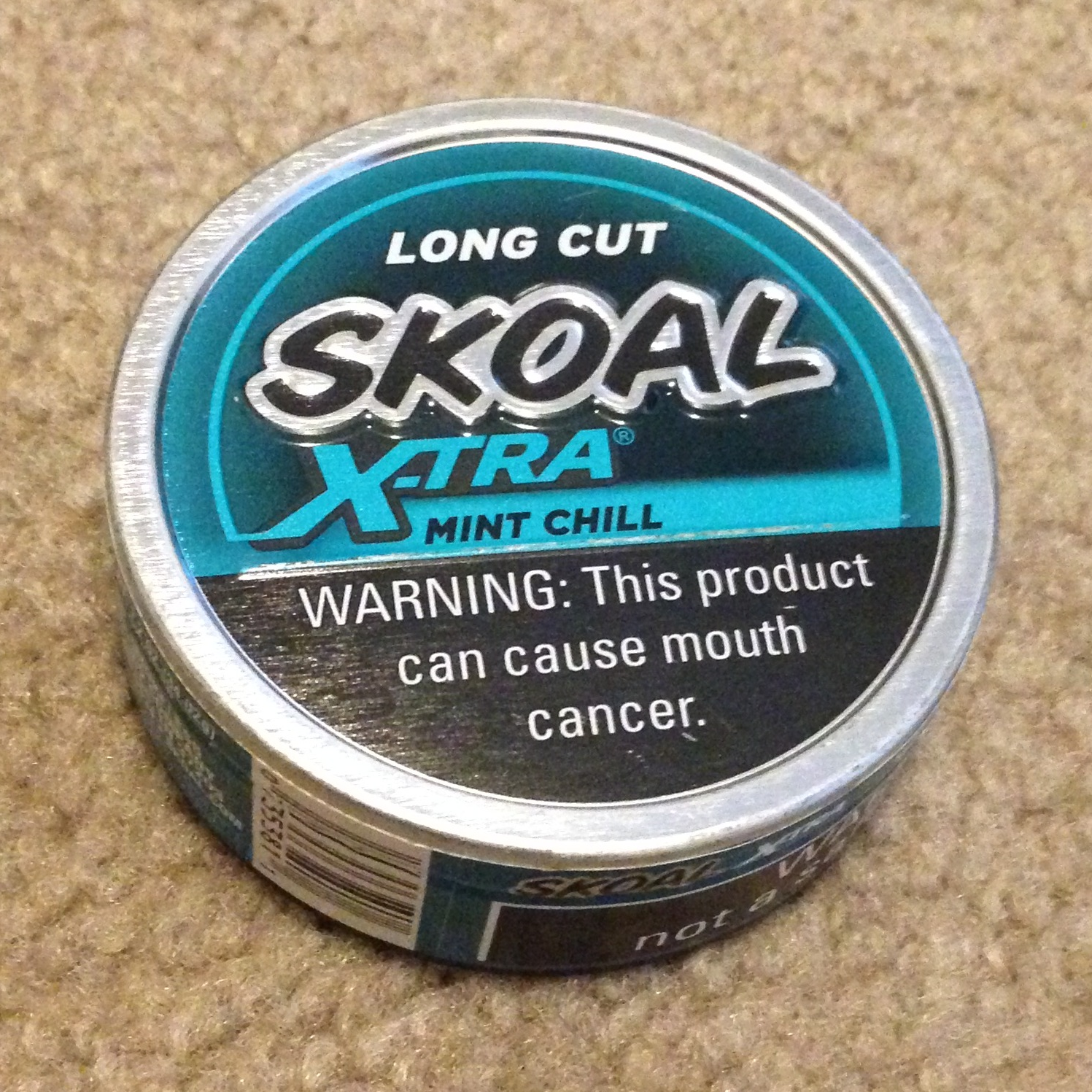
A can of Skoal X-TRA Mint Chill moist snuff, now discontinued.

Skoal is packaged in a 1.2 oz plastic can with a metal lid and is available in three textures: fine cut, long cut and two different pouch sizes. Fine cut is more grain-like, while long cut is more string-like. Two pouch varieties of Skoal are also available, Bandits, which are small pouches, and standard size pouches. The tobacco is sealed in a teabag-like pouch, eliminating the problem of tobacco spreading through the mouth. They are also easier to remove, since the tobacco stays in the pouch throughout use. Skoal Bandits are smaller, 1 gram pouches. To compensate for the smaller portion of Bandits, tins of them contain 20 pouches, instead of the standard 15.

Skoal Original Fine Cut Wintergreen was originally sold in a fiberboard can with tin lid, just like Copenhagen, and was packaged in the plastic can with a tin lid. Skoal Long Cut has always been sold in a plastic can, and originally had a plastic lid as well.

The product originally produced was only available in wintergreen flavor, but other flavors have been made available:

- Skoal Original Fine Cut Wintergreen
- Skoal Bandits Mint
- Skoal Bandits Wintergreen
- Skoal Long Cut Wintergreen
- Skoal Long Cut Straight
- Skoal Long Cut Mint
- Skoal Long Cut Classic
- Skoal Long Cut Cherry
- Skoal Long Cut Spearmint
- Skoal Long Cut Apple Blend
- Skoal Long Cut Berry Blend
- Skoal Long Cut Citrus Blend
- Skoal Long Cut Peach Blend
- Skoal Pouches Mint
- Skoal Pouches Straight
- Skoal Pouches Wintergreen
- Skoal Pouches Apple
- Skoal Pouches Citrus
- Skoal Pouches Berry
- Skoal Snus Mint
- Skoal Snus Smooth Mint
- Skoal X-tra Crisp Blend Long Cut/Pouches
- Skoal X-tra Mint Long Cut/Pouches
- Skoal X-tra Rich Blend Long Cut/Pouches
- Skoal X-tra Wintergreen Long Cut/Pouches

Skoal X-tra was introduced in 2011 and has a bolder flavor and slightly more nicotine than regular Skoal. Skoal X-tra Crisp Blend and Rich Blend are two regular Skoal flavors fused together. Crisp Blend is a combination of Apple and Citrus, while Rich Blend is a combination of Cherry and Berry.

Skoal ReadyCut was introduced in late 2012. It is 15 pre-formed cubes of long cut tobacco which eliminate the need for packing the tin and are more convenient than traditional long cut. As of 2015, it had largely been removed from most markets, with showings only in a few states and online.

When Skoal Long Cut was introduced, the original four flavors were:

- Wintergreen
- Mint (introduced in 1985)
- Straight
- Classic

In 1993, two new flavors added to the line-up:

- Cherry
- Spearmint

Many more flavors and varieties were subsequently added.

=== Discontinued ===
- Skoal Peach Pouches
- Skoal Dry Cinnamon Pouches
- Skoal Dry Menthol Pouches
- Skoal Dry Caffeine Pouches
- Skoal Fine Cut Straight
- Skoal Key
- Skoal Long Cut Edge Wintergreen
- Skoal Long Cut Frost
- Skoal Long Cut Vanilla Blend
- Skoal Snus Cinnamon
- Skoal Snus Citrus Blend
- Skoal Bandits Straight
- Skoal Bandits Classic
- Skoal Long Cut Select Blend (was available in Ohio)
- Skoal ReadyCut Mint
- Skoal ReadyCut Straight
- Skoal ReadyCut Wintergreen
- Skoal X-tra Mint Chill Long Cut and Pouches

== History ==
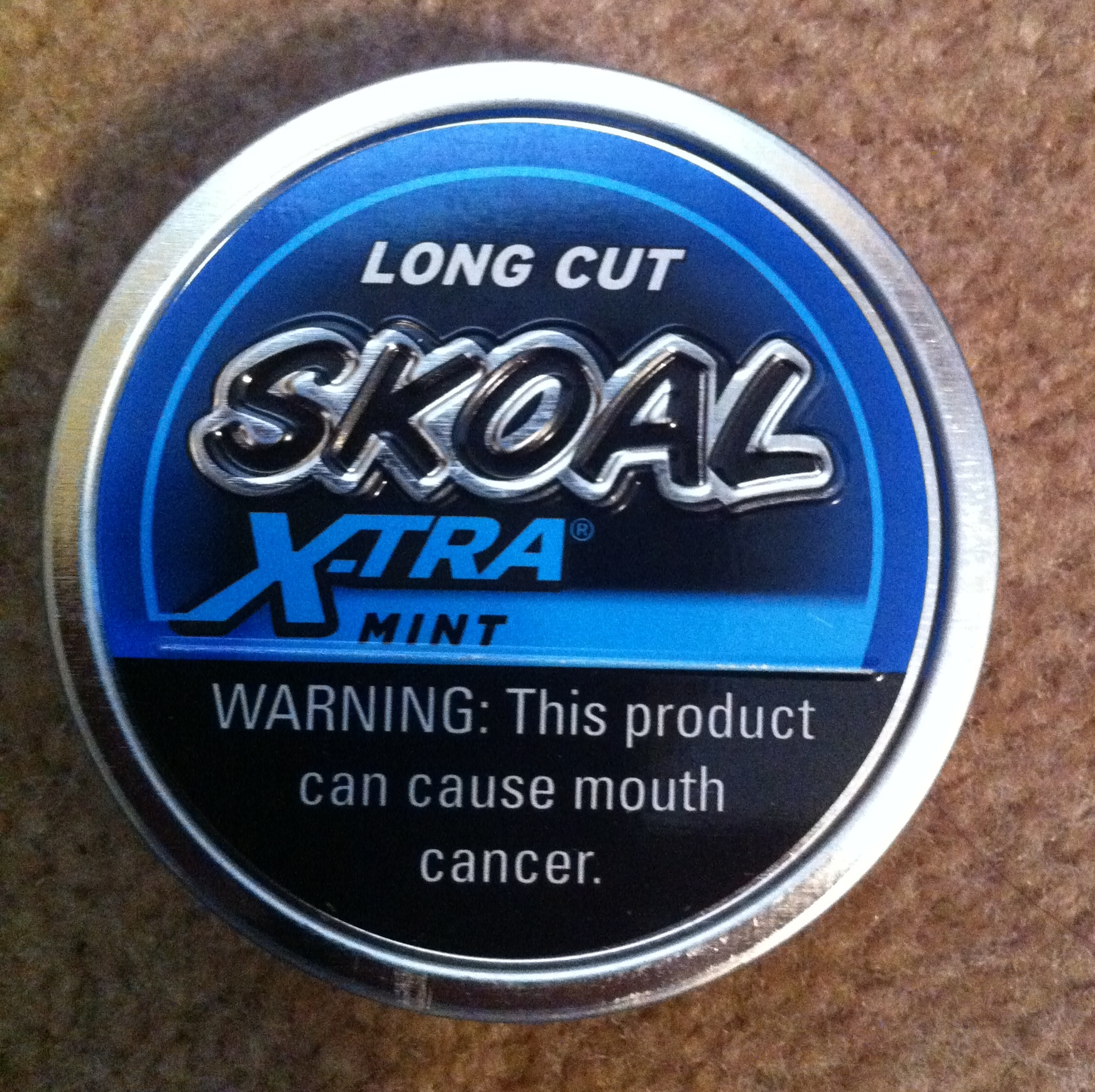
A redesigned tin of Skoal X-TRA Long Cut Mint Blend.

- 1934: Skoal was introduced as a wintergreen-flavored smokeless tobacco.
- 1983: Skoal Bandits were released.
- 1984: Skoal Long Cut was released nationwide. It was introduced in four flavors: Wintergreen, Mint, Straight and Classic.
- 1989: Skoal Bandits were introduced to the UK, but banned by the government shortly afterwards amid widespread health concerns
- 2002: Skoal Berry Blend is introduced.
- 2003: Skoal Vanilla Blend is introduced. (Discontinued in 2011)
- 2004: Skoal Apple Blend is introduced.
- 2007: Skoal Citrus Blend is introduced.
- 2008: Skoal Edge, a bolder and cooler version of Skoal Long Cut Wintergreen, is introduced. (Discontinued in 2011)
- 2010: Skoal pouches were released.
- 2011: Skoal Snus was released.
- 2011: Skoal Xtra was released in pouches and longcut.
- Early 2012: Skoal ReadyCut was released in a limited area. (Indiana, Florida, Kentucky and Virginia only)
- Late 2012: Skoal ReadyCut was available across the United States.
- 2013: Skoal Xtra Mint Chill was released for trial in selected areas (Texas, South Carolina and Virginia only)
- 2013: Skoal ReadyCut discontinued.
- Late 2015: Skoal Xtra Mint Chill discontinued
- Mid-2016: Re-introduction of Skoal Apple, Berry, and Citrus pouches

== Popularity ==
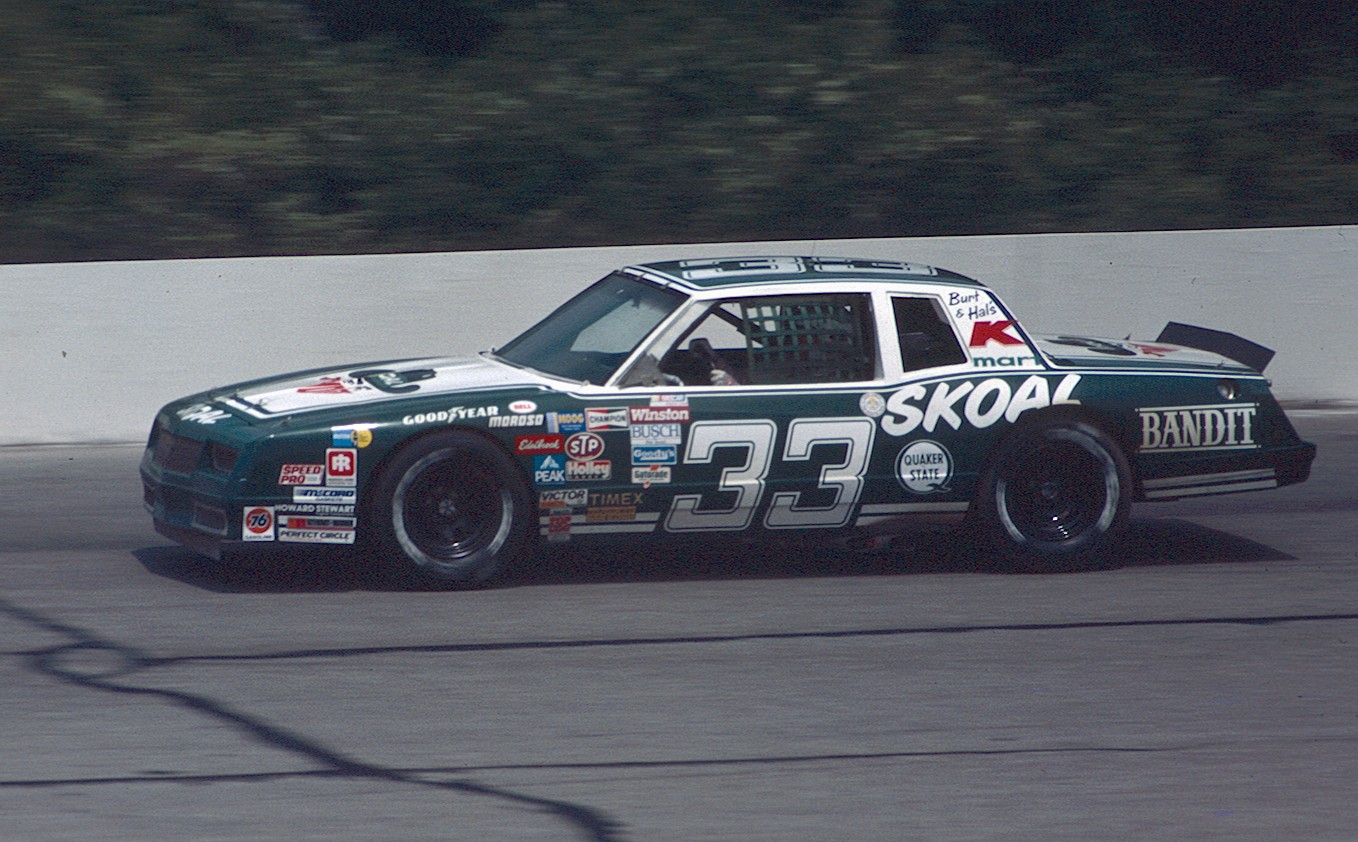
Harry Gant in the #33 Skoal Bandit Chevrolet in NASCAR

IRI info scan data for 2012 indicated that Skoal tobacco held a 22.5% share of the US smokeless tobacco market. There have been several songs written about Skoal or containing references to Skoal such as "Letter to Me" by Brad Paisley, "The Grundy County Spitting Incident" by Cledus T. Judd, "Guys Like Me" by Eric Church, "Beers Ago" by Toby Keith, "Ain't That Some" by Morgan Wallen, and "Fancy Like" and "AA" by Walker Hayes. The term "Skoal Ring" refers to the circular mark left on a back pocket of a pair of blue jeans from keeping a can of chewing tobacco in it.

== ReadyCut controversy ==
In late 2012, Skoal introduced their "ReadyCut" line. ReadyCut was essentially the same as their previous tobacco offerings, with the primary difference being in the way in which it was presented in the can. As opposed to pouches, or loose tobacco, ReadyCut was pressed into small bricks roughly one inch long, and half an inch square. The premise behind this was that a user could get their average "pinch" without the need to pack the can, or spend too much time digging the tobacco out. Furthermore, there would be less tobacco dropped, making the ReadyCut bricks cleaner. Shortly after its introduction, however, many users began to complain that the number of bricks in the can did not equate the same amount of tobacco which the company claimed was packaged. (Most cans have roughly one ounce of loose tobacco in them, while the average number of pouches per can is in the 15 to 20 range.) Users noted that if the bricks were broken apart and pressed around to form the usual loose tobacco, the can itself seemed half full; thus being less than the advertised one and two tenths of an ounce. As a result of this, and the perceived stigma associated with pouch use by regular users, ReadyCut sales quickly dwindled, to a point that by the end of 2013, Skoal had largely pulled ReadyCut from the market.
