= Dipping tobacco =

Finely ground smokeless tobacco product

Dipping tobacco

Dipping tobacco is a type of finely ground or shredded, moistened smokeless tobacco product. It is commonly and idiomatically known as dip. Dipping tobacco is used by placing a pinch, or "dip", of tobacco between the lip and the gum (sublabial administration). The act of using it is called dipping. Dipping tobacco is colloquially called snus, chaw, snuff, rub, or fresh leaf, among other terms; because of this, it is sometimes confused with other tobacco products, namely dry snuff.

Using dipping tobacco can cause various harmful effects such as oral, oesophageal, and pancreatic cancers, coronary heart disease, as well as negative reproductive effects including stillbirth, premature birth and low birth weight. Dipping tobacco poses a lower health risk than traditional combusted products, however, it is not a healthy alternative to cigarette smoking. The level of risk varies between different types of products and producing regions. There is no safe level of dipping tobacco use. Globally it contributes to 650,000 deaths each year.

== Description ==
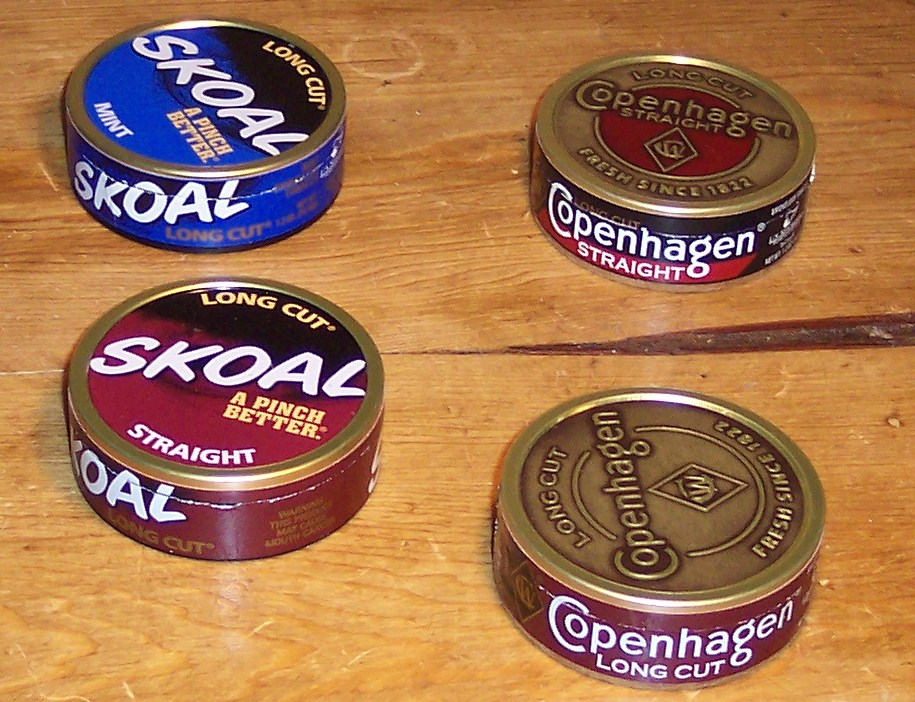
Four different cans (or tins) of dipping tobacco (from bottom left, clockwise): Skoal straight, Skoal long cut mint, Copenhagen straight, and Copenhagen long cut.

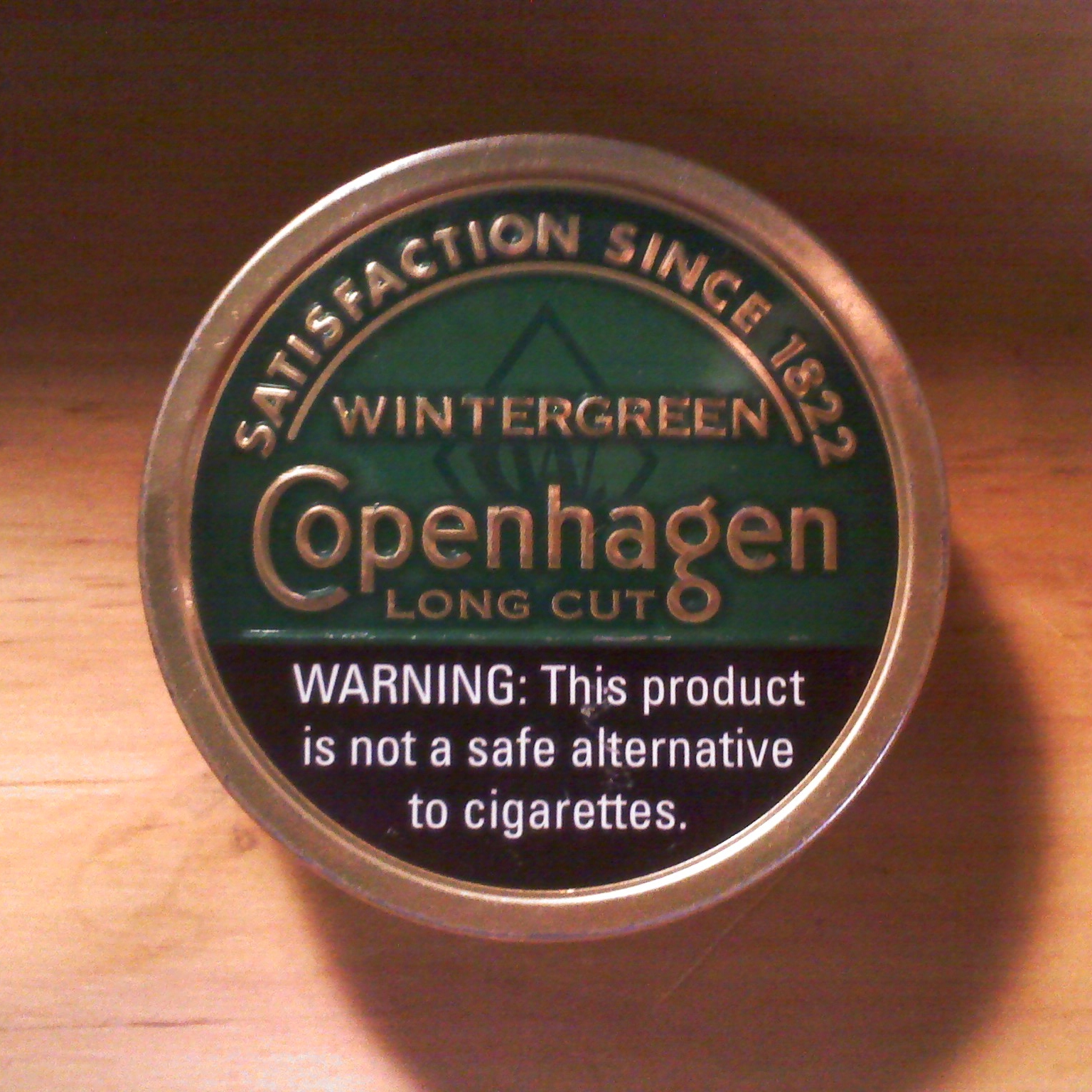
A can of Copenhagen brand American dipping tobacco

Dipping tobacco is packaged in "tins" or "cans", although they are not typically completely metal anymore. Dipping tobacco is also available in "rolls", "logs", or "sleeves", which is a package of 5 tins of tobacco, a similar concept to that of a carton of cigarettes. Ten tin rolls were also available in the past. Another package of dipping tobacco is the "tub", available in only select brands, equivalent to 6, 10, or 12 cans.

Before opening the can/tin of tobacco, users typically "pack" the can, similar to how cigarette smokers pack a pack of cigarettes. This is done by placing one's thumb and middle finger on the sides of the can, and then quickly turning the can and flicking the wrist so that one's index finger taps the top of the can.

Unlike snus, which is most often placed between the upper lip and gum, moist tobacco users or "dippers" tend to use the lower. Dipping in the upper lip is unusual, though when done, it is colloquially termed an "upper decker" or "top lip dip". The dip rests on the inside lining of the mouth for a period depending upon the user's preference—often 20–40 minutes. Nicotine and other alkaloids found in tobacco are absorbed in saliva sublabially by the inferior or superior labial arteries. Buccal and sublingual absorption may also occur.

Also unlike snus, dip often causes the user to produce excess saliva during the act of dipping. This is typically spat onto the ground or in a container, called a "spitter," because swallowing the saliva-tobacco mixture can cause irritation to the esophagus and induce nausea and vomiting. A spittoon can be used, but often users will simply use an empty plastic bottle or a "mudjug," a portable spittoon. Smokeless tobacco is sometimes used in the workplace by employees, especially if the employer does not provide many cigarette breaks or if the employee is consistently using both hands during work (which doesn't provide opportunities for cigarette smoking). Smokeless tobacco is popular in many industrial areas where there is a safety risk in having an open flame, such as oil rigs or refineries.

== Etymology and terminology ==
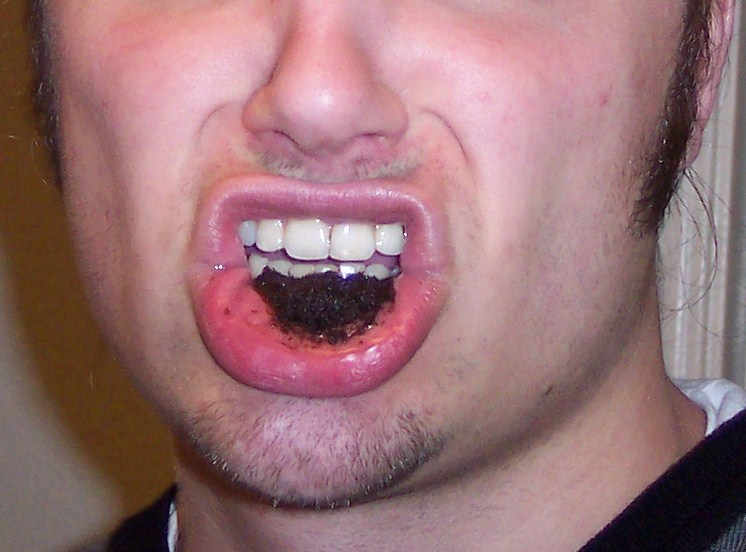
An example of how dipping tobacco is often placed in the mouth

Dipping tobacco was first popularized and marketed as moist snuff in the 1800s. The term "snuff" in this context is an English cognate of the aforementioned "snus", from Swedish.Dipping tobacco's Scandinavian roots impart a noticeable legacy on modern American brands such as Copenhagen and Skoal (referring to the interlinguistic term skål, which in Danish, Norwegian, Icelandic, Faroese and Swedish roughly translates to "cheers", implying a toast).

Dipping tobacco use is often accompanied by first drinking a liquid, in some areas known as a primer, catalyst, and rinser. A primer is used to initially salivate the mouth, usually during a meal, in order to prepare the mouth to use smokeless tobacco. This is important because a dry mouth or one full of food could lead to a less enjoyable experience for the user. A catalyst, like a primer, is used to fix the issues of a dry mouth or dry tobacco; however, the dipping tobacco is already currently in the user's lip. A rinser is used when the user is finished with their tobacco, and it is swished around in the user's mouth, similar to mouthwash, to dispose of any excess tobacco juice or particulates. All three liquids are usually water, but any liquid may be used.

Primarily in Texas and other southern US states, terminology is unique. Dip or dips refers to a wad of tobacco, whereas snuff refers to any amount of tobacco greater than a dip. For example, a tobacco user may reach for a dip from their can of snuff. Many areas have no such distinction, and may rarely use the word "snuff".

== Cut sizes ==
The difference between cut sizes is the length of the strands of dip.

=== Common cut sizes ===
- Extra Long cuts are a little longer than long cut.
- Wide cuts are long cut, just a little wider.
- Long cuts are the most widely available cut size.
- Fine cuts/snuffs are slightly larger than sand or coffee grounds.
- Pouches hold fine cut or snuff tobacco in a small, teabag-like pouch. They are initially less messy because the tobacco will not fall out of the user's fingers and mouth. Dipping tobacco in pouches resemble snus "portions", but the difference between these two products lies in the way the tobacco is processed. Dipping tobacco (including pouched products) undergoes fermentation, whereas tobacco in snus is pasteurized. In addition to regular-sized pouches, smaller-sized pouches, known as Bandits, are also available in the Skoal brand.

=== Unique cut sizes ===
The following cuts are either unique to one brand of dipping tobacco or are extremely rare:

- Fat cuts are a little longer, flatter, and softer than long cut.
- Mid cuts are comparable to small granules at about 1 mm (0.039 in) cubed. Mid cuts are extremely rare; the original version of Copenhagen Black is the only dip marketed as a mid cut that has made it to the market. However, many consider some products marketed as long cuts to be mid cuts, notably Copenhagen Long Cut Original.
- ReadyCut is a cut produced only by Skoal (introduced in 2012) which consists of a compressed cube of long cut. As it gets moist from saliva in the mouth, it automatically conforms to the user's mouth.
- Wide cut is a new cut introduced by Grizzly in select markets. It consists of wider strands than long cut. Grizzly Wide Cut Wintergreen is the only wide cut available.

== Flavoring ==
Dipping tobacco is typically flavored. The most common flavors consist of mint, wintergreen, straight, and natural.

== Health issues ==
While associated with a lower health risk than smoking, dipping tobacco is addictive, represents a major health risk, has no safe level use and is not a safe substitute for smoking. Globally it contributes to 650 000 deaths each year with a significant proportion of them in Southeast Asia.

Using dipping tobacco can cause a number of adverse health effects such as dental disease, oral cancer, oesophagus cancer, and pancreatic cancer, cardiovascular disease, asthma, and deformities in the female reproductive system. It also raises the risk of fatal coronary artery disease, fatal stroke and non-fatal ischaemic heart disease

Quitting dipping tobacco use is as challenging as smoking cessation. There is no scientific evidence that using dipping tobacco can help a person quit smoking.

=== Cancer ===
Dipping tobacco is a cause of oral cancer, oesophagus cancer, and pancreas cancer. Increased risk of oral cancer caused by dipping tobacco is present in countries such as the United States but particularly prevalent in Southeast Asian countries where the use of smokeless tobacco is common.

All tobacco products, including dipping, contain cancer-causing chemicals. These carcinogenic compounds occurring in dipping tobacco vary widely, and depend upon the kind of product and how it was manufactured. There are 28 known cancer-causing substances in dipping tobacco products.

=== Cardiovascular disease ===
Using dipping tobacco increases the risk of fatal coronary heart disease and stroke. In 2010 more than 200 000 people out of 300 000 000 smokeless tobacco users suffered from non-fatal acute myocardial infarction. Use of dipping tobacco also seems to greatly raise the risk of non-fatal ischaemic heart disease among users in Asia, although not in Europe.

=== Effects during pregnancy ===
Dipping tobacco can cause adverse reproductive effects including stillbirth, premature birth, and low birth weight. Nicotine in dipping tobacco products that are used during pregnancy can affect how a baby's brain develops before birth.

== List of brands ==
The following is a partial list of brands of dipping tobacco. Other tobacco products, such as chewing tobacco and snus, are excluded.

- America's Best Chew
- Copenhagen
- Grizzly
- Kodiak
- Skoal
- Stoker's

== Legality ==
Several countries have banned the sale (and in some cases the import) of dipping tobacco. Sale of dipping tobacco was banned in South Australia in 1986 and across the country in 1991 and in most of the EU nations in 1993. Sweden was exempt from this ban because of the traditionally high usage of snus in that country. Dipping tobacco is also not currently permitted for sale in the UK. It is not yet clear whether this law will be changed now that the UK has left the EU.

In the United States, the Family Smoking Prevention and Tobacco Control Act gives the Food and Drug Administration the power to regulate the tobacco industry. This law prohibits the sale of dipping tobacco to anyone under the age of 21, restricts tobacco product advertising and marketing directed to younger audiences, and requires bigger, more prominent warning labels for dipping tobacco products.

== Taxation ==
In the United States, the federal government taxes dipping tobacco at $0.5033 per pound ($1.11/kg), equivalent to 3.15¢ per one-ounce (28 g) package. Excise taxes are also levied at the state level (Pennsylvania being the only exception), and in some instances, at the local level. Sales tax is also applied to the full retail price of dipping tobacco in most jurisdictions. The price of a tin of tobacco can range anywhere from under $1 per tin to more than $8. Price is affected by factors such as brand and varying excise taxes from state to state.

== History ==
Dipping tobacco evolved from the use of dry snuff in early American history. Up until the late 1700s, dry snuff was taken nasally, but then early Americans would take snuff orally by chewing the end of a twig until it resembled a brush, and then "dipping" the twig in the snuff and placing it in their mouths until the snuff dissolved. Using dry snuff orally eventually evolved into modern day moist snuff, which Copenhagen introduced in 1822 and then Skoal started producing in 1934. Most varieties of dipping tobacco are much more recent inventions.

Moist snuff is available throughout the United States. Dipping tobacco is predominantly used by males. A 2021 survey on adult tobacco use in the United States found that 4.2 percent of male respondents used smokeless tobacco, compared to .2 percent for female respondents, accounting for the smallest percentage of users compared to all other tobacco products. Also, dipping tobacco has a similar presence in Canada. Smokeless tobacco use by professional baseball players was widespread throughout the 20th century until more recent years with the MLB increasing restrictions on tobacco consumption, although a 1999 survey reported that "31 percent of the league's rookies used smokeless tobacco". In the US minor leagues, dipping tobacco has been banned since the 90s. According to recent reports from NFL players, many professional football players chew tobacco in locker rooms, with some teams reporting that up to 75% of players admit to dipping.

== See also ==
- Chewing tobacco
- Herbal dipping tobacco
- Naswar
- Smoking cessation
- Snus
- Tobacco industry
- Tobacco products
