= Mokujiki Shōnin =

Japanese Buddhist monk-sculptor, poet, and calligrapher (1718–1810)

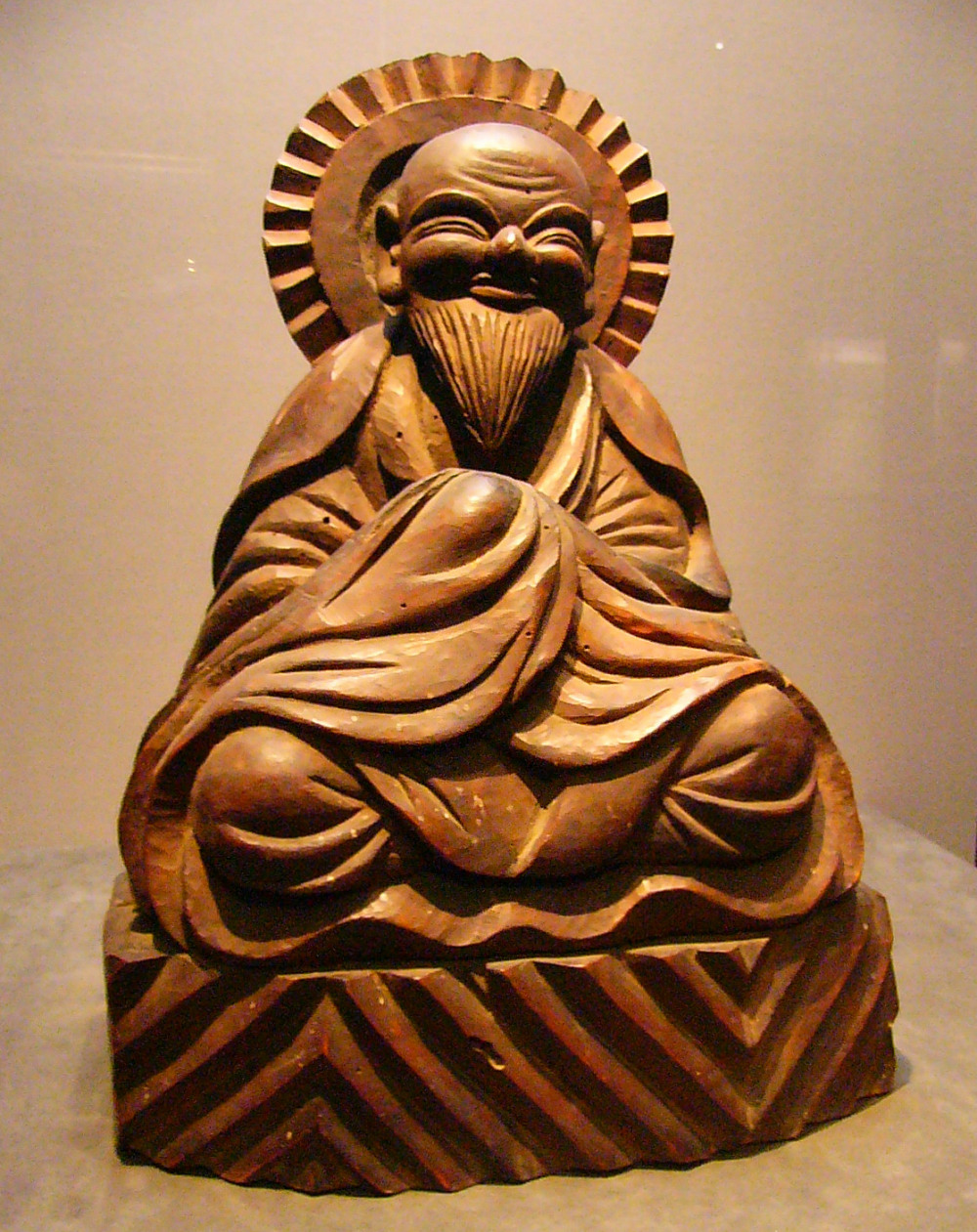
- Self-portrait of Mokujiki Shōnin, 1804 (Tokyo National Museum)
- Born: 1718; Marubatake, Koseki, Kai Province (present-day Minobu, Yamanashi, Japan)
- Died: 6 July 1810; Kai Province, Japan
- Known for: Buddhist sculpture, calligraphy, poetry
- Notable work: Bishō-butsu (Smiling Buddhas); Fudō Myōō (Metropolitan Museum of Art); Self-portrait (Tokyo National Museum)
- Movement: Late Edo-period Buddhist folk sculpture; Mingei movement

Mokujiki Shōnin (木喰上人, 1718 – 6 July 1810), also recorded as Mokujiki Gogyō Myōman (木喰五行明満), was a Japanese Buddhist monk, itinerant sculptor, calligrapher, painter, and poet of the late Edo period. Beginning in his early sixties, he carved more than a thousand wooden Buddhist statues—each inscribed on the reverse with the date of completion and his religious name—which he left at temples, shrines, and villages across Japan during four decades of nationwide pilgrimage.

His mature works are characterized by rounded forms, smiling expressions (bishō-butsu, 微笑仏), and the deliberate retention of chisel marks on unvarnished single-block wood. This late style—most fully developed after age eighty—is regularly contrasted with the vigorous, angular carving of the earlier itinerant monk-sculptor Enkū (1632–1695), with whom Mokujiki is habitually paired in Japanese art scholarship and exhibition.

Largely forgotten after his death, his works were rediscovered in the early 1920s by the philosopher and art critic Yanagi Sōetsu, whose research directly inspired the coinage of the term mingei (民藝, "people's craft") in 1925 and the subsequent Mingei movement.

== Biography ==
=== Early life and ordination ===
Mokujiki was born in 1718 in Marubatake, Koseki, Kai Province (today Minobu, Yamanashi), the second son of the village head of the Itō family. At the age of fourteen (1731) he left home without permission for Edo. After years of secular life in the capital, he was ordained at age twenty-one (1739) at Ōyama Fudō (Daizan-ji), a Shingon temple in Sagami Province.

=== The mokujiki-kai vow ===
In 1762, at the age of forty-four, Mokujiki formally adopted the mokujiki-kai (木食戒) precepts at Rakan-ji in Mito, receiving them under the monk Mokujiki Kankai. This vow required lifelong abstinence from the five grains, cooked food, salt, and fish; subsistence consisted solely of wild plants, tree nuts, and mountain herbs. The name mokujiki (literally "eating wood") derives from this practice, which has roots in Chinese Taoist grain-avoidance and was incorporated into Japanese Shugendō and Shingon esotericism. Mokujiki maintained the vow unbroken until his death. After receiving it, he adopted the religious name "Mokujiki"; over his lifetime he also used variant names such as Mokujiki Gogyō and Mokujiki Myōman in his inscriptions.

=== Pilgrimage and sculptural vocation ===
In 1773 (age fifty-six), Mokujiki undertook a nationwide pilgrimage (kaikoku) to visit all the provincial temples (kokubunji) of Japan, traveling on foot and often accompanied by his disciple Mokujiki Hakudō. He traversed the country from Kyūshū in the south to southern Hokkaido in the north, a circuit estimated at some 20,000 kilometres. Around 1778, at age sixty-one, he arrived in Hokkaido and—upon encountering sculptures attributed to Enkū at Kumaishi—began carving Buddhist images. His earliest securely dated surviving work is a standing Jizō Bosatsu at Hōzōji in present-day Yakumo, Hokkaido, inscribed on the reverse with the completion date of 24 April 1780 (Anei 9); it measures 206 cm and is designated a Hokkaido tangible cultural property.

Between 1781 and 1785, Mokujiki was active on Sado Island, producing numerous statues and calligraphic scrolls. He later resided at Hyūga Kokubun-ji in Kyūshū.

Mokujiki vowed to carve one thousand Buddha images (sentaibutsu, 千体仏); by age eighty he had fulfilled this vow, after which he extended his ambition to two thousand. On the reverse of each statue he inscribed in black ink the date of completion, his religious name, and the statue's sequential number within his vow.

In 1800 (age eighty-three), Mokujiki resided for nearly two months in the Fujieda and Yaizu districts of Shizuoka, producing thirteen statues and eight works of calligraphy and painting while traveling between temples from Okabe-juku to Mt. Takakusayama. Between 1801 and 1802 he returned to his birthplace of Marubatake to complete the Shikokudō complex, carving approximately ninety images modeled on the eighty-eight temples of the Shikoku Pilgrimage, including a self-portrait and related devotional figures. In 1807 (age eighty-nine), while visiting Inagawa-chō in Hyogo Province, he carved twenty-six statues in rapid succession; one work from this visit, the Tachiki Koyasu Kannon (1807), was carved directly into the trunk of a living oak tree within the precincts of Enmanji temple, and was preserved inside the hall after the tree was struck by lightning in the Meiji era.

Mokujiki died on 6 July 1810 (Bunka 7, 5th day of the 6th month in the lunar calendar), aged ninety-three, in Kai Province. (Note: The lunar date (Bunka 7/6/5) corresponds to 6 July 1810 in the Gregorian calendar.)

== Chronology ==
Year	Age	Event
1718	0	Born in Marubatake, Koseki, Kai Province.
1731	14	Leaves home for Edo.
1739	21	Ordained at Ōyama Fudō (Daizan-ji), Sagami Province.
1762	44	Receives the mokujiki-kai precepts at Rakan-ji, Mito; adopts the religious name "Mokujiki".
1773	56	Begins nationwide kaikoku pilgrimage.
c. 1778	61	Arrives in Hokkaido; encounters works attributed to Enkū at Kumaishi; begins carving Buddhist statues.
1780	63	Earliest securely dated surviving work: standing Jizō Bosatsu at Hōzōji, Yakumo, Hokkaido (24 April; 206 cm; Hokkaido designated cultural property).
1781–1785	63–67	Active on Sado Island; produces statues and calligraphic scrolls.
c. 1780s	—	Extended encounter with works by Enkū; decisive influence on sculptural style.
c. 1790s	—	Resides at Hyūga Kokubun-ji, Kyūshū.
1800	83	Stays nearly two months in Fujieda and Yaizu (Shizuoka); produces 13 statues and 8 calligraphic/painting works.
1801–1802	83–84	Completes the Shikokudō complex (~90 images) in Marubatake.
1804	86–87	Creates self-portrait (Tokyo National Museum, inv. C-1825), donated by Masaichirō Yoshizawa.
1805	87–88	Carves Fudō Myōō (Metropolitan Museum of Art, 2016.363.1) and calligraphic scroll Sacred Names of Shinto Deities (Metropolitan Museum of Art, 2016.364).
1807	89–90	Visits Inagawa-chō (Hyogo); carves 26 statues, including the Tachiki Koyasu Kannon in a living tree. Carves Tamatsushima Daimyōjin (Kawai Kanjirō's House, Kyoto).
1810	93	Dies in Kai Province on 6 July.

== Sculptural work and style ==
=== Technique ===
Mokujiki carved from a single block of wood (ichiboku-zukuri, 一木造り), without hollowing, lacquering, or painting, leaving the surfaces with visible marks from round-headed chisels. His approach is often described by the term natabori (鉈彫り, "hatchet-carved"), though the Metropolitan Museum of Art notes that he used round-headed chisels rather than a true hatchet. Japanese art scholarship emphasizes the deliberate retention of tool traces and bold simplification as expressive qualities that later critics compared to aspects of modern sculpture.

=== The smiling Buddhas (bishō-butsu) ===
The principal innovation of Mokujiki's mature work is the bishō-butsu (微笑仏, "smiling Buddha"). Scholars note that his distinctive smiling faces first appear consistently around age eighty and deepen in quality after ninety. In contrast to the formal solemnity conventional in Japanese Buddhist sculpture, his figures—including subjects such as Fudō Myōō (Acala) and Bishamonten (Vaiśravaṇa), both traditionally depicted as fierce or formidable—display rounded, warmly benevolent expressions. The statues were sufficiently approachable in feeling that local populations reportedly allowed children to use them as playthings.

Mokujiki articulated this aspiration in verse; his smiling faces began appearing after age eighty, deepening alongside a body of waka poetry that returns obsessively to the theme of roundness as a spiritual state.

=== Poetry (waka) ===
Mokujiki left behind a collection of waka poetry, preserved in notebooks discovered in his native village by Yanagi Sōetsu. Yanagi described him as a poet for whom "the syllable A alone cannot be contained in one or two verses." His poems return repeatedly to the image of the circle (maru, 丸) as a symbol of spiritual completeness, and to the ajikan (阿字観) meditative practice of Shingon Buddhism, in which the Sanskrit syllable A represents the primordial ground of all phenomena.

The most celebrated poem, quoted by Yanagi and widely reprinted, expresses the aspiration to inner roundness:

まるまると まるめ まるめよ わが心 まん丸丸く 丸くまん丸

Marumaru to / marume marumeyo / waga kokoro / manmaru maruku / maruku manmaru

"Round and round, make it round—my heart: perfectly round, round, and perfectly round."

Other extant waka on the theme of roundness include:

るりの玉 みればみるほど まん丸に おれが心も にたりやつたり

Ruri no tama / mireba miru hodo / manmaru ni / ore ga kokoro mo / nitari yattari

"The lapis jewel — the more I look at it, the more perfectly round it becomes; my heart has come to resemble it too."

みな人の 心をまるく まん丸に どこもかしこも まるく まん丸

Mina hito no / kokoro wo maruku / manmaru ni / doko mo kashiko mo / maruku manmaru

"Everyone's hearts — round, perfectly round; everywhere and in every way, round, perfectly round."

唯心 まん丸に いつもすずしき 十五夜の月

Yuishin / manmaru ni / itsumo suzushiki / jūgoya no tsuki

"Mind-only — perfectly round, always cool: the full moon of the fifteenth night."

嵐たち うしほのくもを ふきはらひ あらはれ出る 月の丸さよ

Arashi tachi / ushio no kumo wo / fukiharai / araharede ru / tsuki no marusa yo

"The storm rises and blows away the ocean-tide clouds; how round the moon that now appears."

Alongside these, he left poems showing an irreverent humour that alluded to his independence from sectarian orthodoxy:

念仏に こゑをからせどおとなし みだとしやかとは ひるねなりけり

Nenbutsu ni / koe wo karasedo / otonashi / Mida to Shaka to wa / hirune narikeri

"Chanting the nembutsu until my voice grows hoarse — how quiet; Amida and Śākyamuni are taking an afternoon nap."

ざぜんして ものをいはかあほうもの 己の心 みつけざりけり

Zazen shite / mono wo iwa ka ahōmono / onore no kokoro / mitsuke zarikeri

"Sitting in zazen without speaking — you fool! You still haven't found your own heart."

=== Comparison with Enkū ===
Mokujiki is regularly paired with Enkū (1632–1695), his predecessor among Edo-period itinerant monk-sculptors. Although both practiced single-block wood carving outside professional workshops, their approaches differ markedly:

Characteristic	Enkū (1632–1695)	Mokujiki Shōnin (1718–1810)
Province of origin	Mino (Gifu)	Kai (Yamanashi)
Primary region of activity	Hokkaido and central Honshu	Nationwide, Hokkaido to Kyūshū
Sculptural style	Rapid angular cuts; geometric, vigorous forms	Compact, spherical forms (bishō-butsu)
Primary tool	Adze or billhook with straight chisels	Round-headed chisels
Expressive register	Dynamic, sometimes severe spirituality	Deep joy, warmth, serenity
Surface treatment	Rough, rustic; projecting splinters	Undulating, continuous chisel marks
Estimated output	c. 120,000 images (traditional claim)	Over 1,000 documented; c. 626 extant

=== Calligraphy and painting ===
In addition to sculpture, Mokujiki produced calligraphic hanging scrolls and painted devotional works. The Metropolitan Museum of Art holds two works acquired in 2016 dated to 1805: the Fudō Myōō sculpture and a calligraphic hanging scroll inscribed with the sacred names of Shinto deities and the "Oracles of the Three Shrines" (Sansha takusen), a devotional object for those unable to travel to the great Shinto shrines of Ise, Iwashimizu Hachimangū, and Kasuga. The Met notes that his brush-writing "exhibits the same energy and heartfelt piety that appear in his sculptural works."

=== Self-portraits ===
Mokujiki produced an unusually large number of sculptural self-portraits (Mokujiki Jishinzō, 木喰自身像), a practice rare in Japanese sculpture. His most celebrated self-portrait, dated to Kyōwa 4 (1804), was carved at the age of eighty-six to eighty-seven and donated by Masaichirō Yoshizawa to the Tokyo National Museum (inventory C-1825).

== Works and cataloguing ==
Scholarly compilations estimate approximately 700 or more works attributed to Mokujiki, of which over 600 are extant. A 2007 catalogue counted 617 extant, 56 of unknown location, and 31 destroyed by fire (total 710). A 2015 exhibition tally reported 626 extant, plus 95 missing, relocated, or lost examples (total 721).

=== Geographic distribution ===
The largest concentration of surviving works is in Niigata Prefecture, reflecting his extended residence on Sado Island. Distribution by prefecture according to the 2015 tally:

Prefecture	Extant works (2015)
Niigata	282
Yamanashi	89
Shizuoka	60
Yamaguchi	55
Other prefectures	140
Total (extant)	626

=== Selected works ===
Work	Subject	Date	Medium	Location
Jizō Bosatsu (standing)	Kṣitigarbha	24 April 1780	Cypress wood; H. 206 cm	Hōzōji, Yakumo, Hokkaido (Hokkaido designated cultural property)
Jundei Kannon Bosatsu	Cundi-Avalokiteśvara	1800	Wood	Kōtaiji Temple, Okabe-chō, Fujieda, Shizuoka
Shōtoku Taishi	Prince Shōtoku	1800	Wood	Kōtaiji Temple, Okabe-chō, Fujieda, Shizuoka
Kokūzō Bosatsu	Ākāśagarbha Bodhisattva	1800	Wood	Jurinji Temple, Okabe-chō, Fujieda, Shizuoka
Koyasu Jizō Bosatsu	Child-protecting Kṣitigarbha	1800	Wood	Jurinji Temple, Okabe-chō, Fujieda, Shizuoka
Bishamonten	Vaiśravaṇa	1800	Wood	Jōrakuin Temple, Fujieda, Shizuoka
Koyasu Kannon Bosatsu	Child-giving Avalokiteśvara	1800	Wood	Bairin'in Temple, Okabe-chō, Fujieda, Shizuoka
Yakushi Nyorai	Medicine Buddha	1800	Wood	Bairin'in Temple, Okabe-chō, Fujieda, Shizuoka
Jizō Bosatsu	Kṣitigarbha	1800	Wood	Hōshakuji Temple, Yaizu, Shizuoka
Mokujiki Jishinzō (Self-portrait)	Portrait of the artist	1804	Wood	Tokyo National Museum, Tokyo (inv. C-1825)
Fudō Myōō (Achala Vidyārāja)	Acala	1805	Chisel-carved wood; H. 90 cm, W. 37 cm, D. 25 cm	Metropolitan Museum of Art, New York (2016.363.1)
Sacred Names of Shinto Deities and the Oracles of the Three Shrines	Calligraphy	1805	Hanging scroll; ink on paper; image 80 × 20.7 cm	Metropolitan Museum of Art, New York (2016.364)
Tachiki Koyasu Kannon	Child-giving Avalokiteśvara	1807	Living oak tree (in situ); preserved in temple hall	Enmanji Temple, Inagawa-chō, Hyogo
Tamatsushima Daimyōjin	Shinto kami	1807	Wood; H. 49 cm	Kawai Kanjirō's House, Kyoto

The iconographic repertoire of Mokujiki's sculpture spans Amida Nyorai (Amitābha), Jizō Bosatsu (Kṣitigarbha), various forms of Kannon (Avalokiteśvara), Fudō Myōō (Acala), Bishamonten (Vaiśravaṇa), Kōbō Daishi, and Prince Shōtoku, as well as Shinto deities (kami).

== Rediscovery and the Mingei movement ==
In early 1924, Yanagi Sōetsu (1889–1961), accompanied by the scholar Asakawa Takumi, visited the collector Komiyama Seizō in Yamanashi and encountered a wooden Kokūzō Bosatsu carved by Mokujiki. The encounter prompted Yanagi to formulate his concept of "beauty of health" (健康の美, kenkō no bi)—the spontaneous, egoless creativity he identified as the aesthetic ideal of folk craftspeople working in a state of mushin (無心, "no-mind"). He published his findings in 1925 as a seven-volume study, and local newspapers began describing the growing enthusiasm as Mokujiki fever (木喰ブーム).

The research into Mokujiki directly provided the conceptual foundation for Yanagi, together with potters Kawai Kanjirō and Hamada Shōji, to coin the term mingei in late 1925. The movement, which championed the beauty of anonymous handcraft over academic art, found in Mokujiki's unpretentious, devotional sculptures its most compelling historical precedent. The Japan Folk Crafts Museum (Mingeikan), founded in Tokyo in 1936 with Yanagi as its first director, holds significant collections related to the movement.

== Major exhibitions ==
Exhibition	Year(s)	Venue	Notes
Mokujiki no Bishōbutsu	1997–1998	Shōtō Museum of Art, Shibuya, Tokyo	c. 130 works drawn from Niigata, Shizuoka, Kyoto, Hyogo, and Yamaguchi; record attendance and catalogue sales for the museum
The Smile in Japanese Art	2007	Mori Art Museum, Tokyo	Included Tamatsushima Daimyōjin (1807); art direction won the Tokyo Art Directors Club Prize
Bimusubi no Hotoke-tachi: Mokujiki-ten (290th birth anniversary)	2007–2008	Fukuoka City Museum	Organized with Mainichi Shimbun, NHK Fukuoka, and the National Mokujiki Research Society (全国木喰研究会)
Enkū and Mokujiki: Prayers in Smiles	2015	Sogo & Seibu galleries (multiple venues)	c. 250 sculptures and calligraphic works by both monks
The 100th Anniversary of Mingei: Kyoto's Legacy of Everyday Life	13 Sept – 7 Dec 2025	Kyoto City KYOCERA Museum of Art	Centenary of the coinage of mingei; opens with Mokujiki's wood-carved statues as the origin point of the movement; organised by City of Kyoto, NHK, and Mainichi Newspapers

== Legacy ==
Mokujiki is recognized, alongside Enkū, as one of the most significant itinerant monk-sculptors of the Edo period. His sculpture is preserved in temples, public museums, and private collections throughout Japan. Internationally, the Metropolitan Museum of Art holds three works acquired in 2016—a sculpture and two calligraphic scrolls, all dated 1805—in its Asian Art collection.

The Minobu-cho Mokujiki no Sato Bishōkan (身延町木喰の里微笑館), located in his birthplace of Marubatake in Minobu, holds archival documents including the autobiographical text Shikokudō Shingan-kyō, a poetry collection, and photographic panels documenting Mokujiki statues from across Japan.

Mokujiki's work has been associated with the Buddhist ideal attributed to Saichō (767–822): ichigu wo terasu (一隅を照らす, "to illuminate one corner"), interpreted as the aspiration to bring compassionate attention to the ordinary and overlooked—an affinity noted by scholars connecting his rough, affectionate carvings to a tradition of grassroots Buddhist devotion outside official institutions.

== See also ==
- Enkū
- Mingei
- Yanagi Sōetsu
- Mokujiki (ascetic practice)
- Shikoku Pilgrimage
- Japanese Buddhist sculpture
