= Kuber (disambiguation) =

Kuber may refer to:

- Kuber, a 7th century Bulgar leader
- Kuber (tobacco), a smokeless tobacco product popular in East Africa
- Kuber Peak, a mountain in the Antarctic
- Kubera or Kuber, the Hindu god of wealth
- Kuber Dindor, an Indian politician
- Kuber Nath Rai (1933–1996), an Indian writer and scholar

== See also ==
- Kubera (disambiguation)
