= Dissolvable tobacco =

Type of smokeless tobacco product

Dissolvable tobacco is a smokeless tobacco product that dissolves in the mouth. FDA describes dissolvable tobacco products to be lozenges, oral-use strips, or sticks (some of which may look like hard candy), and they dissolve in the mouth without requiring spitting or discarding of the product. Major tobacco manufacturers that sell dissolvable tobacco products include R. J. Reynolds Tobacco Company. Research into health effects of dissolvable and other new tobacco products was among the reasons of the establishment of the Tobacco Products Scientific Advisory Committee of the Food and Drug Administration in 2009.

== Camel Dissolvables ==
Camel Dissolvables were manufactured by R.J. Reynolds from 2009-2013 for the US market. The Camel Dissolvables line includes Camel Orbs, Camel Strips, and Camel Sticks, and were marketed as "a convenient alternative to cigarettes, and moist snuff for adult tobacco consumers." Reynolds said that the products "will not be positioned as a smoking cessation or reduced risk product".

On May 12, 2020, the U.S. Food and Drug Administration (FDA) issued Not Substantially Equivalent (NSE) orders for three Camel Dissolvables products (Camel Sticks Mint, Camel Strips Mint, and Camel Orbs Mint), determining they were not substantially similar enough to the originally approved products and therefore could not be legally marketed under the standard marketing pathway.

=== Ingredients ===
Camel Orbs contained finely grained tobacco mixed with "additives such as water, flavorants, binders, colorants, pH adjusters, buffering agents, fillers, disintegration aids, humectants, antioxidants, oral care ingredients, preservatives, additives derived from herbal or botanical sources, and mixtures thereof." Each pellet contained 1 milligram of nicotine, dissolving in the mouth in 10–15 minutes. Camel Sticks product was a twisted stick the size of a toothpick that lasts in the mouth about 20–30 minutes, and contains 3.1 milligrams of nicotine. Camel Sticks were designed for insertion between the upper lip and gum. Camel Strips contained 0.6 milligrams of nicotine per strip. Camel Strips last 2–3 minutes on the tongue, administering nicotine through thin film drug delivery technology as used in Listerine PocketPacks breath freshening strips. A specific ingredient list naming all additives has not been made public for any of the Camel Dissolvables brands. The products were sold with two flavors, mellow or fresh/mint.

== Ariva and Stonewall dissolvables ==
From 2001 to 2012, Star Scientific manufactured two brands of dissolvable tobacco in the US, Ariva and Stonewall, both made with powdered compressed tobacco. They were said to be marketed as a means of "reducing toxins in tobacco so that adult consumers can have access to products that expose them to sharply reduced toxin levels" while still providing consumers with tobacco and nicotine. Star Scientific recommended Ariva brand for smokers and Stonewall for heavy smokers, defined as smokers who consume more than one pack a day, and users of other smokeless tobacco products such as snuff. In 2014, FDA issued NSE orders like in the case of the Camel products, covering seven Star Scientific (Rock Creek Pharmaceuticals) dissolvable tobacco products. A stop sale and distribution was required for Ariva Cinnamon, Ariva Wintergreen, Ariva Mint, Ariva Java, Ariva Citrus, Stonewall Natural, and Stonewall Java.

=== Ingredients ===
Ariva, introduced in 2001, contained 1.5 milligrams of nicotine in each piece and dissolved in the mouth in 10–30 minutes. Stonewall, introduced in 2003 had more surface area than the Ariva pieces and contained 4 milligrams of nicotine per piece, with each piece dissolving in 10–30 minutes. Ariva was sold in Wintergreen flavor and Stonewall was sold with Natural, Wintergreen, and Java flavors. Other than tobacco and "other natural and artificial flavorings," including the non-sugar sweetener sucralose, Star Scientific did not list product ingredients.

== Public health reactions ==
=== Underage consumption ===
From the introduction of Ariva in 2001 there have been several public health claims that the dissolvable tobacco products pose a serious risk for unintentional poisonings in children and adolescents. Petitions from the American Cancer Society, Campaign for Tobacco-Free Kids, Attorneys General from 39 states, and multiple public health organizations were sent to the FDA asking for regulation of the Ariva brand and similar products.

A study on unintentional child poisonings from ingestion of tobacco products also assessed the toxicity of Camel Orbs, which "are of concern due to their discreet form, candy-like appearance, and added flavorings that may be attractive to young children." Reynolds and Star Scientific critiqued the study.

=== Harm reduction ===
A panel of public health researchers suggested that low nitrosamine smokeless tobacco products such as dissolvables could be a less harmful form of tobacco compared to cigarettes.
