= Kubera (disambiguation) =

Kubera is the Hindu god of wealth and fortune.

Kubera or Kuberan may also refer to:

- Vaisravana, the Buddhist equivalent of the Hindu deity
- Kuberan (actor), Indian actor
- Kuberan (2000 film), an Indian Tamil-language film
- Kuberan (2002 film), an Indian Malayalam-language film
- Kuberaa (2025 film), an Indian Telugu-language film
- Jaroslav Kubera, a Czech politician

== See also ==
- Kuber (disambiguation)
- Bishamon (disambiguation), the Japanese name for Vaisravana
