= Tobacco usage in sport =

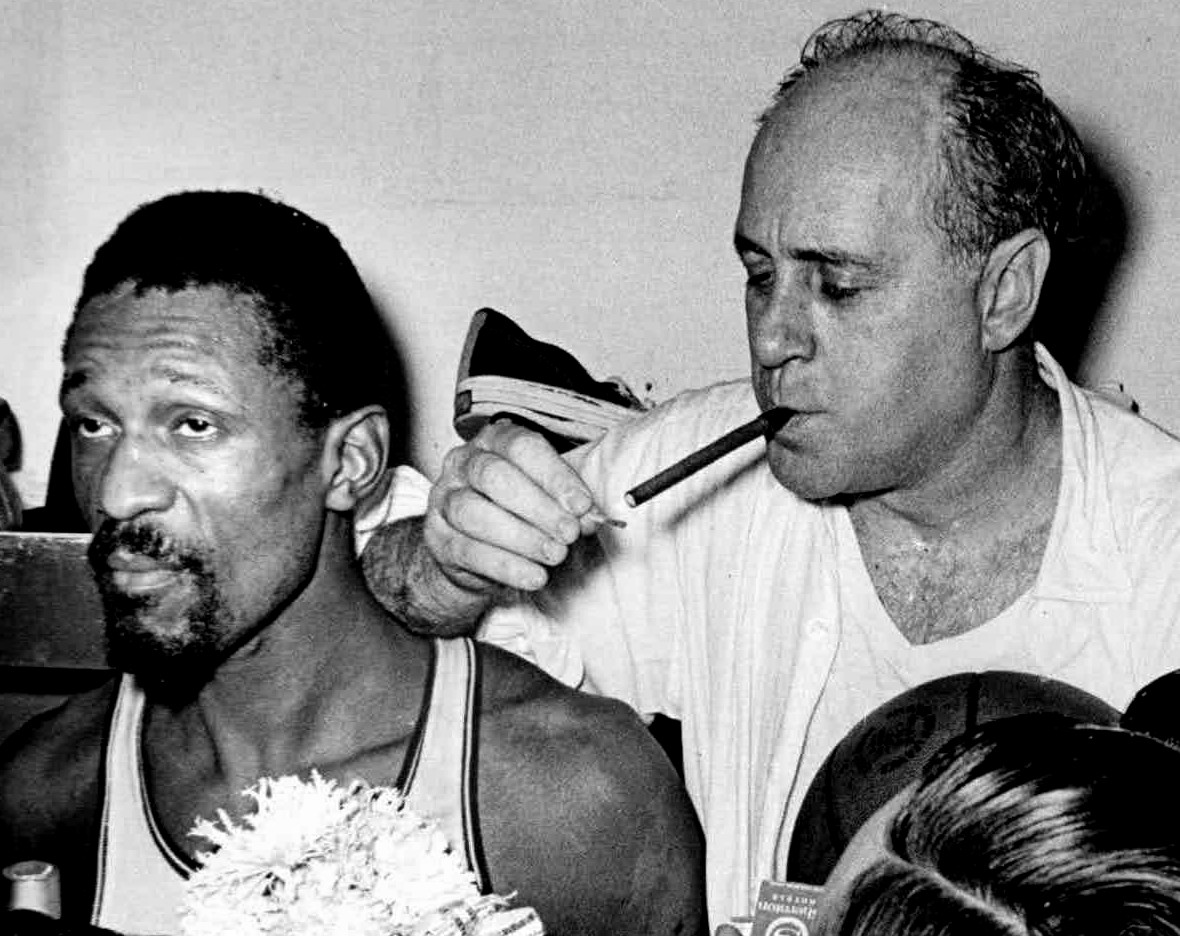
Red Auerbach, longtime coach of the Boston Celtics, lighting a cigar after his team won the 1966 NBA Finals

Tobacco usage in sport is a well documented and publicised occurrence. Tobacco advertising has connected itself to sports both for the connotations of health that sports provide, as well as the marketing potential of famous athletes. Additionally, tobacco has played a role in the sport of baseball specifically and has affected both the rules affecting players and fan alike. Agencies such as the CDC have used sports as platforms for tobacco prevention programs, specifically targeted at younger people.

== Advertising by country ==
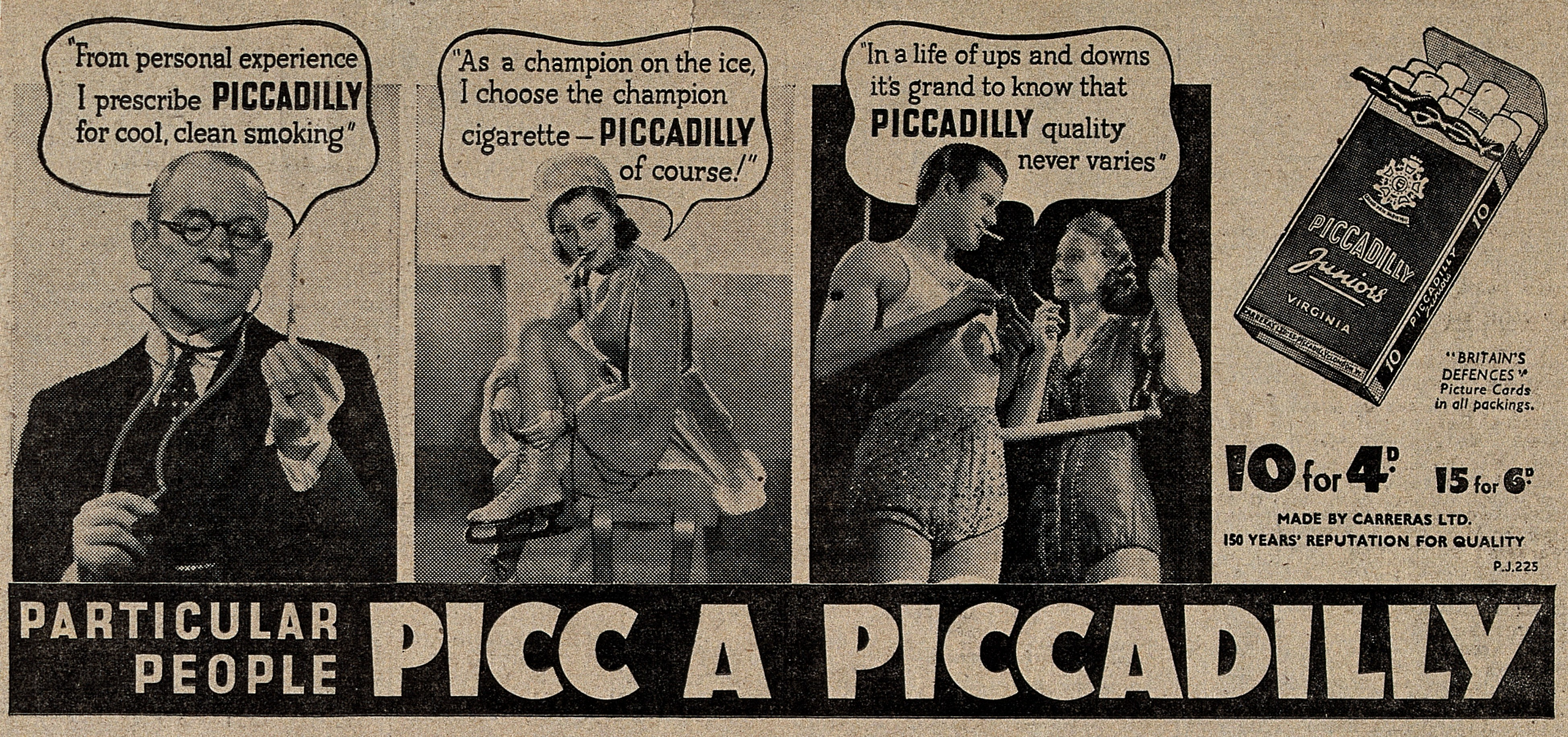
A British advert for Piccadilly cigarettes featuring athletes c. 1939

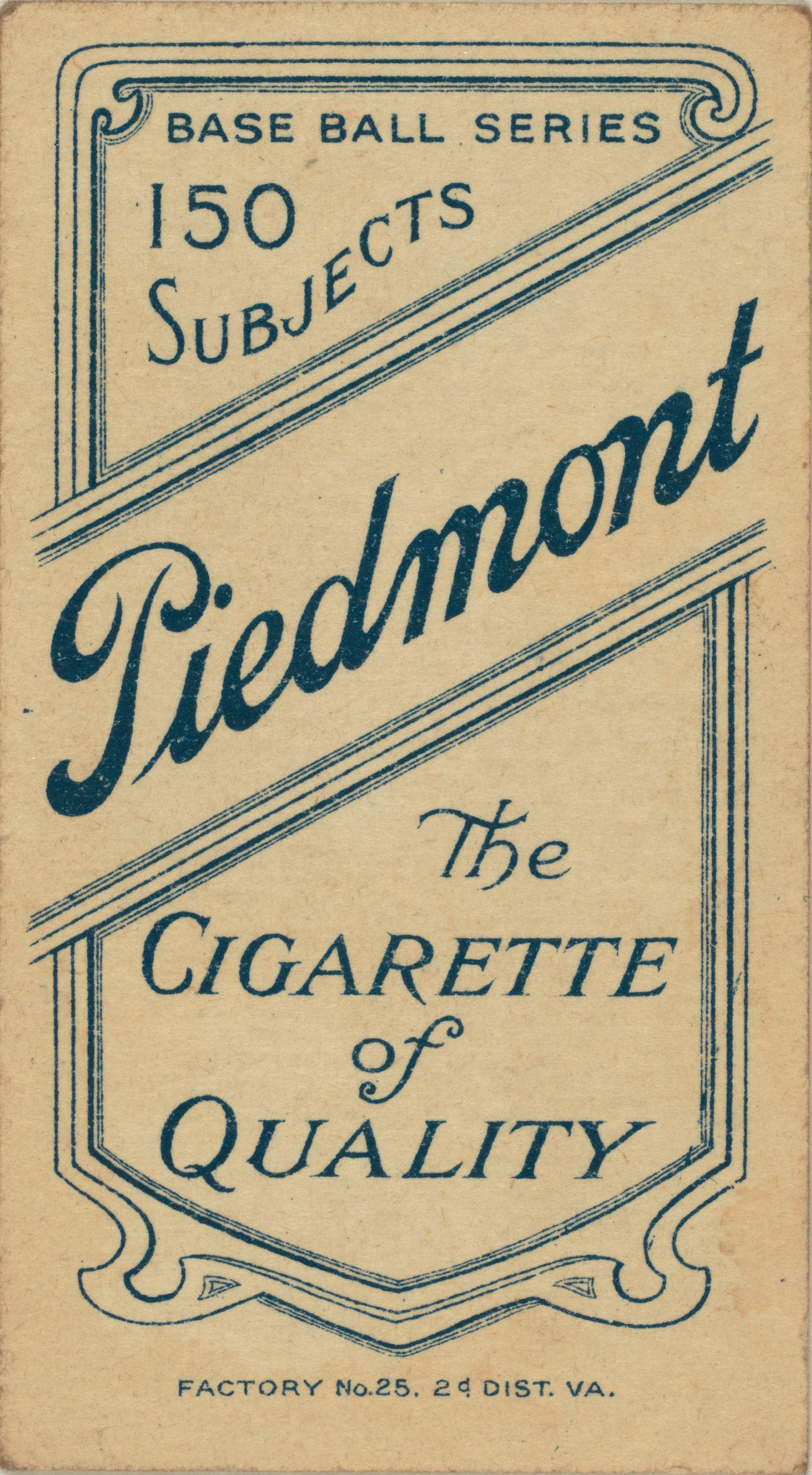
Tobacco advertising on the back of an American baseball card c. 1910

In the early 1900s the tobacco industry sought to pair smoking with active and healthy lifestyles. Through its advertisements, the tobacco industry created associations between smoking and recreational and athletic activities like tennis, golf, swimming, football, track and field, skiing, and ice skating. These activities were often depicted in cigarette advertising as activities demanding a cigarette for enhanced performance and even good health. American Tobacco's Lucky Strikes ran a successful advertising campaign that urged men and women “To keep a slender figure, reach for a Lucky instead of a sweet.” Smokeless tobacco in baseball urged adolescents to buy their product by using slogans such as "May cause the urge to act like a man."

=== Australia ===
One of the first countries to ever legislate the end of tobacco advertising and sponsorship at sporting events was Australia.

Quit Victoria in Australia, stated that the three major sponsors for sport in 1980 were the largest tobacco companies. In 1989, the tobacco industry put a whopping 34 million dollars into cricket and rugby league. Although advertisement of tobacco products on television had been banned in 1976, on ground advertising and naming rights to oppositions and events was tactically used by tobacco companies; for example, the Benson and Hedges logo would appear for approximately 90 minutes in a day's play of test cricket. The tobacco advertising prohibition act 1992, prohibited nearly all of tobaccos advertising and sponsorships in sporting events. However, under section 18 of the Act, there was power to allow an exception to the general ban on tobacco advertising in Australia for sporting events of international significance. In 2000, there was an amendment to remove this act and Australian sport became totally tobacco sponsorship and advertisement free in October 2006.

=== China ===
In October 2009, Baisha, China’s largest cigarette company, signed Liu Xiang, an Olympic gold medalist hurdler, to endorse its cigarettes in both print advertisements and televised commercials.

=== United Kingdom ===
In the United Kingdom, the cigarette manufacturer John Player & Sons sponsored cricket during the 1960s and 1970s, despite the ban of cigarette advertising from British television.

=== United States ===
For many years, tobacco companies have played a monumental role in advertising within the sports industry. Major tobacco companies have employed the strategies of athletic endorsements, sponsorships of major athletic events, and creating powerful associations of tobacco and active lifestyles in order to advertise their products. The connection between sports and tobacco can be traced back to the origins of professional sports. Shortly after the National Baseball League's inception in 1876, trading cards with player's images emerged within cigarette packages. One of the oldest brands of chewing tobacco, Bull Durham, advertised on outfield fences in baseball parks in the United States South. Despite this long-standing history, there have been many recent developments and changes in tobacco's relation to athletics. Currently, trends have shifted as athletes today are more likely to endorse tobacco prevention efforts as opposed to tobacco products.

==== Endorsements ====
From the 1920s to 1940s baseball furthered its relation with the tobacco industry. Every major-league team had a cigarette sponsor and baseball's greatest athletes such as Babe Ruth, Joe DiMaggio, and Ted Williams, all appeared in cigarette advertisements. Lou Gehrig endorsed R. J. Reynolds’ Camels, saying he could smoke as many as he pleased and creating the slogan that Camels “don’t get your wind.”

As tensions mounted in the 1950s, with correlation between smoking and lung cancer, the Commissioner of Baseball prohibited players from wearing their uniforms in cigarette advertisements. While baseball cracked down on endorsements, the National Football League not only permitted players to appear in tobacco advertisements but also signed Philip Morris’ Marlboro as its major television sponsor. Of these players, one of the most prominent was Frank Gifford. Gifford played for the New York Giants in the 1950s and 1960s and later became a famous sportscaster. In his prime, Gifford endorsed a wide range of products, including the American Tobacco Company's Lucky Strike cigarettes.

In 1964, the tobacco industry began to anticipate increased federal regulation and voluntarily adopted the Cigarette Advertising Code, stating it would not “depict as a smoker any person well known as being, or having been, an athlete…[or] any person participating in, or obviously having just participated in, physical activity requiring stamina or athletic conditioning beyond that of normal recreation”. Under this code, athletes and celebrities were no longer allowed to give testimonials, but nonetheless the industry blatantly disregarded its own industry self-regulation.

==== Sponsorships ====
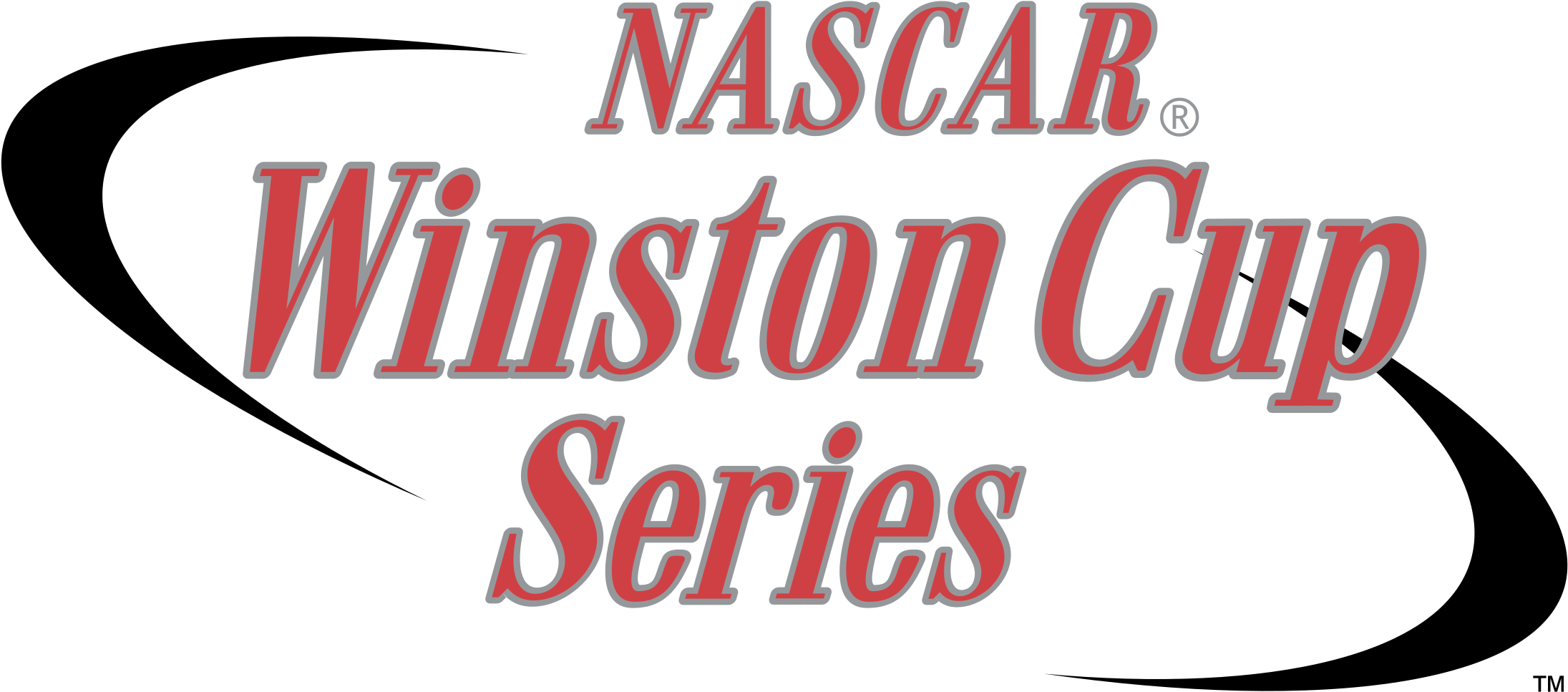
Logo of the since-renamed Winston Cup Series in NASCAR

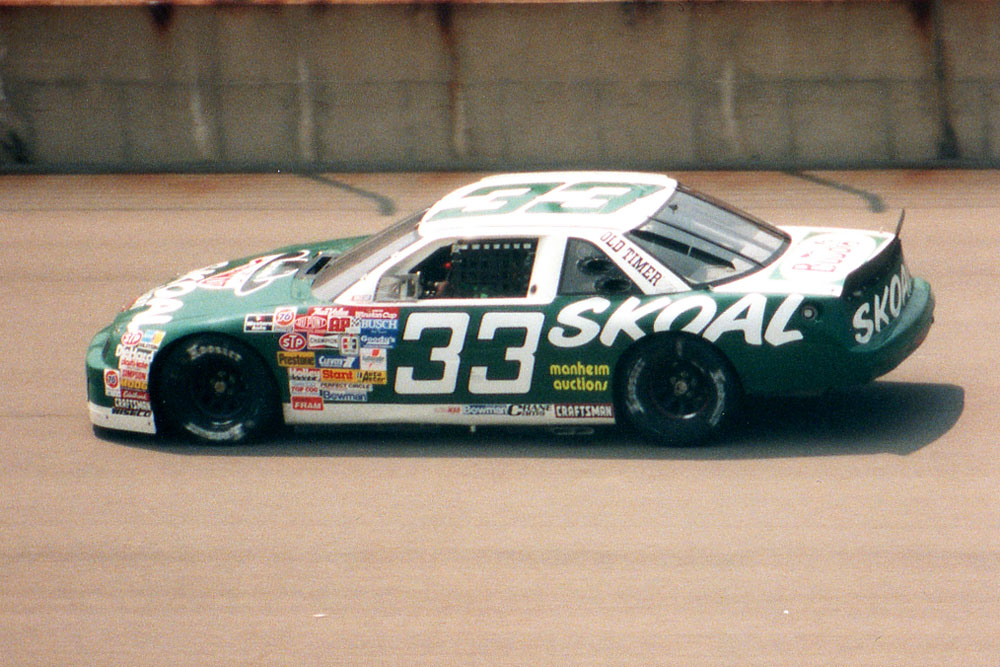
A NASCAR entry with Skoal smokeless tobacco as the primary sponsor in 1994

Traditionally, cigarette companies have had a strong relationship with motor racing. After tobacco companies were forced to pull out of advertising in NASCAR, Nicorette entered the NASCAR arena and signed a three-year contract as part of an extension by GlaxoSmithKline, then the owner of Goody's Headache Powders, a long-time NASCAR sponsor. NASCAR's deal with Nicorette was only for one year, but its association with Hendrick Motorsports lasted from 2006 to 2008 with Jeff Gordon with sponsorship on the hood and primary colours (Gordon from 1993 to 2010 required the identity of the former DuPont and Nemours company on the side and tail panels, so the Nicorette on the hood was accompanied by DuPont on the side). Winston stepped down after 33 years as title sponsor of NASCAR's championship series and was replaced by Nextel. Nicorette sees a great market as NASCAR fans are 28% more likely to smoke than other adults. The firm also reported that they smoke 18% more cigarettes than other adults. Since Nicorette has signed on as a sponsor, there has been a substantial decrease in the amount of NASCAR employees who smoke. Nicorette began its quit smoking program in 2004, providing NASCAR members with training sessions and one-on-one counseling. Additionally, Nicorette has counseled about 250,000 race fans on how to quit smoking since 2005.

Cigarette companies have explored the sponsorship of rodeo since the early 1970s. From 1986 to 2009 the Professional Rodeo Cowboys Association was sponsored by the U.S. Smokeless Tobacco Company as well as the National Intercollegiate Rodeo Association (NIRA) since 1974. The association severed its ties with the tobacco industry in 2009, allowing rodeo culture to return to its status before tobacco's involvement in 1986. “Cowboy Ted” Hallisey, a prominent print and broadcast journalist for rodeo events stated “Without big tobacco, rodeos will move into mainstream sports because they will be more comfortable for children and families to attend”.

== Consumption ==
There is only limited evidence about the association of tobacco and sports:

- A survey of 5,400 Swiss men (average age of 26 years old) found that participants practising a sport had a lower smoking rate (32 %) and a higher rate of snus (15 %) use than participants not practicing a sport (45 % smoking and 10 % using snus). Individual-sport participants were less likely to use snus and more likely to vape, compared with team-sport participants. Participants practising high-intensity sports had a lower likelihood to smoke cigarettes, compared with low-intensity sports.
- A survey on 540 university students (in health or education) in Spain (average age of 21 years old) found that women showed a lower habit on sports practice and a higher tobacco consumption. The analysis showed a trend towards a lower sport practice among the smokers.
- A survey on 550 adolescent athletes (12-16 years old) in Spain found that practicing a medium-high-contact sports was a risk factor for alcohol and tobacco use.

=== Smokeless tobacco ===
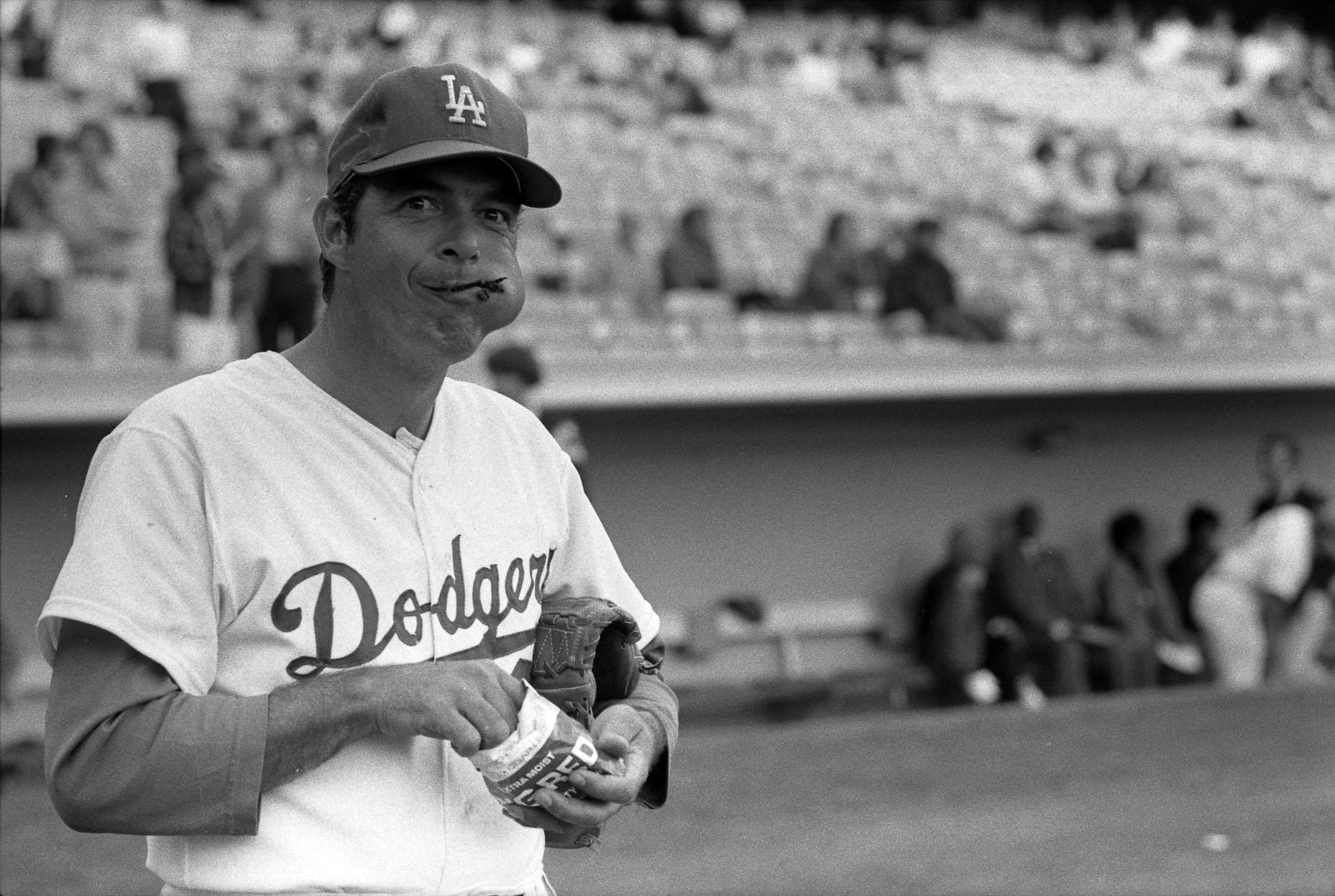
Pitcher Jim Brewer with chewing tobacco in 1974

Smokeless tobacco: chewing tobacco, spit tobacco, dry snuff, snus, or tabac à chiquer in France, is common in some sports. There is little data on the number of athletes that use smokeless tobacco, but a study showed that approximately 45 percent of major league baseball players have been reported to use smokeless tobacco. Athletes apparently used smokeless tobacco to enhance their performance because nicotine improved certain aspects of physiology. However, it has been found that smokeless tobacco can cause many harmful health effects such as cancer, mouth and tooth problems, heart disease and high blood pressure.

== Baseball and tobacco ==
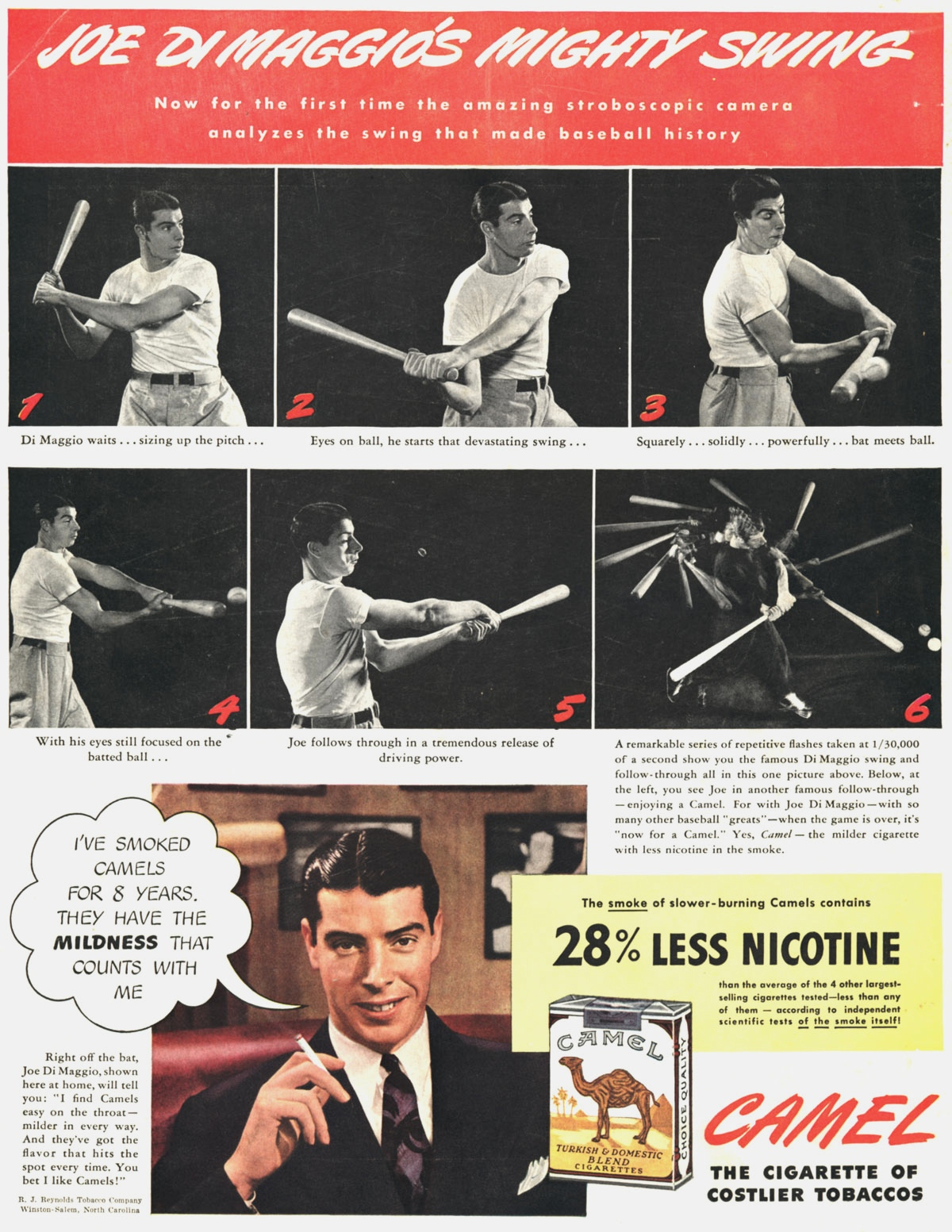
Cigarette advertisement featuring Joe Dimaggio in 1941

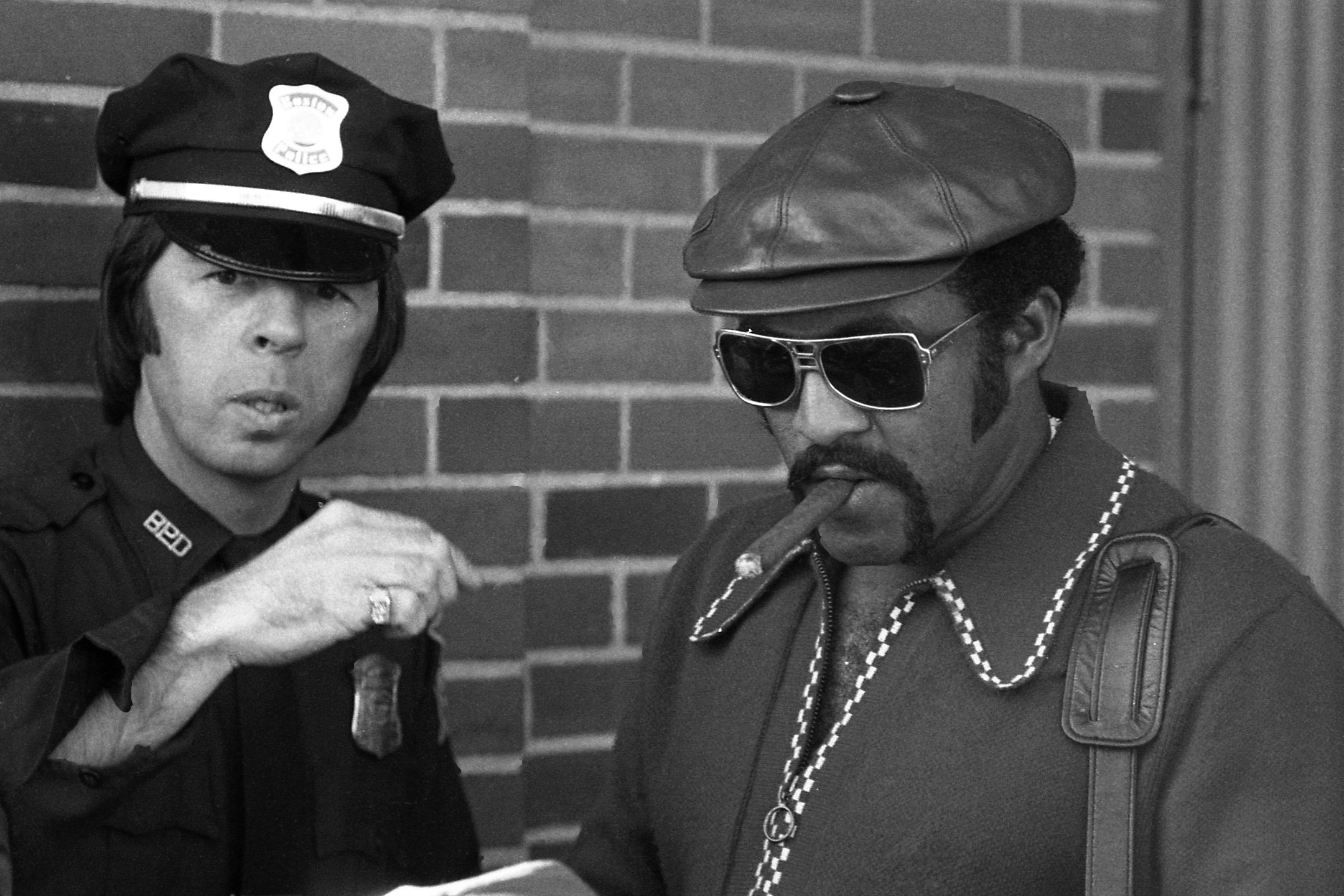
Pitcher Luis Tiant smoking a cigar outside Fenway Park in the 1970s

Between 1920 until 1940, when baseball was America's most popular sport, every major-league team had a tobacco sponsor. It is common perception that many baseball players use tobacco. However, as of 2008, this practice was changing and declining, according to Major League Baseball (MLB).

A reason chewing tobacco usage increased among baseball players, according to one source, was the misconception that it improved concentration, overall performance, and was less harmful than tobacco smoking. Contrary to this, chewing tobacco does not have an established connection to the performance of baseball players. As more information about the dangers of chewing tobacco has come to light it has become stigmatized within baseball itself with players, staff and managers often having to "sneak" off to partake. These individuals understand that children will easily copy their actions and try to hide them now, as they are negative role models for youth. Most players have made attempts to quit, but the majority struggle in breaking their addiction. Lenny Dykstra, the former Philadelphia Phillies center-fielder, started dipping at a young age, unaware of how difficult quitting would be. He tells young children, "They call me 'Nails' because they say I'm as tough as nails. But I'm not tough enough to beat the spit-tobacco habit. Copy my hustle, copy my determination. But don't copy my spit-tobacco habit."

=== Policies ===
Additionally, MLB has taken actions to lower tobacco usage amongst its players. This includes a complete ban on tobacco in Minor League Baseball, with fines for players and their managers if it is discovered. In MLB, tobacco companies are prohibited from leaving free products in stadium clubhouses for the players, along with a ban effective from December 2016, that prohibits players entering MLB for the first time from using tobacco, while players who had prior experience in MLB were grandfathered, per the Collective Bargaining Agreement with the Major League Baseball Players Association (MLBPA).

Ballparks have stricter tobacco policies for patrons as well, though the level of strictness varies per stadium. As of January 2023, a majority of ballparks used by MLB teams prohibit smoking and do not allow patrons to leave and re-enter in order to smoke. The exceptions are (by team):

- Smoking allowed in designated locations inside the ballpark: Colorado Rockies and Milwaukee Brewers
- Smoking allowed in designated locations external to the ballpark: Atlanta Braves, Kansas City Royals, Los Angeles Angels, and St. Louis Cardinals
- Patrons are allowed to exit the facility and later re-enter: Arizona Diamondbacks, Cincinnati Reds, and Cleveland Guardians

== Tobacco prevention and sports ==
The majority of tobacco smokers start smoking before they graduate high school. The CDC has identified youth sports as an area where tobacco education and prevention will help limit the number of first time smokers and has begun a Tobacco Free Sports Movement to encourage non smoking practices in athletics. The CDC has paired with many large organizations to achieve this goal. These include public health agencies such as the National Cancer Institute, and sport regulatory bodies such as FIFA and the International Olympic Committee to further the efforts of tobacco elimination in sports. The 2008 Beijing Olympics banned not only tobacco usage, but advertising, sponsorship, promotion and sale of tobacco products in Olympic venues. The last Olympic Games with a tobacco company as a sponsor were in 1984, and control has gotten stricter since then (as can be seen from the Beijing regulations). On a smaller scale there are regional efforts to create tobacco free sports initiatives such as the Tobacco-Free Athletes of Maine. This organization seeks to have coaches educate their young athletes about the effects of tobacco.

Many athletes have become spokespersons for anti-tobacco and tobacco prevention efforts. Early in the 20th century Hall of Fame baseball player Honus Wagner would not allow a cigarette company to use his picture on a tobacco trading card. Since then famous athletes like skateboarder Tony Hawk and baseball player Sammy Sosa have supported tobacco prevention. Events such as the American Cancer Society's Great American Smokeout also make use of athletes to support their anti-tobacco efforts. In 2000, the American Cancer Society had Alonzo Mourning of the Miami Heat (with other athletes) speak to children about the dangers of smoking.

In the 2010 Winter Olympics, the Canada women's national ice hockey team celebrated their gold medal victory on the ice with both cigars and tobacco. As the Vancouver Olympics were a tobacco free event, the International Olympic Committee decided to look into the celebration since it was a breach of tobacco control rules.

Notable athletes who have supported tobacco prevention in sport include:

- Jerome Bettis (American football)
- Cris Carter (American football)
- Ben Grieve (baseball)
- Tony Hawk (skateboarding)
- Alonzo Mourning (basketball)
- Honus Wagner (baseball)

== See also ==
- Campaign for Tobacco-Free Kids
- Nicotine marketing
  - Electronic cigarette and e-cigarette liquid marketing
  - Regulation of nicotine marketing
- Smoking in association football
