= Iqmik =

Smokeless tobacco product

Iqmik, also called blackbull, is a smokeless tobacco product. It is used mainly by Native Americans in parts of Alaska, and is made from a mixture of tobacco and the ash of Phellinus igniarius, informally called punk ash.

== Prevalence ==
In 2005, over 50% of Yupik-Eskimos were reported to consume iqmik. Iqmik is commonly believed to be a healthier alternative to commercially available dipping tobacco because there are no added chemicals. However, it is reported to deliver more nicotine than dipping tobacco. Another reason for high usage is its traditional status in Native society. Even young children use iqmik in the remote villages of Alaska. Of all smokeless tobacco use across Alaska, iqmik accounts for 16%.

The ingredients for iqmik can be purchased at general stores in Western Alaska. It is typically prepared by the user, who purchases tobacco leaf and punk ash separately and then combines them.
