= Mokujiki =

Japanese ascetic practice

Mokujiki (木食, 'eating of trees/wood') is a Japanese ascetic practice involving abstinence from cereals and cooked foods, replaced by consuming foods gathered from mountain forests. Adherents often rely primarily on flour made from buckwheat or wild oats, supplementing their diet with pine bark, chestnuts, torreya nuts, grass roots, and other wild plants. This mountain diet is considered to possess spiritual energy and purity, contrasting with typical worldly diets based on cereals. Some practitioners observe it annually for brief periods on sacred mountains, while others commit for years or even vow to practice it for life. Those who take the lifetime vow adopt mokujiki as part of their religious name. The practice was a critical part of preparation for self-mummification.

== History ==
Mokujiki implies the active consumption of food from forests. A related term, kokudachi (穀断ち), refers specifically to abstention from cereals. A practitioner abstains from either five or ten specific cereals, with the exact list varying by tradition. Abstention from grains originated in China, where it was a common ascetic practice in the late 2nd and 1st centuries BCE and is still practiced today as bigu (辟穀).

Recorded instances of mokujiki in Japan date back to the ninth century, mentioned in the Nihon Montoku Tennō Jitsuroku. Mokujiki has been practiced in various forms throughout Japanese history. It peaked during the Edo period (c. 1500s to late 1800s), though it continues to be practiced today. The northeastern region of Japan was a historical heartland of the practice.

Taoist concepts of the body significantly influenced the origins of Mokujiki. In Taoist thought, "three worms" (sanchū or sanshi, 三尸, "three corpses") were believed to reside within the body, accelerating decay and death, especially when fed by cereals. Consequently, abstaining from cereals was widely seen in East Asia as a means to prolong life and enhance spiritual abilities.

Despite having no basis in Buddhist scripture, the practice is integral to Japanese Buddhist culture. It is found in various Buddhist sects and is particularly prominent in Shugen-do and esoteric Buddhist traditions. Kūkai, the founder of Shingon, is said to have abstained from cereals at different times, including his final days; his example has strongly influenced subsequent mokujiki practitioners. It is likely that mokujiki spread from esoteric schools to Pure Land Buddhism.

== Variations ==
The requirements of mokujiki practice varied among spiritual communities and over time. In the eighteenth-century Mokujiki Yōa Shōnin Eden, a distinction was made between the "great mokujiki", which involved abstaining from ten cereals, and the "lesser mokujiki", which involved abstaining from five. The specific cereals omitted varied depending on the tradition. For many practitioners, following the "lesser mokujiki" path was a prerequisite to the "greater".

Some variations of the practice permitted the consumption of buckwheat, which served as a durable, easily-digestible, portable staple that did not require cooking. Modern and contemporary practice often includes the consumption of buckwheat paste. Although consuming buckwheat might appear inconsistent with mokujiki, adherents who eat it regard it as a wild mountain plant rather than one of the forbidden cultivated cereals. This interpretation was common by the Edo period. Wild oats and powdered broad beans have also served a similar role.

Many practitioners avoided all cooked foods and salt; some went as far as to avoid seaweed.

== Adherents ==
=== Hijiri ===
By the twelfth century, mokujiki was established as one of the practices of wandering ascetics known as hijiri. (The hijiri were also called ubasoku, yamabushi, or yūgyōsha.) Driven by profound spiritual experiences, they undertook penances, including mokujiki, with the goal of achieving ikigami, a state of living divinity - or sokushinbutsu, realizing "a Buddha in this very body" (self-mummification). Other practices included reciting mantras, undergoing cold water austerities, and constant wandering.

=== Shugendo sect ===
Mokujiki was undertaken by some ascetics of the Shugen-do sect within Shingon as part of their preparation for self-mummification (sokushinbutsu). The combination of Mokujiki and fasting reduced body fat, which facilitated the preservation of their bodies with minimal additional preparation. Their period of mokujiki observance lasted from one thousand to several thousand days, spent in seclusion in designated spots for ascetic practices. This practice was also considered part of their training.

== Notable adherents ==
- Kūkai (空海, 774–835), founder of the Shingon school of esoteric Buddhism.
- Gyōshō (行勝, 1130–1217), a Shingon follower described as "perhaps the best-known medieval mokujiki practitioner".
- Mokujiki Ōgo (木食応其, 1536–1608), a former warrior turned Shingon monk who acted as a peace broker during the military campaigns of Toyotomi Hideyoshi on Mt. Kōya and at the Battle of Sekigahara.
- Mokujiki Shonin (木喰上人, 1718–1810), an 18th-century wandering monk famous for carving Buddhist statues and leaving them throughout Japan. The rediscovery of his artwork significantly influenced the mingei movement in the early 20th century.
