= Smokeless tobacco =

Tobacco product used by means other than smoking

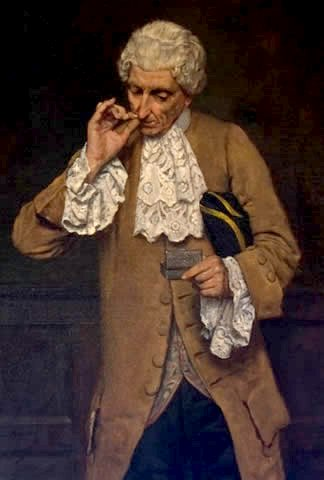
A historical depiction of a man taking snuff using his thumb and forefinger

Smokeless tobacco is a tobacco product that is used by means other than smoking. Their use involves chewing, sniffing, or placing the product between gum and the cheek or lip. Smokeless tobacco products are produced in various forms, such as chewing tobacco, snuff, snus, and dissolvable tobacco products. Related non-combustible oral nicotine products, such as nicotine pouches, contain nicotine but may not contain tobacco leaf. Smokeless tobacco is particularly popular in South Asia, with this region accounting for about 80% of global smokeless tobacco consumption. All smokeless tobacco products contain nicotine and are therefore highly addictive. Quitting smokeless tobacco use is as challenging as smoking cessation.

Using smokeless tobacco can cause various harmful effects such as dental disease, oral cancer, oesophagus cancer, and pancreas cancer, coronary heart disease, as well as negative reproductive effects including stillbirth, premature birth and low birth weight. Smokeless tobacco poses a lower health risk than traditional combusted products. However it is not a healthy alternative to cigarette smoking. The level of risk varies between different types of products (e.g., low nitrosamine Swedish-type snus versus other smokeless tobacco with high nitrosamine levels) and producing regions. There is no safe level of smokeless tobacco use. Globally it contributes to 650 000 deaths each year.

Smokeless tobacco products typically contain over 3000 constituents, which includes multiple cancer-causing chemicals. Approximately 28 chemical constituents present in smokeless tobacco can cause cancer, among which nitrosamine is the most prominent. Smokeless tobacco consumption is widespread throughout the world. Once addicted to nicotine from smokeless tobacco use, many people, particularly young people, expand their tobacco use by smoking cigarettes. Males are more likely than females to use smokeless tobacco.

== Types ==
1894 Kinetoscope of Fred Ott taking a snuff and then sneezing, taken by Thomas Edison's laboratory

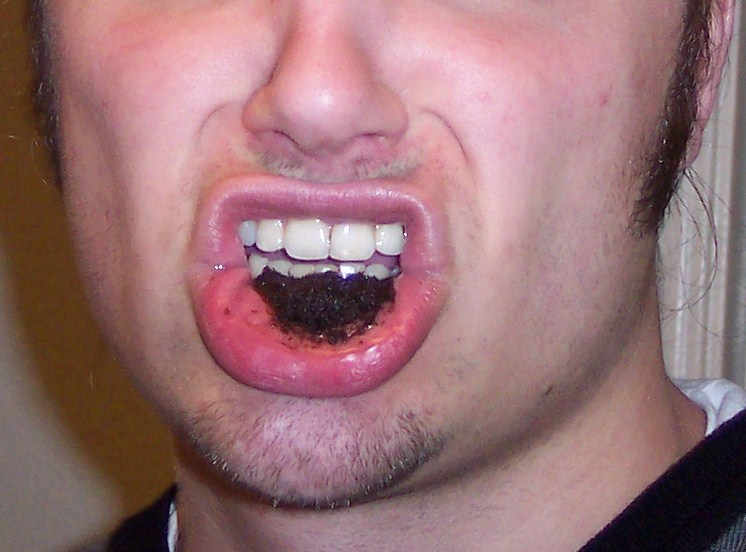
Dipping tobacco is placed between the lip and the gum (sublabial administration).

Most smokeless tobacco use involves placing the product between the gum and the cheek or lip. Smokeless tobacco is a noncombustible tobacco product.

Types of smokeless tobacco include:

- Mixed routes of administration:
  - Kuber, a smokeless tobacco product known for its highly addictive properties and its unique presentation disguised as a mouth freshener. Users commonly add it to tea or consume it directly by placing a pinch under the lower lip.
- Nasal administration:
  - Snuff, a type of tobacco that is inhaled or "snuffed" into the nasal cavity. Traditionally, a specialized tool called a snuff spoon was used for this purpose. However, modern users may simply pinch the snuff between their thumb and forefinger or use pre-measured packets.
- Oral (buccal, sublabial, or sublingual):
  - Chewing tobacco, a type of tobacco that is chewed
  - Creamy snuff, a fluid tobacco mixture marketed as a dental hygiene aid, albeit used for recreation
  - Dipping tobacco, a type of tobacco that is placed between the lower or upper lip and gums. This form of tobacco (Hindi: Khaini) is commonly used in Indian subcontinent. It is the second most common form of tobacco consumption in India, after cigarrette smoking.
  - Dissolvable tobacco, a variation on chewing tobacco that completely dissolves in the mouth
  - Gutka, a mixture of tobacco, areca nut, and various flavoring sold in South Asia
  - Iqmik, an Alaskan tobacco product which also contains punk ash
  - Naswar, an Afghan tobacco product similar to dipping tobacco
  - Pituri, a nicotine-containing substance traditionally made from Australian tobacco plants, used by Indigenous Australians for chewing and placed between the lower lip and gums. They use it in high doses to induce stupor or trance.
  - Snus, similar to dipping tobacco although the tobacco is placed under the upper lip and there is no need for spitting
  - Tobacco chewing gum, a kind of chewing gum containing tobacco
  - Toombak and shammah, preparations found in North Africa, East Africa, and the Arabian peninsula
- Topical:
  - Topical tobacco paste, a paste applied to the skin and absorbed through the dermis

Since there are varied manufacturing methods, products can differ greatly in chemical arrangement and nicotine level. Smokeless tobacco products typically contain over 3000 constituents which play a part in their taste as well as scent.

=== Nicotine levels ===
Smokeless tobacco differs depending on the type of product, the types of tobacco used, and the amount of each tobacco type used within a product. Each variable results in different level of nicotine. Furthermore, nicotine is absorbed by the body to different degrees depending on the pH level of the product, which is known as the free nicotine or unionized nicotine level.

Below are some measured nicotine levels of various smokeless tobacco products from 2006 and 2007 and their corresponding free nicotine levels as calculated by the Henderson–Hasselbalch equation.

Product	Nicotine (mg/g)	Free Nicotine (mg/g)	Free Nicotine (% of total nicotine)	pH	Type	Form	Year
Ariva	3.90	0.70	17.95	7.36	dissolvable, dry	pieces	2007
Stonewall Natural	8.19	1.17	14.23	7.24	dissolvable, dry	pieces	2007
Beech-nut Chewing Tobacco	7.07	0.02	0.35	5.56	loose leaf	loose	2006
Hawken Wintergreen	2.92	0.01	0.22	5.37	loose leaf	cut	2007
Lancaster Premium Chewing Tobacco	8.01	0.01	0.11	5.05	loose leaf	loose	2007
Levi Garrett Chewing Tobacco	5.34	0.06	1.19	6.10	loose leaf	loose	2006
Red Man Chewing Tobacco	8.58	0.08	0.88	5.97	loose leaf	loose	2006
Red Man Golden Chewing Tobacco	7.70	0.06	0.72	5.88	loose leaf	loose	2006
Stoker Chew Apple Chewing Tobacco	3.77	0.01	0.22	5.37	loose leaf	loose	2007
Taylor's Pride	6.43	0.06	0.90	5.98	plug	one cut	2006
Catch Dry Eucalyptus	15.93	1.39	8.72	7.00	snuff, dry	pouch	2006
Catch Dry Licorice	16.70	0.68	4.09	6.65	snuff, dry	pouch	2006
Skoal Dry	11.91	2.39	20.08	7.42	snuff, dry	pouch	2007
Taboka	16.73	0.36	2.14	6.36	snuff, dry	pouch	2007
Taboka Green	13.01	0.48	3.66	6.60	snuff, dry	pouch	2007
Bruton Scotch Snuff	17.49	0.49	2.80	6.48	snuff, dry	powder	2006
Dental Sweet Snuff	11.14	0.13	1.19	6.10	snuff, dry	powder	2006
Levi Garrett Snuff	16.60	0.07	0.42	5.65	snuff, dry	powder	2007
Railroad Mills Plain Scotch Snuff	23.13	0.48	2.09	6.35	snuff, dry	powder	2007
Red Seal Sweet Snuff	15.08	0.40	2.62	6.45	snuff, dry	powder	2007
Camel Frost	13.25	4.70	35.46	7.76	snuff, moist	pouch	2006
Camel Frost	14.10	4.71	33.39	7.72	snuff, moist	pouch	2007
Camel Original	13.87	4.70	33.90	7.73	snuff, moist	pouch	2006
Camel Original	13.49	6.20	45.98	7.95	snuff, moist	pouch	2007
Camel Spice	13.16	6.65	50.58	8.03	snuff, moist	pouch	2006
Camel Spice	13.16	6.65	50.58	8.03	snuff, moist	pouch	2007
Cooper Long Cut Wintergreen	7.97	1.09	13.68	7.22	snuff, moist	long cut	2007
Copenhagen	12.68	3.21	25.31	7.55	snuff, moist	fine cut	2006
Copenhagen Long Cut	13.91	5.38	38.69	7.82	snuff, moist	long cut	2006
Copenhagen Pouches	11.21	6.81	60.77	8.21	snuff, moist	fine cut	2006
General Loose	7.15	1.87	26.19	7.57	snuff, moist	coarse	2006
General Original Portion	8.46	5.10	60.22	8.20	snuff, moist	pouch	2006
General White Portion	7.92	4.81	60.77	8.21	snuff, moist	pouch	2006
Grizzly Long Cut Wintergreen	10.29	6.59	64.01	8.27	snuff, moist	long cut	2006
Grizzly Long Cut Wintergreen	11.20	5.86	52.30	8.06	snuff, moist	long cut	2007
Husky Fine Cut Natural	12.86	4.77	37.06	7.79	snuff, moist	fine cut	2007
Kayak Long Cut Wintergreen	11.88	2.26	18.99	7.39	snuff, moist	long cut	2007
Kodiak Premium Wintergreen	10.93	6.52	59.66	8.19	snuff, moist	long cut	2006
Kodiak Premium Wintergreen	10.70	8.18	76.39	8.53	snuff, moist	long cut	2007
Longhorn Long Cut Wintergreen	13.79	5.72	41.45	7.87	snuff, moist	long cut	2007
Red Seal Fine Cut Natural	13.17	3.11	23.61	7.51	snuff, moist	fine cut	2007
Renegades Wintergreen	13.36	2.40	17.95	7.36	snuff, moist	pouch	2007
Skoal Fine Cut Original	13.31	3.85	28.95	7.63	snuff, moist	fine cut	2006
Skoal Long Cut Cherry	12.70	1.67	13.15	7.20	snuff, moist	long cut	2006
Skoal Long Cut Mint	12.93	3.68	28.47	7.62	snuff, moist	long cut	2006
Skoal Long Cut Straight	13.37	3.94	29.42	7.64	snuff, moist	long cut	2006
Skoal Long Cut Wintergreen	12.84	2.87	22.38	7.48	snuff, moist	long cut	2006
Timberwolf Long Cut Wintergreen	14.13	5.16	36.53	7.78	snuff, moist	long cut	2007

== Health effects ==
Various national and international health organizations, including the World Health Organization, the US National Cancer Institute, the UK Royal College of Physicians, stated that, even if it is less dangerous than smoking, using smokeless tobacco is addictive, represents a major health risk, has no safe level use and is not a safe substitute for smoking.

Using smokeless tobacco can cause a number of adverse health effects such as dental disease, oral cancer, oesophagus cancer, and pancreatic cancer, cardiovascular disease, asthma, and deformities in the female reproductive system. It also raises the risk of fatal coronary artery disease, fatal stroke and non-fatal ischaemic heart disease. Globally it contributes to 650 000 deaths each year with a significant proportion of them in Southeast Asia.

=== Smoking cessation and harm reduction ===
Quitting smokeless tobacco use is as challenging as smoking cessation. There is no scientific evidence that using smokeless tobacco can help a person quit smoking. It is not recommended to use any smokeless tobacco product as part of a harm reduction strategy. Tobacco companies that sell smokeless tobacco products promote them as harm reduction products and a less harmful substitute to cigarettes. This creates a false perception of safety while real risk reduction can be achieved by smoking less.

=== Safety ===
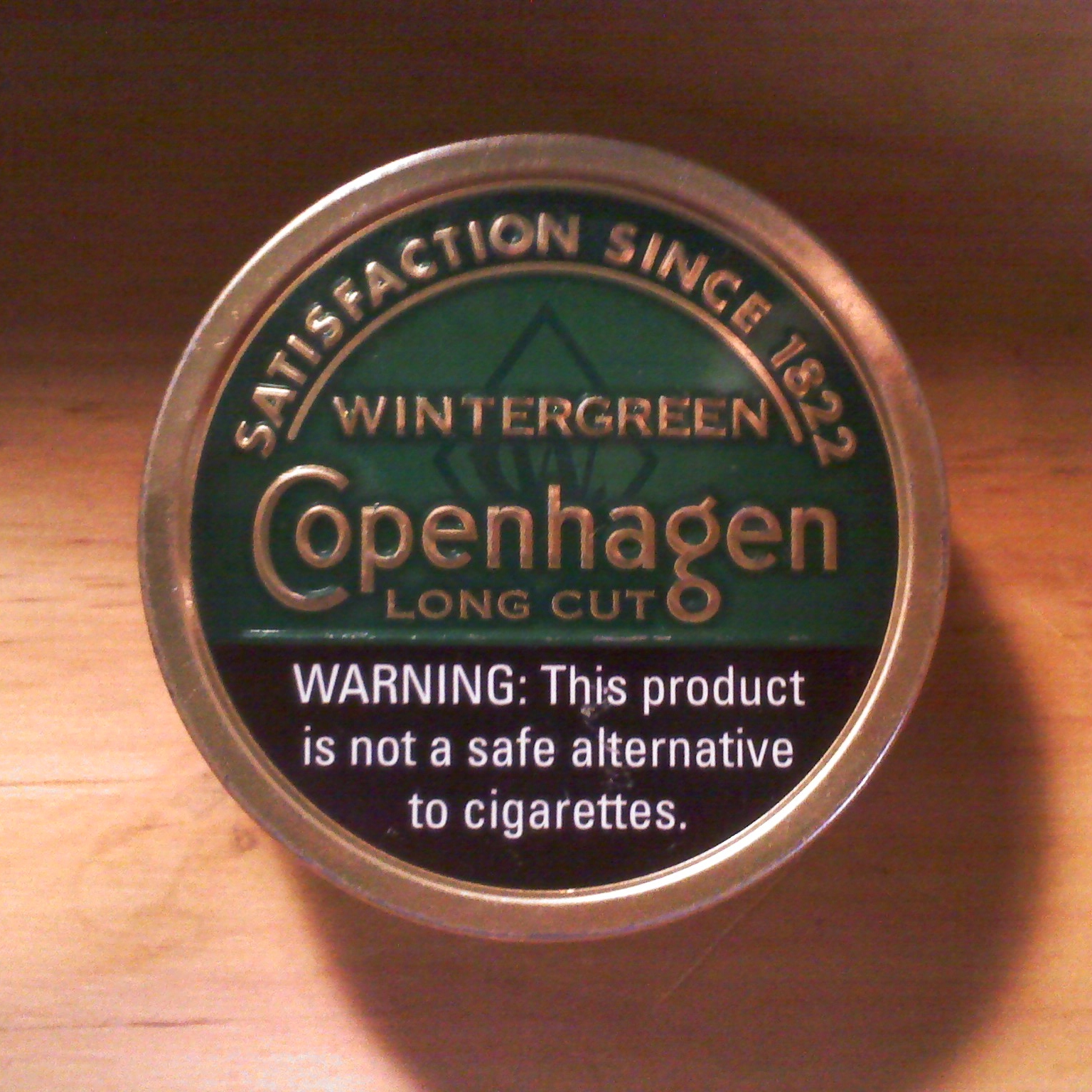
A can of Copenhagen with a warning label

Smokeless tobacco products vary extensively worldwide in both form and health hazards. The level of health risk varies between different types of products (e.g., low nitrosamine Swedish-type snus versus other smokeless tobacco with high nitrosamine levels from South Asia). Even though smokeless tobacco poses a lower health risk than traditional combusted products, contrary to common belief it is not a "safe" alternative to conventional tobacco. There is no safe level of smokeless tobacco use. The declines in smokeless tobacco initiation among adolescents and young adults is particularly relevant to improving their health because smokeless tobacco use is often linked to subsequent cigarette initiation. Smokeless tobacco users can experience negative health consequences at any age. Youth use of tobacco in any form is unsafe.

=== Cancer ===
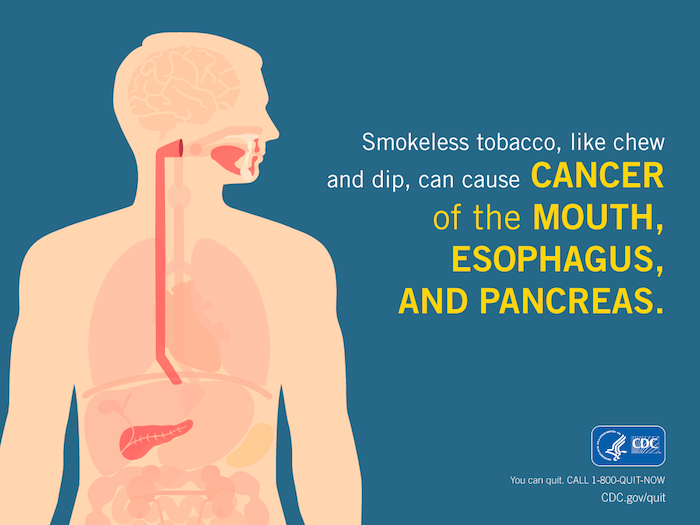
Graphic from the 2016 Centers for Disease Control and Prevention report entitled Smokeless Tobacco: Health Effects

Smokeless tobacco (including products where tobacco is chewed) is a cause of oral cancer, oesophagus cancer, and pancreas cancer. Increased risk of oral cancer caused by smokeless tobacco is present in countries such as the United States but particularly prevalent in Southeast Asian countries where the use of smokeless tobacco is common.

Smokeless tobacco can cause white or gray patches inside the mouth (leukoplakia) that can develop into oral cancer.

==== Carcinogens ====
All tobacco products, including smokeless, contain cancer-causing chemicals. These carcinogenic compounds occurring in smokeless tobacco vary widely, and depend upon the kind of product and how it was manufactured. There are 28 known cancer-causing substances in smokeless tobacco products. Carcinogenic compounds in smokeless tobacco belong primarily to three groups of compounds: tobacco-specific nitrosamines (TSNA), N-nitrosoamino acids and N-nitrosamines. Among these TSNAs are the most abundant in smokeless tobacco and the most carcinogenic. N-nitrosonornicotine and ketone are group 1 carcinogens to humans. These two nitrosamines found in smokeless tobacco products are the main agents for the majority of cancers in smokeless tobacco users. Products such as 3-(methylnitrosamino)-proprionitrile, nitrosamines, and nicotine initiate the production of reactive oxygen species in smokeless tobacco, eventually leading to fibroblast, DNA, and RNA damage with carcinogenic effects in the mouth of tobacco consumers. The metabolic activation of nitrosamine in tobacco by cytochrome P450 enzymes may lead to the formation of N-nitrosonornicotine, a major carcinogen, and micronuclei, which are an indicator of genotoxicity. These effects lead to further DNA damage and, eventually, oral cancer. Other chemicals found in tobacco can also cause cancer. These include the radioactive element polonium-210 found in tobacco fertilizer. Harmful chemicals are also formed when tobacco is cured with heat (polycyclic aromatic hydrocarbons). Furthermore tobacco contains harmful metals such as arsenic, beryllium, cadmium, chromium, cobalt, lead, nickel, and mercury. The amounts of nicotine in saliva from using smokeless tobacco could be at amounts that can be toxic to cells in the oral cavity.

=== Cardiovascular disease ===
Using smokeless tobacco increases the risk of fatal coronary heart disease and stroke. Use of smokeless tobacco also seems to greatly raise the risk of non-fatal ischaemic heart disease among users in Asia, although not in Europe.

=== Effects during pregnancy ===
Smokeless tobacco can cause adverse reproductive effects including stillbirth, premature birth, low birth weight. Nicotine in smokeless tobacco products that are used during pregnancy can affect how a baby's brain develops before birth.

== Management ==
Due to the harm caused by smokeless tobacco, it use might lead to the need for management or treatment. Some medications that show some benefits are varenicline and nicotine lozenges. Some behavioural interventions may also help.

== Prevalence ==
More than 300 million people are using smokeless tobacco worldwide. People of many regions, including India, Pakistan, other Asian countries, and North America, have a long history of smokeless tobacco use. Once addicted to nicotine from smokeless tobacco use, many people, particularly young people, expand their tobacco use by smoking cigarettes. Because young people who use smokeless tobacco can become addicted to nicotine, they may be more likely to also become cigarette smokers. Youth are particularly susceptible to starting smokeless tobacco use.

=== United States ===
Males were more likely than females to have used smokeless tobacco in the past month. In 2014, 3.3 percent of people aged 12 or older (an estimated 8.7 million people) used smokeless tobacco in the past month. Past month smokeless tobacco use remained relatively stable between 2002 and 2014. Past month smokeless tobacco use between 2002 and 2014 was mostly consistent among adults aged 26 or older. There was more variability in the percentages of young adults aged 18 to 25 and adolescents aged 12 to 17 who used smokeless tobacco between 2002 and 2014. Smokeless tobacco use for adolescents aged 12 to 17 was higher during the mid-2000s, but the 2014 estimates were closer to the lower levels seen in the early 2000s. In 2014, an estimated 1.0 million people aged 12 or older used smokeless tobacco for the first time in the past year; this represents 0.5 percent of people who had not previously used smokeless tobacco. Prevalence of smokeless tobacco types that contain areca nut is increasing in the Western Pacific.

In 2016 about 2 of every 100 middle school students in the US (2.2%) reported current use of smokeless tobacco. In 2016 nearly 6 of every 100 high school students in the US (5.8%) reported current use of smokeless tobacco. Nearly a decade later the use of smokeless tobacco decreased significantly. In 2024, the National Youth Tobacco Survey reported current overall smokeless tobacco use of 1.2% among U.S. middle and high school students. In parallel, combustible cigarette use among U.S. students also fell substantially over the last decade. In 2014, current cigarette smoking was 9.2% among high school students and 2.5% among middle school students; by 2024 it declined to 1.7% (high school) and 1.1% (middle school) (overall 1.4% across all students).

More recent studies, documenting tobacco use among adults, have also shown a decrease in the exclusive use of smokeless tobacco. In 2023 it reduced to 1.4%, whereas exclusive cigarette smoking declined to 7.9%.

== Public policy ==
=== WHO FCTC policies ===
The WHO Framework Convention on Tobacco Control (FCTC) contains a set of common goals, minimum standards for tobacco control policy in the 168 countries which signed it. The FCTC policies are also applicable for smokeless tobacco however they are less implemented in regards to these products. Only 57 countries have policies regulating smokeless tobacco use. 13 countries and the European Union apply a ban for advertising and promoting smokeless tobacco. The sale of smokeless tobacco to minors (Article 16 of FCTC) is restricted only in 13 countries and the WHO-defined Eastern Mediterranean region. 11 countries use taxation and pricing measures (Article 6) to reduce use in the general population.

In countries where they are applied to smokeless tobacco, FCTC policies had a positive impact on reducing their use. If multiple policies, including large taxes, are implemented, premature deaths can be prevented. However if taxation is higher for smoking products only people might switch to cheaper alternatives like smokeless tobacco.

=== Banning ===
The manufacture, distribution and sale of smokeless tobacco is banned completely in Bhutan, Singapore, and Sri Lanka. Partial bans on import and sales on some products are in effect in Australia, Bahrain, Brazil, India, Iran, Tanzania, Thailand, New Zealand, the UK and the European Union.

== History ==
Smokeless tobacco was first discussed in the English language in 1683 as a powdered tobacco for breathing into the nose. People have used it for over a thousand years. Cigarette manufacturers have penetrated the smokeless tobacco market.

=== Positions of medical organizations ===
As long ago as 1986, the advisory committee to the Surgeon General concluded that the use of smokeless tobacco "is not a safe substitute for smoking cigarettes. It can cause cancer and a number of noncancerous oral conditions and can lead to nicotine addiction and dependence". According to a 2002 report by the Royal College of Physicians, "As a way of using nicotine, the consumption of non-combustible tobacco is of the order of 10–1,000 times less hazardous than smoking, depending on the product". A panel of experts convened by the National Institutes of Health (NIH) in 2006 stated that the "range of risks, including nicotine addiction, from smokeless tobacco products may vary extensively because of differing levels of nicotine, carcinogens, and other toxins in different products".

In 2010 the National Cancer Institute stated that "because all tobacco products are harmful and cause cancer, the use of all of these products should be strongly discouraged. There is no safe level of tobacco use. People who use any type of tobacco product should be urged to quit". In 2015 the American Cancer Society stated that "Using any kind of spit or smokeless tobacco is a major health risk. It's less lethal than smoking tobacco, but less lethal is a far cry from safe." In 2017 the World Health Organization states that "Smokeless tobacco use is a significant part of the overall world tobacco problem."

== Public perceptions ==
Many people who use smokeless tobacco may think it is safer than smoking, but all tobacco products contain toxicants, and use of smokeless tobacco poses its own significant health risks. In South and South-East Asia these products are considered part of the cultural heritage and there is little enthusiasm for regulation. Around 80% of users live in these regions.

== See also ==
- Herbal cigarette
- Tobacco
- Tobacco usage in sport
- Tobacco packaging warning messages § Smokeless tobacco
