= Enkū Museum =

Museum in Japan

Enkū Museum 円空館
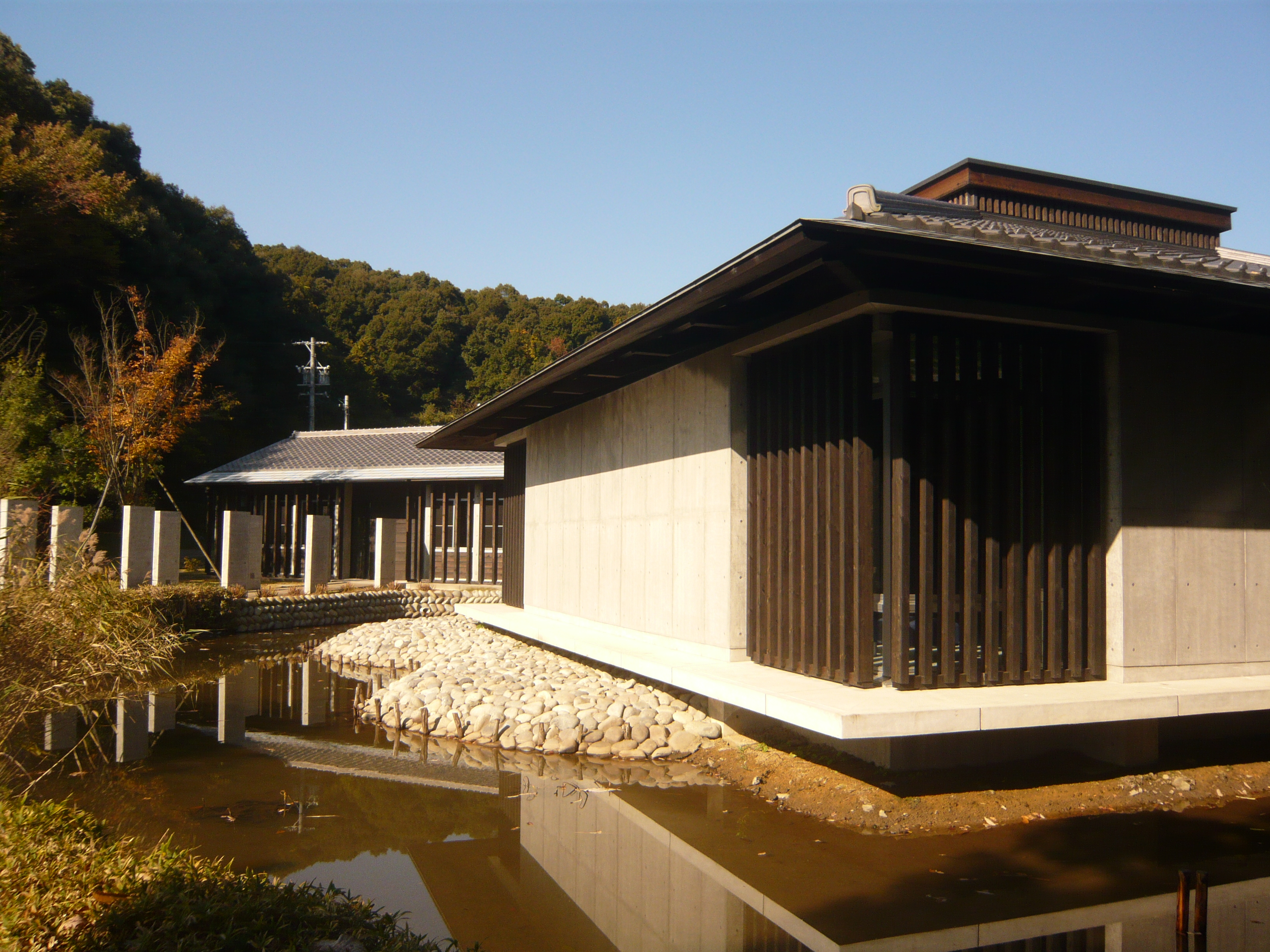
- Enkū Museum
- Interactive map of the Enkū Museum 円空館 area

General information
- Location: 2-30-1 Sakura Honmachi, Seki, Gifu, Japan
- Coordinates: 35°30′21″N 136°53′25″E

Technical details
- Floor area: 308 sq m

Design and construction
- Architecture firm: AXS Satow

Website
- Homepage (in Japanese)

Enkū Museum (円空館, Enkūkan) is a museum dedicated to Japanese monk and sculptor Enkū in the city of Seki, Gifu Prefecture, Japan. Enkū was born in Mino Province, present-day Gifu Prefecture, in 1632 and died in Seki in 1695.

== See also ==
- Japanese sculpture
