= Bishamon =

Bishamon or Bishamonten may refer to:

- Vaiśravaṇa, known in Japan as Bishamonten, a Buddhist deity

== Fiction ==
- Bishamon (Darkstalkers), a living suit of samurai armor in Darkstalkers fighting video games
- Bishamon, an ultimate weapon used by Uesugi Kenshin in the Samurai Warriors Xtreme Legends PlayStation 2 video game
- Bishamonten, a character in the Noragami anime and manga
- Bishamon, a powerful Sage companion to "The Hero" in the Video game Inindo: Way of The Ninja

== Other ==
- Bishamon Station, a railway station in Aomori, Japan
- Bishamon, a pro wrestling tag team
- Lake Bishamon, one of the Goshiki-numa

== See also ==
- Kubera (disambiguation), another name of Vaiśravaṇa
- Camponotus bishamon, a species of carpenter ant
- Ponera bishamon, a species of ant in the genera Ponera
