= Enkū =

Japanese sculptor and monk (1632–1695)

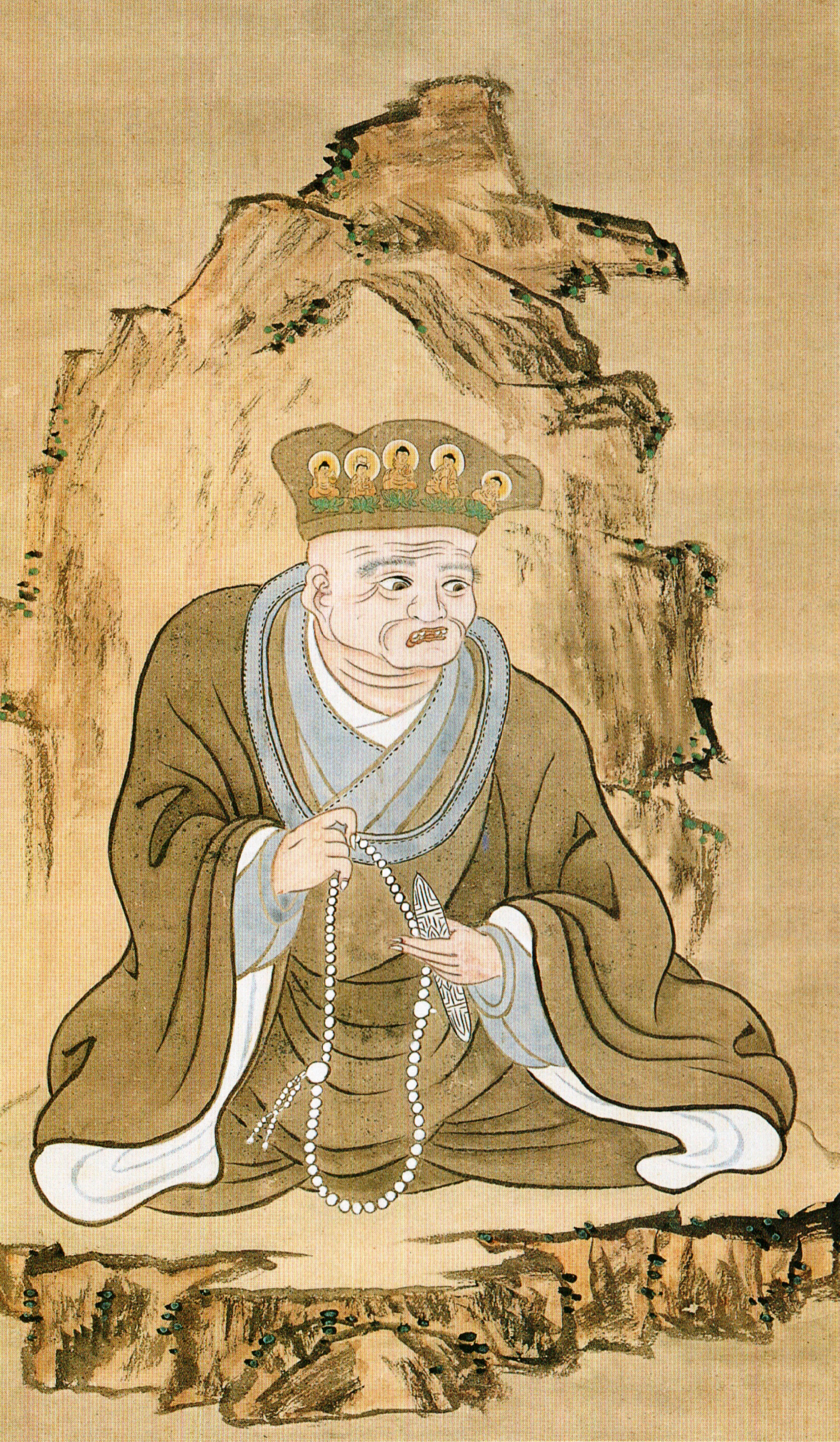

Personal life
- Born: 1632 Mino Province, Japan
- Died: 1695 (aged 62–63) Miroku-ji temple, Seki, Gifu, Japan

Religious life
- Religion: Buddhism
- School: Tendai Jimonshu

Senior posting
- Successor: Encho

Enkū (円空) (1632–1695) was a Japanese Buddhist monk, poet and sculptor during the early Edo period. He was born in Mino Province (present-day Gifu Prefecture) and is famous for carving thousands of wooden statues of the Buddha and other Buddhist icons, many of which were given in payment for lodging on his pilgrimages to temples throughout Japan.

== Biography ==
=== Childhood ===
The most credible source has Enkū born in 1632 on the banks of the Kisogawa in central Japan in Mino Province (present-day Gifu Prefecture). His family was poor and, under the tightly controlled regime of the Tokugawa shōguns, there was little prospect of any kind of advancement. Social status, occupation, even religious affiliation, were rigidly prescribed. Travel was restricted. Tradition recounts that his mother was washed away and drowned in a river flood, probably when he was seven years old.

Soon after this, Enkū left home and became a Buddhist monk. The temple Enkū entered belonged to the Tendai Jimonshu, one of the older branches of Buddhism in Japan. Tendai teaching accepts many ways to realise enlightenment, including the way of the artist – the way of making and distributing Buddha statues. The Jimonshu, or Jimon branch was particularly connected with the yamabushi – literally "those who sleep in the mountains."

=== Yamabushi practice ===
In common with many yamabushi, Enkū was a healer and a practitioner of kampo, herbal medicine. In fact, we still possess some of his personal notes on medicinal plants. As he travelled in remote regions, his skills as a doctor would have been eagerly received among the poorer people.

== Carvings ==
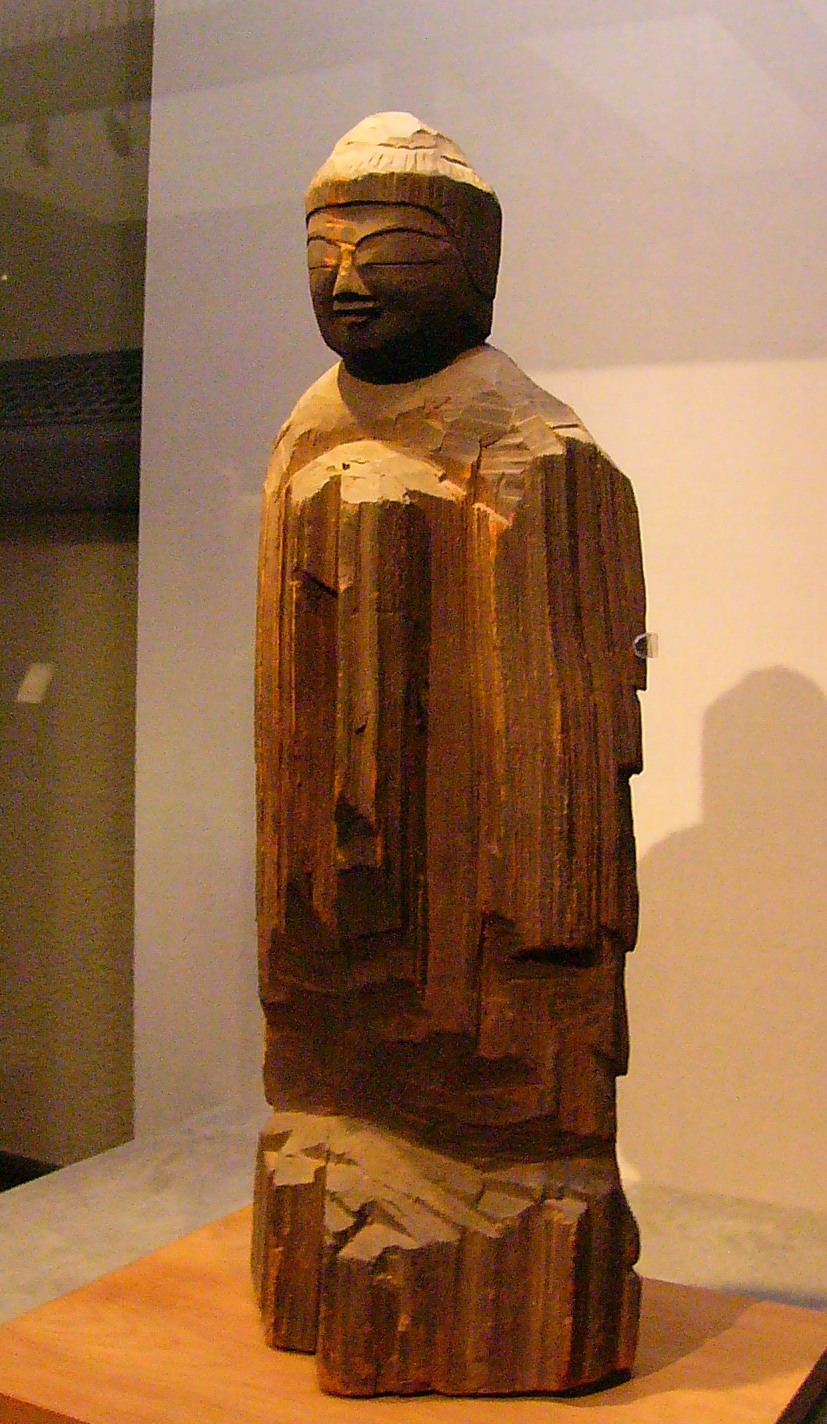
One of Enkū's many carvings

Legend has it that Enkū vowed to carve some 120,000 wooden statues. As of 1976, about 5,000 pieces by Enkū had been found, but new carvings were regularly being discovered. No two were alike. Many of the statues were crudely carved from tree stumps or scrap wood with a few strokes of a hatchet. Some were given to comfort those who had lost family members, others to guide the dying on their journeys to the next life. Thousands of these wooden statues remain today all over Japan, especially in Hida and Gifu regions. Enkū is probably now regarded as one of the most famous Japanese sculptors.

== Poetry ==
There are extant over 1,500 of Enku's Japanese poems in two collections along with a few more written on the back of statues. One collection of 100 poems is called, "Kesa Niji Hyaku Shu" (“One Hundred Poems Containing the Two Characters Kesa). The other which is much larger is called "Otoko Warashi Uta (“Male Child Songs”). Mostly he wrote waka (also known as “tanka”), an ancient five-line verse form with the syllables running usually, 5-7-5-7-7. Themes include his mountain practice, responses to nature and the seasons, romantic pieces and expressions of joy and bliss (he nicknamed himself Kanki Shamon Enku, "Bliss-monk Enku"). In 2015, a book called "In Heaven's River: Poems and Carvings of Mountain-Monk Enku" was published by Zenways Press in the UK with Japanese and English translations of 100 of Enkū's poems collected together by Enkū’s thirtieth-generation successor, Enju-sensei, together with photos of many of his carvings.

== See also ==
- Enkū Museum
