= Kuber (tobacco) =

Smokeless tobacco product popular in East Africa

Kuber is a smokeless tobacco product, known for its highly addictive properties and its unique presentation disguised as a mouth freshener. It originated in India and has gained attention for its widespread use and impact on public health in various countries, including Uganda. In Uganda, the WHO has cited Kuber among ‘new and emerging’ tobacco/nicotine products affecting youth. In Kenya, a 2025 NACADA publication summarizing a February 2025 survey of 15,678 university students reported Kuber at 23% among substances used by students.

== Composition ==
The product is typically sold in small sachets, with contents resembling tea leaves. This deceptive packaging has contributed to its accessibility and misuse. Kuber is known for its high nicotine content, making it more potent and addictive than traditional cigarettes. Users commonly add it to tea or consume it directly by placing a pinch under the lower lip.

== Effects on health ==
Kuber's high nicotine content raises significant health concerns, including:

- Cardiovascular changes
- Vascular constriction
- Addiction
- Cancer
- Leukoplakia
- Gum damage
- Sensory impairment
- Tooth loss

Withdrawal from kuber can result in cravings and changes in mood and appetite.

== Legal status and regulation ==
The legal status of kuber varies by region. In some countries, its sale and distribution, especially under the guise of a mouth freshener, have led to legal scrutiny and regulatory measures. For instance, in Uganda, the government has taken steps to ban the use of kuber due to its impact on public health, particularly among youth. The governments of Malawi and Tanzania also banned the manufacture, import, sale, and consumption of kuber. Despite efforts to ban kuber in Kenya, it remains popular, particularly in Nairobi and Mombasa counties.

== Societal impact ==
The widespread use of kuber, especially among young people in high schools and colleges, has raised societal concerns. Its addictive nature and the ease of access have led to a rise in nicotine addiction among adolescents, with implications for long-term public health and social dynamics.
