= Philip Morris Pakistan =

Pakistani tobacco manufacturing company

- Formerly: Lakson Tobacco Company (1969–2011)
- Type: Subsidiary
- Traded as: PSX: PMPK (1971–2025)
- Industry: Tobacco
- Founded: 1969; 57 years ago
- Headquarters: Karachi, Pakistan
- Products: Cigarettes
- Revenue: ▼ Rs. 18.219 billion (US$65 million) (2023)
- Operating income: ▼ Rs. 1.046 billion (US$3.7 million) (2023)
- Net income: ▼ Rs. 323.663 million (US$1.2 million) (2023)
- Total assets: ▲ Rs. 30.534 billion (US$110 million) (2023)
- Total equity: ▲ Rs. 15.594 billion (US$56 million) (2023)
- Owner: Philip Morris International (97.65%)
- Number of employees: 644 (2023)
- Parent: Philip Morris International
- Website: www.pmi.com/markets/pakistan/en/about-us/overview
- Footnotes; Financials as of 31 December 2023

Philip Morris Pakistan, formerly known as Lakson Tobacco Company, is a Pakistani tobacco manufacturing company that is a subsidiary of Philip Morris International. It is headquartered in Karachi, Pakistan. The company is involved in the manufacturing and sale of cigarettes and tobacco products.

It is the second-largest tobacco company in Pakistan, after Pakistan Tobacco Company.

== History ==
=== 1969–2011: Lakson Tobacco Company ===
Philip Morris Pakistan was founded in 1969 as a joint venture between Lakson Group, Philip Morris International, and Rothmans International. It was then known as Lakson Tobacco Company as 51 percent of the shareholding was held by the Lakhani family. Two years later, in 1971, it was listed on the Karachi Stock Exchange. Commercial production began on August 18, 1971, with capacity to make 1.2 billion cigarettes a year on a single shift. The company's first factory was at Kotri in Sindh, and a second opened in Karachi in 1976. By 1978, it had commissioned a tobacco redrying plant and announced plans for a cigarette factory at Ismaila in the North-West Frontier Province. In 1982 and 1983, it merged two wholly owned subsidiaries into the company, a tobacco threshing and redrying business in Mardan and Punjab Cigarette Industries of Sahiwal.

In the 1980s, Lakson sold 30 percent of its shares to Rothmans International, a British company. In 1984, it accounted for 37 percent of Pakistan's cigarette exports, 65 percent of which went to Afghanistan. In 1985, Lakson sold about 10 billion cigarettes, giving it 25.7 percent of the Pakistani market. Its Morven Gold brand copied the red and gold colours of Gold Leaf packs and was pitched at smokers who wanted Gold Leaf but found it too expensive. The Lakhanis lost a 1984 bid for Premier Tobacco Industries, in which Philip Morris had held an interest since 1967, to the Hashwani family. In 1987, the Hashwanis sold their 38 percent of Premier to the Lakson Group, which then controlled 49 percent of Premier's equity.

In 1993, Morven Gold was promoted with "The Rhythm of Unity", a television commercial filmed mainly at the Lahore Fort on a budget of about one million rupees, then the most expensive commercial made in Pakistan. Cigarette advertisements could only be shown after 10 p.m., but because the commercial did not show the product it was also broadcast during the day.

In 1997, Premier Tobacco was merged into Lakson Tobacco Company. Premier Tobacco was founded in 1952 by SA Samad as a joint venture with Philip Morris and Rothmans International, and was listed on the Karachi Stock Exchange in 1955.

In October 2004, a PMI subsidiary bought another 20 percent of Lakson Tobacco for US$60 million, raising its holding to 40 percent. In 2007, Philip Morris International increased its shareholding in the company to 97 percent. During riots on December 27–29, 2007, the company was a target of looting and arson. It later said that a factory had been destroyed and would close, with its workers laid off, and it filed insurance claims of Rs275 million for damage to property, plant and equipment. The company was renamed Philip Morris (Pakistan) Limited on February 25, 2011.

=== 2011–present: Philip Morris Pakistan ===
In 2012, Philip Morris cut back production at its smallest factory, at Mandra near Rawalpindi, which had depended on ten-cigarette packs, a format that a 2010 regulation had effectively banned. It stopped making cigarettes at Mandra in February 2015 and shifted the output to its factories in Sahiwal and Kotri. In November 2015, it laid off 141 employees from its leaf buying and processing operations.

In 2019, Philip Morris closed Kotri plant in order to restructure their finances. As a result, 193 employees lost their job.

== Operations ==
Philip Morris is based in Clifton, Karachi. In 2023, it had one cigarette factory, in Sahiwal, Punjab, and a green leaf threshing plant in Mardan, Khyber Pakhtunkhwa. The Sahiwal factory also packages Zyn nicotine pouches. Until 1991, the company also operated a factory in Mardan, but it was closed due to the rise of smuggling. By 1996, the company had an installed capacity to produce 18.76 billion cigrattes in three factories located in Dadu, Karachi, and Sahiwal.

Philip Morris buys flue-cured Virginia tobacco from farmers in Khyber Pakhtunkhwa, and together with Pakistan Tobacco Company it purchases most of the province's crop of that variety, largely from growers who hold contracts with the two firms.

Its main premium brand is Marlboro, and its lower-priced brands include Morven Gold, L&M, Diplomat, Red & White and K-2. It also sells Parliament and Royals cigarettes.

== See also ==
- Tobacco industry in Pakistan
