= List of cricketers in Wills' Cigarettes Cricketers, 1928 =

1928 Cricketers
- Header on cards back
- Type: Illustrated cigarette card
- Company: Imperial Tobacco Co.
- Country: United Kingdom
- Availability: 1928–1928
- Features: Cricket players

The Wills' 1928 cricketers was a set of trading cards issued by the Imperial Tobacco Co. under its W.D. & H.O. Wills brand. It consisted of a series of 50 collectable cigarette cards to commemorate leading first-class cricketers who had played county cricket in the 1927 English cricket season; and including nine who had toured South Africa in 1927–28 with the Marylebone Cricket Club team. This set is now a collectible and, in mint condition, has an estimated value (2017) of £90.

== Overview ==
47 of the players chosen for the series, including the three who played for Glamorgan, were English. The three exceptions were the Australian Test fast bowler Ted McDonald; the Indian-born batsman Duleepsinhji, though he later played for England; and Douglas Jardine, who was born in India of Scottish parents. One player, Roy Kilner, had died in April 1928 just a few weeks before publication. Most of the players in the series were veterans in 1928, only ten being under 30. The oldest player was Wilfred Rhodes, aged 50; the youngest was Duleepsinhji, aged 22.

All of the seventeen county clubs then taking part in the County Championship are represented in the series. Six clubs—Kent, Lancashire, Middlesex, Nottinghamshire, Surrey, and Yorkshire—have four players each; the lowest number is Worcestershire with one.

Each card has a 1–50 series number determined alphabetically by surname. All players are named on the front and back of the card by initials preceding surname. Only J. W. Hearne was generally known by his initials. There is an artist's impression of each player on the front of the card; seventeen are portraits and 33 depict the player in action. In the card captions, those players who had amateur status were prefixed "Mr." or, in two cases, "Hon.". All such titles are excluded from this list.

== Series information ==
=== Key ===
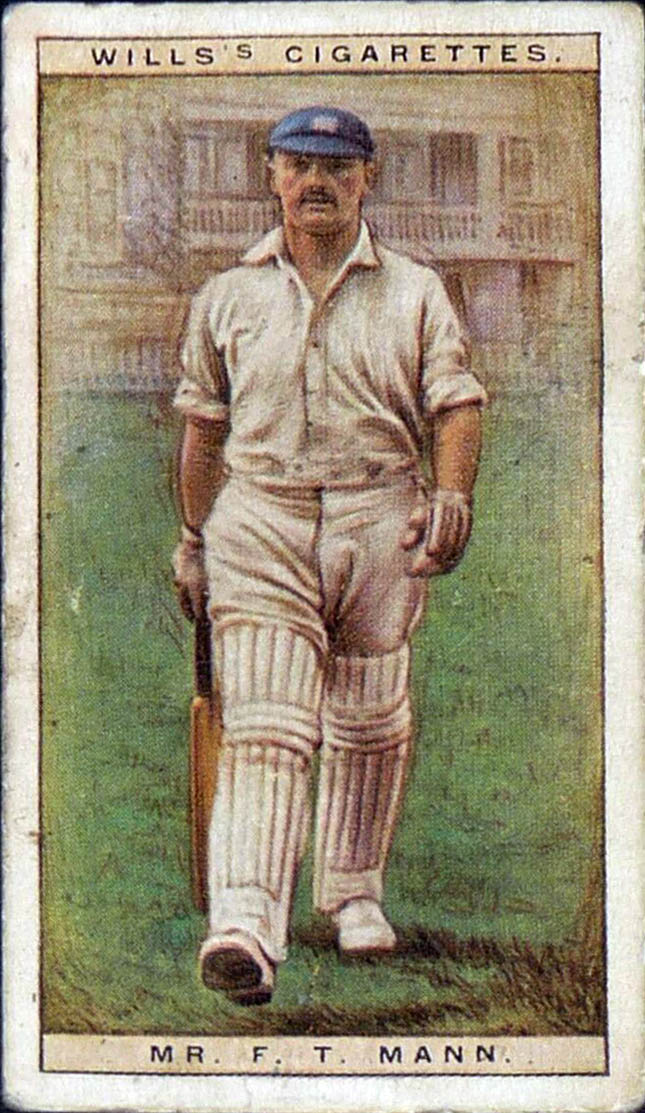
Frank Mann displayed on the #31 card

- # – card number in series (i.e., 1–50)
- **Player** – the name by which the player was generally known; the names on the cards include several significant errors, especially Nobby Clark and Ted McDonald; also, the cards used titles like "Hon." and "Mr" for amateurs, and these have been ignored.
  - **Player's name in bold** – the player took part in Test cricket during his career; with the exception of McDonald, who was Australian, all the Test players represented England.
- **Club** – generally, the first-class club(s) whom the player represented in 1927 and was expected to represent in 1928; the cumulative ordinals per county indicate the number of times each county occurs in the set.
- **Age** – the player's age at 28 April 1928, the opening day of the first-class season; Roy Kilner's age is at 5 April 1928, the date of his death.
- **Type** – an amalgam of initialisms (see below) which describe the player's style of batting and bowling (some players are specialist batsmen); and (if appropriate) wicket-keeper.
- **RHB** – right-handed batsman
- **LHB** – left-handed batsman
- **WK** – wicket-keeper
- **RF** – right-arm fast bowler
- **LF** – left-arm fast bowler
- **RFM** – right-arm fast medium bowler
- **LFM** – left-arm fast bowler
- **RM** – right-arm medium pace bowler
- **LM** – left-arm medium pace bowler
- **LB** – right-arm leg break bowler
- **OB** – right-arm off break bowler
- **SLA** – orthodox slow left-arm spin bowler
- **picture** – confirms the card picture as a portrait or states the type of action being depicted
- notes – includes a summary of the "pen picture" on the back of the card
- **WY ccyy** – year in which the player was elected a Wisden Cricketer of the Year (i.e., the year of the Wisden issue)

== Checklist ==
#	Player	Club	Age	Type	Picture	Notes
1	Ewart Astill	Leicestershire (1/2)	40	RHB/OB	portrait	WY 1933. Toured South Africa in 1927–28 with the Marylebone Cricket Club (MCC) team. Wills says that Astill had been Leicestershire's best batsman since the end of the war, describing him as "sound and steady", noted for hitting hard in front of the wicket.
2	William Bates	Glamorgan (1/3)	44	RHB/SLA	batting	
3	George Brown	Hampshire (1/3)	40	LHB/WK	portrait	
4	Freddie Calthorpe	Warwickshire (1/3)	35	RHB/RM	batting	
5	Percy Chapman	Kent (1/4)	27	LHB/LM/SLA	batting	WY 1919.
6	Nobby Clark	Northamptonshire (1/2)	25	LHB/LF	portrait	On the Wills card, Clark's initials are given as "E. C.", but that is a publication error. His full name was Edward Winchester Clark and he was universally known as Nobby Clark.
7	Alfred Dipper	Gloucestershire (1/3)	42	RHB/RM	batting	
8	Johnny Douglas	Essex (1/2)	45	RHB/RFM	bowling	WY 1915.
9	George Duckworth	Lancashire (1/4)	26	RHB/WK	portrait	WY 1929.
10	Duleepsinhji	Cambridge University & Sussex (1/3)	22	RHB/LB	portrait	WY 1930. Like his uncle, Ranjitsinhji, Duleepsinhji was usually called "Kumar Sri" and given the initials "K. S." on scorecards. This is actually incorrect usage because "Kumar" and "Sri" are both honorary titles. On the Wills card, "K. S. Duleepsinhji" is the style used.
11	Guy Earle	Somerset (1/2)	36	RHB/RF	portrait	
12	Percy Fender	Surrey (1/4)	35	RHB/RM/LB	batting	WY 1915.
13	Tich Freeman	Kent (2/4)	39	RHB/LB	bowling	WY 1923. Toured South Africa in 1927–28 with the MCC team.
14	George Geary	Leicestershire (2/2)	34	RHB/RFM	fielding	WY 1927. Toured South Africa in 1927–28 with the MCC team.
15	Arthur Gilligan	Sussex (2/3)	33	RHB/RF	batting	WY 1924.
16	George Gunn	Nottinghamshire (1/4)	48	RHB/RM	batting	WY 1914.
17	Charlie Hallows	Lancashire (2/4)	33	LHB/SLA	batting	WY 1928.
18	Wally Hammond	Gloucestershire (2/3)	24	RHB/RFM	batting	WY 1928. Toured South Africa in 1927–28 with the MCC team.
19	Wally Hardinge	Kent (3/4)	42	RHB/SLA	batting	WY 1915.
20	J. W. Hearne	Middlesex (1/4)	37	RHB/LB	batting	WY 1912. Hearne is the only player in the set who was generally known by his initials, and so his card's caption is the only one that is strictly correct.
21	Patsy Hendren	Middlesex (2/4)	39	RHB/OB	batting	WY 1920. Named "E. Hendren" on the Wills card, his full name was Elias Henry Hendren. He was universally known as "Patsy" Hendren.
22	Jack Hobbs	Surrey (2/4)	45	RHB/RM	batting	WY 1909 & 1926.
23	Percy Holmes	Yorkshire (1/4)	41	RHB/RM	batting	WY 1920. Toured South Africa in 1927–28 with the MCC team.
24	Guy Jackson	Derbyshire (1/2)	31	LHB	portrait	
25	Douglas Jardine	Surrey (3/4)	27	RHB/LB	batting	WY 1928.
26	Vallance Jupp	Northamptonshire (2/2)	37	RHB/RM/OB	batting	WY 1928.
27	Roy Kilner	Yorkshire (2/4)	37	LHB/SLA	bowling	WY 1924. Roy Kilner died on 5 April 1928, a few weeks before publication.
28	Harold Larwood	Nottinghamshire (2/4)	23	RHB/RF	portrait	WY 1927.
29	Ben Lilley	Nottinghamshire (3/4)	34	RHB/WK	portrait	
30	Ted McDonald	Lancashire (3/4)	37	RHB/RF	bowling	WY 1922. On the Wills card, McDonald's name is incorrectly spelled "Macdonald".
31	Frank Mann	Middlesex (3/4)	40	RHB	batting	
32	Phil Mead	Hampshire (2/3)	41	LHB/SLA	portrait	WY 1912.
33	Jack Mercer	Glamorgan (2/3)	35	RHB/RFM	portrait	WY 1927.
34	Charlie Parker	Gloucestershire (3/3)	45	RHB/SLA	portrait	WY 1923.
35	Wilfred Rhodes	Yorkshire (3/4)	50	RHB/SLA	bowling	WY 1899.
36	Fred Root	Worcestershire (1/1)	38	RHB/RFM	portrait	
37	Jack Russell	Essex (2/2)	41	RHB/RM	batting	WY 1923. During his career, Russell was always known as Albert Charles Russell but his real name, discovered much later, was Charles Albert George Russell. Even so, he was universally known as "Jack" Russell.
38	Frank Ryan	Glamorgan (3/3)	39	LHB/SLA	portrait	Named "F. Ryan" on the Wills card, his full name was Francis Peter Ryan. Although Ryan was English, he was born in India.
39	Andy Sandham	Surrey (4/4)	37	RHB	batting	WY 1923.
40	Tiger Smith	Warwickshire (2/3)	42	RHB/WK	keeping wicket	This is the only picture in the series with landscape format page orientation.
41	Greville Stevens	Middlesex (4/4)	27	RHB/LB	batting	Toured South Africa in 1927–28 with the MCC team.
42	Herbert Sutcliffe	Yorkshire (4/4)	33	RHB/RM	batting	WY 1920. Toured South Africa in 1927–28 with the MCC team.
43	Maurice Tate	Sussex (3/3)	32	RHB/RFM	bowling	WY 1924.
44	Lionel Tennyson	Hampshire (3/3)	38	RHB/RF	portrait	WY 1914.
45	Leslie Townsend	Derbyshire (2/2)	24	RHB/RM/OB	portrait	WY 1934. Named "L. Townsend" on the Wills card, his full name was Leslie Fletcher Townsend.
46	Ernest Tyldesley	Lancashire (4/4)	39	RHB/RM	batting	WY 1920. Toured South Africa in 1927–28 with the MCC team. Named "E. Tyldesley" on the Wills card, his full name was George Ernest Tyldesley.
47	Jack White	Somerset (2/2)	37	RHB/SLA	bowling	WY 1929.
48	Dodger Whysall	Nottinghamshire (4/4)	40	RHB/RM	batting	WY 1925. Named "W. Whysall" on the Wills card, his full name was William Wilfrid Whysall. He was widely known by his nickname "Dodger".
49	Frank Woolley	Kent (4/4)	40	LHB/LM/SLA	batting	WY 1911.
50	Bob Wyatt	Warwickshire (3/3)	26	RHB/RM	portrait	WY 1930. Toured South Africa in 1927–28 with the MCC team. Wills describes Wyatt as "probably Warwickshire's best all-rounder" and as "a polished batsman of sound defence".

== Bibliography ==
- Wills, W. D. & H. O. (1928). Wills' Cigarettes Cricketers, 1928 – a series of 50. Imperial Tobacco Co. (GB & Ireland) Ltd.
