= Classic (cigarette) =

Indian cigarette brand

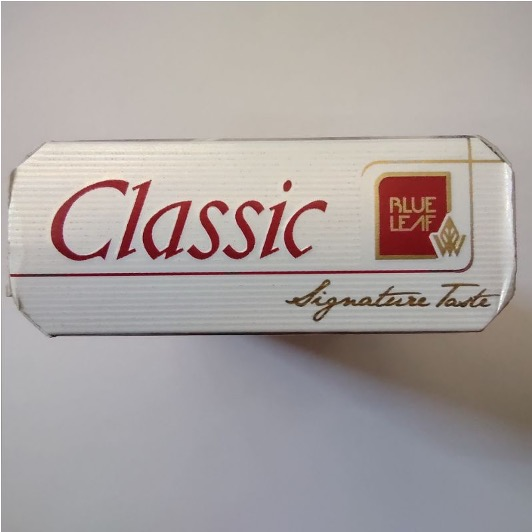
- An Indian pack of Wills Classic Milds cigarettes with a picture warning
- Product type: Cigarette
- Current owner: ITC Limited in India, Imperial Tobacco outside of India
- Produced by: ITC Limited in India, Imperial Tobacco outside of India
- Country: India
- Introduced: 1979; 47 years ago
- Related brands: Classic Blue Leaf, Classic Rich Taste (formerly Classic Regular), Classic Balanced Taste (Formerly Classic Milds), Classic Refined taste (formerly Classic Ultra Milds), Classic Ice-burst, Classic Double Burst, Classic Low Smell, Classic Verve, Classic Connect.
- Markets: See Markets
- Previous owners: W.D. & H.O. Wills
- Tagline: "Live Your Passion, Discover a passion, For Those Who Value Taste"

Wills Classic (or Imperial Classic as it is known in some countries) is a range of cigarettes in India, currently owned and manufactured by ITC Limited. Outside of India, it is manufactured by Imperial Tobacco.

== Overview ==
Classic Filter Kings is a cigarette brand with a number of variants. The first Classic variant was launched in India by ITC Limited in 1979. At the time the Indian cigarette market was mainly dominated by plain and Regular Size Filter Tipped products, with king size contributing barely 5% of the total market.

== History ==
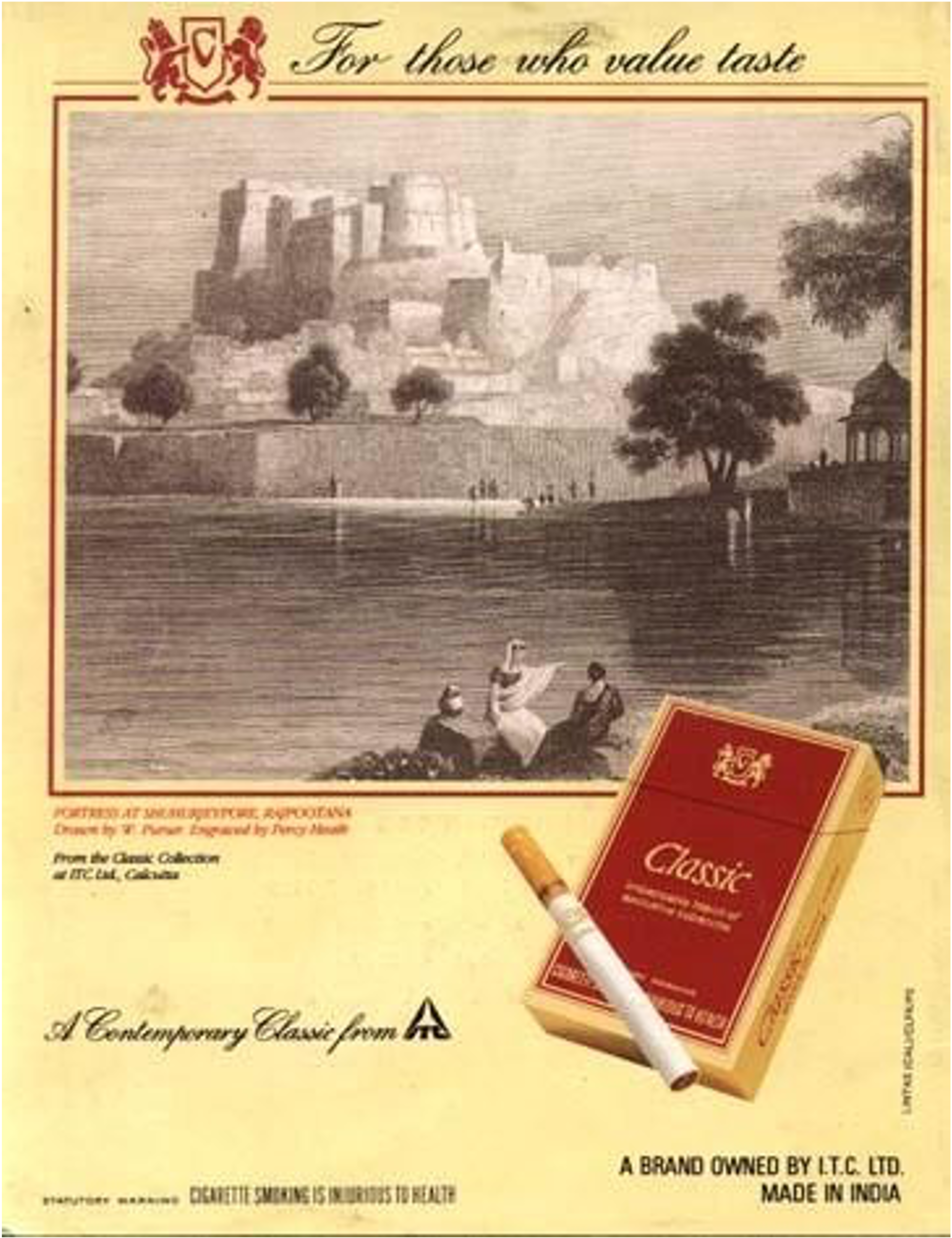
Advertisement – Classic Filter Kings circa 1979

Classic was launched in 1979 and advertised as a premium brand. It became popular in the metro areas in India, especially in the north and in the east.

=== 1990s ===
During the late 1990s, the image was changed to become more global. The cigarette size was increased from 83mm to 84mm and the diameter from 24.5mm to 24.75mm. The paper quality was also improved. Classic Ultra Milds were introduced in 1997 The different brand variants were sold in packages with different colors.

The brand was connected to sponsorships including racing and golf. These were targeted at Westernised affluent smokers of the SEC A category. In 1996, the company began to incorporate music in their advertising, producing limited edition music packs, as well as other limited edition packs on the themes of polo and racing.

=== 2000s ===
In the 2000s, ITC Limited launched new variants, including the slimmed version Classic Verve, as well as cigarette flavoured with menthol, lemon, or tea.

In 2015, the company started producing capsule cigarettes, which contained a capsule that added an extra flavour to the cigarette. In 2016, the brand launched an innovation called Classic Low Smell

== Markets ==
Wills Classic is mainly sold in India, but has also been sold internationally. With a variety of brands under the Classic, Wills, Scissors and ACE Umbrella Trademarks. ITC has cemented its international standing being the 3rd largest player in the countries of Bahrain & Qatar. ITC was also the first company to introduce a flavour-on-demand (capsule) product in the economy industry segment in the West Asia region.

== Products ==
Classic brands marketed in India include

- Classic Rich Taste (formerly Classic Regular)
- Classic Balanced Taste (Formerly Classic Milds)
- Classic Refined taste (formerly Classic Ultra Milds)
- Classic Blue Leaf
- Classic Verve
- Classic Verve Low Smell
- Classic Ice-burst
- Classic Double Burst
- Classic Low Smell
- Classic Connect
- Classic Icon

== See also ==
- Tobacco smoking
