= Video synopsis =

Approach to create a short video summary of a long video

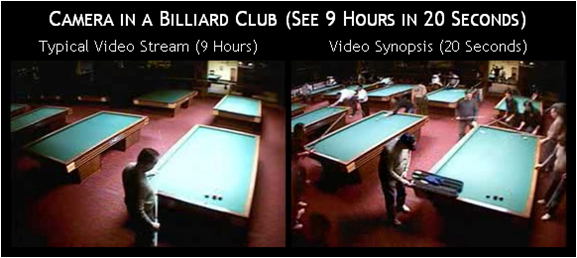
Video synopsis example: 9 hours of activity summarized in a 20-second simultaneous presentation of multiple objects and activities that occurred at different times.

Video synopsis is a method for automatically synthesizing a short, informative summary of a video. Unlike traditional video summarization, the synopsis is not just composed of frames from the original video. The algorithm detects, tracks and analyzes moving objects (also called events) in a database of objects and activities. The final output is a new, short video clip in which objects and activities that originally occurred at different times are displayed simultaneously, so as to convey information in the shortest possible time. Video synopsis has specific applications in the field of video analytics and video surveillance where, despite technological advancements and increased growth in the deployment of CCTV (closed circuit television) cameras, viewing and analysis of recorded footage is still a costly labor-intensive and time-intensive task.

== Technology overview ==
Video synopsis combines a visual summary of stored video together with an indexing mechanism.

When a summary is required, all objects from the target period are collected and shifted in time to create a much shorter synopsis video showing maximum activity. A synopsis video clip is generated, in real time, in which objects and activities that originally occurred in different times are displayed simultaneously.

Tube packing – Schematic example: Creating the video summary by re-timing the space-time tubes, (X represents the 2-dimensional XY axis of each frame).

The process begins by detecting and tracking objects of interest. Each object is represented as a tube in space-time of all video frames. Objects are detected and stored in a database in approximately real time.

Following a request to summarize a time period, all objects from the desired time are extracted from the database, and indexed to create a much shorter summary video containing maximum activity.

Real time rendering is used to generate the summary video after object re-timing. This allows end-user control over object/event density.

Video synopsis technology was invented by Prof. Shmuel Peleg of the Hebrew University of Jerusalem, and is being developed under commercial license by Milestone Systems. Originally, BriefCam Ltd. received a license to use the technology from Yissum, the owner of the patents registered for the technology. In May 2018, BriefCam was acquired by Japanese digital imaging giant, Canon Inc., for an estimated $90 million. Investors in the company include Motorola Solutions Venture Capital, Aviv Venture Capital, and OurCrowd. Subsequently, BriefCam and the video synopsis technology was acquired by Milestone Systems (another standalone company owned by Canon) in 2024.

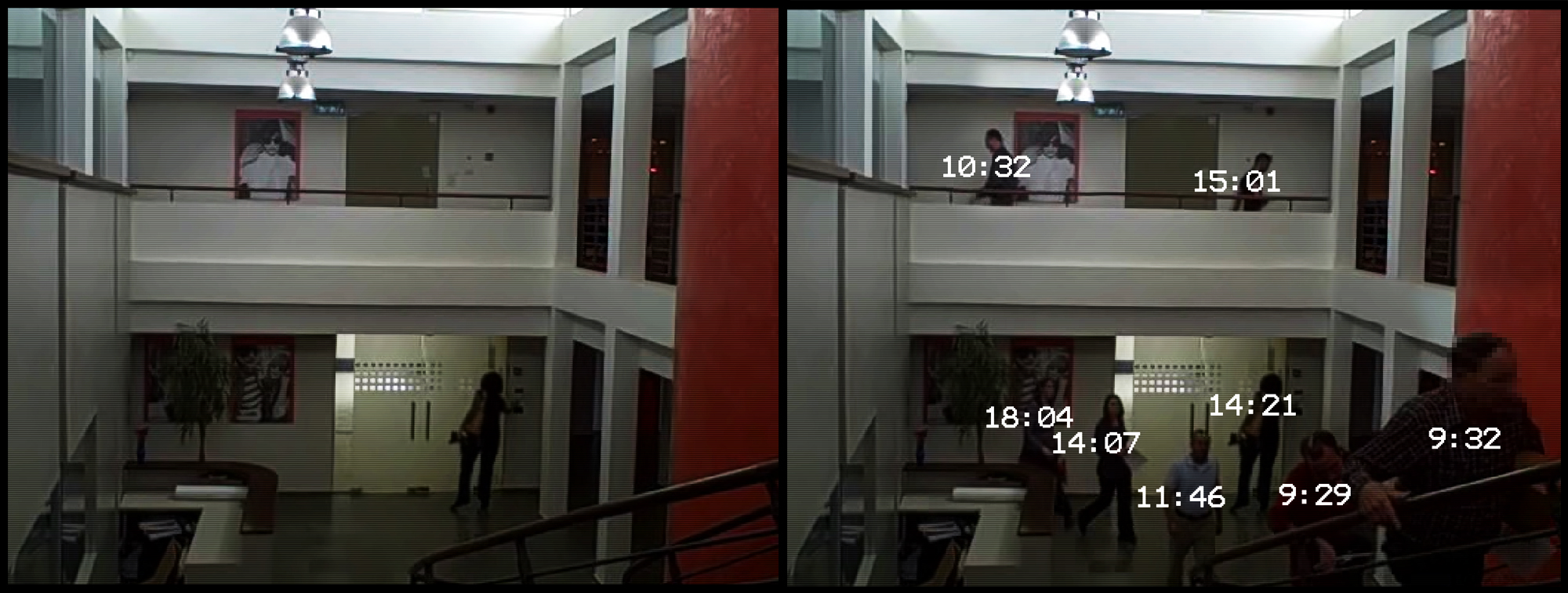
Another video synopsis example

== Recent advances ==
Recent advances in the field of video synopsis have resulted in methods that focus in collecting key-points(or frames) from the long uncut video and presenting them as a chain of key events that summarize the video. This is only one of the many methods employed in modern literature to perform this task. Recently, these event-driven methods have focused on correlating objects in frames, but in a more semantically related way that has been called a story-driven method of summarizing video. These methods have been shown to work well for egocentric settings where the video is basically a point-of-view perspective of a single person or a group of people.

== Classification ==
Video synopsis techniques have a number of standardized properties in common, which can be quantified as follows: (a) the video synopsis should contain the maximum activity with the least redundancy; (b) the chronological order and spatial consistency of objects in space and time must be preserved; (c) in the resultant synopsis video, there must be minimal collision; and (d) the synopsis video must be smooth and able to permit viewing without losing the region of interest.

1. Keyframe-Based Synopsis
2. Object-Based Synopsis
3. Action-Based Synopsis
4. Collision Graph-Based Synopsis
5. Abnormal Content-Based Synopsis

== See also ==
- ActionShot
- Video content analysis

== Patents ==
- US Patent 8,311,277 - Method and System for Video Indexing and Video Synopsis. Also Australian Patent AU2007345938. Filed in 9 additional countries
- US Patent 8,102,406 - Method and System for Producing a Video Synopsis. Also European Patent EP1955205 and Japanese Patent JP4972095. Filed in 7 additional countries
- US Patent 7,852,370 - Method and System for Spatio-Temporal Video Warping. Also Israeli Patent IL182006. Filed in Europe: PCT/IL2005/001150
- The owner of the patents are Yissum which gave a License to BriefCam to use the technology.
