= Wills Building =

Landmark in Newcastle upon Tyne, England

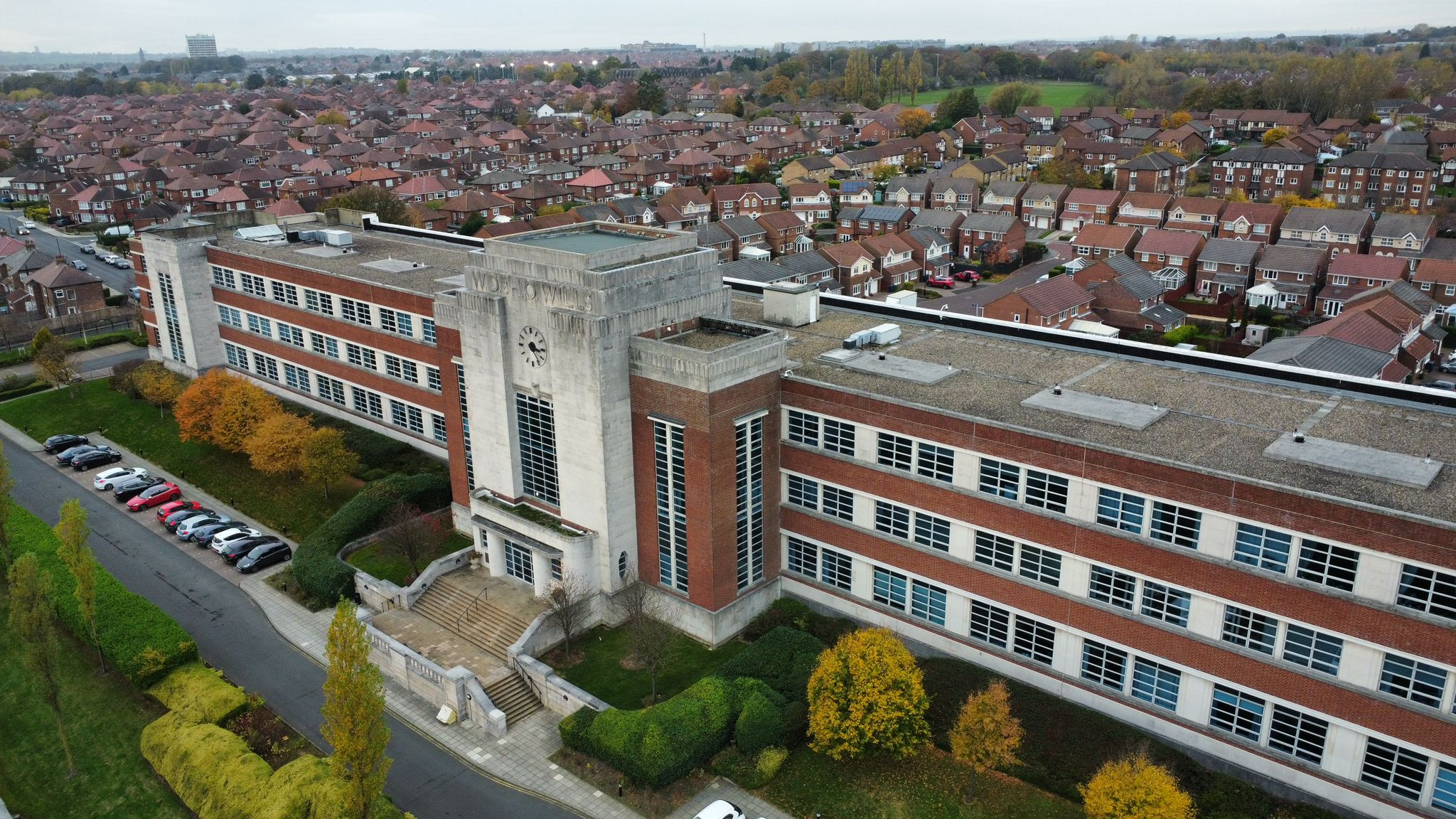

- Location in Tyne and Wear

General information
- Location: Tyne and Wear, England, UK
- Coordinates: 54.996°N 1.562°W
- OS grid: NZ280669

The Wills Building is a well-known landmark in Newcastle upon Tyne. It was built in the Art Deco style as a cigarette factory in the late 1940s for W. D. & H. O. Wills. It is situated on the New Coast Road from Newcastle upon Tyne to the Billy Mill roundabout in North Shields, and overlooks the Wallsend golf course. It was originally built with the office block facing onto the New Coast Road with the factory itself forming the wings and rear of the building, making the whole factory complex into a pair of quadrangles. The complex included a theatre and leisure facilities for the staff.

After the factory closed in 1986 it stood empty for a number of years. During this period it was a sad sight with windows smashed by vandals, but the front section of the building could not be demolished, having gained Grade II listed status in November 1986. Many local people thought it should be redeveloped and various schemes were put forward, including conversion into a hotel, but none of these came to fruition. The rear sections of the factory complex were demolished at around this time as the buildings were too impregnated with nicotine to be cost-effectively restored. The main building was converted into luxury residential apartments by George Wimpey, with its exterior and stonework carefully restored. It was officially reopened as The Wills Building in November 1999. Modern housing was built on the brownfield land to the rear.

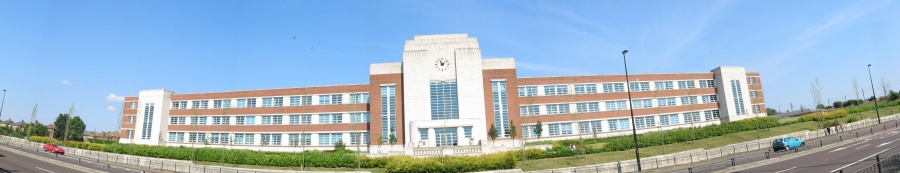

The Wills Building is featured in "Newcastle + Gateshead Architecture And Heritage" by Faulkner, Beacock and Jones (page 286, ISBN 1-904438-29-6). One feature of the conversion from factory to apartments was the use of blue tinted glass, as can be seen in the photograph, for the windows facing south looking over the New Coast Road, helping to reduce the solar gain of the large windows. Another notable feature of the conversion was the excellence of the soundproofing between the flats.
