= Gold Flake =

Indian cigarette brand

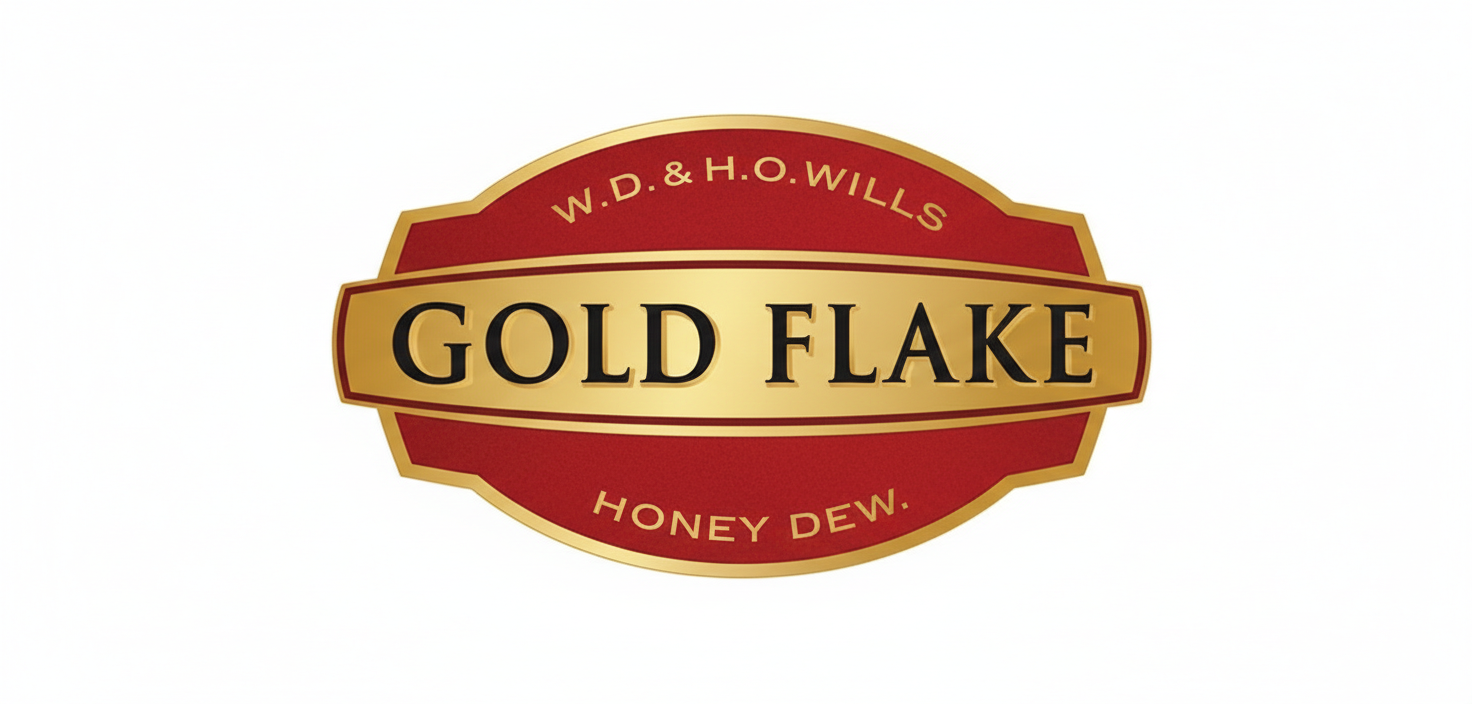
- Product type: Cigarette
- Produced by: ITC
- Related brands: Gold Flake, Gold Flake Kings, Gold Flake Kings Lights, Gold Flake Neo

Gold Flake is an Indian cigarette brand that has been on the market for over a century.

Gold Flake is sold in a multitude of varieties, including Gold Flake Kings (84mm), Gold Flake Kings Lights (84mm), Gold Flake and Gold Flake Lights. This brand is owned, manufactured and marketed by ITC Limited.

== History ==
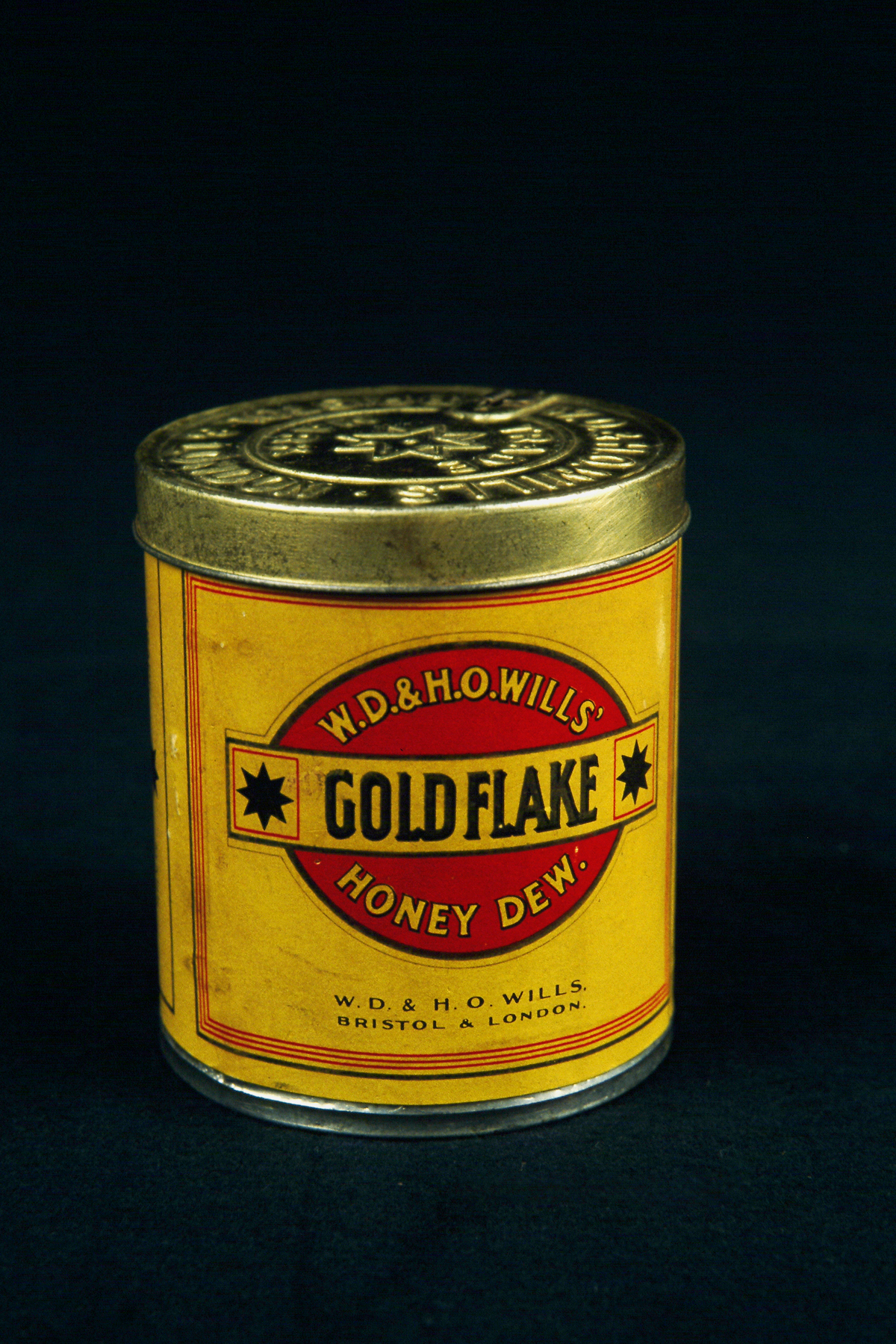
Gold Flake cigarettes sold in a metal container between 1945 and 1955.

Gold Flake was first produced in the United Kingdom by Stephen Mitchell & Son of Glasgow. From 1901, Bristol's W.D. & H.O. Wills, a subsidiary of Imperial Tobacco, took over production. "Gold flake" refers to cigarettes made using bright rich golden tobacco. After 1912, the biggest change came in 1971 with the introduction of Gold Flake Kings, followed up with the launch of Gold Flake Kings Lights in 1999.

Gold Flake enjoys a large market share in Pakistan where it is sold by British American Tobacco Pakistan.

== ITC In India ==
ITC launched the brand Gold Flake in India in the 1960s. Initial advertisements were targeted towards adult male SEC A category smokers.

After the introduction of lights as a category, the brand introduced Honeydew Smooth – giving the brand a recognizable differentiator with a dew drop symbol. With smoothness being their biggest selling proposition, the brand used symbols like the silk scarf, feather, paint brush, violin, marble vase, hour glass, and shell as visuals to reiterate and associate themselves with smoothness.

After this, the brand reinvented its image and positioning with a new campaign that moved away from the established Honeydew campaign. This was the Go Smooth campaign.

== Marketing ==
Many poster advertisements have been made for Gold Flake cigarettes, especially in India.

In the early 1900s, two characters by the names of "Mr. Gold" and "Mr. Flake" were introduced to promote the Gold Flake brand in the United Kingdom. The characters were used for about 30 years and were popular, but it did not help the sales of the brand and Gold Flake was discontinued for a short period of time.

== Markets ==
Indian pack of Gold Flake Kings

Gold Flake is mainly sold in India. It was exported to Canada, Jamaica, Ireland, the United Kingdom, the Netherlands, Germany, Switzerland, Egypt, South Africa, the Palestinian territories, Nepal, Pakistan and Malaysia.

== Products ==
The brand has many variations, including Gold Flake Kings (84mm) and Gold Flake Kings Lights (84mm). A 10-pack of Gold Flake quad-core cigarettes costs Rs. 125. Various other variants are available at different prices, and Gold Flake is amongst the top 10 best brands in India.

As of 2013, Gold Flake has been targeting young adult smokers. It extended beyond the SEC A category to the SEC B as well. ITC has launched its smallest size which is of 64 mm and costs 79 Rupees for a 10-pack of cigarettes.

== Sponsorship ==
Gold Flake was the main sponsor of the Gold Flake Open tennis tournament from 1997 until 2001. It was an ATP tennis tournament held in Chennai, India. The tournament is now known as the Maharashtra Open. The tournament was held from 6 April to 13 April.
