= Tobacco industry in Pakistan =

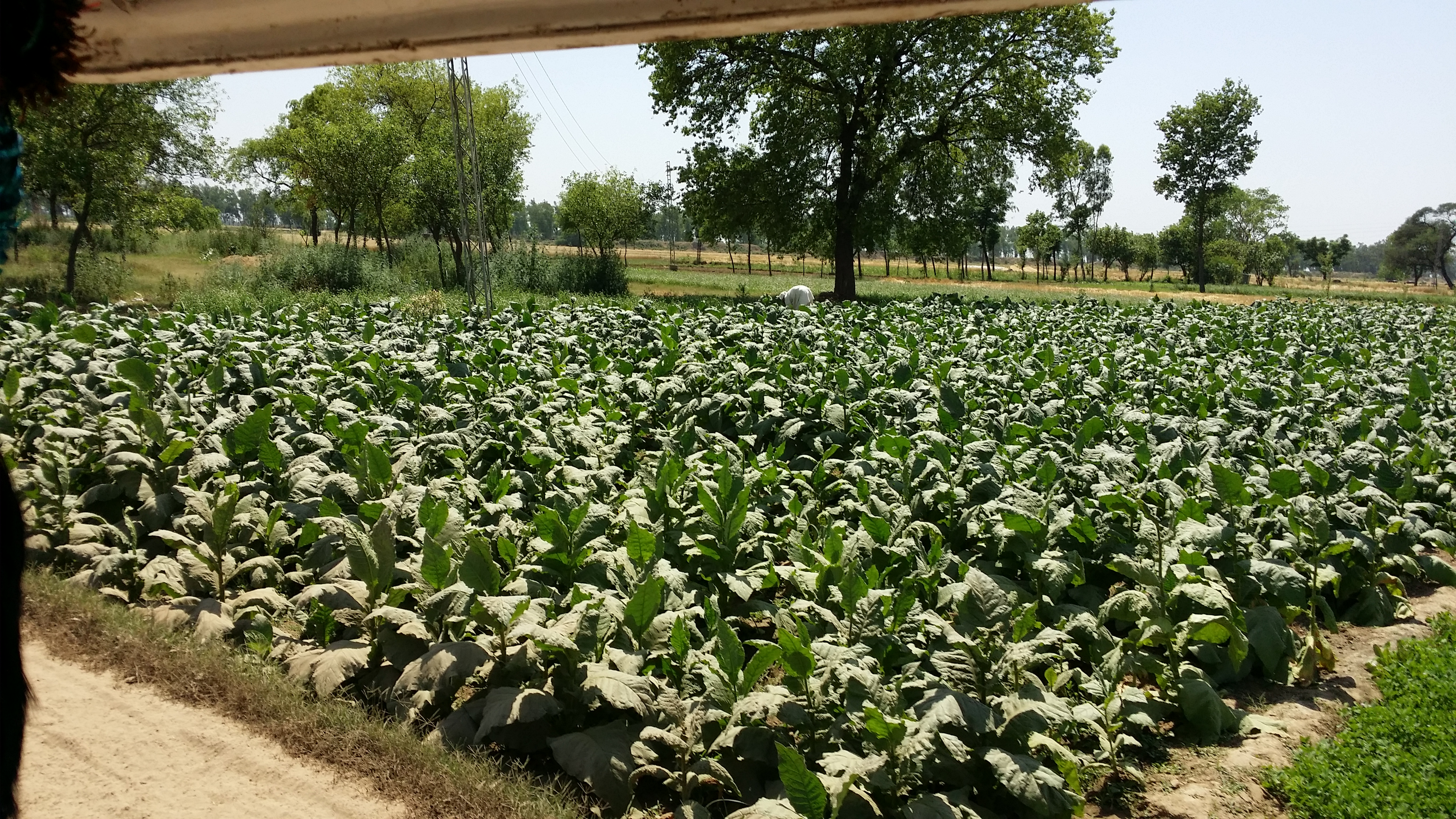
Tobacco cultivation in Punjab, Pakistan.

Tobacco occupies an uneasy place in Pakistan's political economy: it is a cash crop for some 75,000 farming households concentrated in Khyber Pakhtunkhwa, the raw material for a multibillion-rupee cigarette industry dominated by two multinationals, and simultaneously the focus of intensifying public-health regulation. Together, leaf growing, primary processing and cigarette manufacturing contribute less than 1 percent to GDP, yet the Federal Board of Revenue routinely counts on cigarettes for 10–12 percent of excise receipts, revenue that has shaped policy just as surely as WHO advice and civil-society pressure.

Around 60 percent of market share is held by Pakistan Tobacco Company and Philip Morris Pakistan.

== History ==
Modern cigarette manufacture arrived under British rule when Imperial Tobacco set up factories at Saharanpur and Mardan. At independence in 1947, British American Tobacco (BAT) reorganised these assets as the Pakistan Tobacco Company (PTC), the country's first large foreign-owned firm. Philip Morris entered in 1967 by acquiring Premier Tobacco Industries and later merged its interests into Lakson Tobacco Company, giving the two multinationals control of the formal market.

During the 1990s, rampant smuggling of duty-free "transit" brands and large-scale domestic tax evasion eroded government revenue and PTC's market share. Company memoranda from the period show BAT lobbying Islamabad both for stricter excise enforcement and against the full liberalisation of imports. Tighter oversight followed the Prohibition of Smoking and Protection of Non-Smokers Health Ordinance 2002, and soon followed by ratification of the WHO Framework Convention on Tobacco Control (FCTC) in November 2004, committing the state to higher excise duties, pictorial warnings and smoke-free spaces.

== Cultivation and production ==
Tobacco is grown on 0.25 percent of irrigated land in Pakistan. As of 2016, 34,000 hectares were under cultivation which fell from 43,000 hectares a few years ago. Most of the agricultural cultivation is based in Charsadda District, Mardan District, Nowshera District, and Swabi District of Khyber Pakhtunkhwa.

Flue-cured Virginia grown in Swabi, Charsadda and Mardan accounts for roughly four-fifths of leaf output; dark air-cured and rustica varieties supply Naswar and Hookah blends. The Pakistan Tobacco Board set the approved procurement quota for crop year 2025 at 74.8 million kg, down 14 percent in two seasons, a cut that triggered farmer protests over "late and arbitrary" announcements.

At the factory gate, the Quantum Index of Manufacturing shows tobacco manufacturing adding 0.39 percentage-points to large-scale manufacturing (LSM) growth in November 2024, even as overall LSM remained negative. Separate PBS data put cigarette output at 15.4 billion sticks in July–November FY 2024-25, up 30.8 percent year-on-year.

== Regulation and taxation ==
Pakistan ratified the WHO FCTC in 2004, but its first comprehensive domestic law remains the 2002 Ordinance, which bans most forms of advertising, restricts sales to minors and empowers health authorities to set pictorial warnings. Enforcement tightened after a 2014 statutory regulatory order; a Philip Morris court challenge was withdrawn in 2016, allowing a near-total advertising ban to stand.

Pictorial health warnings were expanded in stages, from 40 percent of the front panel in 2010 to 60 percent in 2019, amid industry lobbying that stalled the originally proposed 85 percent coverage.

Fiscal policy relies on a two-tier Federal Excise Duty (FED). The 2023 emergency mini-budget raised the upper-tier rate to PKR 16,500 per 1,000 sticks; the Finance Act 2024 left rates unchanged but lifted the lower-tier price threshold to PKR 12,500, a move critics say created head-room for manufacturers to raise prices without paying more tax. Provinces have begun imposing their own levies on raw leaf: Khyber Pakhtunkhwa’s 2024 Act introduced a cess of PKR 50 per kg, cut to PKR 25 after growers blockaded the provincial assembly.

== Advertising and promotion ==
Before 2002, cigarette brands sponsored cricket, cinema commercials and radio music programmes; BAT's "Explore the World" and Benson & Hedges' "Golden Tones" campaigns targeted urban males under 30.

As of 2025, advertising is prohibited, but brand stretching through social-media influencers, point-of-sale lighting and hospitality events remains a compliance headache for regulators, who have limited federal inspectors nationwide.

== Listed companies ==
- Pakistan Tobacco Company
- Philip Morris Pakistan
- Khyber Tobacco Company
