= W.D. & H.O. Wills =

Former English tobacco company

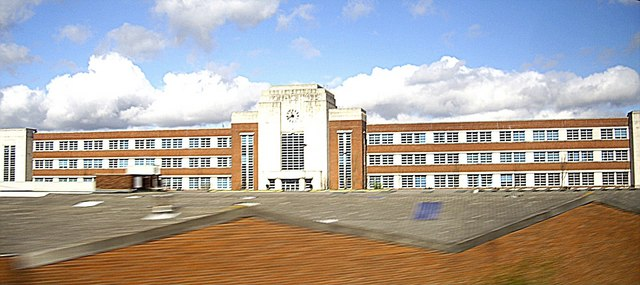
- Wills former factory in Newcastle upon Tyne, pictured in 2009
- Type: Private
- Industry: Tobacco
- Founded: 1786; 240 years ago
- Founder: Henry O. Wills
- Defunct: 1901; 125 years ago
- Fate: Merged as a branch, or division, of the Imperial Tobacco Company.
- Headquarters: Bristol
- Key people: List: William D. Wills (son); Henry O. Wills II (son); William H. Wills; Henry O. Wills III; Frederick Wills
- Products: Cigarettes
- Brands: List: Capstan; Castella; Embassy; Passing Clouds; Panama; Woodbine

W.D. & H.O. Wills was a British tobacco manufacturing company formed in Bristol, England. It was the first British company to mass-produce cigarettes. It was one of the 13 founding companies of the Imperial Tobacco Company (of Great Britain and Ireland); these firms became branches, or divisions, of the new combine and included John Player & Sons.

The company was founded by Henry O. Wills in 1786, and went by various names before 1830 when it became "W.D. & H.O. Wills". Tobacco was processed and sold under several brand names, some of which were still used by Imperial Tobacco until the second half of the 20th century. The company pioneered the use of cigarette cards within their packaging. Many of the buildings in Bristol and other cities around the United Kingdom still exist with several being converted to residential use.

The brand "Wills" was withdrawn by Imperial Tobacco in 1988 for the majority of its products.

== History ==
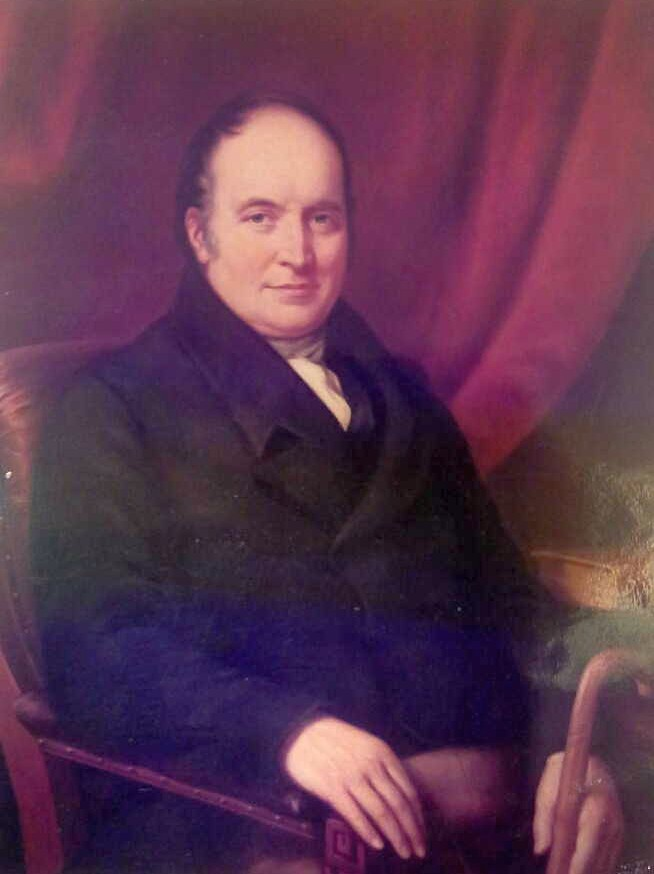
Henry O. Wills, founder

Henry O. Wills arrived in Bristol in 1786 from Salisbury, and opened a tobacco shop on Castle Street with his partner Samuel Watkins. They named their firm Wills, Watkins & Co. When Watkins retired in 1789, the firm became Wills & Co. Next, the company was known from 1791 to 1793 as Lilly, Wills & Co, when it merged with the firm of Peter Lilly, who owned a snuff mill on the Land Yeo at Barrow Gurney. The company then was known from 1793 up until Lilly's retirement in 1803 as Lilly and Wills.

In 1826, H.O. Wills's sons William Day Wills and Henry O. Wills II took over the company, which in 1830 became "W.D. & H.O. Wills". William Day Wills' middle name is from his mother Anne Day of Bristol. Both W.D. and H.O. Wills were non-smokers. Other members of the family joined the business, such as Henry O. Wills III in 1846, and William Henry Wills in 1858. When William Day Wills died in May 1865, two days after stepping in front of a horse-drawn carriage, necessitating the amputation of his left leg, 2000 people attended his funeral at Arnos Vale Cemetery.

During the 1860s, a new factory was built to replace the original Redcliffe Street premises, but the firm quickly outgrew it. The East Street factory of W.D. & H.O. Wills, in Bedminster, opened in 1886, with a high tea for the 900 employees in the Cigar Room. The new factory was expected to meet the needs of the company for the remainder of the century but, it was doubled in size within a decade and, early in the 1900s, a further Bristol factory was created in Raleigh Road, Southville.

That growth was largely due to the success of cigarettes. The firm's first brand was Bristol, made at the London factory from 1871 to 1974. Three Castles and Gold Flake followed in 1878, but the greatest success was the machine-made Woodbine ten years later. Embassy was introduced in 1914 and relaunched in 1962 with coupons. Other popular brands included Capstan and Passing Clouds. The company also made cigar brands such as Castella and Whiffs, several pipe tobacco brands and Golden Virginia hand-rolling tobacco.

In 1901, the Wills family organised a concerted response by British tobacco manufacturers to the aggressive entry into the UK market by the American Tobacco Company. This initiative on the part of 13 companies resulted in the incorporation of the Imperial Tobacco Company on 10 December 1901, and its consolidation as the predominant producer in the UK; seven of its directors were members of the Wills family. In 1902 the subsequent truce with American Tobacco saw the creation of the jointly owned British American Tobacco; the new subsidiary, which was established with Wills's export factory, was allocated markets outside the US and the UK.

Imperial Tobacco remained one of the world's largest tobacco companies until it was acquired by the Hanson Trust in 1986. A decade later, in 1996, Hanson demerged its tobacco manufacturing assets to a new company floated on the Stock Exchange, the Imperial Group.

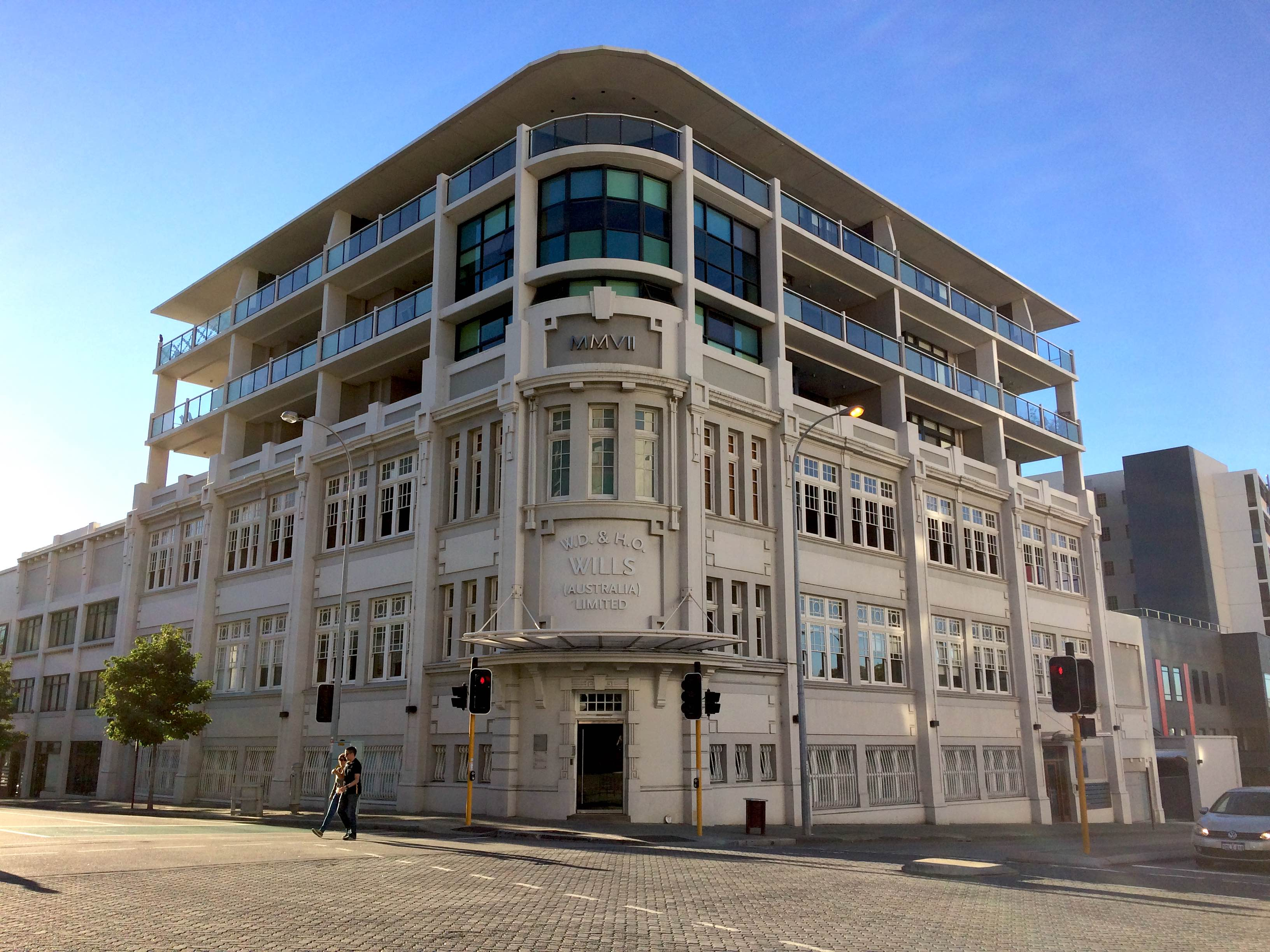
The former W.D. & H.O. Wills warehouse building in Perth, Western Australia, pictured in 2018

Wills major factories and offices were in Bedminster, Bristol, with other facilities in Holborn, London, Swindon, Newcastle and Glasgow.

Up until 1920, only women and girls were employed as cigar-makers. One clause in the women's contract stipulated:

She shall not contract Matrimony within the said Term, nor play at Card or Dice Tables, or any other unlawful Games.

In 1898 Henry Herbert Wills visited Australia which led to the establishment of W.D. & H.O. Wills (Australia) Ltd. in 1900. The largest cigarette factory in Europe was opened at Hartcliffe, Bristol, designed in 1974 by Skidmore, Owings & Merrill, but closed in 1990. It proved impossible to find a new use for the premises and the building was demolished in 1999. Its site is now the Imperial Park retail complex, but the associated offices became Lakeshore, residential apartments, created by Urban Splash.

The façade of the large factory in Bedminster, and the bonded warehouses at Cumberland Basin, remain prominent buildings in Bristol, although much of the existing land and buildings have been converted to other uses, such as The Tobacco Factory Theatre.

The Newcastle factory closed in 1986 and stood derelict for over a decade, before the front of the Art Deco building – which was preserved by being Grade II listed – reopened in 1998 as a block of luxury apartments. (See main article: Wills Building) The factory in Glasgow has similarly been converted into offices.

The last member of the Wills family to serve the company was Christopher, the great great grandson of H.O. Wills I, who retired as sales research manager in 1969.

In 1988 Imperial Tobacco withdrew the Wills brand in the United Kingdom, except for the Woodbine and Capstan Full Strength brands, which still carry the name.

When Princess Elizabeth visited the Bedminster factory on 3 March 1950 she was given cigarette cards as a gift for her son, future King Charles III.

=== Benevolence ===
The company pioneered canteens for the workers, free medical care, sports facilities and paid holidays. Wills commissioned portraits of long-serving employees, several of which are held by Bristol Museum and Art Gallery and some of which can be seen on display at the M Shed museum. In 1893, the W.D. & H.O. Wills Ltd Association Football Team was established, and the company also held singing classes for the younger workers and women that year. In 1899, wives of Wills employees serving in the Boer War were granted 10s per week by the factory.

== Archives ==
Bristol Archives holds extensive records of W.D. & H.O. Wills and Imperial Tobacco. In addition there are photographs of the Newcastle factory of W.D. & H.O. Wills at Tyne and Wear Archives.

M Shed in Bristol holds the Wills Collection of Tobacco Antiquities, consisting of advertising, marketing and packaging samples from the company's history, photographs and artefacts relating to the history of tobacco.

== Notable products ==
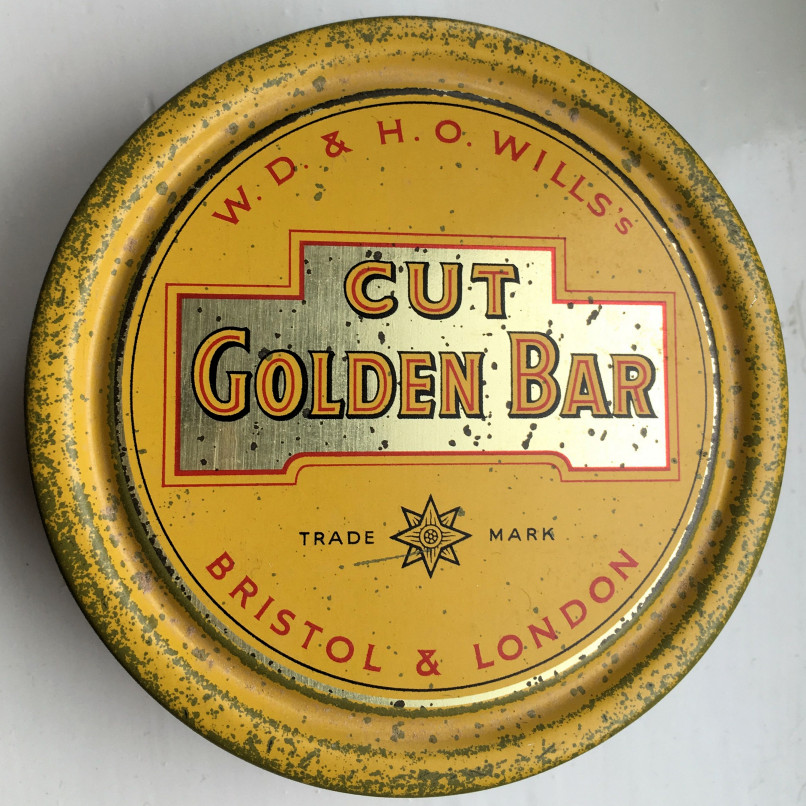
Cut Golden Bar tobacco tin

From the early 20th century to April 1951 "Pirate" was one of the most recognized cigarette brands in China. In Chinese it was commonly referred to as 'lao dao pai', meaning 'Old Knife Brand' in reference to the sword the pirate was carrying on the brand's key visual. The brand had a short revival in China under different ownership in 1994 but was eventually discontinued in 1997.

In 1959 the company launched the short-lived Strand brand. This was accompanied by the memorable but disastrous, You're never alone with a Strand television advertisement.

In India, the Gold Flake, Classic and Wills Navy Cut range of cigarettes, manufactured by ITC, formerly the Imperial Tobacco Company of India Limited, still has W.D. & H.O. Wills printed on the cigarettes and their packaging. These lines of cigarettes have a dominant market share.

== Cigarette cards ==
In 1887, Wills were one of the first UK tobacco companies to include advertising cards in their packs of cigarettes, but it was not until 1895 that they produced their first general interest set of cards ('Ships and Sailors'). Other Wills sets include 'Aviation' (1910), 'Lucky Charms' (1923), 'British Butterflies' (1927), 'Famous Golfers' (1930), 'Garden Flowers' (1933) and 'Air Raid Precautions' (1938).

Wills also released several sports sets, such as the cricket (1901, 1908, 1909, 1910), association football (1902, 1935, 1939), rugby union (1902, 1929) and Australian rules football (1905) series.

=== Gallery ===
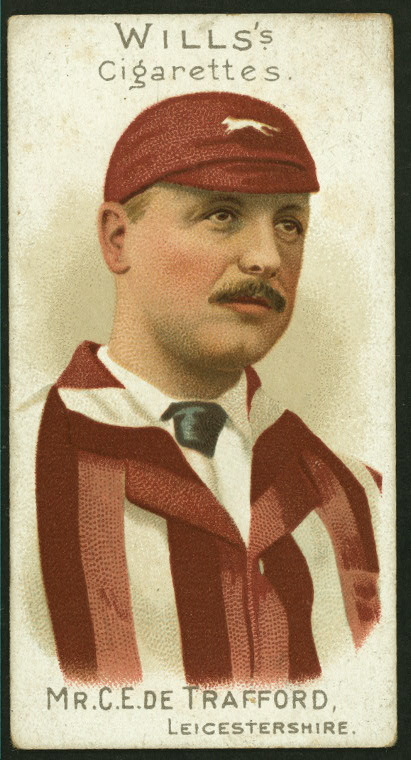
Charles de Trafford, 1901

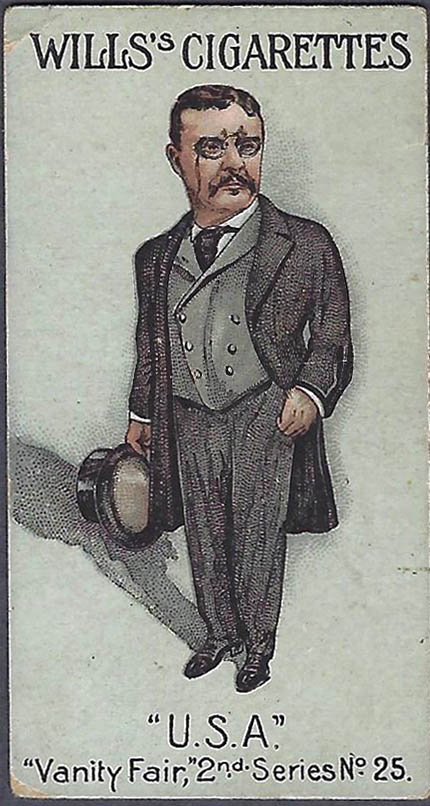
Theodore Roosevelt, 1902

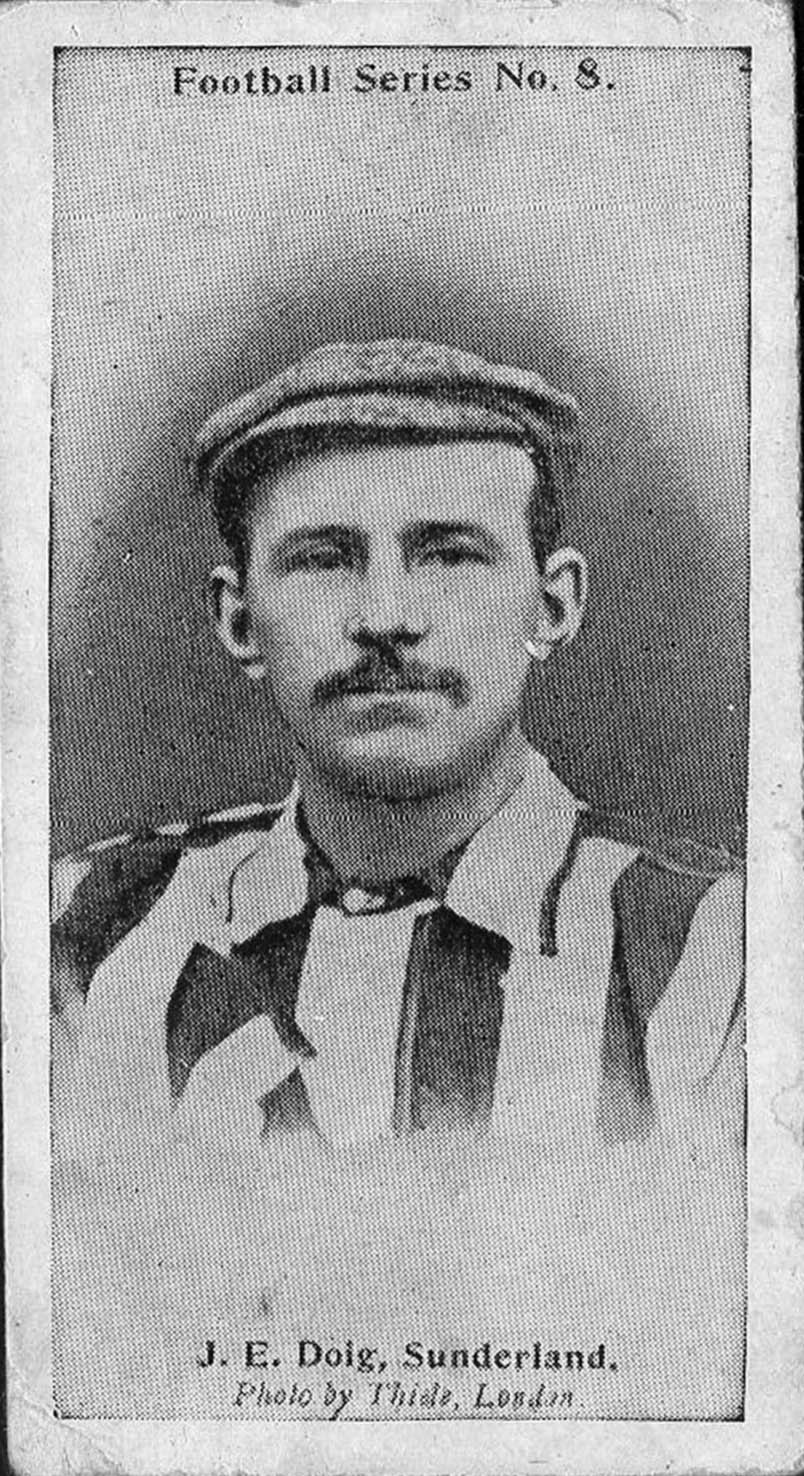
J.E. Doig of Sunderland, 1902

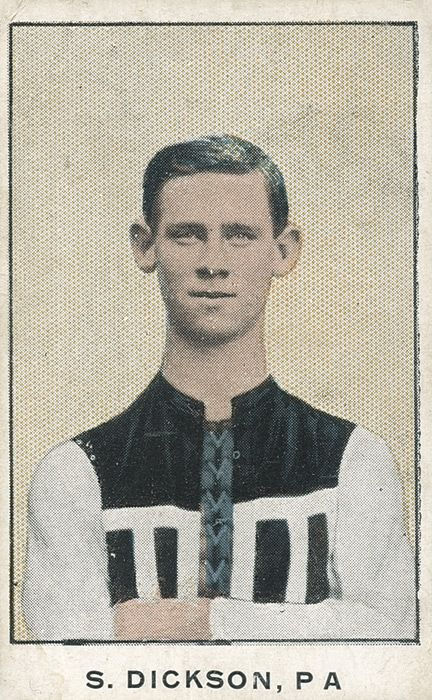
James Dickson of Port Adelaide, 1906

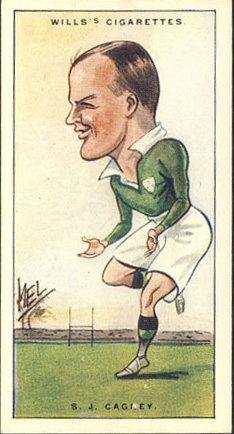
S.J. Cagney of Ireland, 1929

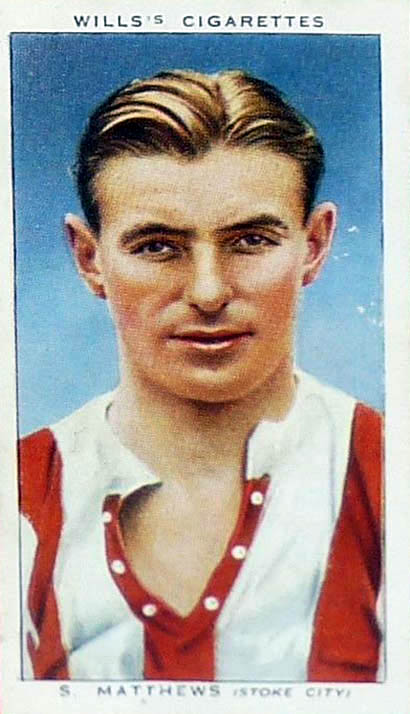
Stanley Matthews, 1939

== In popular culture ==
The factory in Hartcliffe, Bristol, was used for location filming for the UK television series Doctor Who, for the 1977 serial The Sun Makers. Filming at the Wills Factory spanned 13 to 15 June 1977. In addition to the roof and tunnels, scenes were also filmed in the lift and the roof vent.

== See also ==
- List of cricketers in Wills' Cigarettes Cricketers, 1928
- British-Australasian Tobacco Company
