= Pakistan Tobacco Company =

Pakistani tobacco subsidiary

- Native name: شرکت تنباکو پاکستان
- Type: Public
- Traded as: PSX: PAKT; KSE 100 component
- Industry: Tobacco
- Founded: November 18, 1947; 78 years ago in Karachi, Pakistan
- Headquarters: Islamabad, Pakistan
- Key people: Zafar Mahmood (Chairman); Syed Ali Akbar (CEO)
- Brands: Dunhill, Benson & Hedges, John Player Gold Leaf, Capstan, Gold Flake, Embassy, Velo
- Revenue: ▲ Rs. 94.86 billion (US$340 million) (2022)
- Operating income: ▲ Rs. 32.78 billion (US$120 million) (2022)
- Net income: ▲ Rs. 21.32 billion (US$76 million) (2022)
- Total assets: ▲ Rs. 26.62 billion (US$95 million) (2022)
- Number of employees: 1,051 (2022)
- Parent: British American Tobacco
- Website: ptc.com.pk

Pakistan Tobacco Company Limited is a Pakistani tobacco manufacturing company based in Islamabad. It is a subsidiary of British American Tobacco and the largest cigarette manufacturer in Pakistan. It operates two factories in Akora Khattak near Nowshera and Jhelum.

== History ==
=== Background ===
British American Tobacco, whose first Indian base was in Calcutta, spread a sales network across British India between 1902 and 1908, setting up branches in cities such as Karachi. Its first attempt to make cigarettes in India was a small Karachi plant with ten Bonsack machines, set up in 1906. Tobacco did not keep well in the local climate, and the plant was given up soon afterwards. BAT then built a factory at Monghyr, about 321 km (199 mi) north-west of Calcutta, which opened in May 1908 under its subsidiary, the Peninsular Tobacco Company. The Imperial Tobacco Company of India was incorporated in 1910. At independence in August 1947, Pakistan had no factories making tobacco products by machine.

=== Formation and expansion (1947–1971) ===
Pakistan Tobacco Company was registered in Sind on November 18, 1947, as a private limited company. BAT formed it to take over the Pakistani operations of three companies: the Imperial Tobacco Company of India, Tobacco Manufacturers (India) and the Indian Leaf Tobacco Development Company. It was one of the first foreign investments in Pakistan.

The company began with a single warehouse near the Karachi port. It started making cigarettes in Karachi in 1949, first at a plant at West Wharf and, from March 1950, at a larger factory at Mauripur, built with government help on a 30-acre site. By 1954, PTC also had a leaf re-drying factory at Akora Khattak in the North-West Frontier Province, from which it contracted local farmers to supply it with tobacco. A second cigarette factory, in Chittagong in East Bengal, was scheduled to begin operating in 1954 and could make 30 million cigarettes a month, and a factory in Jhelum followed in 1956. By 1968, the company had cigarette factories in Karachi, Jhelum, Dacca and Chittagong, as well as the re-drying plant at Akora Khattak.

In 1955, PTC became a public limited company and was listed on the Karachi Stock Exchange the following year. In the early 1970s, it held 40.8 percent of Pakistan's cigarette market. It also owned more than 33 percent of Khyber Tobacco Company, which had another 16.2 percent of the market, and three of Khyber Tobacco's seven directors were PTC executives. The Monopoly Control Authority served notice on both companies over the link, but did not pursue the case after they argued that it had helped Khyber Tobacco, which had been making heavy losses. PTC later sold its stake in Khyber Tobacco.

PTC introduced its Three Castles brand in the 1950s. In the 1960s, it began filming commercials abroad for its Capstan brand, and its flagship Gold Leaf was sold as the most expensive locally made cigarette. It remained the market leader for as long as cigarette advertising in the media went unrestricted.

=== 1971–2000 ===
After the independence of Bangladesh, the company's former business in East Pakistan was incorporated on February 2, 1972, as Bangladesh Tobacco Company. In Pakistan, a new PTC factory at Akora Khattak had its official opening in April 1976. PTC's sponsorship of cricket began in 1977.

In 1996, PTC introduced Benson & Hedges to Pakistan. It made a loss in every year from 1995 to 2000, losing Rs 1.68 billion in total. In 1996, it booked a gain of Rs 134.7 million from selling the site of its Karachi factory, and a restructuring in 2000–01 eliminated more than 1,200 jobs and cut the workforce by a third. The company returned to profit in 2001, earning Rs 354 million. By 2001, its head office was in Islamabad.

=== 2000–present ===
PTC's share of the Pakistani cigarette market was 55 percent in 2011 and 66 percent in 2017. The company lobbied against larger health warnings on cigarette packs. In March 2015, a PTC delegation told the finance minister of its objections to a health ministry notification on the warnings, and in October 2017 it took the matter up in a letter to the prime minister. In 2018, the health ministry required warnings covering 50 percent of the pack rather than the 85 percent it had first proposed.

In April 2019, PTC launched its "Made in Pakistan" exports initiative, becoming the fourth company in BAT's Asia Pacific and Middle East region to serve as an export hub, after Indonesia, South Korea, and Singapore. The initiative initially focused on the export of cigarettes and processed tobacco to Saudi Arabia, the Gulf Cooperation Council and other Middle Eastern countries. In the same year, PTC introduced the nicotine pouch category in Pakistan with the launch of Velo, a tobacco-free oral nicotine pouch developed by BAT.

In December 2020, PTC announced plans to establish a business process outsourcing (BPO) hub in Pakistan to serve the Asia–Pacific and Middle East regions. BAT also relocated its shared services unit from Malaysia to Pakistan.

In July 2025, Systems Limited acquired BAT SAA Services (Private) Limited, the BPO arm operated for the BAT group out of Pakistan, from British American Tobacco International Holdings (UK) Limited.

== Operations ==
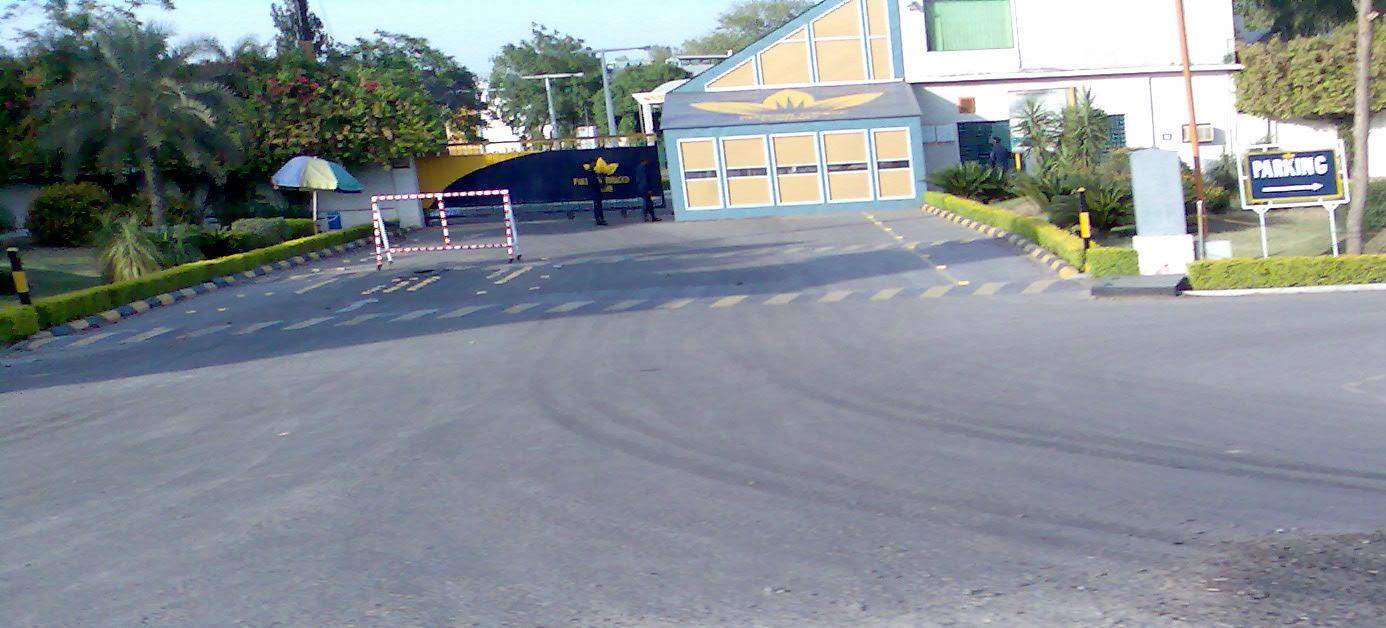
Pakistan Tobacco Company factory in Jhelum

PTC's head office is in Islamabad. It runs two factories. The one at Akora Khattak threshes green tobacco leaf and makes cigarettes, and the one at Jhelum makes cigarettes and Velo nicotine pouches. In 2009, Jhelum was its main manufacturing site. PTC buys flue-cured Virginia tobacco from growers under contract in Khyber Pakhtunkhwa, where it and Philip Morris Pakistan purchase most of the crop, and it also buys leaf in Punjab.

Its cigarette brands include Dunhill, Benson & Hedges, John Player Gold Leaf, Capstan by Pall Mall, Gold Flake and Embassy, as well as the nicotine pouch brand Velo and the vaping brand Vuse.

== See also ==
- Tobacco industry in Pakistan
