= ActionShot =

Photography technique

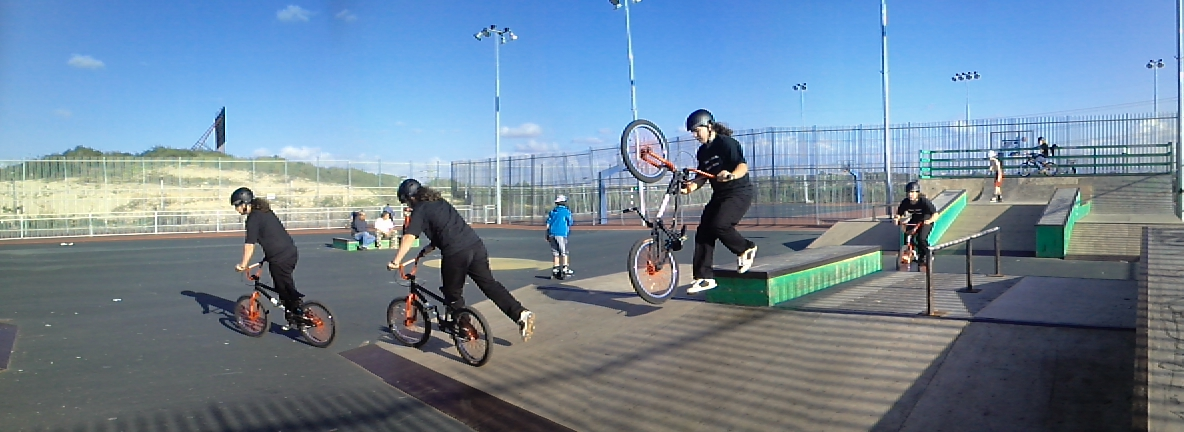
ActionShot photograph of a bicycle rider.

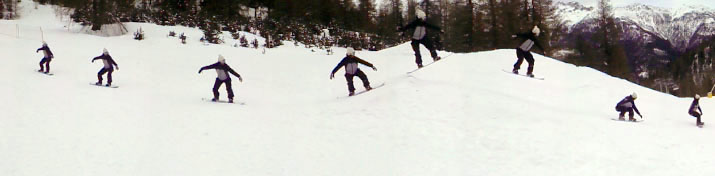
ActionShot photograph of a snowboarder.

ActionShot is a method of capturing an object in action and displaying it in a single image with multiple sequential appearances of the object.

Additional names: action synopsis, motion synopsis, panoramic video synopsis, dynamic still, synopsis mosaic, stromotion.

== Background ==
There are many methods for capturing panoramic images, some being fully manual or semi-automatic, and others completely automatic. However, the majority of these methods are for creating panoramic photos of a static landscape. In contrast, the capture of a dynamic scene — i.e. recording the motion of a moving object — is typically done by video recording.

ActionShot is a method that combines elements of both panoramic and video photography to create panoramic photos of dynamic scenes that take place over a wide-angle area. This involves capturing a moving object (e.g. a person running, riding a bicycle or skiing) and depicting multiple instances of this object over a single panoramic background.

== Methods ==
=== Hardware ===
Stroboscopes have been used to create static images of an action. The moving object is illuminated by the periodic light flashes generated by the stroboscope and is shot by a stills camera using a long exposure. This results in a photograph that displays multiple images of the object along its path.

ActionShot photography is now available as part of camera application on Samsung Android Galaxy Premium Devices (Samsung Galaxy S and Samsung Galaxy S2) or by downloading the Nokia Smartcam app on the Microsoft Lumia Phones

=== Manual image editing ===
To create a dynamic panoramic image manually, a photographer needs to take several shots or still frames from a high-resolution video of a moving object and then combine them together using manual image registration, followed by manual image stitching. Image editing programs can assist in this process.

=== Automatic image processing ===
Early digital image processing methods created a "synopsis mosaic" by building a panoramic image a video sequence where higher weights were assigned to the moving objects. However, good image registration and stitching alone were not sufficient for creating a realistic image, because if the moving object overlaps itself, the combined result seems highly unnatural. This in order to create eye-catching synopsis still images, and even videos, the moving objects are required not to overlap in the composed result.

== Related methods ==
- Action synopsis for computer animation

== See also ==
- Panoramic photography
- Image stitching
- Video synopsis
