= Capstan (cigarette) =

British brand of unfiltered cigarettes

- Product type: Cigarette
- Current owner: Imperial Brands
- Country: United Kingdom
- Introduced: 1894; 132 years ago
- Markets: See Markets
- Previous owners: W. D. & H. O. Wills
- Tagline: "Time for a Capstan", "Have a Capstan"

Capstan is a British brand of unfiltered cigarettes, currently owned and manufactured by Imperial Brands. The brand dwindled in popularity when the health effects of tobacco became more widely known; few shops sell them today.

== History ==
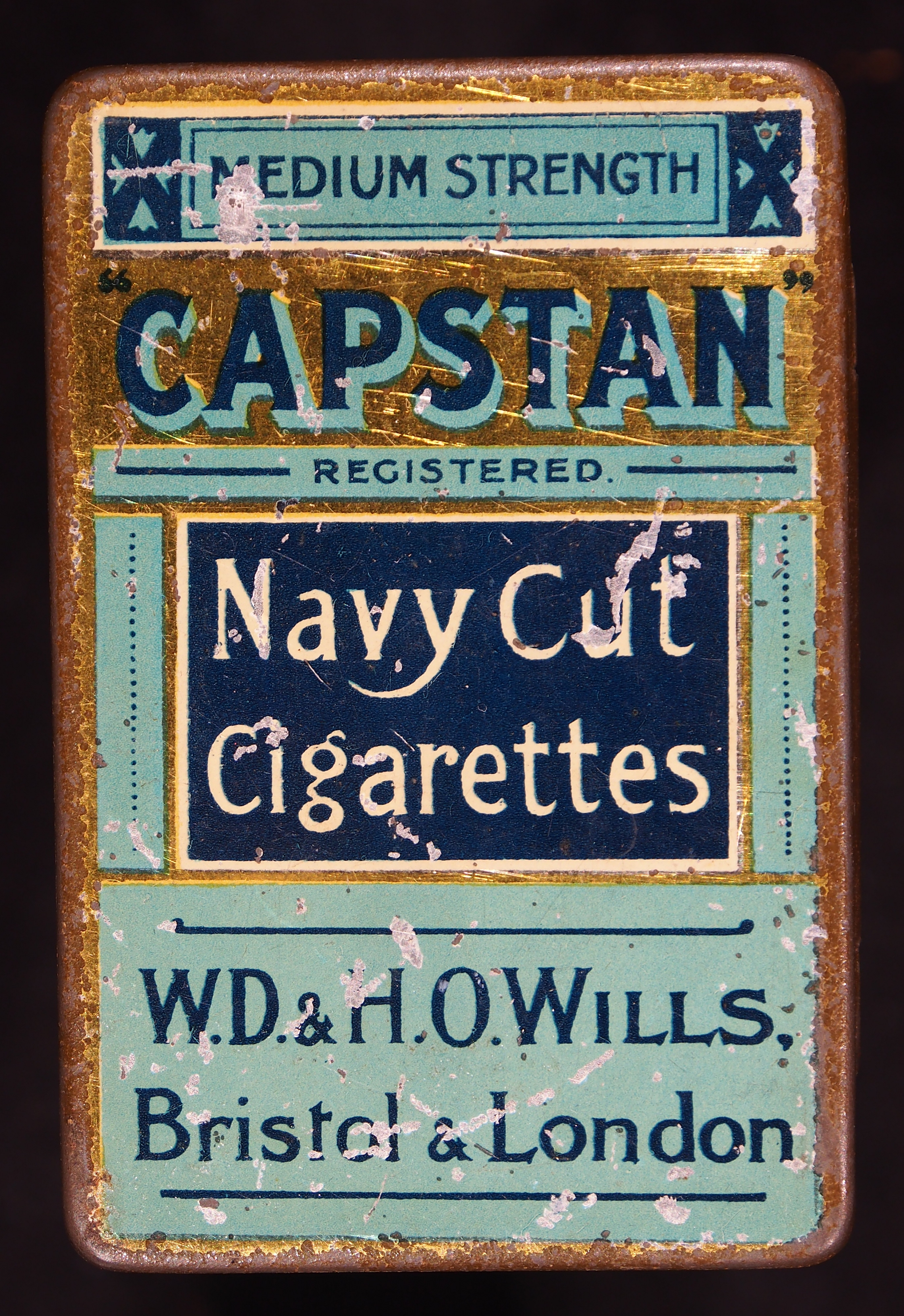
A pack of Capstan cigarettes, c. 1930

Capstan was originally launched by W.D. & H.O. Wills in 1894, and was one of the most popular brands of cigarettes in the early-twentieth century. W.D. & H.O. Wills spent £4,000 (equivalent to £477,509.50 in 2018) on promoting the Capstan cigarettes in 1900, and these amounts were in addition to regular charges for advertising, including showcards and newspaper advertisements. It was W.D. & H.O. Wills' answer to Player's Medium cigarettes. In 1973, the UK Government published a table of the tar and nicotine contents of cigarettes available in the UK market, and Capstan Full Strength contained, by a margin of 0.21 mg/cigarette, the highest nicotine content (3.39 mg/cigarette) of any brand, and the second-highest tar content. However, since 2004 cigarettes sold in the UK have had a cap of 10 mg of tar and 1 mg of nicotine per cigarette.

Various advertising posters were made for Capstan cigarettes, including one to encourage female workers in factories during World War II to smoke Capstan to relax at the end of a working day. One of the most well-known slogans at the time was "Time for a Capstan". Another popular slogan after the end of WWII was "Have a Capstan". A few celebrities advertised this brand, such as English actress Evelyn Laye and British star David Niven.

The song "Saturday's Kids" from The Jam's 1979 album Setting Sons features the lyric "Their mums and dads smoke Capstan non-filters/Wallpaper lives 'cause they all die of cancer".

== Markets ==
Capstan is mainly sold in the United Kingdom, but also was or still is sold in Germany, Sri Lanka, India, Pakistan, Malaysia, Hong Kong, Australia, New Zealand, Canada, Bangladesh and Chile.

== Cigarette cards ==
Capstan was one of the tobacco companies to include advertising cards in their packs of cigarettes. Some of the collections featured were the cricket series featuring notable players (1907) and the Australian rules football collections that includes depictions of club flags and colours in 1908 and 1913.
