= Health effect =

Changes in health resulting from exposure to a specific source

Health effects (or health impacts) are changes in health resulting from exposure to a source. Health effects are an important consideration in many areas, such as hygiene, pollution studies, occupational safety and health, nutrition, and health sciences in general. Much of the attention is focused on adverse health effects, which are harmful changes to health as a result of exposure to an environmental factor. Occasionally, lack of exposure to certain effectors has detrimental consequences on an individual's health. Examples of such effectors include sunlight and exercise.

== Environmental Health Effects ==
One major source of health effects is chemical contaminants, which can cause air pollution, water pollution, soil contamination and food contamination. Well known sources of contaminants include pesticides, household products, plastics, and industrial waste. Exposure to these sources can happen through inhaling into the lungs, ingesting by the mouth, or direct contact with skin. Other major environmental sources of health effects include noise pollution, climate change, solar radiation, and weather.

== Radiation Health Effects ==
In the context of radiation therapy, a non-stochastic or deterministic health effect has a severity that is dependent on dose and is believed to have a threshold level for which no effect is seen. Stochastic health effects occur by chance, generally occurring without a threshold level of dose, whose probability is proportional to the dose and whose severity is independent of the dose, such as cancer and genetic effects. For example, a high dose in radiation treatment can result in burned tissue, which would be a deterministic health effect, and a chance of inducing a second cancer, which would be a stochastic health effect.

== Health Impact Assessment (HIA) ==
In several industries, including transportation and agriculture, public health professionals can conduct a Health Impact Assessment (HIA) to determine whether a proposed project, policy, or program will lead to adverse health effects. An HIA can assess potential impacts, make recommendations, and address potential inequalities that may arise.

== Measuring Health Effects ==
Indicators of public health such as mortality, morbidity, disability, and quality of life can be used to measure the health effects of a policy on a population. Other indicators of population health include tobacco use, road deaths, obesity, partner violence for women, and suicide deaths.

When measuring population health, it is recommended to stratify results by race and ethnicity to identify potential racial and ethnic disparities in health impacts.

== See also ==
- Category:Radiation health effects
- Environmental health
- Health effects of alcohol
- Health impact of asbestos
- Health effects of caffeine
- Health effects of coal ash
- Health effects of pesticides
- Health effects of pollution
- Health impacts of sawdust
- Health effects of smoking tobacco
  - Health effects of electronic cigarettes
  - Health effects of nicotine
  - Health effects of snus
- Health impact assessment
- Health effects of wood smoke
- Health#Determinants
- Material safety data sheet
- Risk factor
- Social determinants of health
- Societal effects of cars
