= Ettan =

Ettan might refer to:

- Ettan (football), Swedish third division
- Ykkönen, or Ettan in Swedish, Finnish 3rd football division
- Ettan snus, tobacco product
