= Ettan snus =

Snus brand

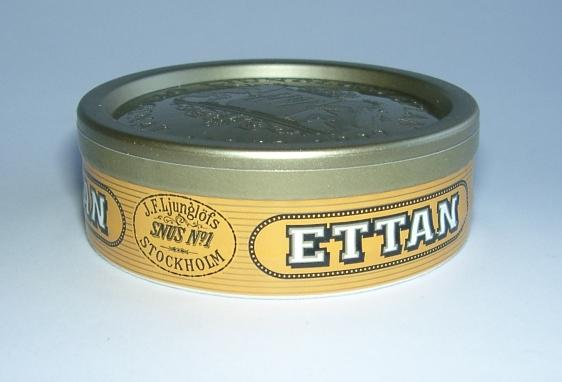
Ettan snus

Ettan is a popular brand of Swedish snus – a pasteurized smokeless tobacco product. Founded in 1822, as "Ljunglöf's No. 1", Ettan is also one of the oldest Swedish brands in existence.

The recipe was created by Mr. Jacob Fredrik Ljunglöf (1796 – 1860) as the factory's premium quality and has not been changed since 1822. Common practice was to refer to the premium quality as No. 1., (there was also a No. 2, less premium quality). In the Swedish language, "Ettan" can be translated into an everyday way of saying "the first".

== Early development of the company ==
In 1811, at the age of 14, Jacob Fredrik Ljunglöf started working at a large tobacco factory. In 1821, he took over the same factory, starting to produce snus under his own name. One year later, in 1822 he created the recipe for Ettan. In 1839 Jacob Fredrik Ljunglöf bought the former brewery site on Luntmakargatan 19 in central Stockholm, for the amount of 38,500 Riksdaler Banco and converted it into a snus factory.

== The recipe ==
In the early 19th century, tobacco was typically fermented at elevated temperatures for up to six months, before becoming snus.

Jacob Ljunglöf had a theory: If the tobacco could be used fresh, it would enhance the flavour. He therefore approached his friend, the world-renowned chemist and scientist, Jacob Berzelius, and asked him for assistance. Together, they invented a new way of producing snus with tobacco, salt water and potash. Rather than taking months to prepare, a batch of snus could now be made in a week. Since then, this has been the predominant method for manufacturing Swedish snus. Realising the value of the new production method, Jacob Fredrik Ljunglöf kept it a secret, writing the formula in a code-format.

The recipe itself is heavily relying on the quality of the ingredients as it consists of only premium tobacco, salt and water.

== Knut Ljunglöf, son of Jacob, takes over ==
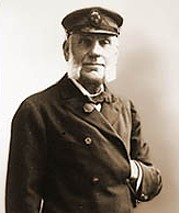
Knut Ljunglof 1880

When Jacob Fredrik Ljunglöf died in 1860, he was one of Sweden's wealthiest men, as being both the co-inventor of the new production method and the man behind the recipe "Ljunglöf's No. 1", (now Ettan). His son, Knut Ljunglöf (1833 – 1920), then developed the brand and the factory into an even more successful business. Knut Ljunglöf, commonly known as "Snus-kungen", the snus king, was known to test the quality of his products by having a silver bowl of fresh snus placed on his desk every morning. He then put a spoon of the snus under his nose and, with eyes closed, inhaled. This way he detected the moisture level and quality of the tobacco. If approved, the snus could be packed and sold. If not, the entire batch was cancelled.

== Knut Ljunglöf's personal life ==
Knut Ljunglöf was highly successful in developing the company into Europe's largest smokeless tobacco producer. At his death he left one of the greatest fortunes in Sweden; 16 million kronor. Knut Ljunglöf also left a large estate north of Stockholm, commonly known as "the Ljunglöf castle" due to its palace-like exterior.

The fact that the tobacco factories in Sweden were taken over by the Swedish state in 1915, made Knut Ljunglöf a bitter man. In 1920, five years after the monopolization, he died at the age of 87.

Knut Ljunglöf was engaged in the decision that formed the city of Stockholm and during a number of years he was a member of the city council. In his obituary it was written that he was "a good and noble man. Slightly harsh on the outside, he was a warm and compassionate man who cared for the people in need and those who suffered. Without speaking much about it publicly, he was involved in many charities."

== Ettan today ==
Ettan is a prominent brand belonging to the Swedish Match product portfolio and one of the most popular Swedish snus products. It accounts for approximately one fifth of all snus sales in Sweden.

== Products ==
Today Ettan is sold in 3 qualities:

- Ettan Lös - Loose snus, 42g per can 7,5 mg/g (0,75%)
- Ettan Original Portion - 24g per can, 24 portions in can at 1,0g per portion 8.5 mg/g (0,85%)
- Ettan Vit - White portion, 21,6g per can, 24 portions weighing at 0,9g per portion 8 mg/g (0,8%)
