= Röda Lacket =

Snus brand

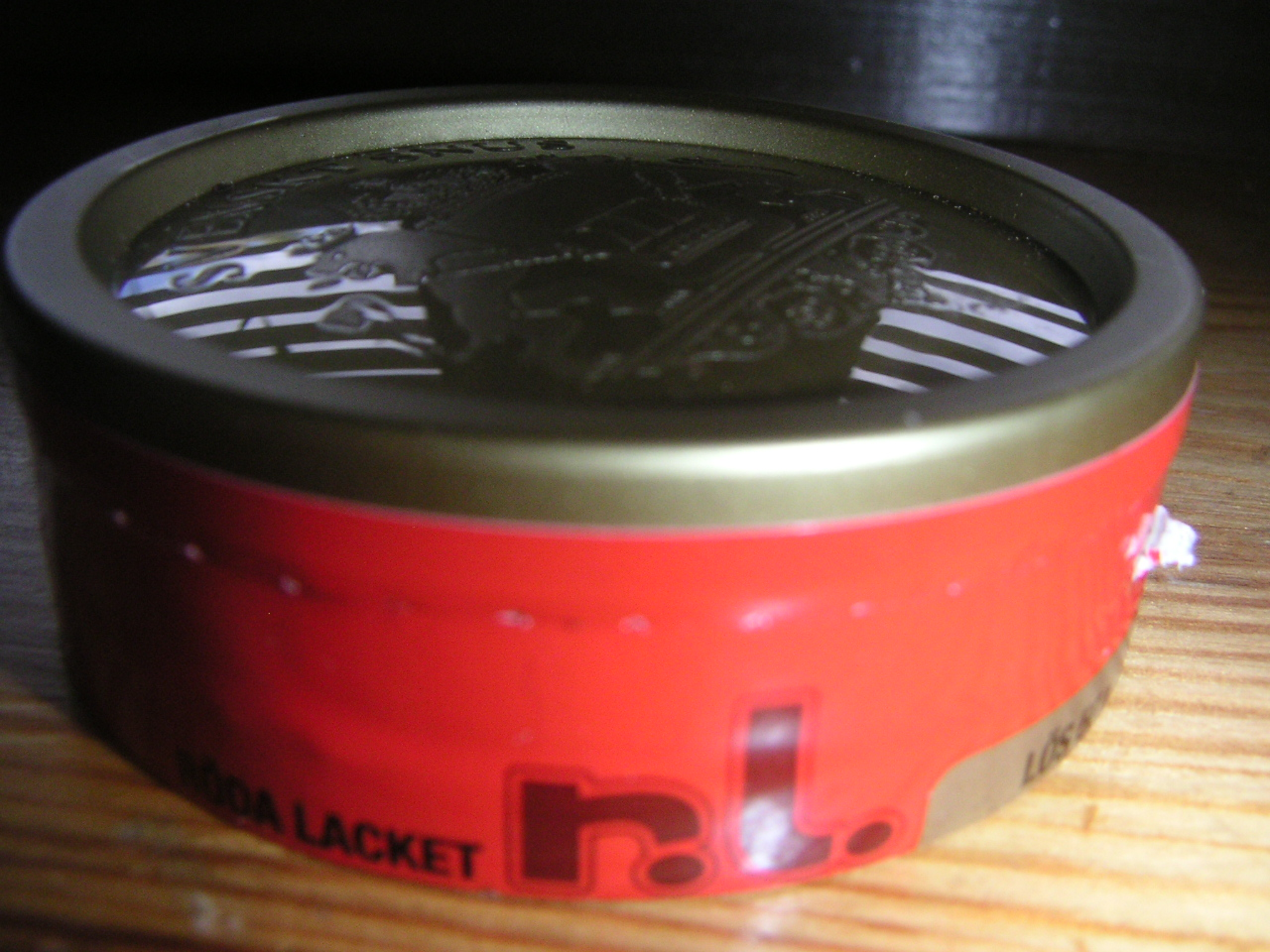
Röda Lacket Lössnus (2007)

Röda Lacket is a popular brand of Swedish snus (moist snuff), a pasteurized smokeless tobacco product. It is made from a recipe invented in the 18th century. Registered in 1850, it's one of the oldest snus brands in existence.

== Origins ==
Petter Swartz (1726–1789) grew up in the Bergslagen mining region up north. When arriving at the town of Norrköping, he first introduced the Italian double-entry bookkeeping, then he started his own snus factory in 1753.

Together with his brother, Olof Swartz, they transformed the small business by implementing an efficient manufacturing process. Among other things, they constructed a horse-propelled grinder with a giant cog-wheel. Later they would use water for powering their factory complex. When production was at its peak, the Norrköping tobacco fields covered an area of almost 395000 square meters. Harvested tobacco was air cured in three large wooden barns.

Seven different recipes were the backbone of the Swartz empire. The most famous and also most successful was Röda Lacket (The Red Seal) which was soon sold in Stockholm and later all over the country.

== The company ==
The company, along with the snus recipes, was passed on from father to son through six generations. The family became very wealthy and started to contribute to the development of the town of Norrköping; most notably through financing the public library and the town's arts museum.

In 1772, Petter Swartz founded a private school where students were taught both double-entry bookkeeping and carpentry – skills that were needed in the snus business.

After the monopolization in 1915, the Swedish snus manufacturing was centralized. The success of Röda Lacket, however, delayed the closing of the tobacco harvesting in Norrköping by several years.

== Products ==
Röda Lacket has a mild, fruity taste, with tones of licorice. It's a fine-grain type of snus, which has earned it a reputation among Swedish snusers for being the easiest snus to hand mold. Today it is sold in one quality:

- Röda Lacket Vit Portion (discontinued) – a white portion snus in cans of 24 portions of 0,9 gram
- Röda Lacket Lössnus – loose snus; 42 grams per can
