= Food Act 2006 =

Swedish law

The Swedish Food Act (Swedish: Livsmedelslagen) is the law in Sweden that regulates food safety and handling, as well as labeling. The law was updated July 1, 2006, superseding the Swedish Food Act 1971. In addition to standard foodstuffs, the act also covers drinking water, snus and chewing tobacco, which are considered "food" for the purpose of the law.

The self-described purpose of the law is to "ensure a high level of protection for human health and for consumers' interests with regard to food." (translated)
