= Snus =

Moist tobacco product placed under the upper lip

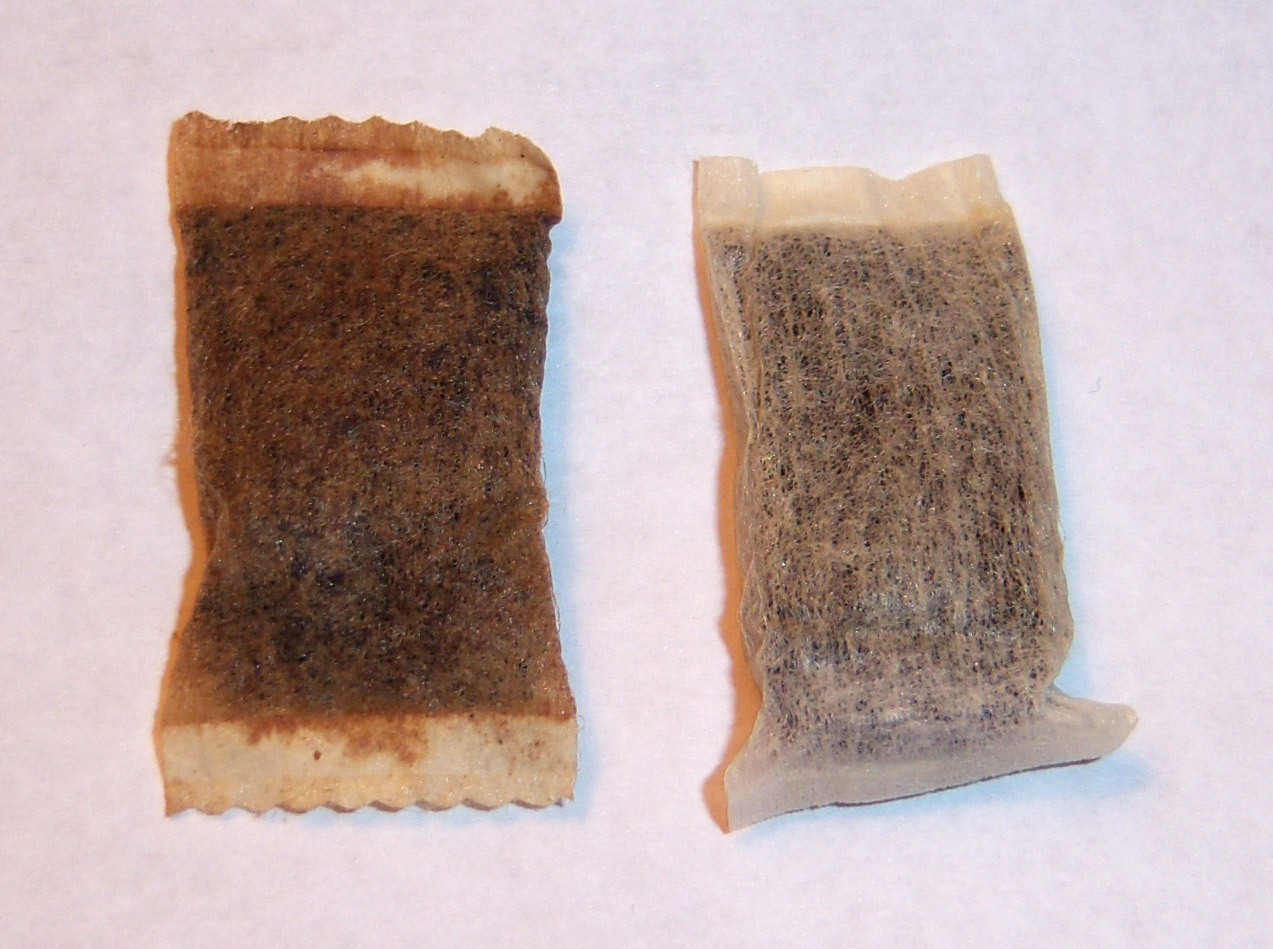
Original (left) and white (right) snus. The white version is dryer, with no added water, to last longer. The original version's added water creates a swifter effect.

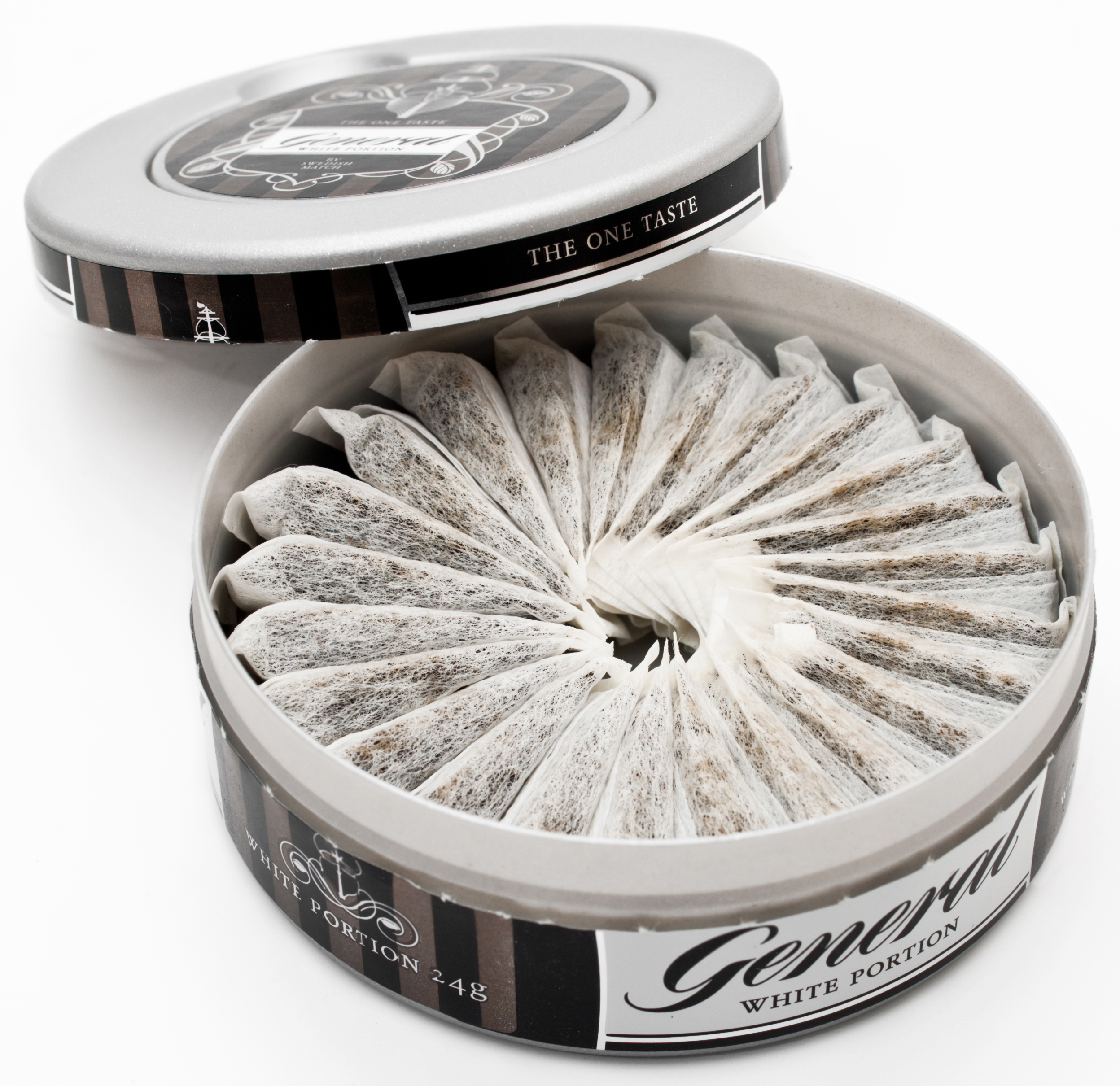
Tobacco-based snus of the Swedish brand General, marketed by Swedish Match

Snus (/snuːs/ SNOOSS; Swedish: [ˈsnʉːs]) is a Swedish tobacco product. It is consumed by placing a pouch of powdered tobacco leaves under the lip for nicotine to be absorbed through the oral mucosa. Snus, not to be confused with nicotine pouches, consists of ground up tobacco leaves, salt, an alkalizer (e.g. sodium carbonate, sodium bicarbonate) and (optionally) flavorings. The final product is sold as both loose tobacco, and in portions with the tobacco mixture contained in a small teabag-like pouch.

While "snus" in English generally refers specifically to the tobacco leaf product, in Swedish nicotine pouches are popularly referred to as vitt snus, literally "white snus"; snus can be referred to as brunt snus, "brown snus", to distinguish it.

The manufacturing process of snus differs from that of other oral tobacco products. Snus tobacco is heated and pasteurized rather than cured or fermented, resulting in a less harmful product which contains a lower concentration of TSNA carcinogens in comparison to other traditional tobacco products. Though research on the connection between snus and disease such as cancer is not conclusive, and some studies find no associations between snus consumption and an increased risk of cancer, some do suggest a link to risk of oral and pharyngeal cancer.

The warning text "causes cancer" was removed from snus packaging in Sweden and other countries because scientific evidence indicates that the cancer risk associated with snus is significantly lower than that of smoking. The shift in labeling aims to provide accurate information while still cautioning consumers about potential health concerns.

Nicotine products in general have been linked to reproductive harms such as stillbirth, premature birth, and low birth weight. Conversely, non-tobacco-based nicotine pouches (also known as "nic pouches") are classified as non-carcinogenic since nicotine itself is not a carcinogen. However, they are still harmful to cardiovascular health due to their nicotine content, and are associated with moderately higher risk of cardiovascular disease, stroke, and reproductive harms. The main causes for mortality from smoking including cardiovascular disease from the effects of smoke on vascular coagulation and blood vessel walls are not caused primarily by nicotine and hence not to be considered equal to the moderate cardiovascular health risks from nicotine pouches.

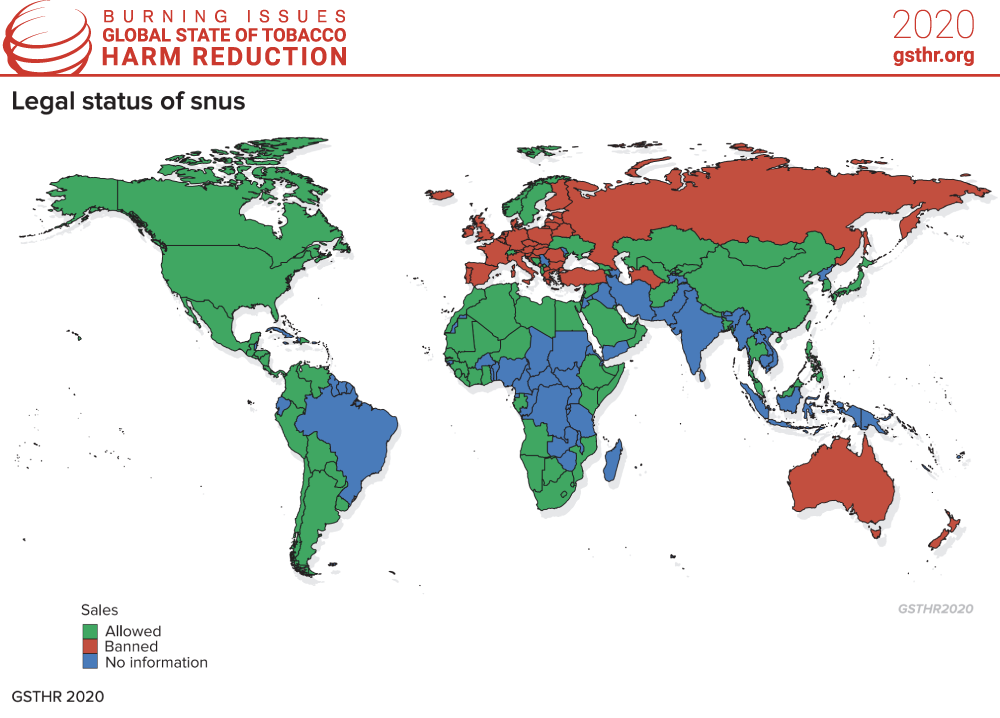
Legal status of tobacco-based snus. The sale of tobacco-based snus is banned in the EU (except in Sweden).

The sale of tobacco-based snus is illegal in several countries, including Australia, New Zealand and all European Union (EU) countries except for Sweden. Non-tobacco nicotine pouches are presently not regulated at EU-level and are the most common type of tobacco product in Sweden and are also available in Switzerland. Some European countries, such as the United Kingdom, Ireland and Estonia, allow the sale of non-tobacco-based snus. Snus is also available in the United States.

== Overview ==
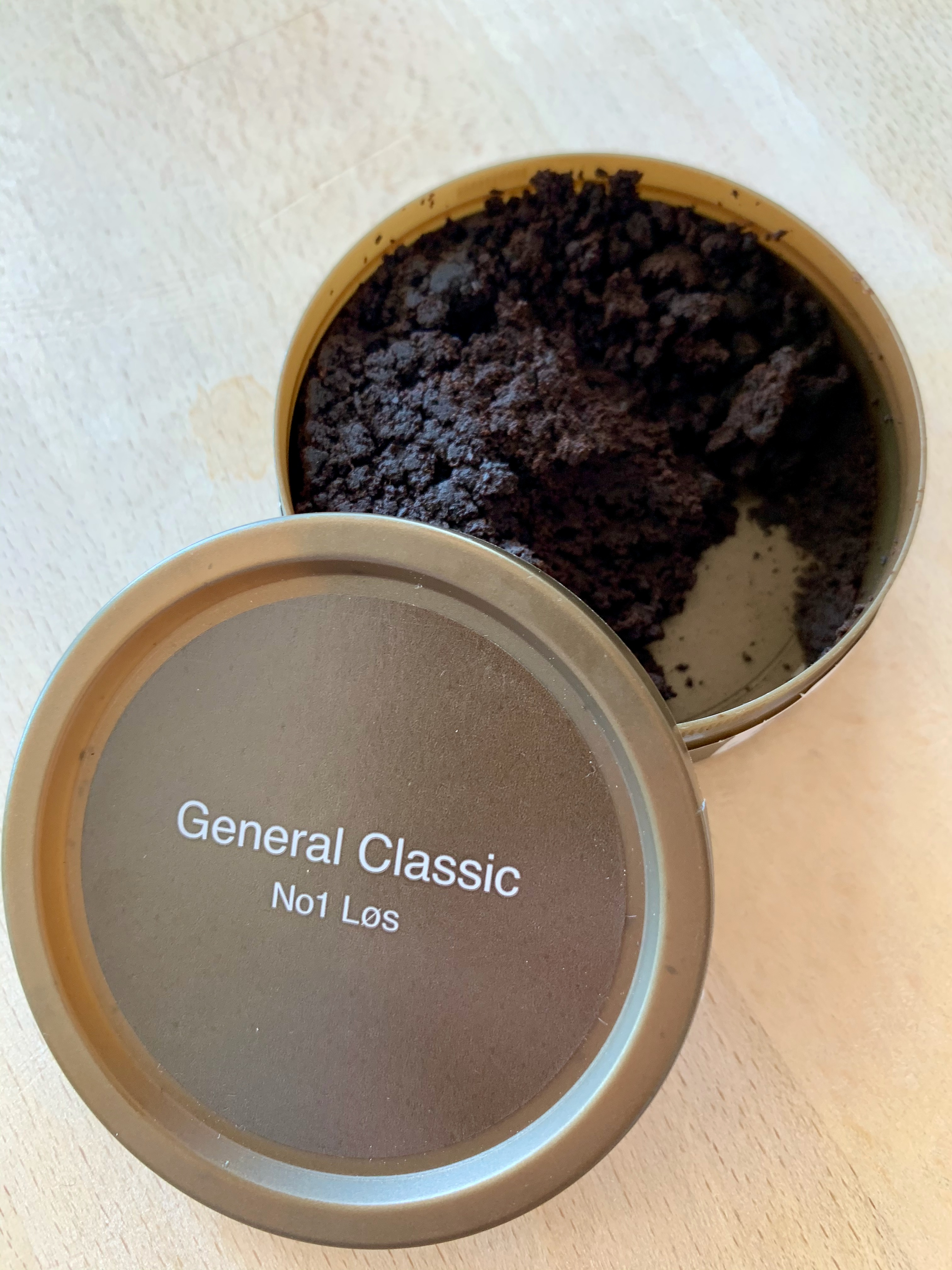
Lös Snus is a loose tobacco without the portion pouches.

Snus is made from air-dried/pasteurized tobaccos from various parts of the world. In earlier times, tobacco for making snus was laid out for drying in Scania and Mälardalen, Sweden. Later, Kentucky tobaccos were used. The ground tobacco is mixed with water, salt, an alkalizing agent such as sodium carbonate or sodium bicarbonate (E500), and aroma, and is prepared through heating under pressure. After the heating process, food grade aromas are typically added. In Sweden, tobacco for oral use, snus is regulated, and was assumed under the Swedish Food Act in 1971.

For this reason, all ingredients are listed on the label of each individual package (can) of snus. Moist snus contains more than 50% water, and the average use of snus in Sweden is approximately 800 grams (16 units) per person each year. In 2024, 22% of men and 10% of women aged 16-84 in Sweden reported daily snus use.About 12% (1.1 million people) of the population in Sweden use snus. Unlike dipping tobacco and chew, most snus does not undergo the fermentation process, but is instead steam-pasteurized. Pasteurization inhibits the growth of bacteria that facilitate the formation of tobacco-specific nitrosamines, while preserving the desired texture and mouthfeel of the snus. The absorption of nicotine, the desired primary alkaloid in tobacco, greatly depends on the nicotine content in the snus and the pH of the final product.

Snus is sold in containers of various sizes, originally made of porcelain, wood, silver, or gold. Portioned snus usually comes in plastic tins of 20 to 24 portions, containing about 0.75 to 1 gram of snus each, while loose snus is mostly sold in wax coated cardboard containers with plastic lids (similar to dip snuff), at 42 g (50 g before 2008). Mini-portion and medium-portion snus are increasingly popular formats. Most of these products come in tins containing 20 portions, of either 0.65 or 0.5 grams each for a total of just under 13 or 10 grams, particularly with those for whom concealing their use of smokeless tobacco in places is of utmost importance.

Snus is available in two main types:

- Loose snus (Swedish: lössnus) is a moist powder that can be shaped into a cylindrical or spherical form using the fingertips or a specialized cylindrical device. This final product is commonly known as a pris ('pinch'), buga, prilla, or prell (slang). Some individuals, particularly long-time users, opt to simply pinch the tobacco and place it under their upper lip (known as a farmer's pinch or living snus). Swedish consumption research has analyzed loose and pouched snus separately, since portion size and grams consumed per day can differ by product form. However, the popularity of loose snus has gradually been overtaken by portioned alternatives.
- Portion snus (Swedish: portionssnus) is a convenient and discreet form of snus that comes in small teabag-like sachets filled with moist powder. It is available in smaller quantities compared to loose powder snus. There are two varieties of portion snus:
  - Original portion: This traditional form was introduced in 1973. The sachet material is moisturized during manufacturing, resulting in a brown, moist pouch.
  - White portion: This form has a milder taste and slightly slower release. The sachet material is not moisturized during manufacturing, resulting in a white, dry pouch. The tobacco within the portion material has the same moisture content as original portion snus, but the nicotine and flavor are delivered somewhat slower due to the drier sachet. Notably, "white portion" refers to the style, not the color. Some white portion snus use a black material instead of white, yet are still considered "white portion". Examples of such snus include General Onyx, Grovsnus Svart (Black), and Blue Ocean (Blue).
  - The Stingfree portion is a patented pouch for snus and modern oral nicotine pouches, approved in the US and Europe. It features a protective side that effectively reduces the burning sensation and irritation on the user's gum and oral mucosa.

Portioned snus comes in three sizes: mini, normal/large, and maxi. The weights vary, but most packages disclose the net weight. Mini portions weigh around 0.5 g, normal portions weigh 0.8 to 1 g, and maxi portions weigh up to 1.7 g. Some brands offer regular and long versions of the normal size sachet.

The nicotine content varies among brands, with the most common strength being 8 mg per gram of tobacco. Stark (Swedish for "strong") and extra stark varieties have higher nicotine content, with stark varieties containing 11–14 mg and extra stark varieties containing up to 22 mg. Siberia brand has an "Extremely Strong" snus with 43 mg of nicotine per gram of tobacco, the highest available.

=== Legal status ===
==== European Union ====
EU law classifies snus as "tobacco for oral use", under Directive 2014/4-/EU, covering oral tobacco products in powder or particulate form, including sachet portions or porous sachets, but excluding products intended to be inhaled or chewed. The sale of snus is prohibited in all European Union member states except Sweden. Under the European Union Tobacco Products Directive, "tobacco for oral use" may not be placed on the market within the EU; Sweden is exempt from the prohibition under the terms of its accession to the European Union.

In its 2021 report on the application of the Tobacco Products Directive, the European Commission stated that the ban had been circumvented in some cases by snus-like products being presented as chewing tobacco.

International tobacco-control guidance generally treats smokeless tobacco products as part of a broader tobacco-control regulation, including measures relating to packaging, health warnings, advertising, taxation, and youth access. The World Health Organization's (WHO) 2025 position on tobacco control and harm reduction identified smokeless tobacco products, nicotine pouches, electronic cigarettes, and heated tobacco products as products for which minimum regulatory measures are needed to protect public health.

==== Sweden ====
In Sweden, tobacco for oral use, snus, and chewing tobacco are regulated under the Act on Tobacco and Similar Products as well as within the framework of food legislation. Packaging information for smokeless tobacco products sold directly to consumers in Sweden must be provided in Swedish and be clearly legible. During the reporting period, the snus ban was clearly circumvented as, outside of Sweden, many snus-like products were presented as chewing tobacco to gain a legal status. Legal loopholes related to chewing bags and emerging nicotine pouches became apparent.

===== Swedish voluntary standards =====
In the 1990s, a voluntary quality standard for snus products was introduced (Gothiatek) that set maximum levels for certain controversial constituents including nitrosamines, heavy metals, and polyaromatic hydrocarbons. The GothiaTek standard was developed for selected constituents in Swedish snus and has since been accepted by the European Smokeless Tobacco Council (ESTOC) trade organization as an industrial standard.

==== United States ====
In the United States, certain General Snus products have received Food and Drug Administration (FDA) modified-risk tobacco product authorizations permitting specified reduced-risk claims relative to cigarette smoking. In November 2024, the FDA renewed modified-risk tobacco product orders for several General Snus products.

==== Other countries ====
In New Zealand, oral nicotine products may not be imported for retail sale or distribution unless approved as a medicine or psychoactive substance. New Zealand regulations contain package-message and prohibited-feature requirements for smokeless tobacco products.

In Switzerland, the Tobacco Products Act and Tobacco Products Ordinance entered into force on 1 October 2024 and regulate tobacco products and other nicotine products, including non-combustible products.

Norway's tobacco-control strategy covers both tobacco and nicotine products and includes objectives aimed at reducing daily snus use and preventing tobacco- and nicotine-product use among younger age groups.

=== Usage ===
Snus is typically used by being placed under the upper lip. This is true for both loose snus and portion snus. The pris (pressed pellet of loose snus) or pouch is typically left in place for anywhere between 30 and 120 minutes. No spitting is required, but some (especially new users) may prefer to.

Snus is not cured, so it can spoil much faster than cured tobacco. While tobacco-based snus is typically refrigerated for short term storage (up to a few months), it is typically frozen for longer term storage of a year or more. It can stay unrefrigerated for a week or more without spoilage. Some tobacco-based snus products are shipped very dry, so they have extended shelf life without needing any refrigeration. This makes them slower to initially "drip", as there is no appreciable moisture in the packet.

=== Differences with other oral tobacco products ===
Public health surveys may group several smokeless products together, including chewing tobacco, dip, snuff, moist snuff, snus, and dissolvable tobacco, even though they differ including in placement, use, and product form.

Some forms of tobacco consumed in the mouth may be categorized as:

Swedish snus
A moist form of smokeless tobacco which is usually placed under the upper lip, and which does not result in the need for spitting. It is sold either as a moist powder known as loose snus, or packaged into pouches known as portion snus. Snus is often mildly flavored with food-grade smoke aroma, bergamot, citrus, juniper berry, herbs and/or floral flavors. Most Scandinavian snus is produced in Sweden and regulated as food under the Swedish Food Act.
American snus
American snus products are similar to the Scandinavian form but are not considered equivalents. Published chemical comparisons have found that sampled US products differ from Northern European products in moisture, pH levels, nicotine availability, tobacco-specific nitrosamines (TSNAs), and flavor compounds. American snus is often flavored, e.g., with spearmint, wintergreen, vanilla or fruit (e.g. cherry), and may contain sugar.
Nasal snuff
Mostly English, German, and Scandinavian, this is referred to as luktsnus in Swedish and luktesnus in Norwegian, and as "Scotch snuff" in the US, is a dry, powdered form of snuff. It is insufflated – "sniffed" but not deeply "snorted" – through the nose. It is often mentholated or otherwise scented.
Chewing tobacco
North American and European product, also known as chew (or in some Southern US dialects as chaw or dip). It is tobacco in the form of short or long, loose leaf and stem strands (like pipe tobacco or longer), or less commonly of chopped leaves and stems compressed into blocks called plugs, or even finely ground pieces compressed into pellets. A few brands are cut into much finer loose strands, like cigarette rolling tobacco. Chew is placed between the cheek and the gums, or actively chewed. It causes copious salivation, especially when chewed, and due to its irritant (even nauseating) effect on the esophagus, this "juice" usually requires spitting. Chewing tobacco is a long-established North American form of tobacco (derived from traditional use of raw tobacco leaf by Indigenous peoples of the Americas), and is also legal in the European Union. Chewing tobacco is sometimes flavored, e.g. with wintergreen, apple, or cherry.
Dipping tobacco
Also known as dip, spit tobacco or, ambiguously, as moist snuff, this is a common American form of tobacco. It is moist, and somewhat finely ground, but less so than snus. Dipping tobacco (so called because users dip their fingers into the package to pinch a portion to insert into the mouth) is placed between the lower lip or cheek and the gums; it is not used nasally. As with chewing tobacco, salivation is copious, and usually spat out. Dipping tobacco is usually flavored, traditionally with wintergreen or mint, though many other flavorings are now available, while some unflavored brands remain popular. Beginning in the mid-1980s, several brands have packaged American dipping tobacco in porous pouches like those used for many brands of Scandinavian and American snus.
Chema
This Algerian product is a moist tobacco similar to Scandinavian snus in many respects. Scientific literature describes Chemma as an oral moist snuff used in Algeria, prepared from ground tobacco mixed with inorganic salts or other plant materials. Outside of Algeria, it is most widely known as "Makla", a name that originates from the Algerian brand "Makla El Hilal", which first produced this type of smokeless tobacco during the French colonization. It is placed in the upper lip in a manner similar to snus; it differs in that it is more finely ground and has an even higher nicotine content and pH level. In a 2023 analysis of 27 Algerian smokeless-tobacco samples, total nicotine in manufactured products was reported at 3.9 to 12.6mg/g dry weight. Sales within the European Union are legal due to its classification as a chewing tobacco. Its safety in comparison to snus has not been studied sufficiently.
Naswar
A central Asian product which is a moist, powdered form of tobacco, often green and sometimes caked with the mineral lime and/or wood ash. It is used like dipping tobacco or put under the tongue, and is pungent and often heavily flavored, e.g. with culinary oils (cardamom, sesame), the fruit lime, menthol, etc. Naswar contains nicotine, which can lead to addiction, and its use has been associated with increased risks of oral cancers, gum disease, and cardiovascular issues due to the presence of tobacco-specific nitrosamines and other harmful chemicals.

Snus, dry snuff, and dipping tobacco are distinct products that some English speaking people may refer to as snuff but are all processed and used in very different ways, each with their own sets of risks.

=== Health risks ===
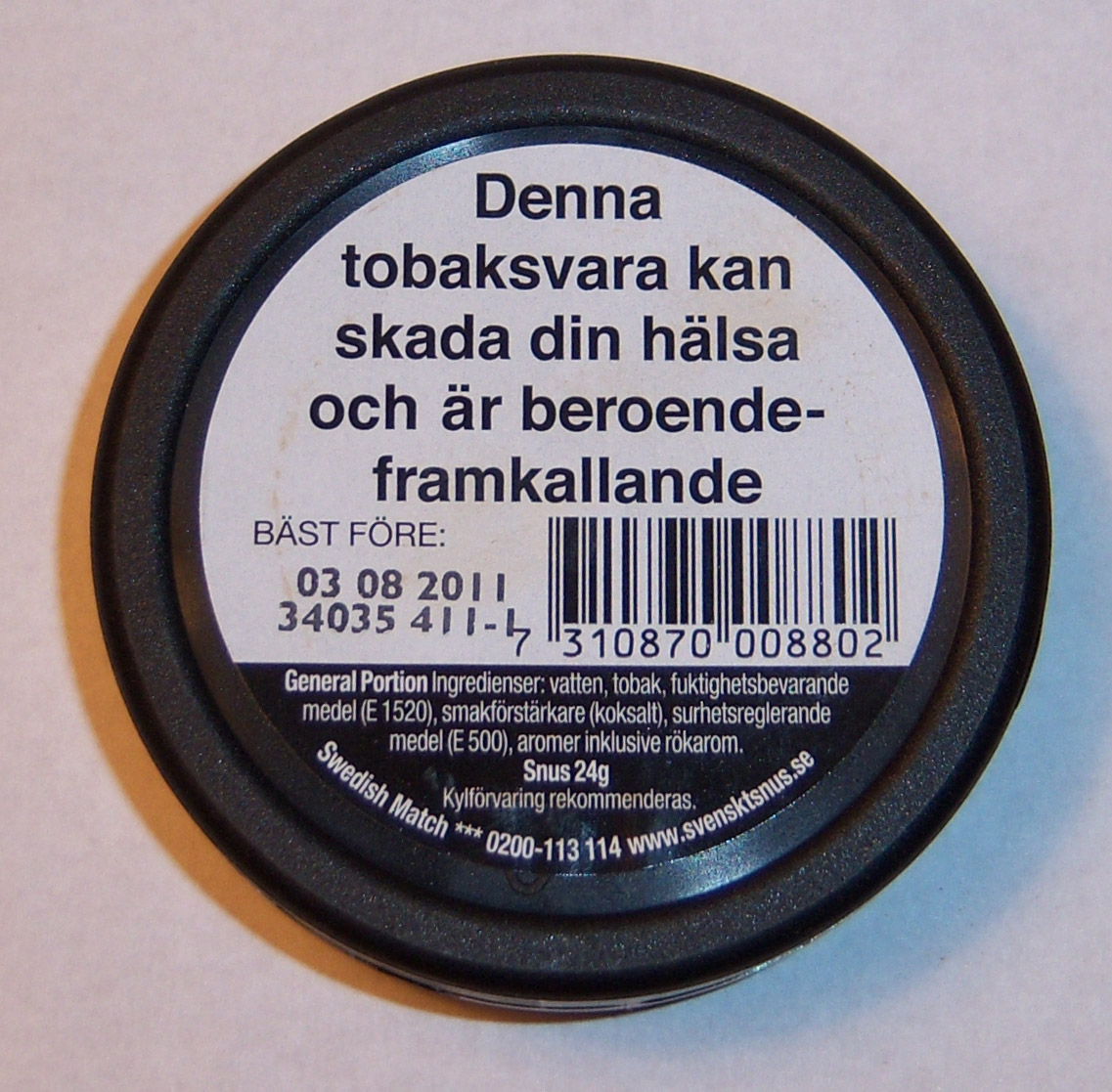
Warning label on a container of Swedish snus. The text reads: "This tobacco product may damage your health and is addictive". Note the "best before" date and list of ingredients, which is required by Swedish law.

Various national and international health organizations state that using snus is addictive, represents a health risk, has no safe level use, and is not a safe substitute for smoking. Unlike smoked tobacco products, snus is used orally and is not burned or inhaled, so its risk profile is generally discussed separately from the risks caused by inhaling tobacco smoke. However, snus still contains nicotine and is addictive.

The Public Health Agency of Sweden states that tobacco and nicotine products are addictive, with particular concern for children and young people. Evidence on cancer risk from Swedish snus is less conclusive than for smoked tobacco, but using snus can cause a number of adverse health effects such as esophageal cancer, pancreatic cancer, stomach cancer, colorectal cancer, cardiovascular disease and stroke with confidence in the risk estimates ranging from moderate to very low. Evidence for cardiovascular effects is mixed. In one prospective Swedish cohort, current snus use was not associated with several major cardiovascular outcomes overall, but was associated with higher total and ischemic stroke risk among never-smokers.

A pooled analysis of Swedish never-smoking men also reported that current snus use was associated with increased all-cause and cardiovascular mortality. Snus has been associated with adverse reproductive effects including stillbirth, premature birth, and low birth weight. Nicotine in snus products that are used during pregnancy can affect how a baby's brain develops in the womb.

Despite its addictive nature, nicotine in snus is not considered as harmful as the toxic byproducts of tobacco smoke. Cigarette smoking, which delivers nicotine by burning tobacco and inhaling smoke, is a leading preventable cause of disease and death. Most smoking-related harm is attributed to toxic chemicals in tobacco smoke, rather than to nicotine itself. Quitting snus use is as challenging as smoking cessation. There is no scientific evidence that using snus can help a person quit smoking, although widespread snus-usage is correlated with lower rates of smoking.

== Adolescent and youth use ==
The prevalence of snus use among adolescents and young adults has been monitored in several Nordic countries. In Sweden, national public health surveys have reported increases in daily tobacco snus use among people aged 16-29 years. The increase in daily usage was particularly evident among women, rising from 3% in 2018 to 18% in 2024.

In Norway, school-based surveys have reported increasing use of snus among adolescents over recent years. ESPAD data for 15-16 year olds showed that ever-use of snus rose from 20% in 2019 to 28% in 2024, while daily or occasional use rose from 12% to 14% in the same period.

In Finland, school health surveys have reported declining use of tobacco snus alongside increasing use of tobacco-free nicotine pouches among adolescents. From 2023 to 2025, nicotine pouch use rose sharply, reaching 24% among vocational school boys and 15% among vocational school girls, while the use of tobacco snus had decreased.

In Denmark, a 2024 national survey reported that 14% of people aged 15-29 used smokeless nicotine pouches, a category including snus and nicotine pouches.

Ireland's 2024 ESPAD survey of 15-16 year old student substance use, 10% reported the use of moist snuff and 7.6% reported use of nicotine pouches, with prevalence higher in male students.

== Littering ==
Snus-related litter has also been recorded outside urban areas. In 2025 measurements conducted along Swedish mountain hiking trails, snus was reported as the most common litter category and accounted for 25% of collected litter.

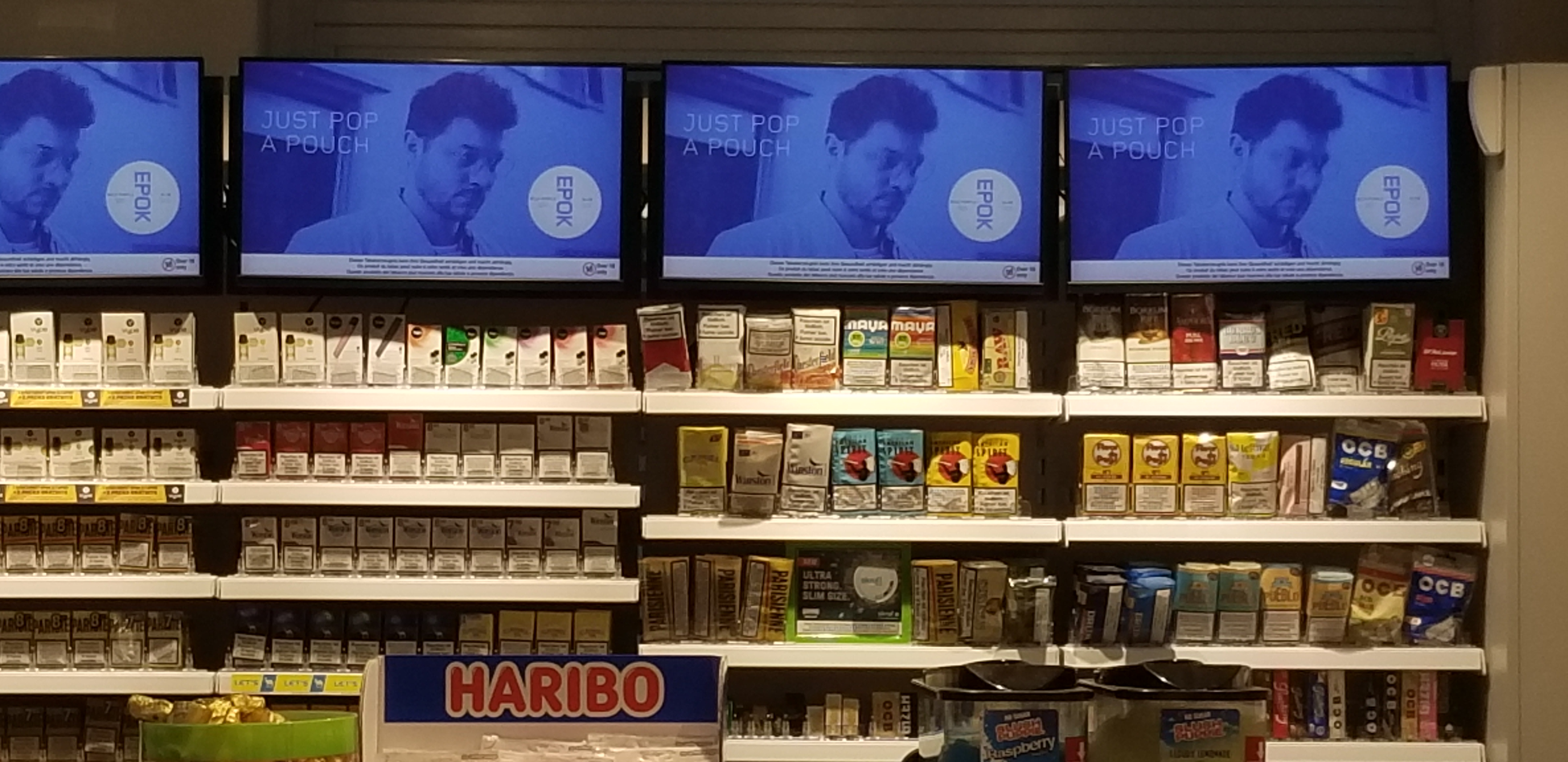
Tobacco shop in Neuchâtel, Switzerland in 2020: Advertising for tobacco (here for snus Epok from British American Tobacco) is authorized inside the shop.

== History ==
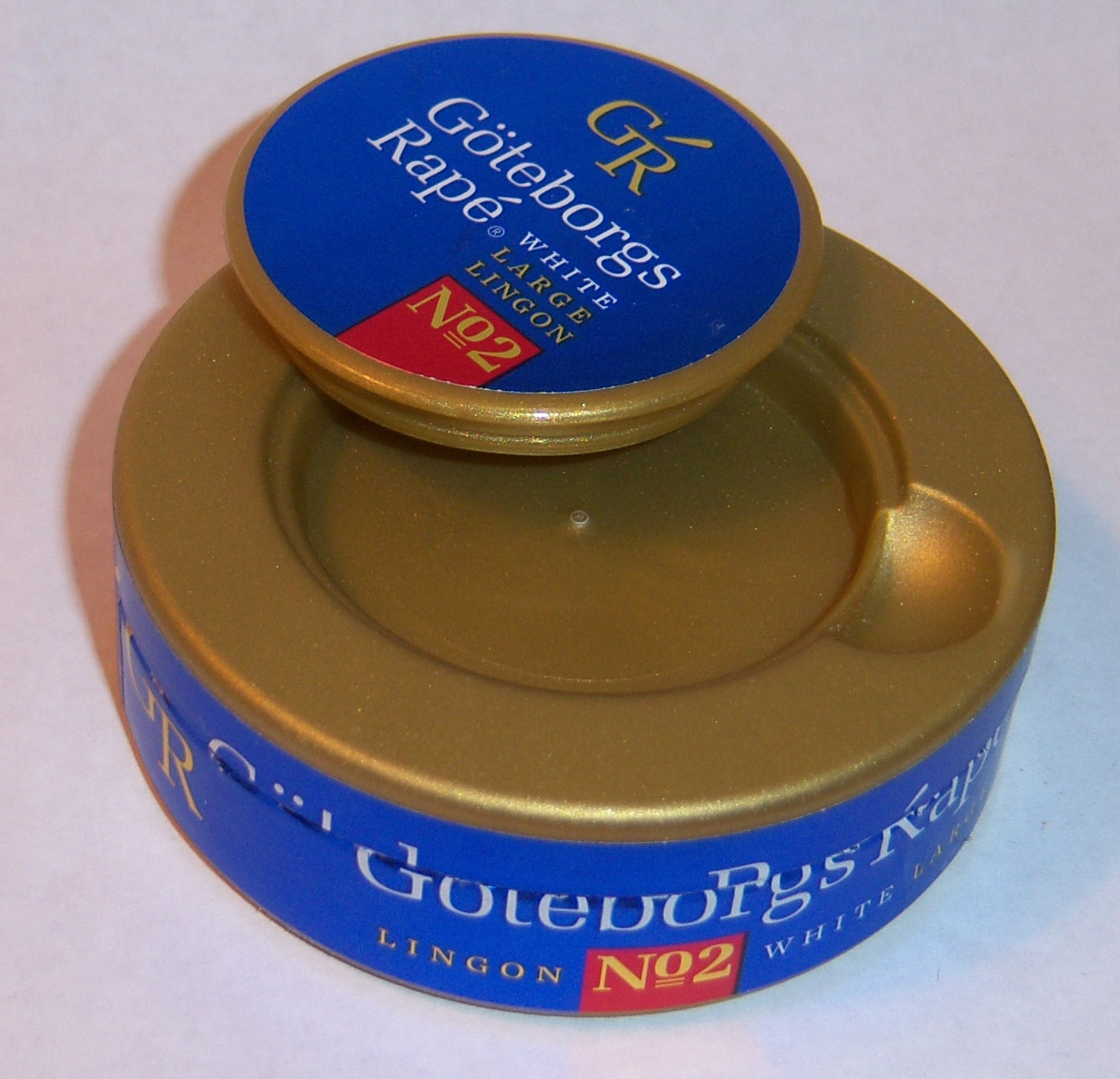
Catch lid found on many snus tins, which snaps in and out of place. The small compartment is typically used for the temporary storage of used snus portions.

Snus has a long history of use, reaching back to the 16th century and concentrated in Sweden. Its origin lies in an invention by Jean Nicot (1530–1600), a French diplomat residing in Portugal who cultivated tobacco in his garden, and was one of the pioneers in recognizing the medicinal properties of tobacco. Nicot is also the originator of the word nicotine. Nicot meticulously dried and ground the tobacco leaves into a fine powder, which could be inhaled as snuff. He presented this powder to Catherine de' Medici (1519–1589), the Queen of France, in an effort to alleviate her migraines. The use of snuff quickly gained popularity among the French court and the upper-class citizens, becoming a fashionable trend. By the early 17th century, the practice of using nasal snuff had also spread to Sweden.

Tobacco use became so prevalent in Sweden that in 1724, King Fredrik I issued a decree mandating that Swedes cultivate their own tobacco. Consequently, farmers and homesteaders started grinding their own locally grown tobacco.

In the early nineteenth century, Swedish consumers increasingly shifted from nasal snuff to moist snus. Many farmers produced their own snus from locally grown tobacco, grinding it using coffee grinders or hand-carved snus mills. The final product was then portioned and placed under the lip for extended periods of time, eventually gaining popularity as snus.

Ettan is the oldest still extant snus brand, which dates to 1822. Its founder, Jakob Fredrik Ljunglöf, introduced pasteurization into snus making, reducing production time by several weeks and preventing microbial contamination. In the years that followed, numerous manufacturers further improved of snus manufacturing, leading to the flourishing of many brands. Several of these brands from that era continue to exist.

In 1914, the Swedish parliament nationalised the entire tobacco industry. This led to the transformation of numerous tobacco companies into the state-owned monopoly known as AB Svenska Tobakmonopolet. As a result, the number of available tobacco products decreased significantly from approximately four hundred local brands to just seventeen, although these were now distributed nationwide. Consequently, employment within the industry experienced a fifty percent decline.

Sweden abolished the import and sales monopoly on tobacco products in 1961 and the manufacturing monopoly in 1967. AB Svenska Tobaksmonopolet later merged with the match manufacturer Swedish Match and was listed on the stock market in 1996.

In 1971, snus became subject to the Swedish Food Act, a regulatory change later associated with expanded quality-control standards in Swedish snus manufacturing.

== See also ==
- Health effects of snus
- Nicotine pouch
- Pituri
- Röda Lacket
