= Jacob Ljunglöf =

Swedish tobacco producer

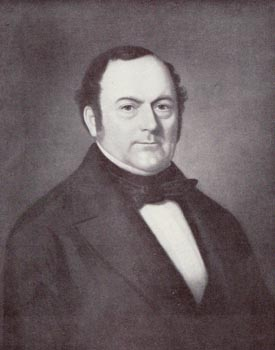
Picture of Jacob Fredrik Ljunglof

Jacob Fredrik Ljunglöf (1796 – 1860) was a Swedish tobacco producer who took over a slow-going tobacco factory in Stockholm in 1826. The factory was put back to standard and the efficiency was increased. Until the late 1820s, it was the leading tobacco factory in Sweden. In 1839, Ljunglöf started producing cigars and cigarettes in addition to tobacco and chewing tobacco. When he died, Ljunglöf had become one of the richest men in Sweden.
