= Health effects of nicotine =

Chemical structure of nicotine

Nicotine is an alkaloid found primarily in plants of the nightshade family, notably in tobacco; it is also synthesized. Nicotine is used recreationally for its stimulant and anxiolytic effects.

In humans, nicotine acts primarily as a stimulant by binding to and activating nicotinic acetylcholine receptors (nAChRs) in the central nervous system and peripheral tissues. This results in the release of neurotransmitters such as dopamine, acetylcholine, and norepinephrine, producing effects including increased alertness, reduced anxiety, and mild euphoria. Nicotine is typically consumed through tobacco smoking, vaping, or other nicotine delivery systems.

== Effects on brain development ==
Exposure to nicotine, from conventional or electronic cigarettes during adolescence can impair the developing human brain. E-cigarette use is recognized as a substantial threat to adolescent behavioral health. Furthermore, youth and young adults are more vulnerable than adults to the long-term consequences of nicotine exposure, including susceptibility to nicotine addiction and potentially reduced impulse control, deficits in attention and cognition, and mood disorders.

The use of tobacco products, no matter what type, is almost always started and established during adolescence when the developing brain is most vulnerable to nicotine addiction. (Note: A 2018 review found "Nicotine is the third most commonly used substance by adolescents and use of electronic cigarettes has become twice as popular as traditional tobacco products. Concomitantly, e-cigarettes have been found to increase the risk for transitioning to more traditional tobacco cigarettes. Although acute administration of nicotine may enhance cognition in teens and young adults, especially memory and attention, chronic use has been linked with attention and working memory deficits in teens. Acute withdrawal from nicotine in adolescent users has also been associated with abnormal reward processing, working memory, and verbal memory fMRI tasks, highlighting the necessity to measure last use of nicotine prior to neurocognitive assessment.") Young people's brains build synapses faster than adult brains. Because addiction is a form of learning, adolescents can get addicted more easily than adults. The nicotine in e-cigarettes can also prime the adolescent brain for addiction to other drugs such as cocaine.

== Effects during Pregnancy ==
Nicotine exposure during pregnancy is associated with adverse effects on fetal development. Nicotine may contribute to impaired fetal growth, preterm birth through effects on placental function and uteroplacental blood flow. However, many adverse pregnancy outcomes associated with cigarette smoking also result from exposure to combustion products and other toxic substances in tobacco smoke.

Clinical guidelines recommend assessing tobacco use and secondhand smoke exposure throughout pregnancy because cessation at any stage can improve maternal and fetal outcomes, although quitting earlier provides the greatest benefit.

== Addiction to nicotine ==
Nicotine is addictive, and nicotine dependence is characterized by tolerance, physical dependence, psychological dependence, and nicotine withdrawal symptoms such as irritability, anxiety, and difficulty concentrating. Nicotine dependence and tobacco use often treated clinically as chronic, relapsing conditions that may require repeated intervention and longterm support. Repeated nicotine exposure produces neurobiological changes in brain reward and stress systems that contribute to the maintenance of nicotine and tobacco use despite knowledge of its adverse health consequences. Genetic variation, including differences in genes involved in nicotinic acetylcholine receptor function and nicotine metabolism, contributes to individual differences in susceptibility to nicotine dependence and smoking cessation outcomes.

A 1988 report of the U.S. Surgeon General concluded that cigarettes and other forms of tobacco are addictive and that nicotine is the drug in tobacco responsible for the development of addiction. Subsequent Surgeon General reports expanded the understanding of nicotine addiction, including the roles of nicotinic receptor subtypes, genetic susceptibility, adolescent vulnerability, associative learning, psychiatric comorbidity, and the processes underlying relapse and recovery.

According to studies by Henningfield and Benowitz, nicotine is more addictive than cannabis, caffeine, alcohol, cocaine, and heroin when considering both somatic and psychological dependence. However, due to the stronger withdrawal effects of alcohol, cocaine and heroin, nicotine may have a lower potential for somatic dependence than these substances.

Subsequent research has further clarified the neurobiological mechanisms underlying nicotine dependence. Nicotine dependence is reinforced through activation of nicotinic acetylcholine receptors, resulting in dopamine release and other neurochemical adaptations associated with reward, mood modulation, tolerance, withdrawal, and conditioned responses to cues associated with nicotine use.

Recent evidence indicates that nicotine dependence involves multiple interacting neural pathways beyond dopaminergic signaling alone, including circuits involved in reward, aversion, and withdrawal.

Although nicotine does play a role in acute episodes of some diseases (including stroke, impotence, and heart disease) by its stimulation of adrenaline release, which raises blood pressure, heart and respiration rate, and free fatty acids, the most serious longer- term effects are more the result of the products of tobacco smoking. This has led to the development of various nicotine delivery systems, such as the nicotine patch or nicotine gum, that can satisfy the addictive craving by delivering nicotine without the harmful combustion by-products. This can help the heavily dependent smoker to quit gradually while discontinuing further damage to health.

In the United States, an estimated 67.7% of adults who smoked in 2022 reported wanting to quit, 53.3% had made a quit attempt, and 8.8% had recently quit successfully. Globally, the World Health Organization estimated in 2024 that more than 750 million tobacco users wished to quit. In guidance published that year, it recommended a combination of behavioral support, digital cessation interventions, and pharmacological treatment for adults seeking to stop tobacco use.

== Nicotine in tobacco products ==
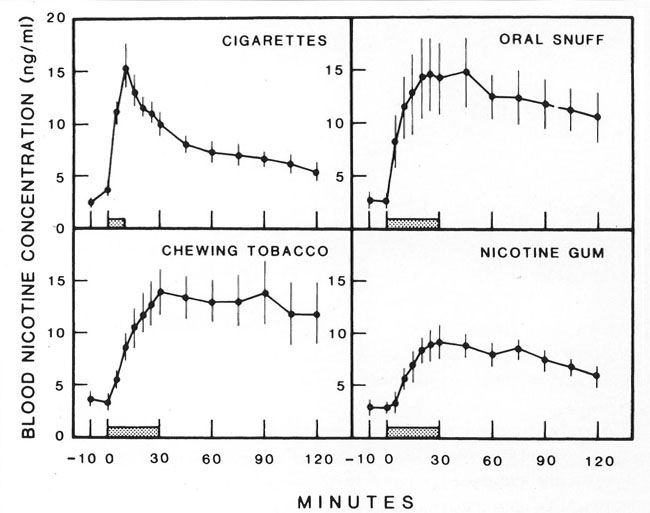
Absorption of nicotine depending on the type of the nicotine-containing product

The health effects of nicotine also depend on its delivery methods, nicotine concentration on the product and accompanying compounds.

=== Smoking ===
When tobacco is smoked, most of the nicotine is pyrolyzed; a dose sufficient to cause mild somatic dependency and mild to strong psychological dependency remains. The amount of nicotine absorbed by the body from smoking depends on many factors, including the type of tobacco, whether the smoke is inhaled, and whether a filter is used. There is also a formation of harmane (a MAO inhibitor) from the acetaldehyde in cigarette smoke, which seems to play an important role in nicotine addiction probably by facilitating dopamine release in the nucleus accumbens in response to nicotine stimuli.

Inhalation is the most rapid and efficient method of delivering a compound into the bloodstream, second only to injection. This allows for the rapid feedback which supports the smokers' ability to titrate their dosage. On average, it takes about ten seconds for the substance to reach the brain. As a result of the efficiency of this delivery system, many smokers feel as though they are unable to cease. Those who achieve one year of continuous abstinence are highly likely to remain so, with the vast majority of relapses occurring within the first eight days after attempting cessation.

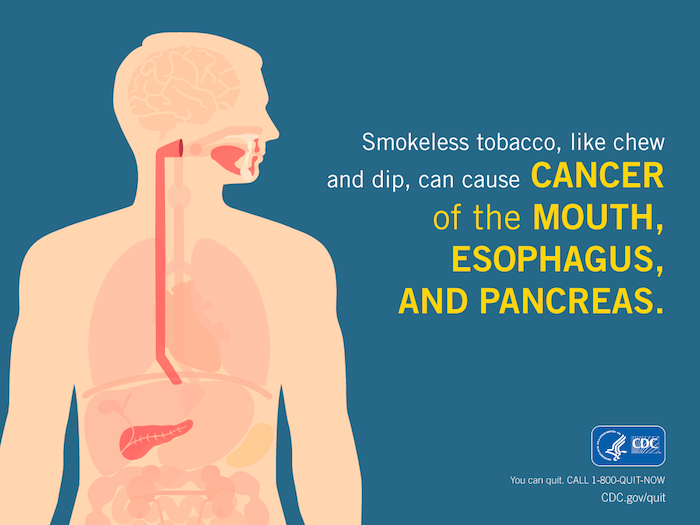
Graphic from the 2016 Centers for Disease Control and Prevention report entitled Smokeless Tobacco: Health Effects

An average cigarette yields about 2 mg of absorbed nicotine, a dose sufficient to produce reinforcement and dependence while remaining far below toxic levels.

Internationally, the World Health Organization Framework Convention on Tobacco Control (FCTC) provides a framework for measures including packaging and labelling requirements for tobacco products. Additional measures were adopted, including mandatory health warnings, regulation of nicotine-containing products, and, in some jurisdictions, proposals or requirements intended to reduce nicotine exposure of limit the addictiveness of cigarettes.

In the United States, the Family Smoking Prevention and Tobacco Control Act of 2009 gave the FDA authority to regulate tobacco products, providing the statutory basis for subsequent tobacco product standards, including proposed standards relating to nicotine content. For example, in January 2025, the U.S. Food and Drug Administration proposed a tobacco product standard that would limit nicotine levels in cigarettes and certain other combusted tobacco products to minimally or non-addictive levels, although, as of July 2026, the proposal had not been finalized.

=== Smokeless tobacco ===
Smokeless tobacco are tobacco products that is used by means other than smoking, for example by chewing, sniffing, or placing the product between gum and the cheek or lip.

Smokeless tobacco differs depending on the type of product, the types of tobacco used, and the amount of each tobacco type used within a product. Each variable results in a different level of nicotine. Furthermore, nicotine is absorbed by the body to different degrees depending on the pH level of the product, which is known as the free nicotine or unionized nicotine level.

The amounts of nicotine in saliva from using smokeless tobacco could be at amounts that can be toxic to cells in the oral cavity.

Smokeless tobacco (including products where tobacco is chewed) is a cause of oral cancer, oesophagus cancer, and pancreas cancer. Increased risk of oral cancer caused by smokeless tobacco is present in countries such as the United States but particularly prevalent in Southeast Asian countries where the use of smokeless tobacco is common.

== Nicotine replacement therapy ==
Nicotine replacement therapy (NRT) products, including gums, patches, and lozenges, deliver the compound in slower, lower doses than cigarettes and are used medically to help people quit smoking.

Licensed forms of nicotine replacement therapy have been found to increase long-term smoking cessation rates by approximately 50% to 60% compared with placebo or no NRT. Combination NRT, typically consisting of a nicotine patch together with a faster-acting formulation such as nicotine gum or lozenges, is more effective than a single form of NRT alone. These cessation medications usually include bupropion or varenicline.

Synthetic derivatives of nicotine, such as varenicline, act as partial agonists at nicotinic receptors and are also used as smoking cessation aids.

=== See also ===
- Health effects of tobacco smoking
- Health effects of electronic cigarettes
- Health effects of smokeless tobacco
