= Health effects of snus =

Health effects of a tobacco product

Snus is a Swedish tobacco product. It is consumed by placing a pouch of powdered tobacco leaves under the lip for nicotine to be absorbed through the oral mucosa.

The chemical constituents of different types of snus vary, and population-level studies suggest that the disease risks vary as well. Using snus is harmful to health, although much less than smoking tobacco.

== Snus and cancer: conflicting studies ==
A study of close to 10,000 Swedish, male construction workers published in the International Journal of Cancer in 2008 found a statistically significant increase in the incidence of the combined category of oral and pharyngeal cancer among daily users of snus. Other studies and opinion pieces in renowned journals, such as the British Medical Journal and The Lancet, do not confirm any correlation between snus usage and oral cancer, but one study suggests a probable increased risk of pancreatic cancer as a result of snus use. A pooled analysis of nine prospective studies involving more than 400,000 men and published in the International Journal of Cancer in 2017 found that use of snus was not associated with a greater risk for pancreatic cancer.

== Regulatory actions: EU's ban on snus ==
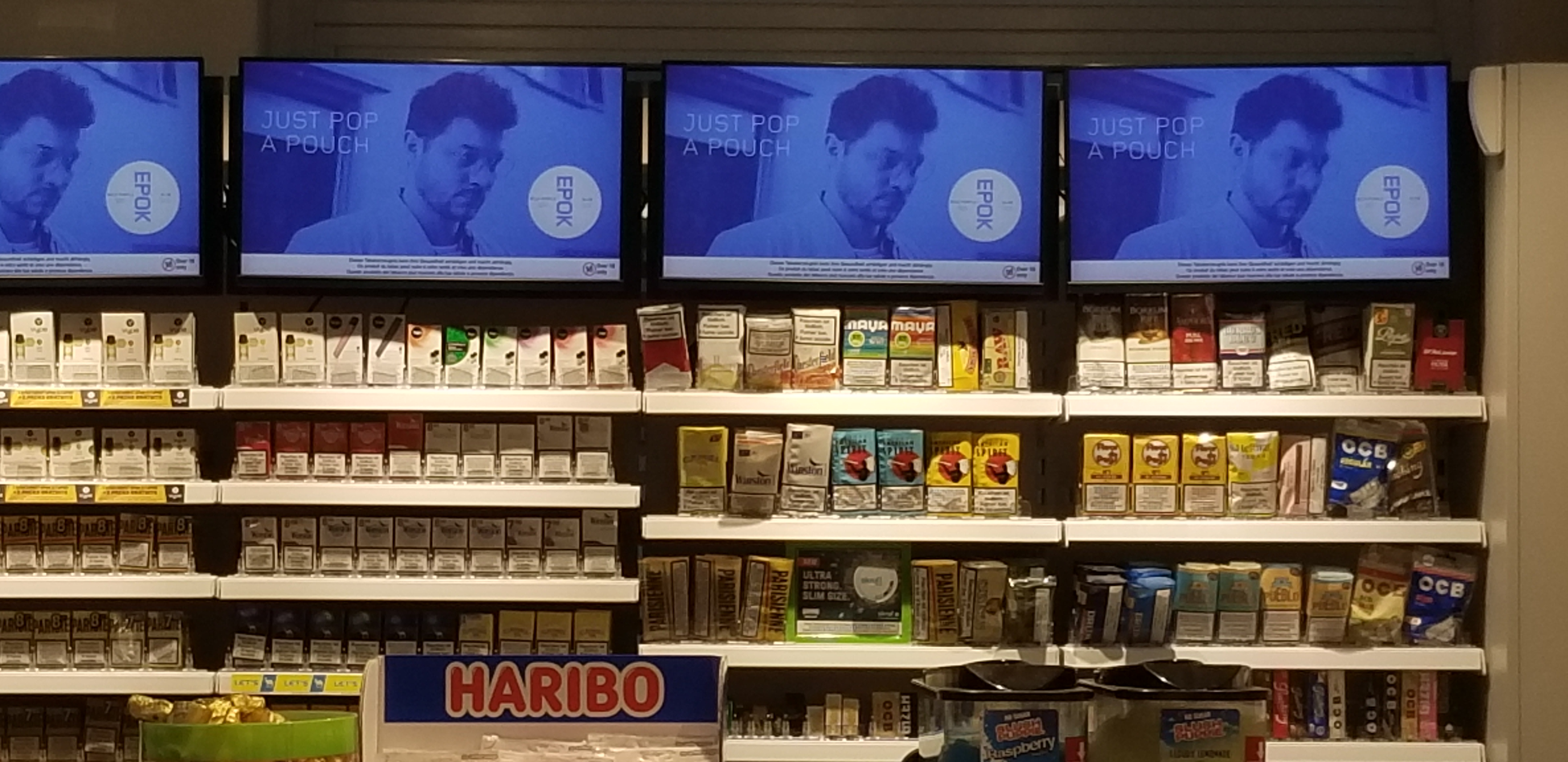
Tobacco shop in Neuchâtel, Switzerland in 2020: Advertising for tobacco (here for snus Epok from British American Tobacco) is authorized inside the shop.

The European Union banned the sale of snus in 1992, after a 1985 World Health Organization (WHO) study concluded that "oral use of snuffs of the types used in North America and western Europe is carcinogenic to humans", but a WHO committee on tobacco has also acknowledged the evidence is inconclusive regarding health consequences for snus consumers. Only Sweden and European Free Trade Association (EFTA)-member Norway are exempt from this ban. A popular movement during the run-up to the 1994 referendum for Sweden's EU membership made exemption from the EU sale ban of snus a condition of the membership treaty.

== Snus as a smoking substitute: arguments and repercussions ==
Recent actions by many European governments to limit the use of cigarettes has led to calls to lift the ban on snus, as it is generally considered to be less harmful than cigarette smoke, both to the user and to others.

== Regulatory changes and controversies in snus labeling ==
Snus manufacturer Swedish Match filed a modified risk tobacco product (MRTP) application with the U.S. Food and Drug Administration (FDA) Center for Tobacco Products to modify the warning label requirements by:

1. removing the current warnings, "This product can cause mouth cancer" and "This product can cause gum disease and tooth loss."
2. replacing the current warning, "This product is not a safe alternative to cigarettes", with "No tobacco product is safe, but this product presents substantially lower risks to health than cigarettes."
3. retaining the current warning, "Smokeless tobacco is addictive."

The FDA's Tobacco Products Scientific Advisory Committee voted against the request in April 2015 but Swedish Match is continuing their efforts for this change.

R. J. Reynolds has also filed an MRTP application with the FDA for its Camel snus product. As of May 2018, the FDA has yet to issue a ruling.

Medical journal The Lancet published a major study, "Global, regional, and national comparative risk assessment of 84 behavioural, environmental and occupational, and metabolic risks or clusters of risks, 1990–2016: a systematic analysis for the Global Burden of Disease Study 2016", in November 2017. The scientific conclusions with regard to snus was the following: "There is sufficient evidence that chewing tobacco and other products of similar toxicity cause excess risk of oral and oesophageal cancer while, at this time, existing evidence does not support attributing burden to snus or similar smokeless tobacco products." ...while for snus or snuff we did not find sufficient evidence of a RR (relative risk) greater than one for any health outcome." A relative risk [RR] of 1.0, means you are average — [there is no difference in risk between the control and experimental groups]".

== Snus in pregnancy and availability in the United States ==
During pregnancy and breastfeeding, mothers are advised not to use any products containing nicotine, which harms the fetus.

Scandinavian snus is regularly available, refrigerated, in the United States at smokeshops and select gas stations, especially in major cities. The considerably different, sweetened American snus is more commonly found at convenience stores, in multiple brands produced by US-based cigarette companies. Neither product category has made much of an inroad into the market-share held by the dipping tobacco products more common in that country.

== Effects of snus on oral microbiota ==
Snus has been scrutinized for its potential effect on oral microbiota. Oral microbiota, consisting of microorganisms in the oral cavity, plays a crucial role in maintaining oral health. Imbalances in oral microbiota can lead to oral health issues, with various factors, including tobacco use, influencing this balance.

While research has indicated that smoking significantly alters oral microbiota, studies on the effects of snus are limited. Preliminary studies suggest that snus may affect the composition and diversity of oral microbiota. Specifically, one study identified differences in the abundance of certain bacterial species between snus users and non-users.

Despite snus usage being associated with conditions like gum recession and tooth discoloration, the connection to severe oral health problems such as periodontal disease and oral cancer remains inconclusive. Nonetheless, snus contains harmful chemicals, including nicotine, which could negatively affect oral health. More research is needed to fully understand snus's effects on oral microbiota and its implications on oral health.

== Snus sensations: the role of nicotine and additives ==
The burning sensation often experienced with snus is caused by the nicotine itself (similar to the tingle of nicotine gum) and some food additives such as sodium carbonate (E500). Sodium carbonate is a food additive used to increase the pH of the tobacco (reduce the acidity). This increases the bioavailability of the nicotine, meaning more is available for absorption. Mucous membranes readily absorb free nicotine. Some flavorings (mints in particular) are astringent and may increase the tingling or burning sensation.

== Public health debate ==
=== Divergent views on harm reduction ===
There is some debate among public health researchers over the use of "safer" tobacco or nicotine delivery systems, generally dividing along two lines of thought. Some (primarily in the European Union and Canada) believe in "tobacco harm reduction", with the general belief that while it should remain a goal to reduce addiction to nicotine in the population as a whole, the reduction of harm to the health of those who choose to use nicotine is more pragmatic than the desire to reduce overall nicotine addiction. In other words, people using more harmful forms of tobacco (e.g., cigarettes) should be encouraged to switch to less harmful products (e.g., snus). The other school of thought is that no tobacco product should be promoted, and that attention should be placed instead on getting users to switch to nicotine replacement therapy or quit altogether.

=== Snus as a harm reduction tool: proponents' perspective ===
One proponent of using snus for harm reduction is Karl Fagerström, who has a PhD in psychology and is researcher in smoking cessation in Sweden. Some research available today shows snus use reduces or eliminates the risk of cancers associated with the use of other tobacco products, such as chewing tobacco (the type primarily used in the US and Canada, created in a process similar to cigarette tobacco) and cigarettes. The widespread use of snus by Swedish men (estimated at 30% of Swedish male ex-smokers), displacing tobacco smoking and other varieties of snuff, is thought to be responsible for the incidence of tobacco-related mortality in men being significantly lower in Sweden than any other European country. In contrast, since women traditionally are less likely to use snus, their rate of tobacco-related deaths in Sweden can be compared to that of other European countries.

Snus may be less harmful than other tobacco products (see above). According to Kenneth Warner, director of the University of Michigan Tobacco Research Network, "The Swedish government has studied this stuff to death and, to date, there is no compelling evidence that it has any adverse health consequences. ... Whatever they eventually find out, it is dramatically less dangerous than smoking."

=== Snus in the context of tobacco harm reduction ===
A 2014 report commissioned by Public Health England on another avenue for tobacco harm reduction, electronic cigarettes, examined the case of snus as "a unique natural experiment in the impact of a socially accepted, non-medical, affordable, and easily accessible reduced harm product on the prevalence of tobacco smoking". They concluded that "Although controversial, the Swedish natural experiment demonstrates that despite dual use and primary uptake of the reduced-harm product by young people, availability of reduced-harm alternatives for tobacco smokers can have a beneficial effect. While snus is not likely to become a legal or indeed politically viable option in the UK, this data proves the concept that harm reduction strategies can contribute to significant reductions in smoking prevalence."

=== Debates on snus use and life expectancy ===
Ongoing discussion and debates among primary scientific researchers of the effects of snus use on life expectancy appear to indicate a significant increase in life expectancy among persons who previously smoked tobacco and switch to snus, depending on the age of the persons who switch, even when it is assumed that 100% of the risk of cardiovascular diseases among smokers transfers to snus users. This study determined that "for net harm to occur, 14–25 ex-smokers would have to start using snus to offset the health gain from every smoker who switched to snus." It is also noted, in the correspondence seen in the previous citation, that concerns about the effect of marketing by the tobacco industry, as influenced by the results of these scientific studies, is of primary concern to many researchers in the field, including the risk of emboldening the industry to attempt to increase snus sales among young people and promote dual-use of snus and smoked tobacco, and the use of medical nicotine, rather than snus, can better target at-risk populations, given better access and pricing.

=== Limitations of nicotine replacement therapy and the potential role of snus ===
However, a growing consensus among researchers of smoking cessation have found nicotine replacement therapy (NRT) products to have limited effectiveness because tobacco users may be seeking the combination of MAO inhibitors (which are found in tobacco) and nicotine, or that NRT products do not deliver sufficient quantities of nicotine. MAO inhibitors in tobacco act to amplify the rewarding effects of nicotine, but may also act as a form of self-medication for people with depression. This could explain the association between mental illness and smoking, but a confounding variable is that chronic nicotine administration itself has been shown to desensitize nicotine receptors over time and lead to antidepressant effects. Smoking cessation itself is strongly associated with reduced depression, anxiety, and stress and improved positive mood and quality of life compared with continuing to smoke. It has been hypothesized that snus' success when compared with conventional NRT as a cigarette substitute could be attributed to its MAO inhibiting properties. However, studies seem to suggest that for MAO inhibition, tobacco has to be pyrolysized (i.e., ignited as in cigarettes, cigars, and pipes). The competing theory is that the success of snus as a smoking alternative is due to its ability to deliver nicotine similar to that acquired through cigarettes, and twice as high as that acquired through NRT. Furthermore, the use of snus, similar to cigarettes, offers a choice of brand, aesthetic rituals of use, and tastes of tobacco and thus has sensory effects that NRT products perhaps lack.

=== Snus vs conventional NRT: success rates in smoking cessation ===
The use of daily snus for smoking cessation has had a 54% success rate for complete abstinence, and a 60% success rate for great reduction in cigarette consumption.

=== The debate over nitrosamine levels in snus ===
Opponents of snus sales maintain, nevertheless, that even the low nitrosamine levels in snus cannot be completely risk-free, but snus proponents point out that, inasmuch as snus is used as a substitute for smoking or a means to quit smoking, the net overall effect is positive, similar to the effect of nicotine patches.

=== Snus, second-hand smoke, and the harm reduction perspective ===
In addition, this eliminates any exposure to second-hand smoke, further reducing possible harm to other non-tobacco users. This is seen by public health advocates who believe in "harm reduction" as a reason for recommending snus and other NRTs, rather than continued use of methods of tobacco consumption that result in second-hand smoke.

This does not, however, eliminate any harm to health caused by the nicotine itself. Current research focuses on possible long-term side effects of nicotine on blood pressure, hypertension, and possible risk of pancreatic cancer due to tobacco-specific nitrosamines (TSNAs). TSNAs are the only component of tobacco shown to induce pancreatic cancer in laboratory animals. Nicotine may also exacerbate pancreatic illness, because nicotine stimulates the gastrointestinal tract's production of cholecystokinin, which stimulates pancreatic growth and may be implicated in pancreatic cancer. Thus far, the evidence specifically implicating snus in pancreatic cancer is only suggestive. Notably, the probability of developing pancreatic cancer from cigarettes is higher than the suggested chance of developing pancreatic cancer from snus.

The effect of Swedish snus on blood pressure has been studied at Umeå University in a randomly selected population sample of 4,305 Swedish men between the ages of 25 and 74. In the study, published in November 2008, the researchers found no elevation of blood pressure in snus users who had never been smokers compared to tobacco nonusers.
