= Disease Control Priorities Project =

Project to determine priorities for disease control across the world

The Disease Control Priorities Project (DCPP) is an ongoing project that aims to determine priorities for disease control across the world, particularly in low-income countries. The project is most well known for the second edition of the report Disease Control Priorities in Developing Countries (published in 2006, often abbreviated as DCP2 and sometimes referred to as "the DCP2 Report").

The Disease Control Priorities Project is a joint enterprise of a number of groups, including the University of Washington Department of Global Health, the World Bank, the Fogarty International Center (National Institutes of Health), World Health Organization, Population Reference Bureau, Gates Foundation, the Center for Disease Dynamics, Economics & Policy, and the International Decision Support Initiative. Notable editors involved in the project include Dean Jamison, Alan Lopez, Colin Mathers, Christopher J.L. Murray, George Alleyne, Ramanan Laxminarayan, Prabhat Jha, and Anne Mills.

== Publications ==
=== DCP1 ===
The first edition of Disease Control Priorities in Developing Countries, commonly referred to as DCP1, was published in 1993. DCP1 is cited in the 1993 World Development Report.

DCP1 is organized into five parts:

- Introduction
- The Unfinished Agenda, I · Infectious Disease
- The Unfinished Agenda, II · Reproductive Health and Malnutrition
- Emerging Problems
- Conclusion

Each part has chapters within it; there are 29 chapters in all. The report spans more than 700 pages and has as contributors 79 authors in addition to the four editors.

=== DCP2 ===
The second edition of Disease Control Priorities in Developing Countries, commonly referred to as DCP2 and sometimes referred to as "the DCP2 Report", was published in 2006. DCP2 is organized into 73 chapters, and is a 1400-page report by more than 350 specialists around the world with the goal of providing policy recommendations to reduce global disease burdens. The report is in English, but translations for some of the chapters to Arabic, Chinese, French, and Spanish are available. The report has been released under the Creative Commons attribution license (CC-BY) and a copy of DCP2 can be downloaded from the World Bank's Open Knowledge Repository. The full text of the report can also be read online on the National Center for Biotechnology Information (National Institutes of Health) website.

In comparison to DCP1, DCP2 is more systematic in its coverage.

=== DCP3 ===
For third edition, the name of the report was shortened to Disease Control Priorities. The third edition is commonly referred to as DCP3, and was published in nine volumes over the time period 2015–2018.

The nine volumes are as follows:

1. Essential Surgery
2. Reproductive, Maternal, Newborn, and Child Health
3. Cancer
4. Mental, Neurological, and Substance Use Disorders
5. Cardiovascular, Respiratory and Related Disorders
6. Major Infectious Diseases
7. Injury Prevention and Environmental Health
8. Child & Adolescent Development
9. Disease Control Priorities (summary volume)

DCP3 also has several companion publications:

- Economic Dimensions of Noncommunicable Diseases in Latin America and the Caribbean
- Optimizing Education Outcomes: High-Return Investments in School Health for Increased Participation and Learning
- Re-Imagining School Feeding: A High Return Investment in Human Capital and Local Economies

=== Other publications ===
In addition to DCP1, DCP2, and DCP3, the DCPP has produced other background papers and major publications. These include the following:

- Global Burden of Disease and Risk Factors (Lopez and others 2006) with the World Health Organization
- Millions Saved: Proven Successes in Global Health (Levine and the What Works Working Group 2004) with the Center for Global Development
- "The Intolerable Burden of Malaria: II. What's New, What's Needed" (Breman, Alilio, and Mills 2004) with the Multilateral Initiative on Malaria
- Priorities in Health (Jamison and others 2006), a nontechnical companion to DCP2

== Reception ==
GiveWell found five errors in DCP2's cost-effectiveness estimate of soil-transmitted-helminth treatment, and found that correcting for these led to a cost-effectiveness estimate of $326.43 per DALY rather than the $3.41 per DALY figure given in DCP2. GiveWell also discovered that the schistosomiasis treatment cost-effectiveness figure had a critical typo, publishing $3.36–$6.92 per DALY, when it should be $336–$692 per DALY, although the number was correct on another page.

== See also ==
- Copenhagen Consensus
- Voices of the Poor
- Moving Out of Poverty
