= Cécile Viboud =

French epidemiologist

- Education: Pierre and Marie Curie University; University of Lyon
- Scientific career
- Workplaces: National Institutes of Health
- Thesis: Prédictions épidémiologiques de la grippe en zones tempérées (2003)

Cécile Viboud is a staff scientist based in the Fogarty International Center at the National Institutes of Health, where she is part of the Multinational Influenza Seasonal Mortality Study (MISMS). Viboud specialises in the mortality of infectious disease. Viboud was involved with epidemiological analysis during the COVID-19 pandemic.

== Early life and education ==
Viboud is from France. She earned her undergraduate degree in biomedical engineering at the University of Lyon. She moved to Pierre and Marie Curie University (UPMC) for her graduate studies, where she specialised in public health. Viboud completed her doctoral degree at UPMC, where she worked under the supervision of Antoine Flahault. She studied the spread of influenza epidemics through the use of a method of analogues. The method of analogues is a model borrowed from meteorology, using vectors from historical influenza epidemics that matches current activity.

== Research and career ==
Viboud is a staff scientist of the Fogarty International Center at the National Institutes of Health. She is part of the Multinational Influenza Seasonal Mortality Study (MISMS). Here she studies the mortality burden and transmission dynamics of infectious diseases.

She has extensively investigated the epidemiology of influenza. In 2016, Viboud discussed the effect of a person's first case of influenza on their later likelihood to become infected. For example, if people were exposed to a particular strain of influenza as a child, they would be to 75% less likely to contract it in the future. Viboud has also studied how urbanisation impacts the intensity of influenza epidemics. She showed that more diffuse epidemics occur in large cities, which were less sensitive to changes in climate. In these cities people live so close together that the virus can spread easily from person to person. In an effort to better predict influenza-like illness activity, Viboud has examined whether they can be forecast using heart rate information from activity trackers.

During the COVID-19 pandemic, Viboud was part of international efforts to collect, curate and disseminate epidemiological information about SARS-CoV-2. As part of this effort, she monitored the time between onset of symptoms and visiting a medical facility. She found that people in the Hubei province who experienced SARS-CoV-2 symptoms waited longer before seeking help than in other parts of China, or even those overseas. The delay between symptom onset and visiting a clinic was found to decrease throughout January, which Viboud associated with and increase in news reports and content sharing on social media. She believed that a crowd-sourced, collaborative, physician-oriented social network helped to compile early SARS-CoV-2 data, as well as helping to track the progression of the outbreak. These efforts helped to disseminate up-to-date and correct information when limited data was available. She has also investigated why there are so few cases of COVID-19 in younger populations.

Throughout February and March 2020 Viboud continued to monitor the evolving epidemic, looking to describe the epidemiology and transmission dynamics of SARS-CoV-2 as it spread beyond Hubei province. Her findings identified that infectiousness peaked early in the disease and that transmission may occur before symptoms even manifest. She believes that as the pandemic progressed around the world, social distancing reduced the time for community transmission.

Viboud evaluated the impact of travel restrictions on the spread of SARS-CoV-2, starting from the travel restrictions out of Wuhan from January 23. She identified that the Wuhan travel ban only delayed the spread to mainland China by 5 days, but prevented international spread until the middle of February. In April 2020, Viboud commented that the number of Americans who had lost their lives to SARS-CoV-2 was likely to be considerably higher than was officially reported. Throughout the COVID-19 pandemic, Viboud was involved with regular conference calls with Centers for Disease Control and Prevention to provide expert advice on the ongoing pandemic. She has documented her work on COVID-19 with the Center for Disease Dynamics, Economics & Policy.

== Selected publications ==
- Goodwin, K; Viboud, C; Simonsen, L (2006-02-20). "Antibody response to influenza vaccination in the elderly: A quantitative review". Vaccine. 24 (8): 1159–1169. doi:10.1016/j.vaccine.2005.08.105. ISSN 0264-410X. PMID 16213065.
- Mockenhaupt, Maja; Viboud, Cécile; Dunant, Ariane; Naldi, Luigi; Halevy, Sima; Bavinck, Jan Nico Bouwes; Sidoroff, Alexis; Schneck, Jürgen; Roujeau, Jean-Claude; Flahault, Antoine (January 2008). "Stevens–Johnson Syndrome and Toxic Epidermal Necrolysis: Assessment of Medication Risks with Emphasis on Recently Marketed Drugs. The EuroSCAR-Study". Journal of Investigative Dermatology. 128 (1): 35–44. doi:10.1038/sj.jid.5701033. ISSN 0022-202X. PMID 17805350.
- Viboud, Cécile; Bjørnstad, Ottar N.; Smith, David L. (2006-04-21). "Synchrony, Waves, and Spatial Hierarchies in the Spread of Influenza". Science. 312 (5772): 447–451. Bibcode:2006Sci...312..447V. doi:10.1126/science.1125237. PMID 16574822.
