= Department of Global Health (University of Washington) =

Academic department

The Department of Global Health is an academic department within the School of Public Health at the University of Washington in Seattle, Washington.

The department was begun with funding supplied by the Bill & Melinda Gates Foundation.

== 2005–2006 selection of the chair ==
Jim Yong Kim, formerly of Partners in Health and the WHO HIV/AIDS program, was originally a candidate for director of the department, but was not selected. A controversial second selection process involving three new candidates took place in late 2005 and early 2006. The process was criticized for not being open, and there was concern among the student body and faculty about the chosen chair. Some feared that the department would be too heavily oriented towards biomedical research and biotechnology (e.g. vaccine development) and would neglect the broader issues of public health, such as social justice, health disparities, prevention, promotion, human resources in health, and public policy. Some also feared that the areas of education and service would be sacrificed for a research agenda, and pointed to the fact that one of the first steps in implementing the department was the leasing of a large facility off campus in Seattle's South Lake Union neighborhood - an area being developed as a biotechnology hub.

On September 8, 2006, the University of Washington announced King K. Holmes, MD, PhD, a world leader in AIDS and infectious disease research and training, to become the first chair of the University of Washington's new Department of Global Health.

== See also ==
- Dean Jamison
- Disease Control Priorities Project
