= Health effects of smoking tobacco =

Circumstances, mechanisms, and factors of tobacco consumption on human health

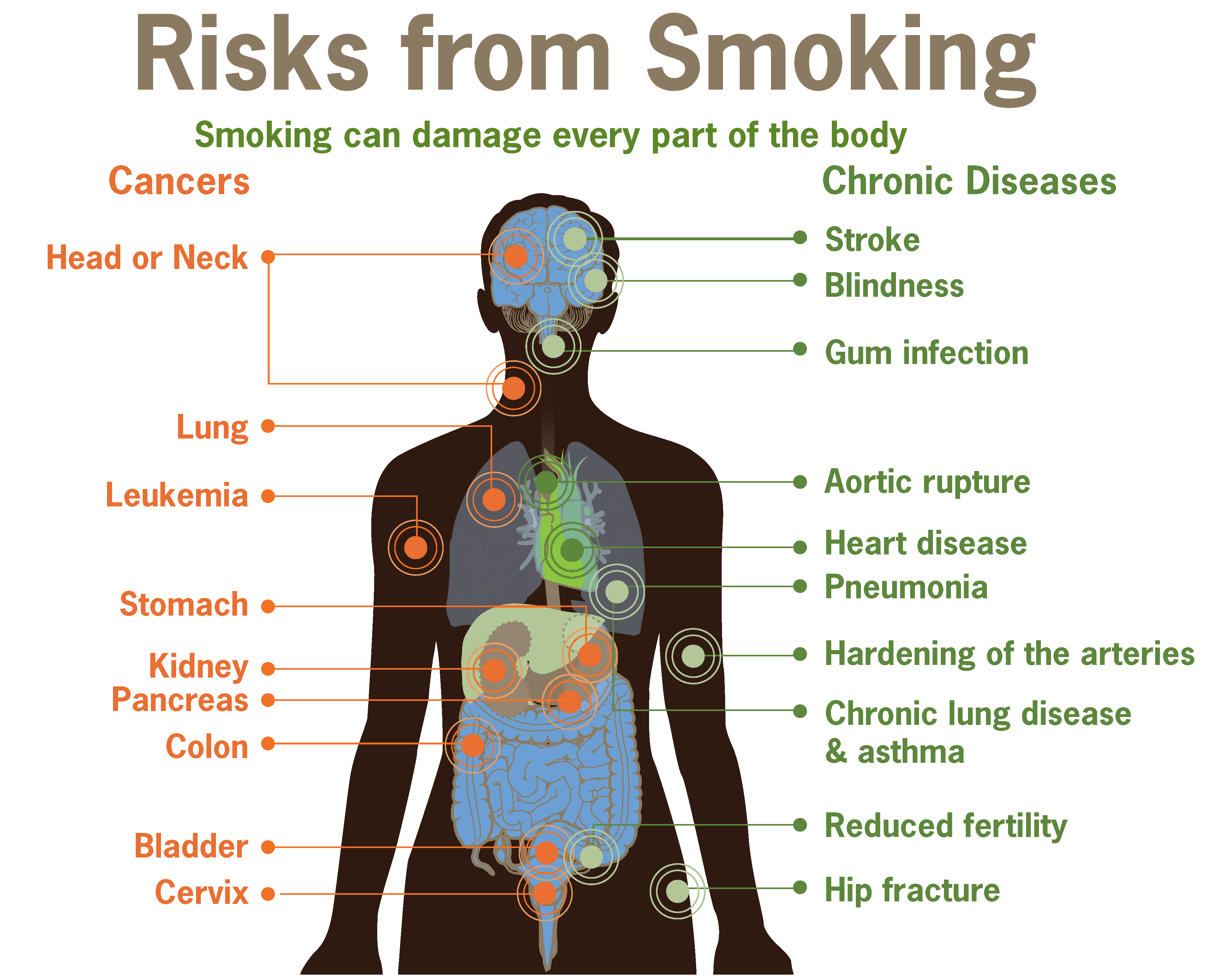
A diagram of the human body showing cancers and chronic diseases caused by smoking

Substances risk factor vs direct deaths

Smoking tobacco has serious negative effects on human health. Tobacco smoking is the greatest cause of preventable death globally. Half of tobacco smokers die from complications related to smoking. Active smokers are estimated to die an average of 10 years earlier than non-smokers. The World Health Organization estimates that, annually, more than 7 million people die from tobacco-related causes, including 1.6 million non-smokers due to passive smoking. It is further estimated to have caused 100 million deaths in the 20th century.

Tobacco smoke contains over 70 chemicals, known as carcinogens, that cause cancer. It also contains nicotine, a highly addictive psychoactive drug. When tobacco is smoked, the nicotine causes physical and psychological dependency. Cigarettes sold in least developed countries have higher tar content and are less likely to be filtered, increasing vulnerability to tobacco smoking–related diseases in these regions.

Tobacco use most commonly leads to diseases affecting the heart, liver, and lungs. Smoking is a major risk factor for several conditions, namely pneumonia, heart attacks, strokes, chronic obstructive pulmonary disease (COPD)—including emphysema and chronic bronchitis—and multiple cancers (particularly lung cancer, cancers of the larynx and mouth, bladder cancer, and pancreatic cancer). It is also responsible for peripheral arterial disease and high blood pressure. The effects vary depending on how frequently and for how many years a person smokes. Smoking earlier in life and smoking cigarettes with higher tar content increases the risk of these diseases. Additionally, other forms of environmental tobacco smoke exposure, known as passive smoke and third-hand smoke, have manifested harmful health effects in people of all ages. Tobacco use is also a significant risk factor in miscarriages among pregnant women who smoke. It contributes to several other health problems for the fetus, such as premature birth and low birth weight, and increases the chance of sudden infant death syndrome (SIDS) by 1.4 to 3 times. The incidence of erectile dysfunction is approximately 85 percent higher in men who smoke compared to men who do not smoke.

Many countries have taken measures to control tobacco consumption by restricting its usage and sales. They have printed warning messages on packaging. Moreover, smoking bans in public places like workplaces, theaters, bars, and restaurants have been enacted to reduce exposure to passive smoke. Tobacco taxation inflating the price of tobacco products, have also been imposed.

In the late 1700s and the 1800s, the idea that tobacco use caused certain diseases, including mouth cancers, was initially accepted by the medical community. In the 1880s, automation dramatically reduced the cost of cigarettes, cigarette companies greatly increased their marketing, and use expanded. From the 1890s onwards, associations of tobacco use with cancers and vascular disease were regularly reported. By the 1930s, multiple researchers concluded that tobacco use caused cancer and that tobacco users lived substantially shorter lives. Further studies were published in Germany in 1939 and 1943, and one in the Netherlands in 1948. However, widespread attention was first drawn in 1950 by researchers from the United States and the United Kingdom, but their research was widely criticized. Follow-up studies in the early 1950s found that people who smoked died faster and were more likely to die of lung cancer and cardiovascular disease. These results were accepted in the medical community and publicized among the general public in the mid-1960s.

== Overview ==
Addiction experts in psychiatry, chemistry, pharmacology, forensic science, epidemiology, and the police engaged in a Delphi method regarding 20 popular recreational drugs. Tobacco was ranked 3rd in dependence, 14th in physical harm, and 12th in social harm.

Smoking most commonly leads to diseases affecting the heart and lungs and will commonly affect areas such as hands or feet. First signs of smoking-related health issues often show up as numbness in the extremities, with smoking being a major risk factor for heart attacks, chronic obstructive pulmonary disease (COPD), emphysema, and cancer, particularly lung cancer, cancers of the larynx and mouth, and pancreatic cancer. The immune system is also weakened by smoking, which makes the body more susceptible to infections and takes longer to recover from injuries. Overall life expectancy is also reduced in long term smokers, with estimates ranging from 10 to 17.9 years fewer than non-smokers. About half of men who smoke long-term will die of illness due to smoking.

The association of smoking with lung cancer and COPD is among the strongest, both in the public perception and etiologically. Among male smokers, the lifetime risk of developing lung cancer is 17%; among female smokers, the risk is 12%. This risk is significantly lower in non-smokers: 1.3% in men and 1.4% in women. For COPD, the 25-year incidence of moderate and severe COPD is at least 21% for continuous smokers and 4% for non-smokers, with no difference being reported between men and women.

A person's increased risk of contracting disease is related to the length of time that a person continues to smoke and the amount smoked. However, even smoking one cigarette a day raises the risk of coronary heart disease by about 50% or more, and for stroke by about 30%. Smoking 20 cigarettes a day entails a higher risk, but not proportionately.

If someone stops smoking, then these chances gradually decrease as the damage to their body is repaired. A year after quitting, the risk of contracting heart disease is half that of a continuing smoker. The health risks of smoking are not uniform across all smokers; risks vary according to the amount of tobacco smoked, with those who smoke more at greater risk. Smoking so-called "light" cigarettes does not reduce the risk.

== Mortality ==
Death rate from smoking

Share deaths smoking

Smoking is the cause of more than 7 million deaths per year, making it the most common cause of preventable early death. One study found that male and female smokers lose an average of 13 and 15 years of life, respectively, while another measured a loss of life of 7 years. Each cigarette is estimated to shorten life by an average of 11 minutes, though this may vary slightly depending on the contents and brand. More recently, it has been reported to be 20 minutes. At least half of all lifelong smokers die early as a result of smoking. Smokers are three times more likely to die before the age of 70 than non-smokers.

In the United States, cigarette smoking and exposure to tobacco smoke account for roughly one in five, or at least 443,000 premature deaths annually. To put this into context, ABC's Peter Jennings (who would later die at 67 from lung cancer caused by life-long smoking) famously reported that in the US alone, smoking tobacco kills the equivalent of three jumbo jets full of people crashing every day, with no survivors. On a worldwide basis, this equates to a single jumbo jet every hour.

A 2015 study found that about 17% of mortality due to cigarette smoking in the United States is due to diseases outside of those commonly linked with smoking. Official estimates may therefore be significantly underestimating the number of deaths currently being attributed to smoking.

It is estimated that there are between 1 and 1.4 deaths per million cigarettes smoked. Cigarette factories are the most deadly factories in the history of the world.

== Cancer ==
Effects of smoking include both immediate and long-term lung damage.

The primary risks of tobacco usage include many forms of cancer, particularly lung cancer, kidney cancer, cancer of the larynx and head and neck, bladder cancer, esophageal cancer, pancreatic cancer, stomach cancer, and penile cancer. Tobacco smoke can increase the risk of cervical cancer in women. There may be a small increased risk of myeloid leukemia, squamous cell sinonasal cancer, liver cancer, colorectal cancer, cancers of the gallbladder, the adrenal gland, the small intestine, and various childhood cancers. The possible connection between breast cancer and tobacco is still uncertain.

=== Mouth ===
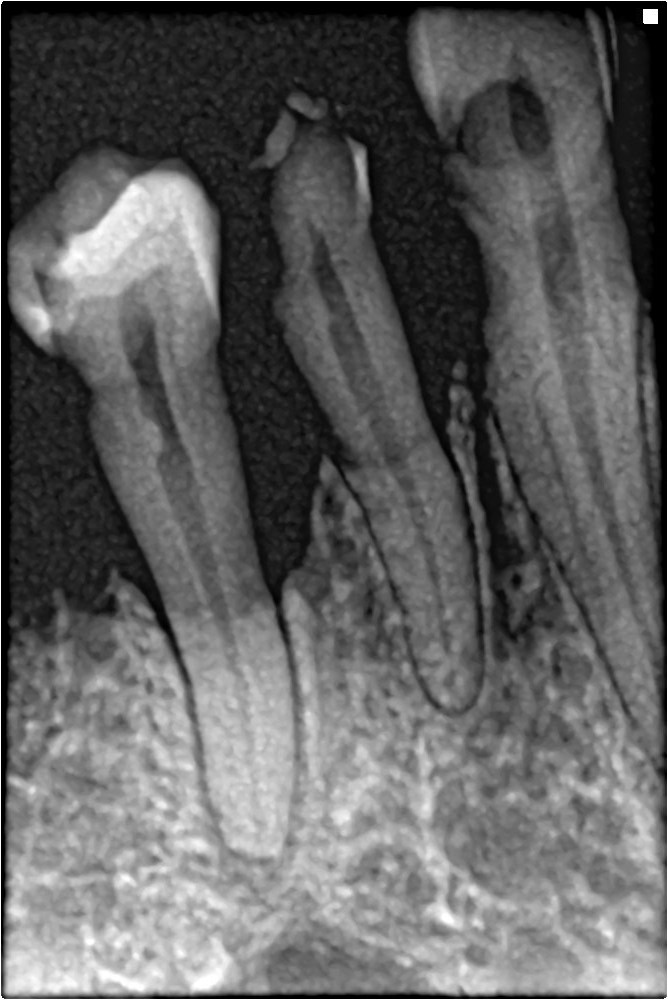
Dental radiograph showing bone loss in a 32-year-old heavy smoker

Perhaps the most serious oral condition caused by smoking (including pipe smoking) is oral cancer. However, smoking also increases the risk for various other oral diseases, some almost completely exclusive to tobacco users. Roughly half of periodontitis or inflammation around the teeth cases are attributed to current or former smoking. Smokeless tobacco causes gingival recession and white mucosal lesions. Up to 90% of periodontitis patients who are not helped by common modes of treatment are smokers. Smokers have significantly greater loss of bone height than non-smokers, and the trend can be extended to pipe smokers to have more bone loss than non-smokers.

Smoking traditional cigarettes, e-cigarettes, and heat-not-burn products also affects the salivary cytokine levels needed in immune responses. Traditional cigarettes slightly intensify the immune response in long-term smokers compared to non-smokers, with long-term smokers showing higher levels of IFN-γ than non-smokers. E-cigarettes and heat-not-burn products, while marketed as a healthier alternative, have been shown to inhibit immune response function. Users of these products show lower levels of salivary cytokines, chemokines, and growth factors that function to keep the immune response strong and active in the mouth.

Smoking has been proven to be an important factor in teeth staining. Halitosis or bad breath is common among tobacco smokers. Tooth loss is 2 to 3 times higher in smokers than in non-smokers. In addition, complications may further include leukoplakia, the adherent white plaques or patches on the mucous membranes of the oral cavity, including the tongue.

=== Head and neck cancer ===
George Harrison smoking a cigarette in Amsterdam in 1964. Harrison publicly blamed decades of heavy cigarette smoking for his throat cancer, which later developed in his lungs, and fatally metastasized to his brain.

Tobacco smoking is the main risk factor for head and neck cancer. Cigarette smokers have a lifetime increased risk for head and neck cancer that is 5 to 25 times higher than the general population. The person who used to smoke's risk of developing head and neck cancer begins to approach the risk in the general population 15 years after smoking cessation. In addition, people who smoke have a worse prognosis than those who have never smoked. Furthermore, people who continue to smoke after a diagnosis of head and neck cancer have the highest probability of dying compared to those who have never smoked. This effect is seen in patients with HPV-positive head and neck cancer as well. Passive smoking, both at work and at home, also increases the risk of head and neck cancer.

Using tobacco together with alcohol is an especially strong risk factor for head and neck cancer, causing 72% of all cases. This rises to 89% when looking specifically at laryngeal cancer. Smokeless tobacco (including products where tobacco is chewed) is also a cause of oral cancer. Cigar and pipe smoking are also important risk factors for oral cancer and have a dose-dependent relationship, with more consumption leading to higher chances of developing cancer. The use of electronic cigarettes may also lead to the development of head and neck cancers due to the substances like propylene glycol, glycerol, nitrosamines, and metals contained therein, which can damage the airways.

=== Lung cancer ===
Relationship between cigarette consumption per person (blue) and male lung cancer rates (dark yellow) in the US

The risk of lung cancer is highly influenced by smoking, with up to 90% of diagnoses being attributed to tobacco smoking. The risk of developing lung cancer increases with the number of years smoked and the number of cigarettes smoked per day. Smoking can be linked to all subtypes of lung cancer. Small-cell carcinoma (SCLC) is the most closely associated with almost 100% of cases occurring in smokers. This form of cancer has been identified with autocrine growth loops, proto-oncogene activation, and inhibition of tumor suppressor genes. SCLC may originate from neuroendocrine cells located in the bronchus called Feyrter cells.

The risk of dying from lung cancer before age 85 is 22% for a male smoker and 12% for a female smoker, in the absence of competing causes of death. The corresponding estimates for lifelong non-smokers are a 1.1% probability of dying from lung cancer before age 85 for a man of European descent and a 0.8% probability for a woman.

American epidemiologist and biologist E. Cuyler Hammond (1912–1986) was one of the first researchers to establish a link between smoking and lung cancer.

== Pulmonary effects ==
In smoking, long-term exposure to compounds found in the smoke (e.g., carbon monoxide and cyanide) are believed to be responsible for pulmonary damage and for loss of elasticity in the alveoli, leading to emphysema and chronic obstructive pulmonary disease (COPD). COPD caused by smoking is a permanent, incurable, and often terminal reduction of pulmonary capacity characterized by shortness of breath, wheezing, persistent cough with sputum, and damage to the lungs, including emphysema and chronic bronchitis. The carcinogen acrolein and its derivatives also contribute to the chronic inflammation present in COPD.

== Cardiovascular disease ==
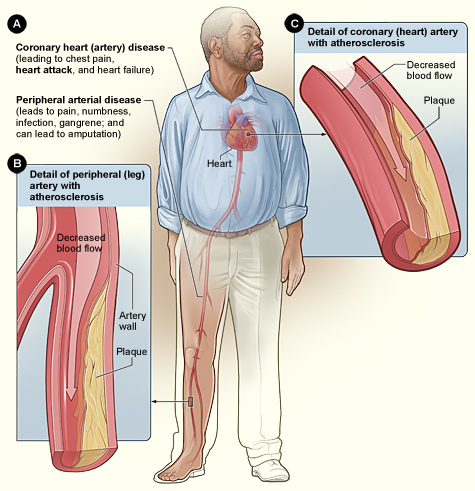
Smoking can cause atherosclerosis, leading to coronary artery disease and peripheral arterial disease.

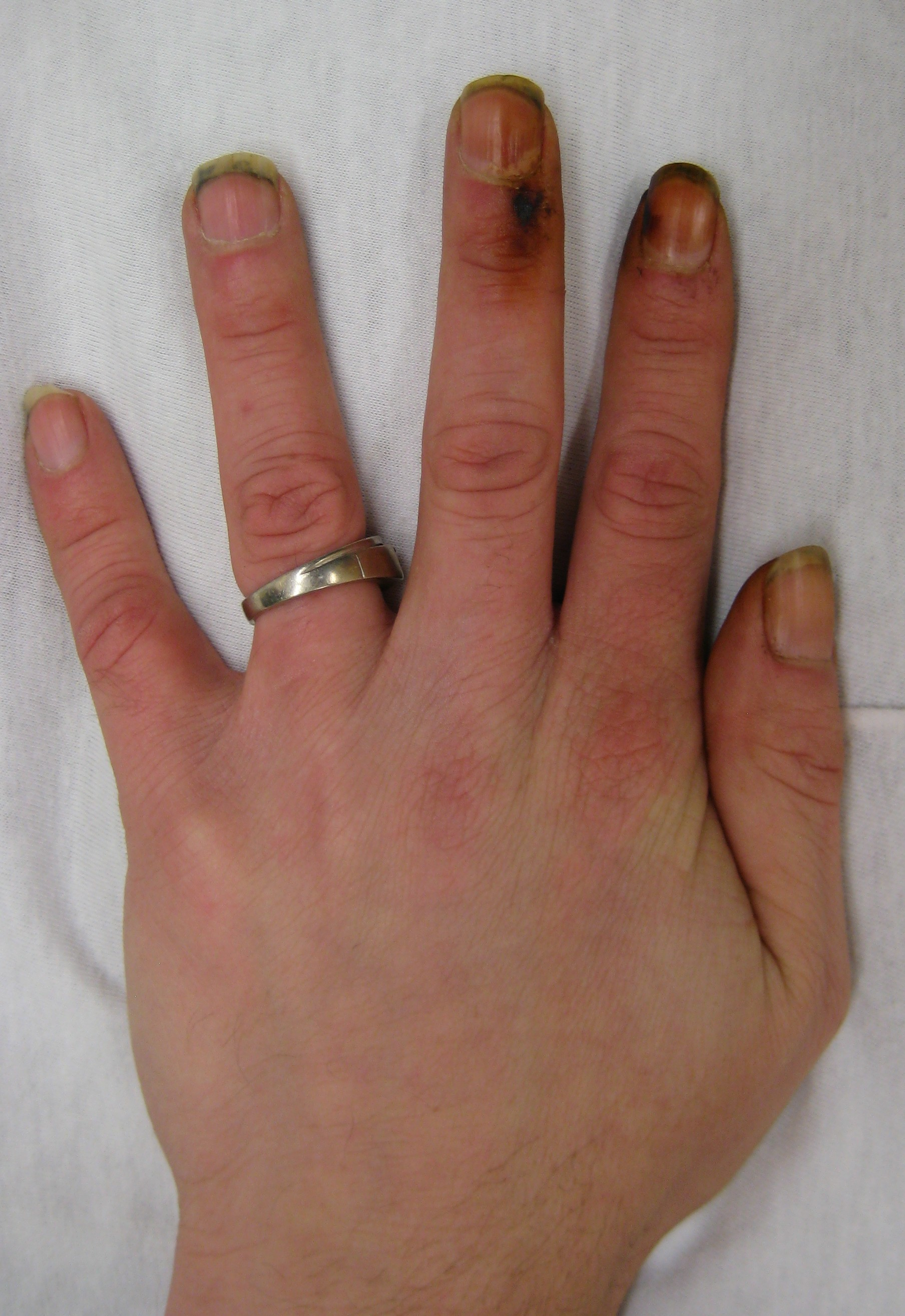
Tobacco stains on the fingers of a heavy smoker

Inhalation of tobacco smoke causes several immediate responses within the heart and blood vessels. Within one minute, the heart rate begins to rise, increasing by as much as 30 percent during the first 10 minutes of smoking. Carbon monoxide in tobacco smoke exerts negative effects by reducing the blood's oxygen-carrying ability.

Smoking also increases the chance of heart disease, stroke, atherosclerosis, and peripheral artery disease. Several ingredients of tobacco lead to the narrowing of blood vessels, increasing the likelihood of a blockage, and thus a heart attack or stroke. According to a study by an international team of researchers, people under 40 are five times more likely to have a heart attack if they are smokers.

Exposure to tobacco smoke is known to increase oxidative stress in the body by various mechanisms, including depletion of plasma antioxidants such as vitamin C.

Research by American biologists has shown that cigarette smoke also influences the process of cell division in the cardiac muscle and changes the heart's shape.

Smoking tobacco has also been linked to Buerger's disease (thromboangiitis obliterans), the acute inflammation and thrombosis (clotting) of arteries and veins of the hands and feet.

Although cigarette smoking causes a greater increase in the risk of cancer than cigar smoking, people who smoke cigars still have an increased risk for many health problems, including cancer, when compared to people who do not smoke. As for second-hand smoke, the NIH study points to the large amount of smoke generated by one cigar, saying "cigars can contribute substantial amounts of tobacco smoke to the indoor environment; and, when large numbers of cigar smokers congregate in a cigar smoking event, the amount of passive smoke produced is sufficient to be a health concern for those regularly required to work in those environments".

Smoking also tends to increase blood cholesterol levels. Furthermore, the ratio of high-density lipoprotein (HDL, commonly referred to as "good" cholesterol) to low-density lipoprotein (LDL, "bad" cholesterol) tends to be lower in smokers compared to non-smokers. Smoking also raises the levels of fibrinogen and increases platelet production (both involved in blood clotting), which makes the blood thicker and more likely to clot. Carbon monoxide binds to hemoglobin (the component carrying the oxygen in red blood cells), resulting in a much more stable complex than hemoglobin bound with oxygen or carbon dioxide and therefore permanent loss of blood cell functionality. Blood cells are naturally recycled after a certain period, allowing for the creation of new, functional red blood cells. However, if carbon monoxide exposure reaches a certain point before it can be recycled, hypoxia (and later death) occurs.

All these factors make smokers more at risk of developing various forms of arteriosclerosis (hardening of the arteries). As the arteriosclerosis progresses, blood flows less easily through rigid and narrowed blood vessels, making the blood more likely to form a thrombosis (clot). Sudden blockage of a blood vessel may lead to an infarction (stroke or heart attack). However, the effects of smoking on the heart may be more subtle. These conditions may develop gradually, given the smoking–healing cycle (the human body heals itself between periods of smoking). Therefore, a person who smokes may develop less significant disorders, such as worsening or maintenance of unpleasant dermatological conditions, e.g., eczema, due to reduced blood supply. Smoking also increases blood pressure and weakens blood vessels.

== Renal ==
In addition to increasing the risk of kidney cancer, smoking can also contribute to additional kidney damage. Smokers are at a significantly increased risk for chronic kidney disease than non-smokers. A history of smoking encourages the progression of diabetic nephropathy.

== Infections ==
Smoking is also linked to susceptibility to infectious diseases, particularly in the lungs (pneumonia). Smoking more than 20 cigarettes a day increases the risk of tuberculosis by two to four times and being a current smoker has been linked to a fourfold increase in the risk of invasive disease caused by the pathogenic bacteria Streptococcus pneumoniae. It is believed that smoking increases the risk of these and other pulmonary and respiratory tract infections both through structural damage and through effects on the immune system. The effects on the immune system include an increase in CD4+ cell production attributable to nicotine, which has tentatively been linked to increased HIV susceptibility.

Smoking increases the risk of Kaposi's sarcoma in people without HIV infection. One study found this only with the male population and could not draw any conclusions for the female participants in the study.

=== Influenza ===
A study of an outbreak of an (H1N1) influenza in an Israeli military unit of 336 healthy young men to determine the relation of cigarette smoking to the incidence of clinically apparent influenza, revealed that, of 168 smokers, 69% had influenza, as compared with 47% of non-smokers. Influenza was also more severe in the smokers; 51% of them lost work days or required bed rest, or both, as compared with 30% of the non-smokers.

According to a study of 1,900 male cadets after the 1968 Hong Kong A2 influenza epidemic at a South Carolina military academy, compared with people who did not smoke, people who smoked heavily (more than 20 cigarettes per day) had 21% more illnesses and 20% more bed rest, people who smoked lightly (20 cigarettes or fewer per day) had 10% more illnesses and 7% more bed rest.

The effect of cigarette smoking on epidemic influenza was studied prospectively among 1,811 male college students. Clinical influenza incidence among those who smoked 21 or more cigarettes daily was 21% higher than that of people who did not smoke. Influenza incidence among people who smoked 1 to 20 cigarettes daily was intermediate between those who did not smoke and people who smoked heavily.

Surveillance of a 1979 influenza outbreak at a military base for women in Israel revealed that influenza symptoms developed in 60% of the current smokers vs. 42% of the non-smokers.

Smoking seems to cause a higher relative influenza risk in older populations than in younger populations. In a prospective study of community-dwelling people 60–90 years of age, in 1993, of unimmunized people, 23% of people who smoked had clinical influenza compared with 6% of people who did not smoke.

Smoking may substantially contribute to the growth of influenza epidemics affecting the entire population.

== Fertility ==
=== Erectile dysfunction ===
Smoking is a key cause of erectile dysfunction (ED). The incidence of erectile dysfunction (difficulty achieving and maintaining a penile erection) is approximately 85 percent higher in men who smoke compared to men who do not smoke. Smoking causes impotence because it promotes arterial narrowing and damages cells lining the inside of the arteries, thus leading to reduce penile blood flow.

=== Female infertility ===
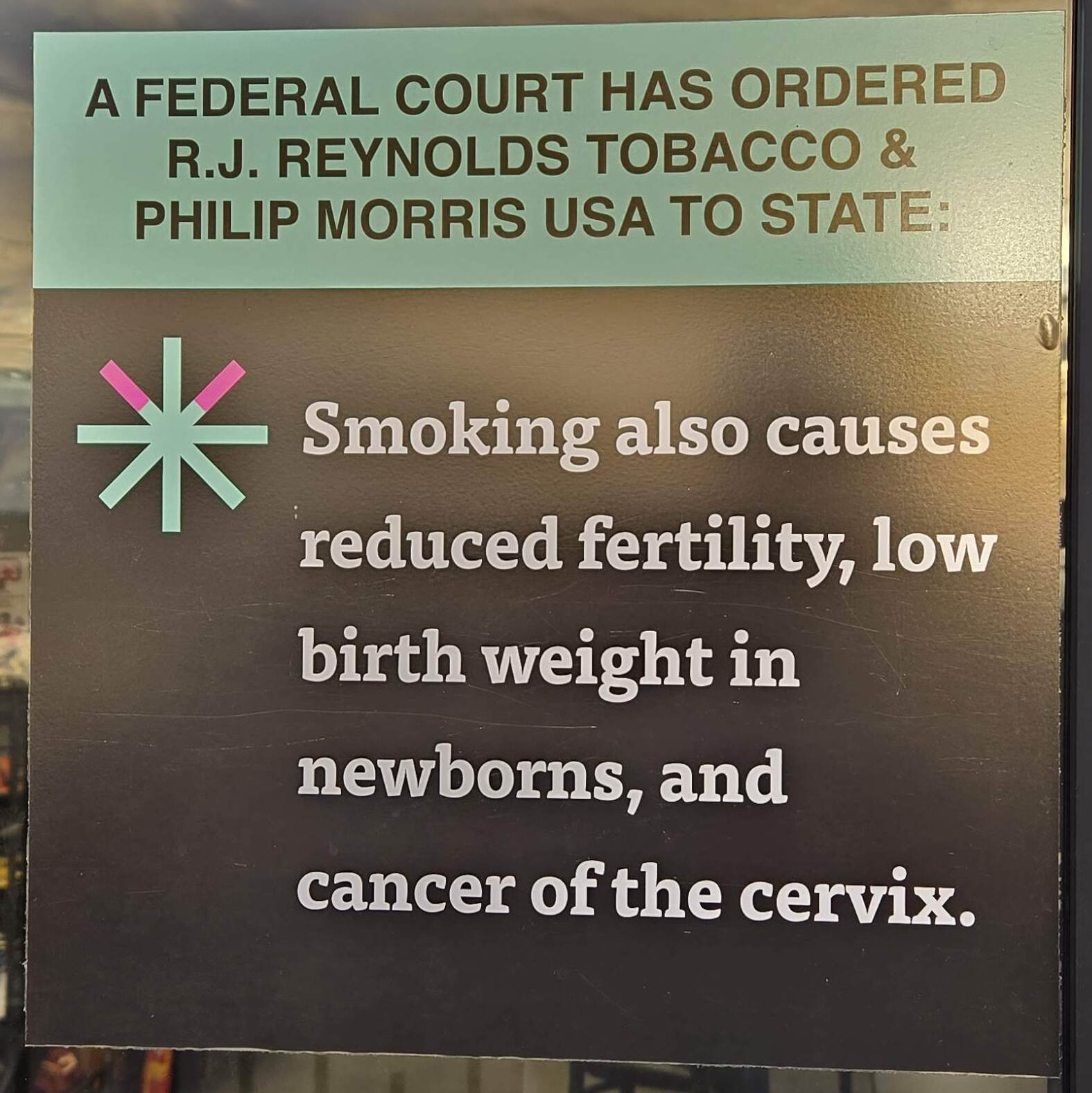
A court-ordered corrective statement: "Smoking also causes reduced fertility, low birth weight in newborns, and cancer of the cervix", resulting from the case United States v. Philip Morris

Smoking is harmful to the ovaries, potentially causing female infertility. The degree of damage is dependent upon the amount and length of time a woman smokes. Nicotine and other harmful chemicals in cigarettes interfere with the body's ability to create estrogen, a hormone that regulates folliculogenesis and ovulation. Also, cigarette smoking interferes with folliculogenesis, embryo transport, endometrial receptivity, endometrial angiogenesis, uterine blood flow, and the uterine myometrium. Some damage is irreversible, but stopping smoking can prevent further damage. Smokers are 60% more likely to be infertile than non-smokers. Smoking reduces the chances of in vitro fertilization (IVF) producing a live birth by 34% and increases the risk of an IVF pregnancy miscarrying by 30%.

=== Effects on pregnancy ===
A number of studies have shown that tobacco use is a significant factor in miscarriages among pregnant smokers, and that it contributes to a number of other threats to the health of the fetus such as low birth weight and pre-term birth. It slightly increases the risk of neural tube defects.

Environmental tobacco smoke exposure and maternal smoking during pregnancy have been shown to cause lower infant birth weights.

== Multigenerational effects ==
Cigarette smoking has been found to affect global epigenetic regulation of transcription across tissue types. Studies have shown differences in epigenetic markers such as DNA methylation, histone modifications, and miRNA expression between smokers and non-smokers. Similar differences exist in children whose mothers smoked during pregnancy. These epigenetic effects are thought to be linked to many of negative health effects associated with smoking.

Studies have shown an association between prenatal exposure to environmental tobacco smoke and conduct disorder in children. As well, postnatal tobacco smoke exposure may cause similar behavioral problems in children.

== Psychological effects ==
American Psychologist stated, "Smokers often report that cigarettes help relieve feelings of stress. However, the stress levels of adult smokers are slightly higher than those of non-smokers, adolescent smokers report increasing levels of stress as they develop regular patterns of smoking, and smoking cessation leads to reduced stress. Far from acting as an aid for mood control, nicotine dependency seems to exacerbate stress. This is confirmed in the daily mood patterns described by smokers, with normal moods during smoking and worsening moods between cigarettes. Thus, the apparent relaxant effect of smoking only reflects the reversal of the tension and irritability that develop during nicotine depletion. Dependent smokers need nicotine to remain feeling normal."

=== Immediate effects ===
Users report feelings of relaxation, sharpness, calmness, and alertness. Those new to smoking may experience nausea, dizziness, coughing and a bad taste in the mouth, and a number of adverse cardio-vascular effects such as increased blood pressure, narrowed arteries, rapid heart beat.

Generally, the unpleasant symptoms will eventually vanish over time, with repeated use, as the body builds a tolerance to the chemicals in the cigarettes, such as nicotine. While the functional changes are mostly reversible after quitting, the structural cardiovascular damage is not fully reversible.

=== Social and behavioral effects ===
Most smokers, when denied access to nicotine, exhibit withdrawal symptoms such as irritability, jitteriness, dry mouth, and rapid heart beat. The onset of these symptoms is very fast, nicotine's half-life being only two hours. The psychological dependence may linger for months or even many years. Nicotine withdrawal has been shown to cause clinically significant distress.

Medical researchers have found that smoking is a predictor of divorce. Smokers have a 53% greater chance of divorce than non-smokers.

=== Cognitive function ===
In many respects, nicotine acts on the nervous system in a similar way to caffeine. Some writings have stated that smoking can also increase mental concentration; one study documents a significantly better performance on the Advanced Raven Progressive Matrices test after smoking.

However, long-term usage of tobacco can create cognitive dysfunction. There seems to be an increased risk of Alzheimer's disease (AD), although "case–control and cohort studies produce conflicting results as to the direction of the association between smoking and AD". Smoking has been found to contribute to dementia and cognitive decline, reduced memory and cognitive abilities in adolescents, and brain shrinkage (cerebral atrophy).

=== Alzheimer's disease ===
Some studies have found that patients with Alzheimer's disease are more likely not to have smoked than the general population, which has been interpreted to suggest that smoking offers some protection against Alzheimer's. However, the research in this area is limited and the results are conflicting; some studies show that smoking increases the risk of Alzheimer's disease. A recent review of the available scientific literature concluded that the apparent decrease in Alzheimer's risk may be simply because smokers tend to die before reaching the age at which Alzheimer's normally occurs. "Differential mortality is always likely to be a problem where there is a need to investigate the effects of smoking in a disorder with very low incidence rates before age 75 years, which is the case of Alzheimer's disease," it stated, noting that smokers are only half as likely as non-smokers to survive to the age of 80.

Some older analyses have claimed that non-smokers are up to twice as likely as smokers to develop Alzheimer's disease. More recent analysis has found that most of the studies which showed a preventing effect were closely affiliated with the tobacco industry. Researchers without tobacco lobby influence have concluded the complete opposite: Smokers are almost twice as likely as non-smokers to develop Alzheimer's disease.

=== Parkinson's disease ===
In the case of Parkinson's disease, a series of observational studies that consistently suggest a possibly substantial reduction in risk among smokers (and other consumers of tobacco products) has led to longstanding interest among epidemiologists.

Non-biological factors that may contribute to such observations include reverse causality (whereby prodromal symptoms of Parkinson's disease may lead some smokers to quit before diagnosis), and personality considerations (people predisposed to Parkinson's disease tend to be relatively risk-averse, and may be less likely to have a history of smoking). Possible existence of a biological effect is supported by a few studies that involved low levels of exposure to nicotine without any active smoking.

Another study considered a possible role of nicotine in reducing Parkinson's risk: nicotine stimulates the dopaminergic system of the brain, which is damaged in Parkinson's disease, while other compounds in tobacco smoke inhibit MAO-B, an enzyme which produces oxidative radicals by breaking down dopamine.

A data-driven hypothesis that long-term administration of very low doses of nicotine (for example, in an ordinary diet) might provide a degree of neurological protection against Parkinson's disease remains open as a potential preventive strategy.

== Mental health ==
The high rate of smoking tobacco by people with mental health problems is a major factor in their decreased life expectancy, which is about 25 years shorter than that of the general population.

=== Stress ===
Smokers report higher levels of everyday stress. Several studies have monitored feelings of stress over time and found reduced stress after quitting.

The deleterious mood effects of everyday between-cigarette nicotine withdrawal symptoms explain why people who smoke experience more daily stress than non-smokers, and become less stressed when they quit smoking. Deprivation reversal also explains much of the arousal data, with deprived smokers being less vigilant and less alert than non-deprived smokers or non-smokers.

Recent studies have shown a positive relationship between psychological distress and salivary cotinine levels in smoking and non-smoking adults, indicating that both first-hand and second-hand smoke exposure may lead to higher levels of mental stress.

=== Schizophrenia ===
A very large percentage of schizophrenics smoke tobacco as a form of self-medication.

Some studies suggest that a link exists between smoking and mental illness, citing the high incidence of smoking among those with schizophrenia and smoking lowering age of the onset of psychosis. In 2015, a meta-analysis found that smokers were at greater risk of developing psychotic illness.

However, following the observation that smoking improves the condition of people with schizophrenia, in particular their working memory deficit, nicotine patches had been proposed as a way to treat schizophrenia.

=== Anxiety disorders ===
Recent studies have linked smoking to anxiety disorders, suggesting the correlation (and possibly mechanism) may be related to the broad class of anxiety disorders, and not limited to just depression. Current and ongoing research attempts to explore the addiction-anxiety relationship. Data from multiple studies suggest that anxiety disorders and depression play a role in cigarette smoking. A history of regular smoking was observed more frequently among individuals who had experienced a major depressive disorder at some time in their lives than among individuals who had never experienced major depression or among individuals with no psychiatric diagnosis. People with major depression are also much less likely to quit due to the increased risk of experiencing mild to severe states of depression, including a major depressive episode. Depressed smokers appear to experience more withdrawal symptoms on quitting, are less likely to be successful at quitting, and are more likely to relapse.

== Drug interactions ==
Smoking is known to increase levels of liver enzymes that break down drugs and toxins. That means that drugs cleared by these enzymes are cleared more quickly in smokers, which may result in the drugs not working. Specifically, levels of CYP1A2 and CYP2A6 are induced: substrates for 1A2 include caffeine and tricyclic antidepressants such as amitriptyline; substrates for 2A6 include the anticonvulsant valproic acid.

== Other harm ==
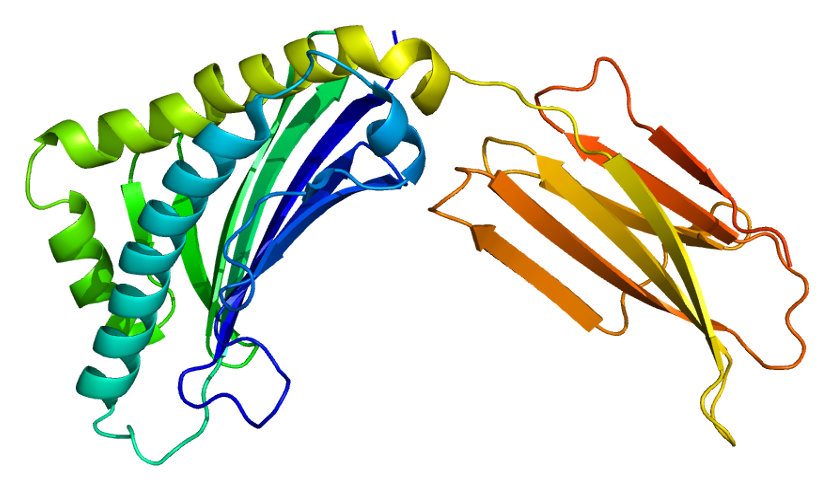
Protein AZGP1

Studies suggest that smoking decreases appetite, but did not conclude that overweight people should smoke or that their health would improve by smoking, because this habit is a cause of heart disease. Smoking also decreases weight by overexpressing the gene AZGP1, which stimulates lipolysis.

Smoking causes about 10% of the global burden of fire deaths, and smokers are placed at an increased risk of injury-related deaths in general, partly due to also experiencing an increased risk of dying in a motor vehicle crash.

Smoking increases the risk of symptoms associated with Crohn's disease (a dose-dependent effect with use of greater than 15 cigarettes per day). There is some evidence for decreased rates of endometriosis in infertile smoking women, although other studies have found that smoking increases the risk in infertile women. There is little or no evidence of a protective effect in fertile women. Some preliminary data from 1996 suggested a reduced incidence of uterine fibroids, but overall the evidence is unconvincing.

Current research shows that tobacco smokers who are exposed to residential radon are twice as likely to develop lung cancer as non-smokers. As well, the risk of developing lung cancer from asbestos exposure is twice as likely for smokers than for non-smokers.

New research has found that women who smoke are at significantly increased risk of developing an abdominal aortic aneurysm, a condition in which a weak area of the abdominal aorta expands or bulges, and is the most common form of aortic aneurysm.

Smoking leads to an increased risk of bone fractures, especially hip fractures. It also leads to slower wound healing after surgery, and an increased rate of postoperative healing complication.

Tobacco smokers are 30-40% more likely to develop type 2 diabetes than non-smokers, and the risk increases with the number of cigarettes smoked. Furthermore, diabetic smokers have worse outcomes than diabetic non-smokers.

== Claimed benefits ==
=== History of claimed benefits ===
In 1888, an article appeared in Scientific American discussing potential germicidal activity of tobacco smoke providing immunity against yellow fever epidemic of Florida inspiring research in the lab of Vincenzo Tassinari at the Hygienic Institute of the University of Pisa, who explored the antimicrobial activity against pathogens including Bacillus anthracis, Mycobacterium tuberculosis, Bacillus prodigiosus, Staphylococcus aureus, and others. Carbon monoxide is a bioactive component of tobacco smoke that has been explored for its antimicrobial properties against many of these pathogens.

On epidemiological grounds, unexpected correlations between smoking and favorable outcomes initially emerged in the context of cardiovascular disease, where they were described as a smoker's paradox (or smoking paradox). The term smoker's paradox was coined in 1995 in relation to reports that smokers appeared to have unexpectedly good short-term outcomes following acute coronary syndrome or stroke. One of the first reports of an apparent smoker's paradox was published in 1968 based on an observation of relatively decreased mortality in smokers one month after experiencing acute myocardial infarction. In the same year, a case–control study first suggested a possible protective role in Parkinson's disease.

Historical claims of possible benefits in schizophrenia, whereby smoking was thought to ameliorate cognitive symptoms, are not supported by current evidence.

=== Other benefits ===
Against the background of the overwhelmingly negative effects of smoking on health, some observational studies have suggested that smoking might have specific beneficial effects, including in the field of cardiovascular disease. Interest in this epidemiological phenomenon has also been aroused by COVID-19. Systematic review of reports that suggested smokers respond better to treatment for ischemic stroke provided no support for such claims.

Claims of surprising benefits of smoking, based on observational data, have also been made for Parkinson's disease, and a variety of other conditions, including basal-cell carcinoma, melanoma, acute mountain sickness, pemphigus, celiac disease, and ulcerative colitis, among others.

Tobacco smoke has many bioactive substances, including nicotine, that exert a variety of systemic effects. Surprising correlations may also stem from non-biological factors such as residual confounding (that is to say, the methodological difficulties in completely adjusting for every confounding factor that can affect outcomes in observational studies).

For example, in his book Probably Overthinking It, the author Allen B. Downey dissects how a misinterpretation of data on low birth weight of babies born to smoking mothers delayed public-health recommendations against smoking during pregnancy by almost a decade. While smoking caused a significantly lower birth weight, most of the babies born to the smoking mothers were more or less healthy, while the babies with comparable weight born to the non-smoking mothers had congenital diseases, which increased their mortality rate.

== Mechanisms of negative health effects ==
=== Chemical carcinogens ===
Benzopyrene diol epoxide, an extremely carcinogenic (cancer-causing) metabolite of benzopyrene, a polycyclic aromatic hydrocarbon produced by burning tobacco

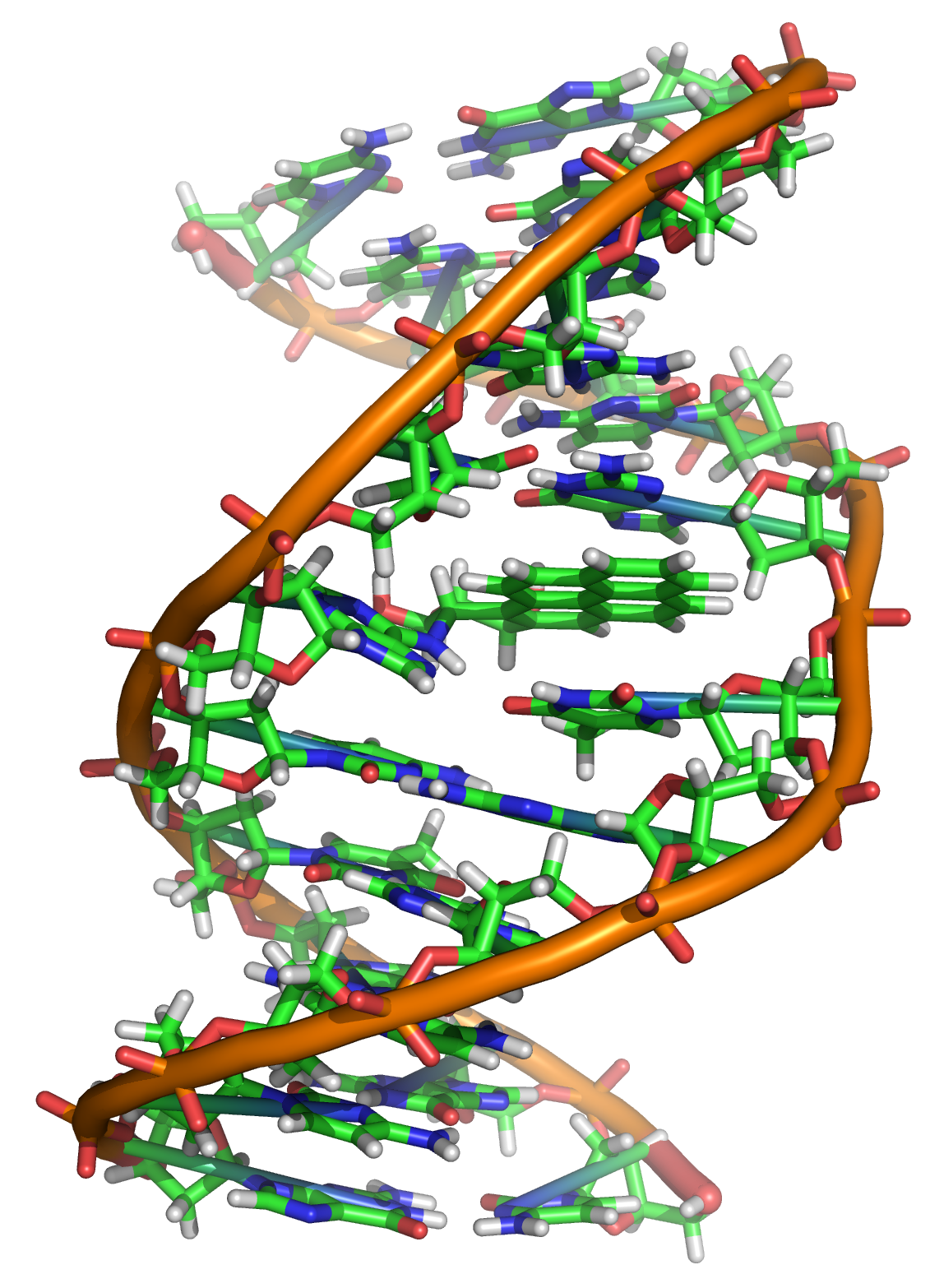
Benzopyrene, a major mutagen in tobacco smoke, in an adduct to DNA

Smoke, or any partially burnt organic matter, contains carcinogens (cancer-causing agents). The potential effects of smoking, such as lung cancer, can take up to 20 years to manifest themselves. Historically, women began smoking en masse later than men, so an increased death rate caused by smoking among women did not appear until later. The male lung cancer death rate decreased in 1975—roughly 20 years after the initial decline in cigarette consumption in men. A fall in consumption in women also began in 1975 but by 1991 had not manifested in a decrease in lung cancer–related mortalities among women.

Smoke contains several carcinogenic pyrolytic products that bind to DNA and cause genetic mutations. Particularly potent carcinogens are polycyclic aromatic hydrocarbons (PAH), which are toxicated to mutagenic epoxides. The first PAH to be identified as a carcinogen in tobacco smoke was benzopyrene, which has been shown to form into an epoxide that irreversibly attaches to a cell's nuclear DNA, which may either kill the cell or cause a genetic mutation. If the mutation inhibits programmed cell death, the cell can survive to become a cancer cell. Similarly, acrolein, which is abundant in tobacco smoke, also irreversibly binds to DNA, causes mutations and thus also cancer. However, it needs no activation to become carcinogenic.

There are over 19 known carcinogens in cigarette smoke. The following are some of the most potent carcinogens:

- Polycyclic aromatic hydrocarbons are tar components produced by pyrolysis in smoldering organic matter and emitted into smoke. Several of these PAH's are already toxic in their normal form, however, many of them can become more toxic to the liver. Due to the hydrophobic nature of PAH's they do not dissolve in water and are hard to expel from the body. In order to make the PAH more soluble in water, the liver creates an enzyme called Cytochrome P450 which adds an additional oxygen to the PAH, turning it into a mutagenic epoxide, which is more soluble but also more reactive. The first PAH to be identified as a carcinogen in tobacco smoke was benzopyrene, which been shown to toxicate into a diol epoxide and then permanently attach to nuclear DNA, which may either kill the cell or cause a genetic mutation. The DNA contains the information on how the cell functions; in practice, it contains the recipes for protein synthesis. If the mutation inhibits programmed cell death, the cell can survive to become a cancer, a cell that does not function like a normal cell. The carcinogenicity is radiomimetic, i.e. similar to that produced by ionizing nuclear radiation. Tobacco manufacturers have experimented with combustionless vaporizer technology to allow cigarettes to be consumed without the formation of carcinogenic benzopyrenes.
- Acrolein is a pyrolysis product that is abundant in cigarette smoke. It gives smoke an acrid smell and an irritating, tear-causing effect and is a major contributor to its carcinogenicity. Like PAH metabolites, acrolein is also an electrophilic alkylating agent and permanently binds to the DNA base guanine, by a conjugate addition followed by cyclization into a hemiaminal. The acrolein-guanine adduct induces mutations during DNA copying and thus causes cancers in a manner similar to PAHs. However, acrolein is 1000 times more abundant than PAHs in cigarette smoke and can react without metabolic activation. Acrolein has been shown to be a mutagen and carcinogen in human cells. The carcinogenicity of acrolein has been difficult to study by animal experimentation, because it has such a toxicity that it tends to kill the animals before they develop cancer. Generally, compounds which react by conjugate addition as electrophiles (so-called Michael acceptors after the Michael reaction) are toxic and carcinogenic, because they can permanently alkylate DNA, similarly to mustard gas or aflatoxin. Acrolein is only one of them present in cigarette smoke; for example, crotonaldehyde has been found in cigarette smoke. Michael acceptors also contribute to the chronic inflammation present in diseases brought about by smoking.
- Nitrosamines are a group of carcinogenic compounds found in cigarette smoke but not in uncured tobacco leaves. Nitrosamines form on flue-cured tobacco leaves during the curing process through a chemical reaction between nicotine and other compounds contained in the uncured leaf and various oxides of nitrogen found in all combustion gases. Switching to indirect fire curing has been shown to reduce nitrosamine levels to less than 0.1 parts per million.

Sidestream tobacco smoke, or exhaled mainstream smoke, is particularly harmful. Because exhaled smoke is at lower temperatures than inhaled smoke, chemical compounds undergo changes that can make them more dangerous. Smoke chemical composition undergoes changes in time, which causes the transformation of the compound NO into the more toxic NO_{2}. Further, volatilization causes smoke particles to become smaller, and thus more easily embedded deep into the lungs of anyone breathes them in.

=== Radioactive carcinogens ===
In addition to chemical, nonradioactive carcinogens, chewing tobacco and tobacco smoke contain small amounts of lead-210 (^{210}Pb) and polonium-210 (^{210}Po), both of which are radioactive carcinogens. The presence of polonium-210 in mainstream cigarette smoke has been experimentally measured at levels of 0.0263–0.036 pCi (0.97–1.33 mBq), which is equivalent to about 0.1 pCi per milligram of smoke (4 mBq/mg); or about 0.81 pCi of lead-210 per gram of dry condensed smoke (30 Bq/kg).

Research by NCAR radiochemist Ed Martell suggested that radioactive compounds in cigarette smoke are deposited in "hot spots" where bronchial tubes branch, that tar from cigarette smoke is resistant to dissolving in lung fluid and that radioactive compounds have a great deal of time to undergo radioactive decay before being cleared by natural processes. Indoors, these radioactive compounds can linger in passive smoke, and greater exposure would occur when these radioactive compounds are inhaled during normal breathing, which is deeper and longer than when inhaling cigarettes. Damage to the protective epithelial tissue from smoking only increases the prolonged retention of insoluble polonium-210 compounds produced from burning tobacco. Martell estimated that a localized carcinogenic radiation dose of 80–100 rads is delivered to the lung tissue of most smokers who die of lung cancer.

Smoking an average of 1.5 packs per day may give a high localized dose to the bronchial epithelial a radiation dose up to 60–160 mSv/year. However, estimates vary and the effective dose to the lungs ranges between 0.3 mSv/year to 20 mSv/year.

Some of the mineral apatite in Florida used to produce phosphate for US tobacco crops contains uranium, radium, lead-210, and polonium-210 and radon. The radioactive smoke from tobacco fertilized this way is deposited in lungs and releases radiation even if a smoker quits the habit. The combination of carcinogenic tar and radiation in a sensitive organ such as lungs increases the risk of cancer.

In contrast, a 1999 review of tobacco smoke carcinogens published in the Journal of the National Cancer Institute states that "levels of polonium-210 in tobacco smoke are not believed to be great enough to significantly impact lung cancer in smokers." In 2011 Hecht has also stated that the "levels of ^{210}Po in cigarette smoke are probably too low to be involved in lung cancer induction".

=== Oxidation and inflammation ===
Free radicals and pro-oxidants in cigarettes damage blood vessels and oxidize LDL cholesterol. Only oxidized LDL cholesterol is taken-up by macrophages, which become foam cells, leading to atherosclerotic plaques. Cigarette smoke increases proinflammatory cytokines in the bloodstream, causing atherosclerosis. The pro-oxidative state also leads to endothelial dysfunction, which is another important cause of atherosclerosis.

=== Nicotine ===
Nicotine molecule

Nicotine, which is contained in cigarettes and other smoked tobacco products, is a stimulant and is one of the main factors leading to continued tobacco smoking. Nicotine is a highly addictive psychoactive chemical. When tobacco is smoked, most of the nicotine is pyrolyzed; a dose sufficient to cause mild somatic dependency and mild to strong psychological dependency remains. The amount of nicotine absorbed by the body from smoking depends on many factors, including the type of tobacco, whether the smoke is inhaled, and whether a filter is used. There is also a formation of harmane (a MAO inhibitor) from the acetaldehyde in cigarette smoke, which seems to play an important role in nicotine addiction probably by facilitating dopamine release in the nucleus accumbens in response to nicotine stimuli. According to studies by Henningfield and Benowitz, nicotine is more addictive than cannabis, caffeine, alcohol, cocaine, and heroin when considering both somatic and psychological dependence. However, due to the stronger withdrawal effects of alcohol, cocaine, and heroin, nicotine may have a lower potential for somatic dependence than these substances. About half of Canadians who currently smoke have tried to quit. McGill University health professor Jennifer O'Loughlin stated that nicotine addiction can occur as soon as five months after the start of smoking.

Ingesting a compound by smoking is one of the most rapid and efficient methods of introducing it into the bloodstream, second only to injection, which allows for the rapid feedback which supports the smokers' ability to titrate their dosage. On average it takes about ten seconds for the substance to reach the brain. As a result of the efficiency of this delivery system, many smokers feel as though they are unable to cease. Those who achieve one year of continuous abstinence are highly likely to remain so, with the vast majority of relapses occurring within the first eight days after attempting cessation.

There exists a possibility of depression in some who attempt cessation, as with other psychoactive substances. Depression is also common in teenage smokers; teens who smoke are four times as likely to develop depressive symptoms as their non-smoking peers.

Although nicotine does play a role in acute episodes of some diseases (including stroke, impotence, and heart disease) by its stimulation of adrenaline release, which raises blood pressure, heart and respiration rate, and free fatty acids, the most serious longer term effects are more the result of the products of the smoldering combustion process. This has led to the development of various nicotine delivery systems, such as the nicotine patch or nicotine gum, that can satisfy the addictive craving by delivering nicotine without the harmful combustion by-products. This can help the heavily dependent smoker to quit gradually while discontinuing further damage to health.

Recent evidence has shown that smoking tobacco increases the release of dopamine in the brain, specifically in the mesolimbic pathway, the same neuro-reward circuit activated by addictive substances such as heroin and cocaine. This suggests nicotine use has a pleasurable effect that triggers positive reinforcement. One study found that smokers exhibit better reaction-time and memory performance compared to non-smokers, which is consistent with increased activation of dopamine receptors. Neurologically, rodent studies have found that nicotine self-administration causes lowering of reward thresholds—a finding opposite that of most other addictive substances (e.g., cocaine and heroin).

The carcinogenity of tobacco smoke is not explained by nicotine per se, which is not carcinogenic or mutagenic, although it is a metabolic precursor for several compounds which are. In addition, it inhibits apoptosis, therefore accelerating existing cancers. Also, NNK, a nicotine derivative converted from nicotine, can be carcinogenic.

The addictive potential of nicotine is increased after co-administration of a MAOI, which specifically causes sensitization of the locomotor response in rats, a measure of addictive potential.

== Forms of exposure ==
=== Cigarettes ===
Manufactured cigarettes represent the most prevalent form of tobacco consumption globally, accounting for approximately 70% to 80% of all tobacco use.

In addition to the inherent risks of tobacco use, manufactured cigarettes have specific engineering and chemical modifications that introduce secondary harms. Modern commercial cigarettes utilize filter ventilation (small perforations in the filter), which were historically marketed to reduce tar but actually encourage "compensatory smoking", where users inhale more deeply to maintain nicotine levels. The manufacturing process also incorporates approximately 600 additives, such as ammonia, which is used to "freebase" nicotine for faster absorption into the brain, and sugars that, when burned, produce the carcinogen acetaldehyde.

Nearly all manufactured cigarettes in the U.S. and EU are classified as fire-safe cigarettes, which requires manufacturers to add chemicals to the paper to extinguish the cigarette if left unattended. Some studies and consumer reports have linked these treated papers to increased levels of carbon monoxide and naphthalene in the smoke and unique side effects like increased respiratory irritation and headaches compared to other tobacco products.

=== Passive smoke ===
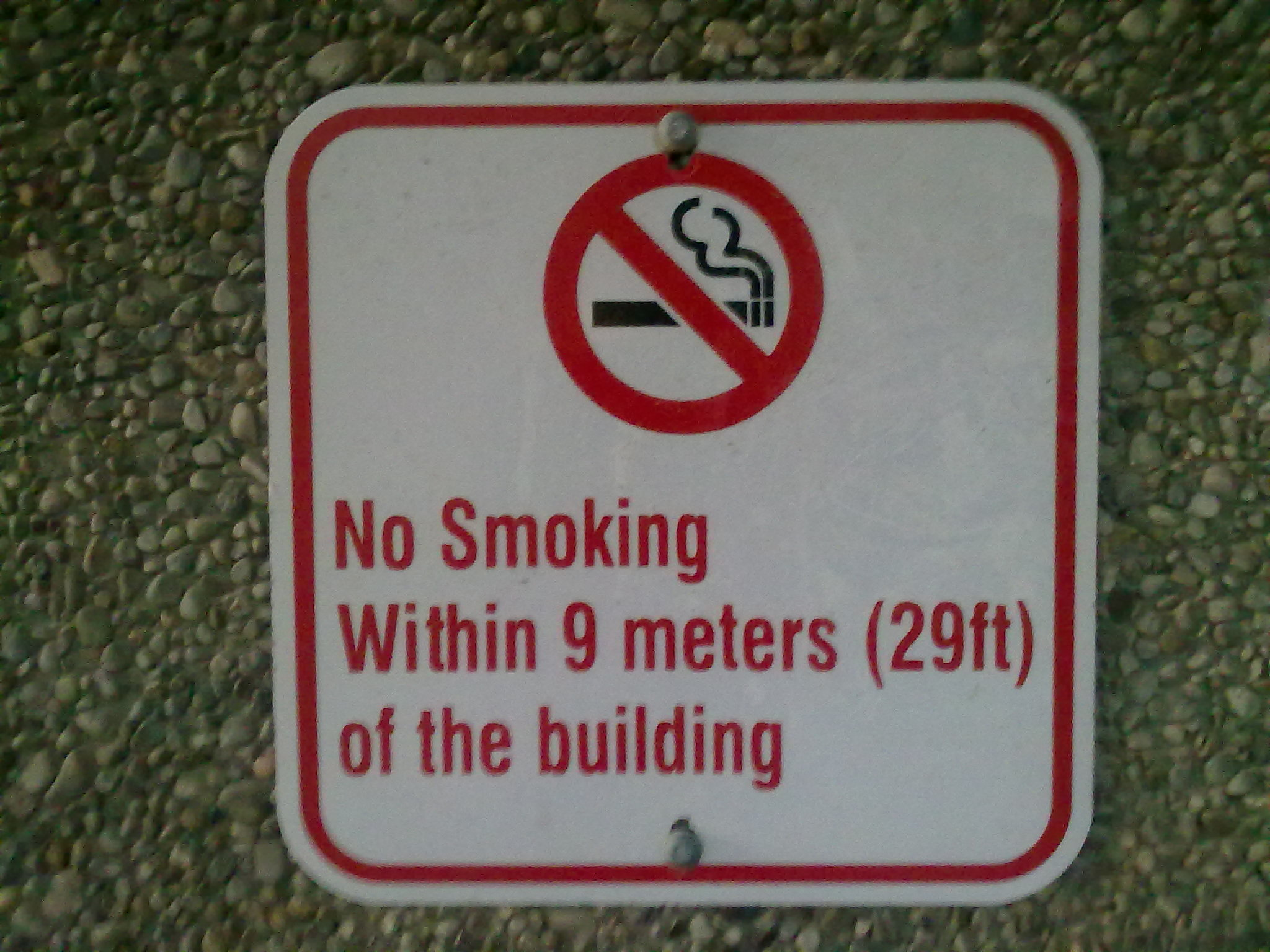
Posted sign to avoid passive smoking in York University, Toronto, Ontario, Canada

Passive smoke is a mixture of smoke from the burning end of a cigarette, pipe, or cigar, and the smoke exhaled from the lungs of smokers. It is involuntarily inhaled, lingers in the air hours after cigarettes have been extinguished, and may cause a wide range of adverse health effects, including cancer, respiratory infections, and asthma.

Studies have shown that exposure to passive smoke causes harmful effects on the cardiovascular system and is associated with prevalent heart failure among non-smokers. Non-smokers who are exposed to passive smoke at home or work are thought, due to a wide variety of statistical studies, to increase their heart disease risk by 25–30% and their lung cancer risk by 20–30%. According to the World Health Organization, passive smoke is reported to kill about 1 million people per year and causes numerous diseases including cancer and heart diseases.

The current US Surgeon General's Report concludes that there is no established risk-free level of exposure to passive smoke. Short exposures to passive smoke are believed to cause blood platelets to become stickier, damage the lining of blood vessels, decrease coronary flow velocity reserves, and reduce heart rate variability, potentially increasing the mortality of heart attacks. New research indicates that private research conducted by cigarette company Philip Morris in the 1980s showed that passive smoke was toxic, yet the company suppressed the finding during the next two decades.

=== Cigars ===
Like other forms of smoking, cigar smoking poses a significant health risk depending on dosage: risks are greater for those who inhale more when they smoke, smoke more cigars, or smoke them longer. The risk of dying from any cause is significantly greater for cigar smokers, with the risk particularly higher for smokers less than 65 years old, and with risk for moderate and deep inhalers reaching levels similar to cigarette smokers. The increased risk for those smoking 1–2 cigars per day is too small to be statistically significant, and the health risks of the 3/4 of cigar smokers who smoke less than daily are not known and are hard to measure.

Although it has been claimed that people who smoke fewer than five cigars a day have no increased risks, a more accurate statement is that their risks are proportionate to their exposure. Health risks are similar to cigarette smoking in nicotine addiction, periodontal health, tooth loss, and many types of cancer, including cancers of the mouth, throat, and esophagus.

Cigar smoking can also cause cancers of the lung and larynx, where the increased risk is less than that of cigarettes. Many of these cancers have extremely low cure rates. Cigar smoking also increases the risk of lung and heart diseases such as chronic obstructive pulmonary disease (COPD).

=== Hookahs ===
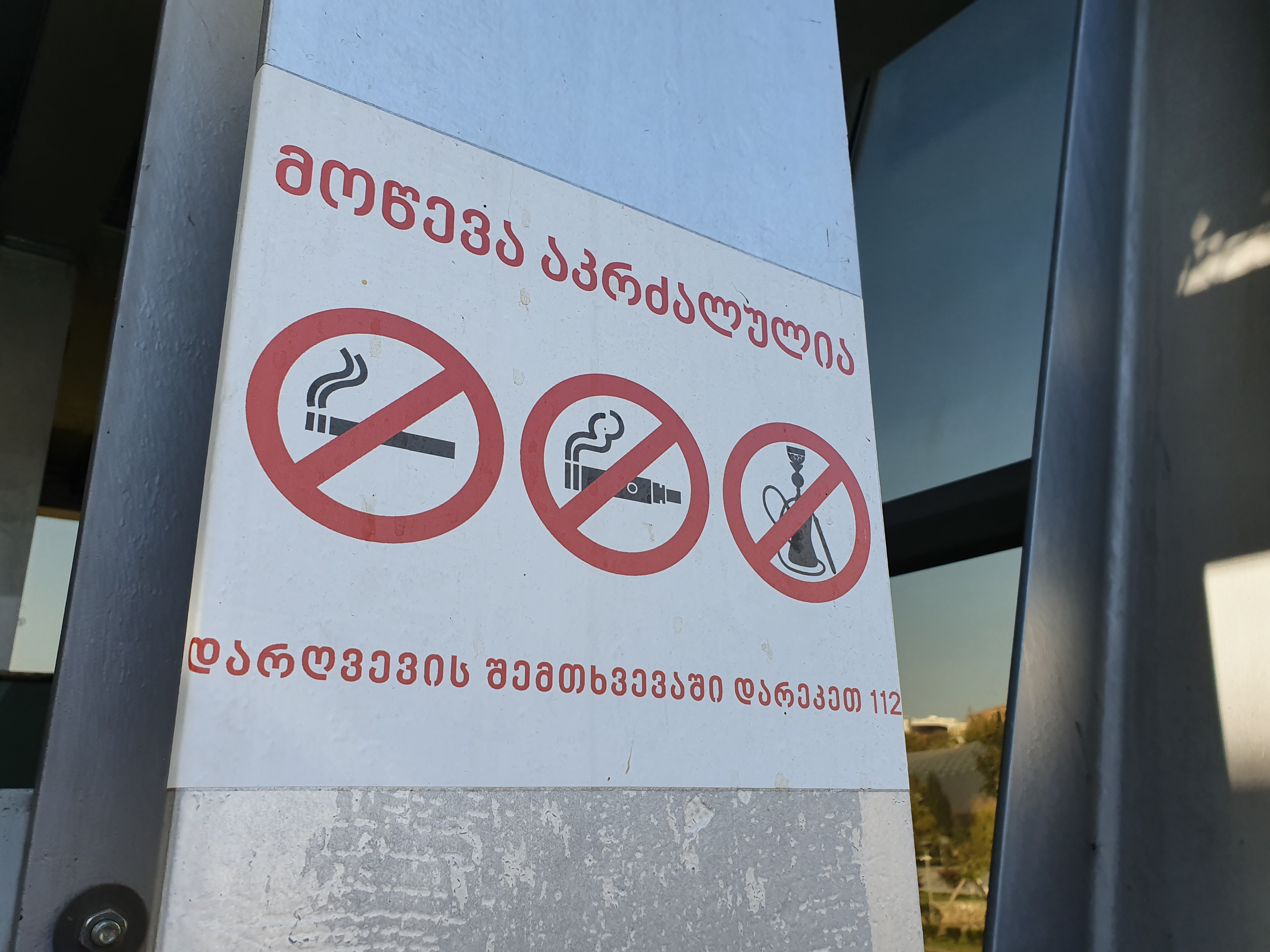
A sign forbidding the use of cigarettes, e-cigarettes and hookah in Tbilisi, Georgia

A common belief among users is that the smoke of a hookah (waterpipe, narghile) is significantly less dangerous than that from cigarettes. The water moisture induced by the hookah makes the smoke less irritating and may give a false sense of security and reduce concerns about true health effects. Doctors at institutions including the Mayo Clinic have stated that use of hookah can be as detrimental to a person's health as smoking cigarettes, and a study by the World Health Organization also confirmed these findings. Although the smoking effects are similar to a cigarettes, due to the manner in which a hookah is utilized, smoking hookah may potentially absorb a higher amount of toxic substances, compared to cigarette smokers.

Each hookah session typically lasts more than 40 minutes, and consists of 50 to 200 inhalations that each range from 0.15 to 0.50 liters of smoke. In an hour-long smoking session of hookah, users consume about 100 to 200 times the smoke of a single cigarette; A study in the Journal of Periodontology found that water pipe smokers were marginally more likely than regular smokers to show signs of gum disease, showing rates 5-fold higher than non-smokers rather than the 3.8-fold risk that regular smokers show. A systematic review on waterpipe smoking and cancer reports that waterpipe smokers had significantly higher, up to six times odds of lung cancer compared to non-smokers.

A study on hookah smoking and cancer in Pakistan was published in 2008. Its objective was "to find serum CEA levels in ever/exclusive hookah smokers, i.e. those who smoked only hookah (no cigarettes, bidis, etc.), prepared between 1 and 4 times a day with a quantity of up to 120 g of a tobacco-molasses mixture each (i.e. the tobacco weight equivalent of up to 60 cigarettes of 1 g each) and consumed in 1 to 8 sessions". Carcinoembryonic antigen (CEA) is a marker found in several cancers. Levels in exclusive hookah smokers were lower compared to cigarette smokers, although the difference was not as statistically significant as that between a hookah smoker and a non-smoker. Also, the study concluded that heavy hookah smoking (2–4 daily preparations; 3–8 sessions a day; >2 hrs to ≤ 6 hours) substantially raises CEA levels. Hookah smokers were nearly 6 times more likely to develop lung cancer than healthy non-smokers in Kashmir.

== History ==
=== Pre-cigarette ===
Texts on the harmful effects of smoking tobacco were recorded in the Timbuktu manuscripts. James I wrote a book that denounced tobacco smoking as: "loathsome to the eye, hateful to the nose, harmful to the brain, dangerous to the lungs". Pipe smoking gradually became generally accepted as a cause of mouth cancers following work done in the 1700s. "An association between a variety of cancers and tobacco use was repeatedly observed from the late 1800s into the early 1920s."

Gideon Lincecum, an American naturalist and practitioner of botanical medicine, wrote in the early 19th century on tobacco: "This poisonous plant has been used a great deal as a medicine by the old school faculty, and thousands have been slain by it. ... It is a very dangerous article, and use it as you will, it always diminishes the vital energies in exact proportion to the quantity used – it may be slowly, but it is very sure."

The 1880s invention of automated cigarette-making machinery in the American South made it possible to mass-produce cigarettes at low cost, and smoking became common. This led to a backlash and a tobacco prohibition movement, which challenged tobacco use as harmful and brought about some bans on tobacco sale and use. In 1912, American Dr. Isaac Adler was the first to strongly suggest that lung cancer is related to smoking. In 1924, economist Irving Fisher wrote an anti-smoking article for Reader's Digest which said "tobacco lowers the whole tone of the body and decreases its vital power and resistance ... tobacco acts like a narcotic poison, like opium, and like alcohol, though usually in a less degree". In December 1952, the Reader's Digest reprinted an article titled Cancer by the Carton which outlined the research links between smoking and lung cancer.

Prior to World War I, lung cancer was considered to be a rare disease, which most physicians would never see during their career. With the postwar rise in popularity of cigarette smoking, however, came an epidemic of lung cancer. For instance, it is estimated that "35 to 79 percent of excess veteran deaths due to heart disease and lung cancer are attributable to military-induced smoking"

=== Early observational studies ===
From the 1890s onwards, associations of tobacco use with cancers and vascular disease were regularly reported. In 1930, Fritz Lickint of Dresden, Germany, published a meta-analysis citing 167 other works to link tobacco use to lung cancer. Lickint showed that people with lung cancer were likely to be smokers. He also argued that smoking tobacco was the best way to explain the fact that lung cancer struck men four or five times more often than women (since women smoked much less), and discussed the causal effect of smoking on cancers of the liver and bladder.

It may be suggested that the chief reason that the subject has received so little attention from members of the medical profession is that the majority of them as of the general community practice smoking in one form of another, and do not wish to inquire too closely into a habit in defense of which so much can be said from the hedonistic but so little from the hygienic standpoint

— Rolleston JD (July 1932). "The Cigarette Habit". Addiction. 30 (1): 1–27. doi:10.1111/j.1360-0443.1932.tb04849.x. S2CID 72586449.

More observational evidence was published throughout the 1930s, and in 1938, Science published a paper showing that tobacco smokers live substantially shorter lives. It built a survival curve from family history records kept at the Johns Hopkins School of Hygiene and Public Health. This result was ignored or incorrectly explained away.

An association between smoking tobacco and heart attacks was first mentioned in 1930; a large case–control study found a significant association in 1940, but avoided saying anything about cause, on the grounds that such a conclusion would cause controversy and doctors were not yet ready for it.

Official hostility to tobacco use was widespread in Nazi Germany, where case-control studies were published in 1939 and 1943. The Institute for the Struggle against the Dangers of Tobacco (German: Wissenschaftliches Institut zur Erforschung der Tabakgefahren) was set up at the University of Jena in 1942. It was one of the first scientific institutes to discover the dangers of smoking tobacco, including the link between smoking and lung cancer. However, due to its relationship with the Nazi regime, its work was not taken seriously after the Second World War.

Another was published in the Netherlands in 1948. A case-control study on lung cancer and smoking, done in 1939 by Franz Hermann Müller, had serious weaknesses in its methodology, but study design problems were better addressed in subsequent studies. The association of anti-tobacco smoking research and public health measures with the Nazi leadership may have contributed to the lack of attention paid to these studies. They were also published in German and Dutch. These studies were widely ignored. In 1947 the British Medical Council held a conference to discuss the reason for the rise in lung cancer deaths; unaware of the German studies, they planned and started their own.

Five case-control studies published in 1950 by researchers from the US and UK did draw widespread attention. The strongest results were found by "Smoking and carcinoma of the lung. Preliminary report", by Richard Doll and Austin Bradford Hill, and the 1950 Wynder and Graham Study, entitled "Tobacco Smoking as a Possible Etiologic Factor in Bronchiogenic Carcinoma: A Study of Six Hundred and Eighty-Four Proved Cases". These two studies were the largest, and the only ones to carefully exclude ex-smokers from their non-smokers group. The other three studies also reported that, to quote one, "smoking was powerfully implicated in the causation of lung cancer". The Doll and Hill paper reported that "heavy smokers were fifty times as likely as non-smokers to contract lung cancer".

=== Causality ===
Early case-control studies clearly showed a close association between smoking and lung cancer, but contemporary doctors and scientists did not feel evidence existed for causality. Follow-up large prospective cohort studies in the early 1950s showed clearly that smokers died faster, and were more likely to die of lung cancer, cardiovascular disease, and a list of other diseases which lengthened as the studies continued

The British Doctors Study, a longitudinal study of some 40,000 doctors, began in 1951. By 1954 it had evidence from three years of doctors' deaths, based on which the government issued advice that smoking and lung cancer rates were related (the British Doctors Study last reported in 2001, by which time there were approximately 40 linked diseases). The British Doctors Study demonstrated that about half of the persistent cigarette smokers born in 1900–1909 were eventually killed by their addiction.

=== Public awareness ===
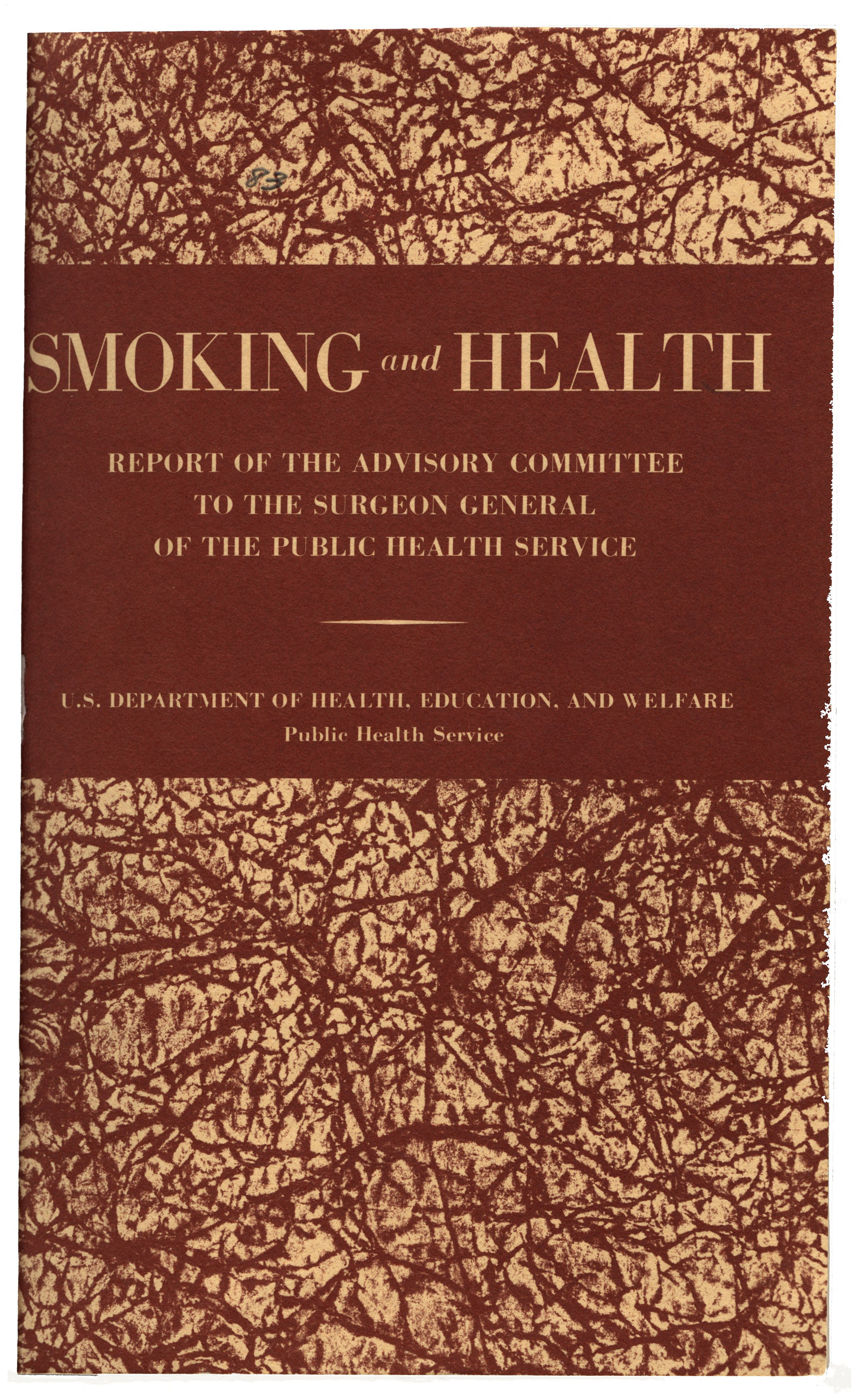
The landmark 1964 US Surgeon General's report on Smoking and Health.

In 1953, scientists at the Sloan Kettering Institute in New York City demonstrated that cigarette tar painted on the skin of mice caused fatal cancers. This work attracted much media attention; the New York Times and Life both covered the issue. The Reader's Digest published an article entitled "Cancer by the Carton".

On January 11, 1964, the United States Surgeon General's Report on Smoking and Health was published; this led millions of American smokers to quit, the banning of certain types of advertising, and required warning labels on tobacco products.

These results were first widely accepted in the medical community and publicized among the general public in the mid-1960s. The medical community's resistance to the idea that smoking tobacco caused disease has been attributed to bias from nicotine-dependent doctors, the novelty of the adaptations needed to apply epidemiological techniques and heuristics to non-infectious diseases, and cigarette industry pressure.

The harmful health effects of smoking have been significant for the development of the science of epidemiology. As the mechanism of carcinogenicity is radiomimetic or radiological, the effects are stochastic. Definite statements can be made only on the relatively increased or decreased probabilities of contracting a given disease. For a particular individual, it is impossible to definitively prove a direct causal link between exposure to a radiomimetic poison such as tobacco smoke and the cancer that follows; such statements can only be made at the aggregate population level. Cigarette companies have capitalized on this philosophical objection and exploited the doubts of clinicians, who consider only individual cases, on the causal link in the stochastic expression of the toxicity as an actual disease.

Multiple lawsuits have been filed against tobacco companies for having researched the health effects of smoking, but having then suppressed the findings or formatted them to imply lessened or no hazard.

After a ban on smoking in all enclosed public places was introduced in Scotland in March 2006, there was a 17 percent reduction in hospital admissions for acute coronary syndrome during the ten months after the ban, compared with the ten preceding months.

== See also ==
- List of tobacco-related topics
- Health effects of chewing tobacco
- Health effects of electronic cigarettes
- Health effects of snus
- Smokeless tobacco
- Tobacco control

== Bibliography ==
- Abrams, David B., et al. "Cigarettes: The rise and decline but not demise of the greatest behavioral health disaster of the 20th century." in R. Kaplan, M Spittel, D David (Eds.) Emerging Behavioral and Social Science Perspectives on Population Health (AHRQ Publication 15-0002 (2015): 143–68. online
- Boyle, Peter; Nigel Gray, Jack Henningfield, John Seffrin, and Witold Zatonski, Tobacco: Science, Policy and Public Health, Oxford University Press, second edition, 2010, 776 pages (ISBN 9780199566655).
- Brandt, Allan M. The Cigarette Century: The Rise, Fall, and Deadly Persistence of the Product That Defined America (Basic Books. 2007) online Review of this book.
- Drope, Jeffrey, et al. "Who's Still Smoking? Disparities in Adult Cigarette Smoking Prevalence in the United States," CA: A Cancer Journal for Clinicians (2018) 68:106–115. doi: 10.3322/caac.21444
- Frieden, Thomas R. et al. The Health Consequences of Smoking: 50 Years of Progress: A Report of the Surgeon General (2014) online
- Gardner, Martha N. "Risk, pleasure, and change: Using the cigarette to teach US cultural history." The History Teacher 47.1 (2013): 9–24. online
- Keirle, Philip. "Citizens and the cigarette: The civic dimensions of America's earliest, youth-targeted, mass-mediated anti-cigarette campaign." Journal of consumer culture 13.1 (2013): 3–24.
- Kluger, Richard. Ashes to Ashes: America's Hundred-Year Cigarette War, the Public Health, and the Unabashed Trium ph of Philip Morris (Vintage, 1997) online.
- Lichtenstein P, Holm NV, Verkasalo PK, Iliadou A, Kaprio J, Koskenvuo M, Pukkala E, Skytthe A, Hemminki K (July 2000). "Environmental and heritable factors in the causation of cancer—analyses of cohorts of twins from Sweden, Denmark, and Finland". The New England Journal of Medicine. 343 (2): 78–85. doi:10.1056/NEJM200007133430201. PMID 10891514.
- Mathers, Colin; Boerma, Ties; Fat, Doris Ma (2008). The Global Burden of Disease: 2004 Update (PDF). World Health Organization. hdl:10665/43942. ISBN 978-92-4-156371-0. OCLC 264018380. Archived from the original on 7 February 2022.
- Milov, Sarah. The cigarette: A political history (Harvard University Press, 2019) online.
- Montesano R, Hall J (October 2001). "Environmental causes of human cancers". European Journal of Cancer. 37 (Suppl 8): S67–87. doi:10.1016/S0959-8049(01)00266-0. PMID 11602374.
- Nathanson, Constance A. Disease prevention and social change, the state, society, and public health in the United States, France, Great Britain, and Canada (Russell Sage Foundation, 2007) . pp.109–160.
- Oreskes, Naomi, and Erik M. Conway. Merchants of doubt: How a handful of scientists obscured the truth on issues from tobacco smoke to global warming (Bloomsbury Publishing USA, 2011).
- Proctor, Robert N. "The history of the discovery of the cigarette–lung cancer link: evidentiary traditions, corporate denial, global toll." Tobacco control 21.2 (2012): 87–91. online
- "Chapter 1: Introduction and Approach to Causal Inference" (PDF). 2004 Surgeon General's Report—The Health Consequences of Smoking (PDF). Washington DC: Department of Health and Human Services, Centers for Disease Control and Prevention, National Center for Chronic Disease Prevention and Health Promotion, Office on Smoking and Health. 2004.
- WHO Report on the Global Tobacco Epidemic 2008: The MPOWER Package (PDF). World Health Organization. 2008. pp. 6, 8, 20. ISBN 978-92-4-068311-2. OCLC 476167599. Archived from the original (PDF) on 21 January 2022.
- Surgeon General of the United States (1964). Smoking and Health: Report of the Advisory Committee to the Surgeon General of the Public Health Service (PDF) (Report). Department of Health, Education, and Welfare. Public Health Service Publication No. 1103. Archived from the original on 28 July 2022.
- "The health consequences of involuntary exposure to tobacco smoke: a report of the Surgeon General". Atlanta, U.S.: U.S. Department of Health and Human Services, Centers for Disease Control and Prevention, National Center for Chronic Disease Prevention and Health Promotion, Office on Smoking and Health. 2006. Archived from the original on 2020-10-25.
- "Cancer Facts and Figures 2004: Basic Cancer Facts". American Cancer Society. Archived from the original on 2009-02-12.
