= Tobacco Induced Diseases =

- Discipline: Health effects of tobacco
- Language: English
- Edited by: James Elliott Scott, Israel Agaku

Publication details
- History: 2002-present
- Publisher: International Society for the Prevention of Tobacco Induced Diseases
- Frequency: Continuous
- Open access: Yes
- License: CC BY 4.0
- Impact factor: 2.092 (2016)

Standard abbreviations
- ISO 4: Tob. Induc. Dis.

Indexing
- CODEN: TIDOAI
- ISSN: 1617-9625 (print); 2070-7266 (web)
- LCCN: 2009243493
- OCLC no.: 1028111942

Links
- Journal homepage; Online archive

Tobacco Induced Diseases is a peer-reviewed open access medical journal covering all aspects of the adverse health effects of tobacco use. It was established in 2002 and is published by the International Society for the Prevention of Tobacco Induced Diseases, of which it is the official journal. Between 2007 and 2017 it was published by BioMed Central on behalf of the society. As of January 2018, the journal is again published directly by the society. The editors-in-chief are James Elliott Scott (University of Manitoba) and Israel Agaku (U.S. Centers for Disease Control and Prevention and Harvard School of Dental Medicine).

== Abstracting and indexing ==
The journal is abstracted and indexed in:

- Chemical Abstracts Service
- CINAHL
- Current Contents/Social & Behavioral Sciences
- Embase
- Science Citation Index Expanded
- Scopus
- Social Sciences Citation Index

According to the Journal Citation Reports, the journal has a 2016 impact factor of 2.092.
