= Deepa Narayan =

Deepa Narayan (Deepa Narayan-Parker) is a social scientist who authored and co-authored more than 15 books including Chup: Breaking The Silence About India's Women. She is also an independent advisor for poverty, development and poverty and has experience working for the World Bank, United Nations and various NGOs. She has been listed as one of the top 100 Global Thinkers by Foreign Policy magazine in 2011, and part of the top 100 Disruptive Heroes by Hacking Work.

== Background ==
Narayan has a PhD in Psychology and Anthropology.

== List of works ==
This includes titles which have been authored, co-authored or edited by Narayan:

- Chup: Breaking The Silence About India's Women
- Empowerment and Poverty Reduction : A Sourcebook
- Ending Poverty in South Asia: Ideas That Work
- Moving Out of Poverty : Volume 1. Cross-Disciplinary Perspectives on Mobility
- Moving Out of Poverty : Volume 2. Success from the Bottom Up
- Moving Out of Poverty : Volume 3. The Promise of Empowerment and Democracy in India
- Moving Out of Poverty : Volume 4. Rising from the Ashes of Conflict
- Measuring Empowerment: Cross-disciplinary Perspectives

== See also ==
- Moving Out of Poverty
