= Participatory poverty assessment =

Participatory poverty assessment (PPA) is the approach to analyzing and reducing poverty by incorporating the views of the poor. PPAs attempt to better understand the poor, to give the poor more influence over decisions that affect their lives, and to increase effectiveness of poverty reduction policies. PPAs are seen as complements to traditional household surveys by helping to interpret survey results, and aim to capture the experiences of the poor by being more open-ended.

== History ==
Before the 1990s, household-survey approaches were the main way to measure poverty. This shifted to participatory activities in the 1990s after critiques of these traditional methods.

The term "participatory poverty assessment" was coined within the World Bank in 1992, and was seen as a participatory form of poverty assessments (PAs, i.e. survey-based approaches).

Early experiences of PPAs were in sub-Saharan Africa in the early 1990s.

By 1998, 43 PPAs had been conducted: 28 in Africa, 6 in Latin America, 5 in Eastern Europe, and 4 in Asia.

Early PPAs focused most on making higher quality information available to policy makers, rather than seeing the poor as itself being involved in the process of reducing poverty.

Later in the 1990s, "second generation" PPAs appeared, which tried to allow the poor to influence policy decisions.

As of 2012, the World Bank's Voices of the Poor is the largest PPA ever to have been conducted.

== Rationale and comparison to previous methods ==
Both PPAs and traditional surveys contain both quantitative and qualitative information, as well as "subjective" and "objective" parts, so this is not necessarily a distinguishing feature of PPAs. Rather:

Traditional survey data can be used to count, compare, and predict. The strength of the PPA is not in counting but rather in understanding hidden dimensions of poverty and analyzing causality and processes by which people fall into and get out of poverty.

PPAs are also distinguished from anthropological studies because the latter analyze few communities in depth, whereas PPAs analyze various communities of a country. PPAs also focus on policy decisions (which anthropological studies don't need to).

== Types of methodologies and activities ==
Within PPAs, various methodologies exist. Some PPAs use more than one methodology.

- Field work and conducting interviews
- Rapid rural appraisal
- Participatory rural appraisal (includes use of visuals, such as matrices and diagramming)
- SARAR (self-esteem, associative strength, resourcefulness, action planning, and responsibility)
- Beneficiary assessment
- Semistructured interviews and focus groups

PPAs can last from several weeks to several months.

== Organizations using this approach ==
Various organizations have used PPAs as part of their work.

- World Bank
- United Nations Development Programme (UNDP)
- Department for International Development
- ActionAid
- Asian Development Bank
- Danish International Development Agency
- Oxfam UK
- Thailand Development Research Institute

In addition, "secondary stakeholders" (i.e. organizations that do not conduct PPAs directly, but participate in PPAs) such as UNICEF, various NGOs (e.g. Save the Children and Oxfam), academic institutions, etc., have also participated in PPAs.

== Results ==
Participatory poverty assessments confirmed the multidimensional nature of poverty (i.e. that the poor deal not just with lack of money, but with various problems like lack of resources, poor health, physical violence, social isolation, etc.) that was seen from traditional household questionnaire-based methods. PPAs have also been able to access information that was not obtained in household surveys by building trust. For instance PPAs have obtained information on sensitive topics such as child prostitution, drug use, and domestic violence in relation to poverty.

In Zambia, PPAs discovered that the timing of school fees caused economic stress for households, so new legislation to change this timing was proposed.

In Niger, a PPA found that the poor see education only as a seventh priority for poverty reduction due to "the concern that what children learn had little relevance to getting people out of poverty". As a result of this PPA, food security was prioritized.

PPAs have also informed World Bank's World Development Reports.

== See also ==
- Participation (decision making)
- Participatory monitoring
- Participatory action research
- Public participation
