= Moving Out of Poverty =

Moving Out of Poverty is a project sponsored by the World Bank, as well as a series of four books describing the results of the project, that aim to understand how people rise up the ladder from poverty to prosperity, and how they may fall back into poverty. comparative research across more than 500 communities in 15 countries on how and why poor people move out of poverty. The series was launched in 2007 under the editorial direction of Deepa Narayan. Other authors of books in the series include Patti Petesch, Lant Pritchett, and Soumya Kapoor. All the books are freely available online as PDFs in the Open Knowledge Repository.

== Publications ==
=== Books ===
The four books in the series are:

- Volume 1. Cross-Disciplinary Perspectives on Mobility by Deepa Narayan and Patti Petesch, 2007.
- Volume 2. Success from the Bottom Up by Deepa Narayan, Lant Pritchett, and Soumya Kapoor, 2009. This was the most important book of the series.
- Volume 3. The Promise of Empowerment and Democracy in India by Deepa Narayan, 2009.
- Volume 4. Rising from the Ashes of Conflict by Deepa Narayan and Patti Petesch, 2010.

=== Technical notes ===
The World Bank has published detailed technical notes for the project to supplement the qualitative descriptions found in the books.

=== Overviews ===
The World Bank has published a brief overview.

== Key findings ==
According to reviewer Duncan Green, the following were the main findings of the study:

1. Poor people put the poverty line at a level closer to the $2/day threshold for income at purchasing power parity than to the $1/day threshold used in most academic analyses of extreme poverty.
2. The Oscar Lewis view of a culture of poverty is falsified by the study, which shows poor people working hard, optimistic, eager for a better future, and aware of the dangers of bad habits such as drinking and drugs.
3. Poverty is a condition/experience, not a permanent characteristic.
4. Inner strength and confidence that one can move out of poverty is often a first step to a successful transition out of poverty.
5. Poor people face much fewer economic choices than rich people, and this is a major barrier to their getting out of poverty.
6. Microcredit alone does not help most people move out of poverty. However, it can help when combined with good local infrastructure.
7. More responsive local governments lead to better local health and sanitation.
8. Collective action can help poor people cope but does not get them out of poverty because, even pooled together, they do not have much wealth.

== Reception ==
Deepa Narayan wrote an op-ed in The New York Times building on the findings in the study reported in the books.

Duncan Green reviewed the book series on his blog for Oxfam, calling it an outstanding mega-study.

Former United States President Bill Clinton called the series “an important resource for everyone who’s working to alleviate poverty.”

== See also ==
- Voices of the Poor, a 1990s study by the World Bank about the statics of poverty. Moving Out of Poverty distinguished itself from Voices of the Poor in that it focused on the dynamics of moving out of (and falling back into) poverty, and it was a longitudinal study rather than a snapshot in time.
- Disease Control Priorities Project
- Deepa Narayan, Editor, Moving Out of Poverty
