= Voices of the Poor =

World Bank poverty study

Voices of the Poor was an effort in the 1990s through 2000 by the World Bank to collect the experiences of the poor across the world. The name is also used for the reports that were eventually published from the effort. The effort consisted of two parts: primary research using participatory poverty assessment (PPA) in 23 countries, and reviews of existing PPAs and other participatory research. The project was originally called "Consultations with the Poor", but was changed to "Voices of the Poor" in late 1999.

Voices of the Poor also informed the 2000 World Development Report.

== Publications ==
The three volumes of books published as part of the project are:

- Can Anyone Hear Us? (D. Narayan, R. Patel, K. Schafft, A. Rademacher, S. Koch-Shulte, 2000), which looks at 81 participatory poverty assessments carried out by the World Bank during the 1990s, and includes the voices of over 40,000 people in 50 countries;
- Crying Out for Change (D. Narayan, R. Chambers, M. Shah, P. Petesch, 2000), which looks at fieldwork done in 1999 involving over 20,000 people in 23 countries;
- From Many Lands (D. Narayan, P. Petesch, 2002), which includes regional patterns and country case studies from 1999.

== Key findings ==
The key findings of this study include the following:

- Poverty is multidimensional (i.e. the poor deal not just with lack of money, but with various problems like lack of resources, poor health, physical violence, social isolation, etc.).
- NGOs have a limited role in the lives of the poor.

== Reception ==
Writing in 2003, Hiroki Nogami praised Voices of the Poor for its use of qualitative analyses, but noted that the study did not sufficiently take into account how the opinions of the poor change with time and location.

== See also ==
- Moving Out of Poverty
- Disease Control Priorities Project
