= Colin Mathers =

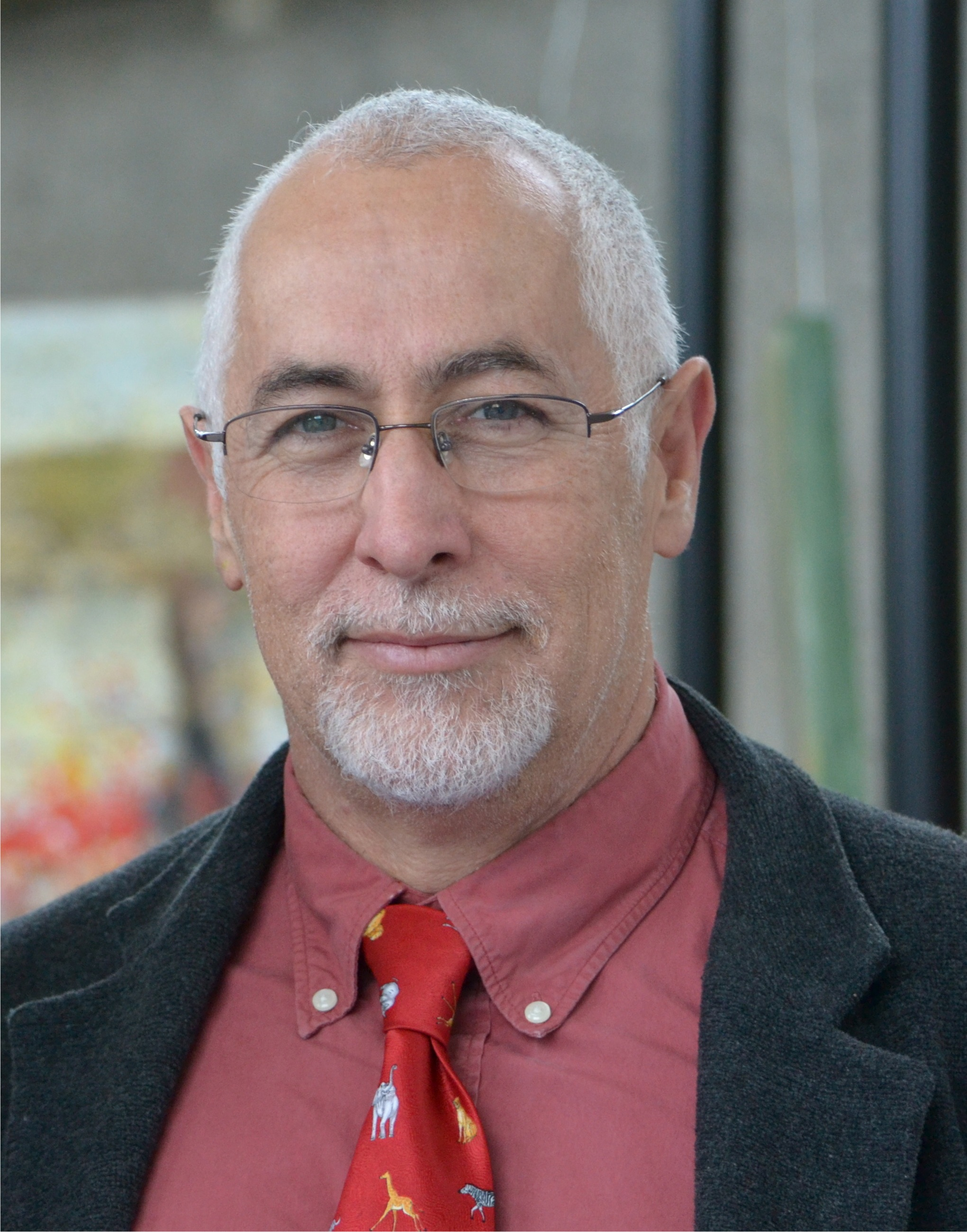
Mathers in 2012

Colin Mathers was coordinator of the Mortality and Burden of Disease Unit in the Health System and Innovation at the World Health Organization (WHO) who specialized in cause of death statistics and projections, burden of disease estimates, and the measurement and reporting of population health and its determinants. He is a co-author on widely cited papers in these areas and a member of the Disease Control Priorities Project. Mathers joined the WHO in 2000 and was previously at the Australian Institute of Health and Welfare. Mathers received his PhD in theoretical physics from the University of Sydney in 1979. He was appointed as Honorary Professor in the College of Medicine & Veterinary Medicine, by the University of Edinburgh in August 2015.
