= Ramanan Laxminarayan =

Economist and epidemiologist

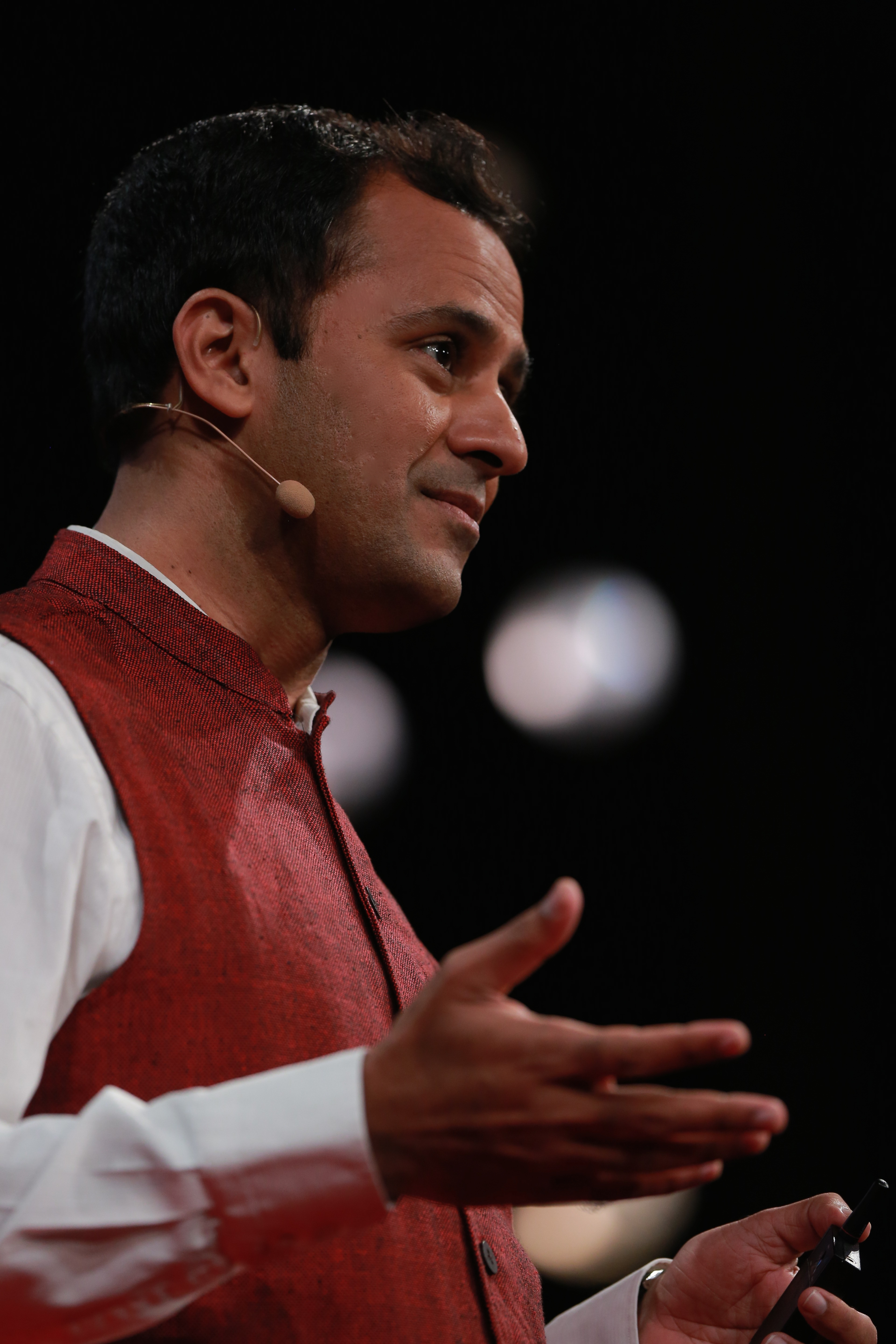
- Born: Kampala, Uganda
- Education: University of Washington Birla Institute of Technology and Science, Pilani
- Scientific career
- Fields: Public health

Ramanan Laxminarayan (born in Kampala, Uganda) is an economist and an epidemiologist. He is founder and director of the One Health Trust – formerly known as the Center for Disease Dynamics, Economics & Policy (CDDEP) – in Washington, D.C., and director of the World Health Organization Collaborating Center for Antimicrobial Resistance. Laxminarayan is a senior research scholar at Princeton University, an affiliate professor at the University of Washington, a senior associate at the Johns Hopkins Bloomberg School of Public Health, and a visiting professor at the University of Strathclyde. In 2023, he was appointed an honorary visiting professor at the National University of Singapore Saw Swee Hock School of Public Health. His research on epidemiological models of infectious diseases and economic analysis of drug resistance, and research on public health gets attention from leaders and policymakers worldwide. He served on the President Obama's Council of Advisors on Science and Technology’s antimicrobial resistance working group. He served as a voting member of the U.S. Presidential Advisory Council on Combating Antimicrobial Resistance from 2015 to 2023. He has served as chairperson of the Global Antibiotic Research and Development Partnership (GARDP), a not-for-profit organization dedicated to developing new antimicrobials, since its founding. GARDP was created by the World Health Organization and the Drugs for Neglected Diseases Initiative (DNDi).

Laxminarayan was a key architect of the Affordable Medicines Facility-malaria (AMFm), an innovative financing mechanism to provide affordable, effective antimalarial drugs worldwide. The idea emerged from an Institute of Medicine panel chaired by economist Kenneth Arrow that called for global subsidies to ensure that artemisinin-based antimalarials were introduced to crowd out monotherapies that would result in resistance. Laxminarayan served on that panel and subsequently worked extensively on the design of the subsidy mechanism. AMFm was launched in 2008 with a commitment from British Prime Minister Gordon Brown.

Laxminarayan is a global expert on antibiotic resistance as a problem of managing a shared global resource. Through his research, public outreach and sustained policy engagement, Laxminarayan played a central role in bringing the issue of drug resistance to the attention of global leaders and policymakers, including to the United Nations General Assembly in September 2016. His TED talk on antibiotic resistance has been viewed more than a million times.

During the Obama administration, Laxminarayan served on the U.S. President's Council of Advisors on Science and Technology's antimicrobial resistance working group. He was subsequently appointed a voting member of the U.S. Presidential Advisory Council on Combating Antimicrobial Resistance in 2016. He was appointed to a second term under the Trump administration. In 2016, he was invited to deliver the John LaMontagne Lecture at NIAID by Dr Anthony Fauci.

Laxminarayan is a member of the Council on Foreign Relations, a fellow of the American Association for Advancement of Science, and a fellow of the Infectious Disease Society of America. He is a series editor of the Disease Control Priorities for Developing Countries, 3rd edition.

== Immunization Technical Support Unit ==
In 2012, Laxminarayan created the Immunization Technical Support Unit (ITSU) that supports the immunization program of the Ministry of Health and Family Welfare of the Government of India and which is credited with helping rapidly improve vaccination coverage and introduction of four new vaccines. The Mission Indradhanush campaign was conceptualized by ITSU and subsequently launched by India's Universal Immunization Programme. Among other innovations, Laxminarayan and his colleagues were instrumental in creating the electronic vaccine intelligence network (eVIN) with pilots in Bareilly and Shahjahanpur. eVIN is now the world's largest electronic vaccine logistics management system and covers all 731 districts across 36 states and union territories in the country.

== Covid in India ==
Laxminarayan was among the earliest in warning about the potential devastation of COVID-19 in India. In a series of interviews in mid-March 2020, when India had fewer than 500 cases and 10 deaths, he predicted that over 200 million Indians would be infected and 1-2 million would die of the disease unless strict measures were put in place. His interview with the BBC, Barkha Dutt and Karan Thapar which warned of a tsunami of Covid cases in India were viewed widely, and were believed to have prompted a widespread lockdown across India by the Indian government. In an oped published in the New York Times following the nationwide lockdown on March 24, 2020, Laxminarayan warned that India only had a few weeks to create an enormous, affordable and easily available testing infrastructure, contain local outbreaks and prepare for the avalanche of the coronavirus. In an interview with Isaac Chotiner of the New Yorker, he predicted that it was "likely that Covid will just rip through the population, unless something fundamentally changes in the virus itself in India, for which we have no real evidence."

He subsequently led the largest study of Covid epidemiology in the world, which was published in Science.

== Oxygen For India ==
During the second Delta wave of COVID-19 in India during March and April 2021, Laxminarayan and a team of volunteers were instrumental in organizing imports of oxygen equipment to solve the challenge of last minute delivery of medical oxygen to patients. The campaign was supported by over 12,000 individual donors and large corporations including United Airlines, Logitech, UIPath, Yahoo and TechMahindra. Laxminarayan's colleague Rahul Thakkar, who had been hospitalized for COVID-19 and for whom Laxminarayan had started the campaign died of the disease in April 2021. OxygenForIndia, a volunteer driven campaign that eventually imported over 20,000 oxygen cylinders and 3,000 oxygen concentrators to alleviate the need for medical oxygen.

Laxminarayan and Dr Indu Bhushan, the founding CEO of Ayushman Bharat together lead OxygenForIndia's work on the formation of a national oxygen grid with the objective that no Indian will die because of lack of medical oxygen anytime, anywhere. Laxminarayan also serves on the Lancet Global Health Commission on Medical Oxygen Security.

== HealthCubed ==
In 2015, Laxminarayan founded HealthCubed, an award-winning start-up to improve access to healthcare and diagnosis for billions of people in both rich and poor countries. The company's flagship product, HealthCube XL, about the size of small dictionary, can carry out over 32 diagnostic tests including ECG, blood pressure, SpO2, hemoglobin, cholesterol, blood glucose and urine analysis, and deliver quality, reliable results within minutes to enable rapid diagnosis. Diagnostic algorithms and applications for patient registration, medical records, payment and referrals, enable patients to get test results that are saved in encrypted format. Currently HealthCubes are deployed across India and Africa and over 1,000,000 patients have already been tested using this technology. HealthCube is regulatory approved in more than 30 countries around the world including in Europe, South Africa, Ghana, Angola and Kenya. HealthCubed was among 16 finalists (selected from 340 entrants) for the Trinity Challenge, which aimed to bring the power of data and analytics to identify, respond to, or recover from disease outbreaks in innovative ways. HealthCubed was named biotech startup of the year by the Government of Karnataka in India for the year 2021, winner of the 2023 GOLD award for Digital Solutions For Rural Healthcare Category by the IHW Council, and a finalist at the 2019 UCSF Digital Health Awards.

== Selected awards and honors ==
One Health Award, L’Istituto Zooprofilattico Sperimentale dell’Abruzzo, Govt of Italy, 2025

Garrod Medal, British Society for Antimicrobial Chemotherapy 2024

Distinguished Alumnus, Academia and Research, Birla Institute of Technology and Science, Pilani, 2019

Distinguished Alumnus, University of Washington, Seattle, 2020

Ella Pringle Keynote Lecture Medal, Royal College of Physicians of Edinburgh 2018

John LaMontagne Memorial Lecture, NIAID, 2016

O’Brien Lecture, University College, Dublin, 2016

Winter Lecture, 2015, University of Edinburgh

BP Koirala Memorial Oration, BP Koirala Institute of Health Sciences, Dharan, 2019
