= Schizophrenia and tobacco smoking =

Interaction between schizophrenia and smoking

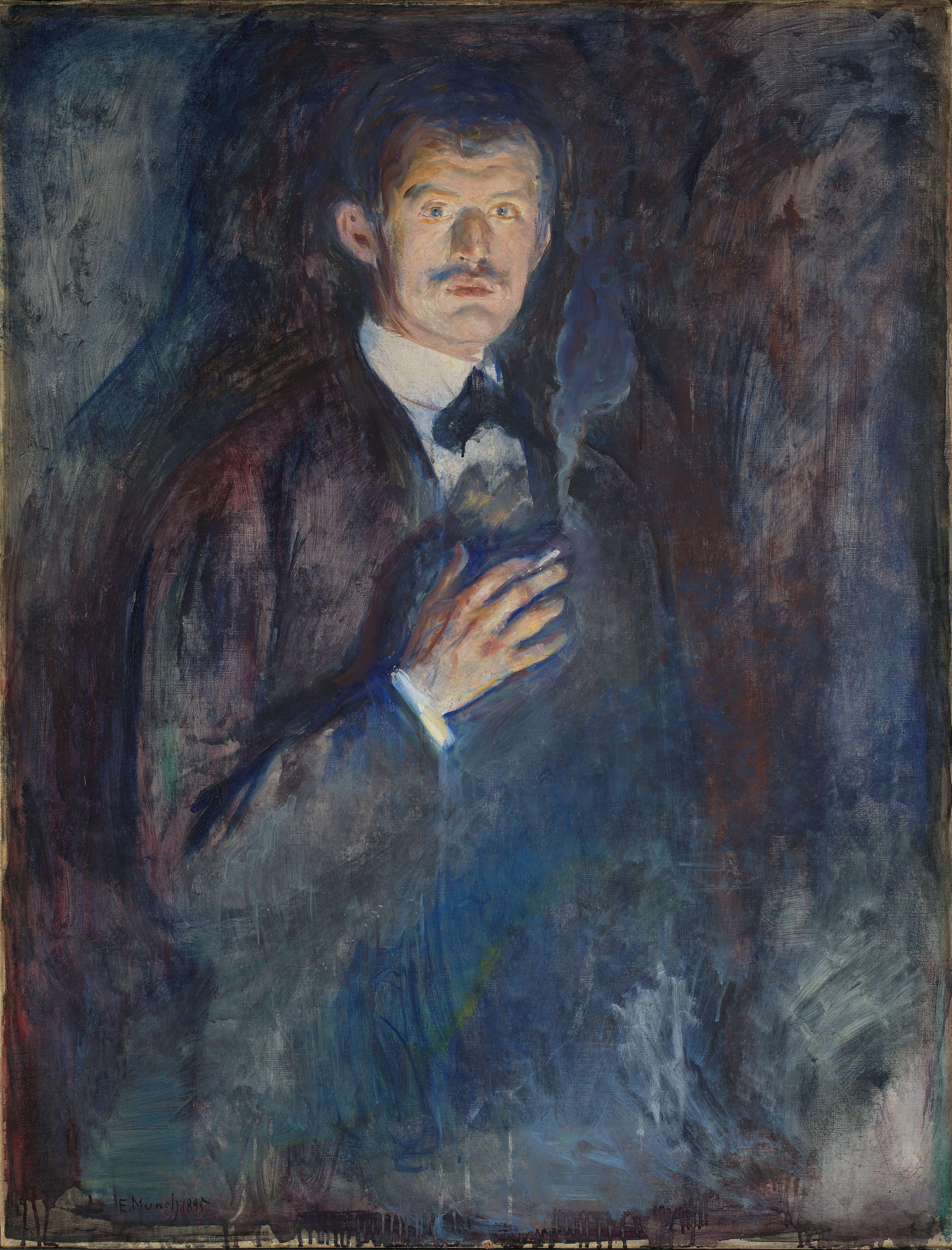
Self-Portrait with Cigarette by Edvard Munch. Munch was posthumously discovered to have schizophrenia by several researchers.

Schizophrenia and tobacco smoking have been historically associated. Smoking is known to harm the health of people with schizophrenia.

Studies across 20 countries showed that people with schizophrenia were much more likely to smoke than those without this diagnosis. For example, in the United States, 90% or more of people with schizophrenia smoked, compared to 20% of the general population in 2006.

It is well established that smoking is more prevalent among people with schizophrenia than the general population as well as those with other psychiatric diagnoses. There is currently no definitive explanation for this difference. Many social, psychological, and biological explanations have been proposed, but today research focuses on neurobiology.

One important reason people smoke cigarettes is due to finding it enjoyable. However, increased rates of smoking among people with schizophrenia have a number of serious impacts, including increased rates of mortality, increased risks of suicidal behavior and cardiovascular disease, reduced treatment effectiveness, and greater financial hardship. Studies have also shown that in a male population, having a schizophrenia spectrum disorder makes it likely for people to use more tobacco. As a result, researchers believe it is important for mental health professionals to combat smoking among people with schizophrenia.

== Causes ==
A number of theories have been proposed to explain increased rates of smoking among people with schizophrenia.

=== Psychological and social theories ===
Several psychological and social explanations have been proposed. The earliest explanations were based on psychoanalytic theory.

The socioeconomic/environmental hypothesis proposed that smoking results because many people with schizophrenia are unemployed and inactive, so smoking relieves boredom. Research has found that this explanation alone cannot account for the extreme amount of smoking among people with schizophrenia.

The personality hypothesis focused on the association between smoking and higher level of neuroticism and anxiety. This hypothesis proposed that anxiety as a symptom of schizophrenia may contribute to smoking.

The psychological tool hypothesis argues that smokers use nicotine to manipulate their mental state in response to various environmental conditions, such as reducing stress and managing negative emotions. Research on this hypothesis notes that people with schizophrenia often cannot cope with problems in constructive ways, so use of smoking as a psychological tool may result in a vicious cycle of more and more smoking.

The self-medication hypothesis argues that people with schizophrenia use nicotine to compensate for the cognitive deficits that result from schizophrenia, the antipsychotic medication used to treat schizophrenia, or both.

The cognitive effects hypothesis suggests that nicotine has positive effects on cognition, so smoking is used to improve neurocognitive dysfunction.

In these hypotheses, one factor often implicated is the effects of institutionalization and boredom. However, people with schizophrenia smoke at higher rates and for longer periods than other groups that experience both institutionalization and boredom.

Another factor often implicated is to the side effects of antipsychotics. Atypical antipsychotics may work against smoking cessation, as symptoms of smoking cessation such as irritable mood, mental dulling, and increased appetite overlap with side effects of atypical antipsychotics. Some also argue that smoking works to reduce the side effects of antipsychotics. However, research shows no association between smoking and antipsychotic use after controlling for schizophrenia.

Another frequently implicated factor is increased mental acuity associated with smoking, important because of the mental dulling found over time in schizophrenia. However, both people with schizophrenia and the general population experience this effect, so it cannot fully explain increased smoking in people with schizophrenia.

A 2003 study of over 50,000 Swedish conscripts found that there was a small but significant protective effect of smoking cigarettes on the risk of developing schizophrenia later in life. Many people with schizophrenia have smoked tobacco products long before they are diagnosed with the illness, and a cohort study of Israeli conscripts found that healthy adolescent smokers were more likely to develop schizophrenia in the future than their nonsmoking peers.

==== Criticisms ====
One major criticism of social and psychological explanations of smoking in schizophrenia is that most studies have failed to include personal perspectives of patients with schizophrenia. Studies including personal perspectives find that people with schizophrenia generally start smoking for the same reasons as the general population, including social pressures and cultural and socioeconomic factors. People with schizophrenia who are current smokers also cite similar reasons for smoking as people without schizophrenia, primarily relaxation, force of habit, and settling nerves. However, 28% cite psychiatric issues, including response to auditory hallucinations and reducing the side effects of medication. The major themes found in studies of personal perspectives are habit and routine, socialization, relaxation, and addiction to nicotine. It is argued that smoking provides structure and activity, both of which may be lacking in the lives of those with serious mental illness.

Another major criticism is based on the finding that the association between smoking and schizophrenia is about as strong across all cultures. This finding implies that the association is not solely social or cultural, but rather has a strong biological component.

=== Biological theories ===
Biological theories focus on the role of dopamine, particularly how negative symptoms such as social withdrawal and apathy may be caused by a deficiency of dopamine in the prefrontal cortex while positive symptoms such as delusions and hallucinations may be caused by excess dopamine in the mesolimbic pathway. Nicotine increases the release of dopamine, so it is hypothesized that smoking helps to correct dopamine deficiency in the prefrontal cortex and thus relieve negative symptoms.

It is unclear, however, how nicotine interacts with positive symptoms, as it would follow from this theory that nicotine would exacerbate excess dopamine in the mesolimbic pathway and thus positive symptoms as well. One theory argues that the beneficial effects of nicotine on negative symptoms outweigh possible exacerbation of positive symptoms. Another theory is based on animal models showing that chronic nicotine use eventually results in a reduction in dopamine, thus alleviating positive symptoms. However, human studies show conflicting results, including some studies that show that smokers with schizophrenia have the most positive symptoms and a reduction in negative symptoms.

Another area of research is the role of nicotinic receptors in schizophrenia and smoking. Studies show increased numbers of exposed nicotinic receptors, which could explain the pathology of both smoking and schizophrenia. However, others argue that the increase in nicotinic receptors is a result of persistent heavy smoking, rather than schizophrenia.

Another source of controversy is the relationship between smoking and sensory gating in schizophrenia. Nicotine may help improve auditory gating, the ability to screen out intrusive environmental sounds. This may help improve attention spans and reduce auditory hallucinations, allowing people with schizophrenia to perceive the environment more effectively and engage in smoother motor functions. However, research shows this effect alone cannot account for increased smoking rates.

== Impacts ==
Increased smoking among people with schizophrenia has a number of impacts on this population. One well-documented consequence is the increase in premature death among people with schizophrenia. Life expectancy among people with schizophrenia is generally 80-85% that of the general population, which results from both unnatural causes such as suicide but also natural causes such as cardiovascular disease, to which smoking is an important contributor. People with schizophrenia have a higher incidence of smoking diseases, with heart disease deaths 30% more likely and respiratory disease deaths 60% more likely. 2/3 of people with schizophrenia die from coronary heart disease, versus less than 1/2 of the general population. Ten-year coronary heart disease risk is significantly elevated in people with schizophrenia, as well as diabetes and hypertension.

Tobacco smoking increases the metabolism of some antipsychotics, by strongly activitating CYP1A2, the enzyme that breaks them down, and a significant difference is found in these levels between smokers and non-smokers. It is recommended that the dosage for those smokers on clozapine be increased by 50%, and for those on olanzapine by 30%. The result of stopping smoking can lead to an increased concentration of the antipsychotic that may result in toxicity, so that monitoring of effects would need to take place with a view to decreasing the dosage; many symptoms may be noticeably worsened, and extreme fatigue, and seizures are also possible with a risk of relapse. Likewise those who resume smoking may need their dosages adjusted accordingly. The altering effects are due to compounds in tobacco smoke and not to nicotine; the use of nicotine replacement therapy therefore has the equivalent effect of stopping smoking and monitoring would still be needed.

Besides biological effects, smoking has a profound social impact on people with schizophrenia. One major impact is financial, as people with schizophrenia have been found to spend a disproportionate amount of their income on cigarettes. A study of people with schizophrenia on public assistance found that they spent a median amount of $142 per month on cigarettes out of a median monthly public assistance income of $596, or about 27.36%. Some argue that this results in further social impacts as people with schizophrenia are then unable to spend money on entertainment and social events that would promote well-being, or may even be unable to afford housing or nutrition.

== Role of tobacco industry ==
Though the relationship between smoking and schizophrenia is well established, a factor to be considered in this relationship is the role of the tobacco industry. Research based on internal industry documents shows a concerted effort by the industry to promote belief that people with schizophrenia need to smoke and that it is dangerous for them to quit. Such promotion includes monitoring or supporting research that endorsed the idea that people with schizophrenia are uniquely immune to the health consequences of smoking (since proved false) and that tobacco is needed for people with schizophrenia to self-medicate. The industry also provided cigarettes to hospital wards and supported efforts to block hospital-based smoking bans. Although this does not discredit the effects of nicotine in schizophrenia, it is argued that the efforts of the tobacco industry slowed the decline in smoking prevalence in people with schizophrenia as well as the development of clinical policies to promote smoking cessation.

== Clinical implications ==
There is evidence that multimodal smoking cessation programs using both pharmacologic therapy (with varenicline or bupropion) and nicotine replacement can be effective without worsening symptoms of schizophrenia. Historically, mental health providers have not attempted to prevent schizophrenics from smoking, based on the rationale that patients with serious mental illness already experience significant stress and disability and as such should be allowed to engage in smoking as an activity that is pleasurable, albeit destructive. There is also historical precedent of mental health providers, particularly in inpatient settings, to use cigarettes as a way to manipulate patient behavior, such as rewarding good behavior with cigarettes or withholding cigarettes to encourage medication compliance. However, research showing that eliminating even one risk factor for disease can significantly improve long-term health outcomes has resulted in the dominant view among clinicians opposing smoking.

Though smoking cessation is generally now a goal of mental health clinicians, there is a lack of empirical research showing successful strategies for accomplishing this goal. However, all studies have shown a reduction in smoking, though not necessarily elimination. Evidence has been found to support the use of sustained-release bupropion, nicotine replacement therapy, atypical antipsychotics, and cognitive-behavioral therapy. Better outcomes are seen when two or more cessation strategies are employed, as well as for patients using atypical antipsychotics rather than typical antipsychotics. There is also no evidence for an increase in positive symptoms or side effects following smoking cessation, while there is evidence for a decrease in negative symptoms.

Besides smoking cessation, the prevalence of smoking among people with schizophrenia also calls for additional measures in evaluation by mental health providers. Researchers argue that providers should incorporate tobacco use assessment into everyday clinical practice, as well as continuing assessments of cardiovascular health through measures such as blood pressure and diagnostics such as electrocardiography. Additionally there are ethical and practical concerns if healthcare facilities prohibit smoking without providing alternatives, particularly since withdrawal can alter the presentation of symptoms and response to treatment and may confuse or even exacerbate symptoms. Clinicians should also be aware of the consequences that can result from a lack of cigarettes, such as aggression, prostitution, trafficking, and general disruption. These consequences indicate that providers may need to help patients obtain cigarettes and/or monitor usage.

Experimental drugs that agonize the α7 nicotinic acetylcholine receptors targeted by nicotine such as GTS-21 have been suggested as candidates for symptomatic treatment of schizophrenia.
