= Dean Jamison =

American economist and global health scholar

Dean T. Jamison
- Born: c. 1943 (age 82–83)

Academic background
- Education: Stanford University, Harvard University, Harvard School of Public Health
- Influences: Kenneth Arrow

Academic work
- Discipline: Health economics, Education Economics
- Institutions: University of California, San Francisco, University of Washington in Seattle
- Awards: Member of the Institute of Medicine of the U.S. National Academy of Sciences
- Website: dcp-3.org/editor/dean-jamison; Information at IDEAS / RePEc

Dean Tecumseh Jamison (born c. 1943) is an American economist and leader in the study of global health. He is currently Senior Fellow in Global Health Sciences at University of California, San Francisco and an Emeritus Professor of Global Health at the University of Washington in Seattle. He has published in health economics, global health, education economics, and decision theory.

== Early life ==
Jamison was born in about 1943 and moved often as a child as his father was a pilot in the US Air Force. As a child he loved mathematics and studied engineering at Stanford University before turning to economics at Harvard. He received his undergraduate and master's degrees from Stanford University and a Ph.D. in economics from Harvard University under Kenneth Arrow. His sister is psychologist Kay Redfield Jamison, his daughter is the author Leslie Jamison, and his son, Julian Jamison, is also an economist.

== Education ==
- PhD - Economics, Harvard University, 1970
- MS - Engineering, Stanford University, 1967
- AB - Philosophy, Stanford University, 1966

== Career ==
After graduating, Jamison worked at Educational Testing Service where he did research on economics and education, as well as on the impact of educational technology. In 1976, he moved on to the World Bank, where he was employed until 1988. His early work at the bank was as an education economist. When China joined the World Bank in 1978 Jamison was assigned to analyse China's progress in health and nutrition. He then spent time heading up the bank's health work in China. During that time, he also served as director of the World Development Report Office and was lead author of the "World Development Report 1993: Investing in Health." Also, at the WHO, he was lead author of the "World Health Report 1999."

His first job in academia was as professor of education and public health at the University of California, Los Angeles from 1988 to 2006, at first while on extended leave from the bank. In the early 2010s, He was a professor of global health at the University of Washington in Seattle and worked as a co-PI at the Institute for Health Metrics and Evaluation (IHME). and is currently at the University of California, San Francisco. He has also held positions at Harvard, Harvard School of Public Health, Peking University and the University of Queensland. He has also worked at the National Institute of Health, and the World Health Organization. In 1994, he was elected to the Institute of Medicine of the U.S. National Academy of Sciences. He has been involved in a wide range of professional activities and served as Co-Chair and Study Director of the Lancet Commission on Investing in Health which published their results in 2013.

He currently is co-leader of the Disease Control Priorities Project, and was lead author of the Disease Control Priorities in Developing Countries, the first edition of which was published in 1993, the second edition, titled Global Burden of Disease and Risk Factors, in 2006. The project is currently working on the third edition. In 2013, Jamison and Lawrence Summers developed the Global Health: 2035 report that considered the economic benefit of mortality reduction using approaches derived from economic theory.
