= One Health Trust =

Public health research organization

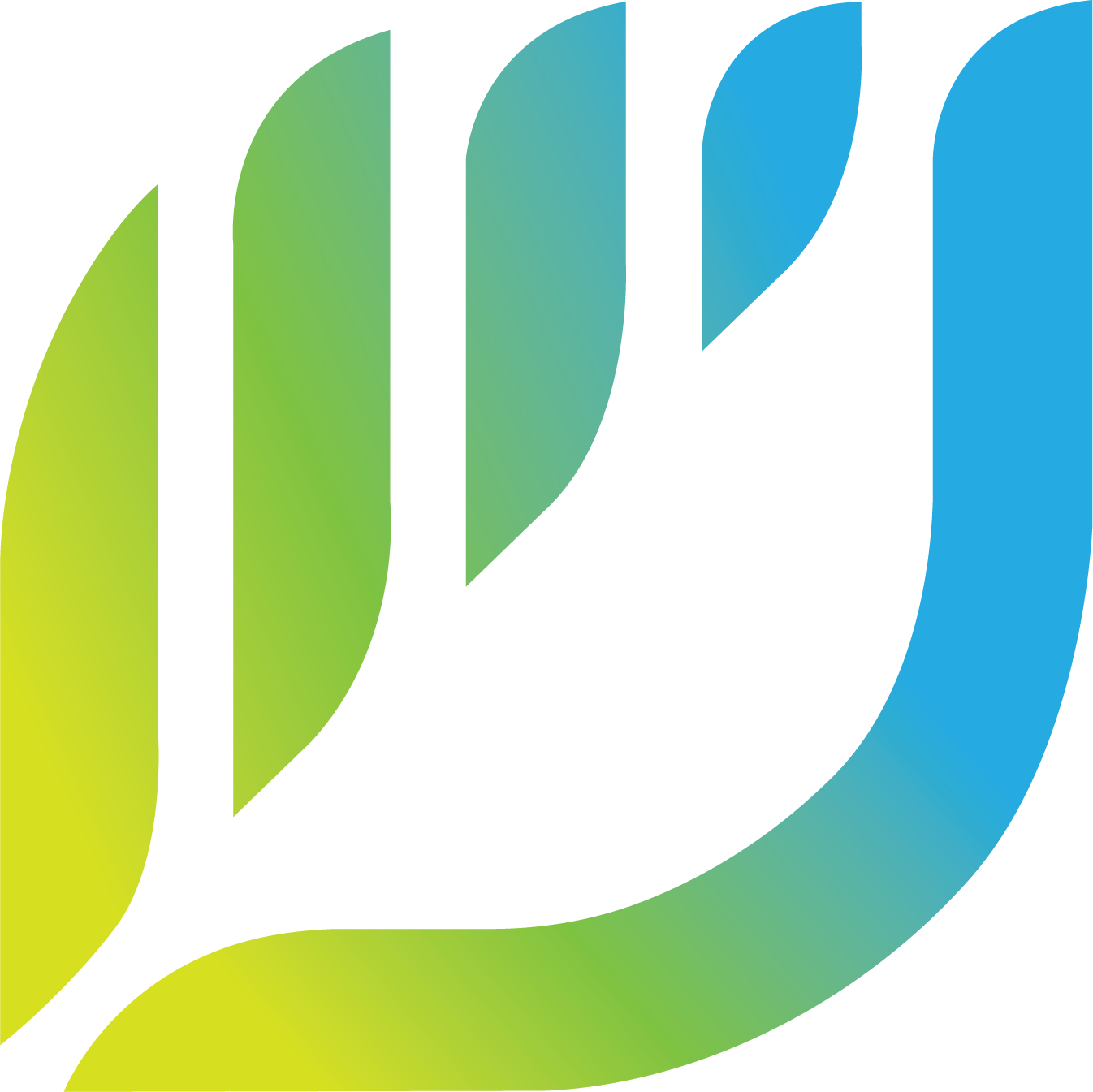
- Formation: 2009
- Headquarters: 5636 Connecticut Avenue NW, PO Box 42735, Washington, D.C. 20015, U.S.A.
- Location: Washington, D.C.
- Founder & President: Ramanan Laxminarayan
- Website: onehealthtrust.org

The One Health Trust (OHT), originally founded as the Center for Disease Dynamics, Economics & Policy (CDDEP) in 2010, is a nonprofit global health think tank with offices in Washington, D.C., United States, and Bangalore, India.

The organization announced its transition from CDDEP to the One Health Trust in 2022. The One Health Trust’s research covers topics related to the One Health approach, including antimicrobial resistance, zoonotic and vector-borne diseases, environmental health, the social determinants of health, animal health, pollution, vaccination, sustainable food systems, and climate change.

The organization was founded by Dr. Ramanan Laxminarayan, who serves as its president.

== Overview ==
The One Health Trust has a multidisciplinary research team of economists, epidemiologists, social scientists, microbiologists, veterinarians, medical doctors, and disease modelers.

== WHO Collaborating Centre for Antimicrobial Resistance ==
The One Health Trust, acting as CDDEP, became a World Health Organization (WHO) Collaborating Centre for antimicrobial resistance in 2020. Its researchers have supported the WHO in preparing country-specific policy and information briefs assessing progress in implementing national action plans on antimicrobial resistance.

== Antimicrobial resistance research in Africa ==
As part of the Mapping Antimicrobial Resistance and Antimicrobial Use Partnership (MAAP) consortium, the One Health Trust contributed to the collection and analysis of antimicrobial resistance data in Africa. The consortium included the African Society for Laboratory Medicine, the Africa Centres for Disease Control and Prevention, the West African Health Organization, the East, Central and Southern Africa Health Community, IQVIA, and Innovative Support to Emergencies, Diseases and Disasters.

The project was funded by the Fleming Fund. It involved collecting antimicrobial resistance data from public and private laboratories and pharmacies across Africa. According to the project reports, the consortium reviewed 819,584 antimicrobial resistance records collected between 2016 and 2019 from 205 laboratories in 14 African Union member states.

== Research and initiatives ==
=== Current initiatives ===
==== ResistanceMap ====
Launched in 2010, ResistanceMap is a collection of tools developed by the One Health Trust that presents national and subnational data on antimicrobial use and resistance.

In 2015, ResistanceMap was updated with a redesigned interface, additional tools, and antimicrobial use and resistance data from several low- and middle-income countries in Africa, Asia, and South America.

==== One World, One Health podcast ====
The One World, One Health podcast was launched in 2022. Hosted by Maggie Fox, the interview-based podcast features discussions with researchers about One Health topics including pandemics, antimicrobial resistance, zoonotic and vector-borne diseases, climate change, deforestation, and pollution.

==== OxygenForIndia initiative ====
The OxygenForIndia initiative was launched by the One Health Trust and partner organizations to address shortages of medical oxygen in India during the COVID-19 pandemic.

In April 2021, during a medical oxygen shortage in India, the initiative deployed 20,000 reusable oxygen cylinders and 3,000 oxygen concentrators to 57 urban and rural centers in India. Subsequent reporting described efforts to strengthen medical oxygen supply systems and improve health system preparedness.

Following the immediate response to the pandemic-related oxygen shortage, OxygenForIndia expanded its work toward establishing a stable medical oxygen supply system in India. OHT researchers and collaborators are working on rolling out a National Medical Oxygen Grid (NMOG), a monitoring and coordination platform intended to track medical oxygen demand and supply and support data-based decision-making. The initiative is intended to improve access to medical oxygen during emergencies as well as in non-pandemic settings.

=== Global Antibiotic Resistance Partnership ===
The One Health Trust manages and is a technical partner in the Global Antibiotic Resistance Partnership (GARP), which was established in 2008 to support the development of country-led strategies and policies addressing antimicrobial resistance in low- and middle-income countries in Asia and Africa. The partnership received funding from the Gates Foundation. The One Health Trust is currently working with GARP country experts to identify opportunities to leverage vaccines to help address antimicrobial resistance (AMR) in local contexts.

=== Climate Research ===
One Health Trust researchers collaborate in studies related to climate change, health, and sustainable food systems.

=== Research on Access to Effective Antibiotics ===
One Health Trust research has covered antimicrobial resistance since it was founded. OHT research covers different issues related to AMR including AMR burden, AMR control strategies, and how different population groups are more vulnerable to drug-resistant infections.

One Health Trust also conducts research to look at the impact of the lack of access to antibiotics for people when they need them, particularly in low resource settings.

The One Health Trust's founder, Dr. Ramanan Laxminarayan, spoke at the United Nations General Assembly High-level Meeting on Antimicrobial Resistance in 2024. Citing the 2024 Lancet Series on Antimicrobial Resistance, he said that more people in the world die from a lack of access to antibiotics when they need them than from antimicrobial resistance, especially in low- and middle-income countries. He called for research, funding, and awareness to improve access to the antibiotics that are still working when people need them as part of the effort to control antimicrobial resistance.

=== Research on Livestock Vaccination ===
Researchers from the One Health Trust publish on the impact of livestock vaccination and how to improve use of livestock vaccination in different parts of the world to protect human health, the environment, the climate, and food safety and security.

== Past Initiatives ==
=== Modeling Infectious Diseases in Healthcare Network ===
The One Health Trust was a member of the Modeling Infectious Diseases in Healthcare Network (MInD–Healthcare), a network supported by the U.S. Centers for Disease Control and Prevention. The network conducted transmission modeling research on healthcare-associated infections and antibiotic-resistant infections and assessed the potential effects of preventive measures.

=== The Affordable Medicines Facility–Malaria ===
The Affordable Medicines Facility–Malaria was developed from a 2004 Institute of Medicine report co-authored by Ramanan Laxminarayan, president of the One Health Trust. The initiative sought to address resistance to commonly used antimalarial medicines by improving access to artemisinin-based combination therapies through private pharmacies and retail outlets.

The program used bulk purchasing and subsidies to expand access to artemisinin-based combination therapies and reduce their prices in rural areas of Africa.
