= Jameel Institute =

Research institute at Imperial College London

Coordinates: 51.518°N 0.173°W

- Established: 2019
- Field of research: Mathematical modelling of disease and emergencies
- Director: Neil Ferguson
- Faculty: Kalipso Chalkidou; Majid Ezzati; Edward Gregg; Timothy Hallett; Katharina Hauck; Helen Ward
- Campus: White City
- Affiliations: Imperial College Faculty of Medicine; Imperial College COVID-19 Response Team
- Website: imperial.ac.uk/jameel-institute

The Abdul Latif Jameel Institute for Disease and Emergency Analytics (commonly, the Jameel Institute) is a research institute at Imperial College London in the fields of epidemiology, mathematical modelling of infectious diseases and emergencies, environmental health, and health economics. Co-founded in 2019 by Imperial College London and Community Jameel, the Jameel Institute is housed in the School of Public Health, within the college's Faculty of Medicine. The mission of the Jameel Institute is "to combat threats from disease worldwide".

The Jameel Institute rose to prominence in 2020 under the leadership of Professor Neil Ferguson, Director of the Jameel Institute, when, as part of the Imperial College COVID-19 Response Team, the Jameel Institute published mathematical modelling of the COVID-19 pandemic. As part of the COVID-19 pandemic response, researchers from the Jameel Institute provided expert advice to the UK government's Scientific Pandemic Influenza Group on Modelling, Operational sub-group (SPI-M-O). In 2022, SPI-M-O was awarded the Weldon Memorial Prize, which is awarded annually by the University of Oxford for "noteworthy contributions to the development of mathematical or statistical methods applied to problems in Biology".

== History ==
In October 2019, the Jameel Institute was co-founded by Imperial and Community Jameel. The Jameel Institute was launched at a signing ceremony on Imperial's White City campus, with Imperial's president, Alice Gast, and Fady Jameel and Hassan Jameel, presidents of Community Jameel.

=== COVID-19 pandemic ===
In 2020, from the outbreak of COVID-19 pandemic, the Jameel Institute began publishing regular reports with results of mathematical modelling of the spread of the virus. The Jameel Institute and other research centers in Imperial involved in the modelling were later grouped into the Imperial College COVID-19 Response Team. As of November 2020, the team had published 36 reports.

==== Report 9 ====
On 16 March 2020, the Jameel Institute—together with the World Health Organization Collaborating Centre for Infectious Disease Modelling and the MRC Centre for Global Infectious Disease Analysis (MRC GIDA)—published "Report 9: Impact of non-pharmaceutical interventions (NPIs) to reduce COVID-19 mortality and healthcare demand", with a focus on the UK and the US.

The report found:

Two fundamental strategies are possible: (a) mitigation, which focuses on slowing but not necessarily stopping epidemic spread – reducing peak healthcare demand while protecting those most at risk of severe disease from infection, and (b) suppression, which aims to reverse epidemic growth, reducing case numbers to low levels and maintaining that situation indefinitely. Each policy has major challenges. We find that that optimal mitigation policies (combining home isolation of suspect cases, home quarantine of those living in the same household as suspect cases, and social distancing of the elderly and others at most risk of severe disease) might reduce peak healthcare demand by 2/3 and deaths by half. However, the resulting mitigated epidemic would still likely result in hundreds of thousands of deaths and health systems (most notably intensive care units) being overwhelmed many times over. For countries able to achieve it, this leaves suppression as the preferred policy option. We show that in the UK and US context, suppression will minimally require a combination of social distancing of the entire population, home isolation of cases and household quarantine of their family members. This may need to be supplemented by school and university closures, though it should be recognised that such closures may have negative impacts on health systems due to increased absenteeism. The major challenge of suppression is that this type of intensive intervention package – or something equivalently effective at reducing transmission – will need to be maintained until a vaccine becomes available (potentially 18 months or more) – given that we predict that transmission will quickly rebound if interventions are relaxed. We show that intermittent social distancing – triggered by trends in disease surveillance – may allow interventions to be relaxed temporarily in relative short time windows, but measures will need to be reintroduced if or when case numbers rebound.

The report led to changes in policy by the UK and US governments, including more stringent social distancing, quarantine, and other preventative measures, as well as informing policy in other countries worldwide.

==== Coursera ====
To provide education about the pandemic, the Jameel Institute launched a free massive open online course on Coursera called "Science Matters: Let's Talk About COVID-19". The most popular course launched on Coursera in 2020, the Jameel Institute had over 130,000 enrolled learners that year. The course was presented by Jameel Institute research lead Professor Helen Ward and deputy director Dr Katharina Hauck, with specific modules in collaboration with other researchers from across Imperial.

=== Jameel Institute symposium ===
The inaugural symposium, marking the Jameel Institute's first anniversary, took place on 24 November 2020, featuring Dame Sally Davies, former chief medical officer for England, and Professor Esther Duflo, Nobel Prize laureate and co-founder of the Abdul Latif Jameel Poverty Action Lab (J-PAL). Prior to the symposium, the Jameel Institute published a recorded discussion between Neil Ferguson, Director of the Jameel Institute, and Tony Blair, former prime minister of the United Kingdom, on the subject of the symposium.

== Faculty and leadership ==
The director of the Jameel Institute since its founding is Professor Neil Ferguson, professor of mathematical biology at Imperial.

The Jameel Institute has six research leads:

- Professor Kalipso Chalkidou, director of global health policy at the Center for Global Development, and director of International Decision Support Initiative
- Professor Majid Ezzati, chair in global environmental health
- Professor Edward Gregg, chair in diabetes and cardiovascular disease epidemiology
- Professor Timothy Hallett, professor of global health
- Dr Katharina Hauck, deputy director of the Jameel Institute and reader in health economics
- Professor Helen Ward, professor of public health
