= Faculty of Medicine, Imperial College London =

Faculty of medicine in London, England

Coordinates: 51°29′52″N 0°10′35″W

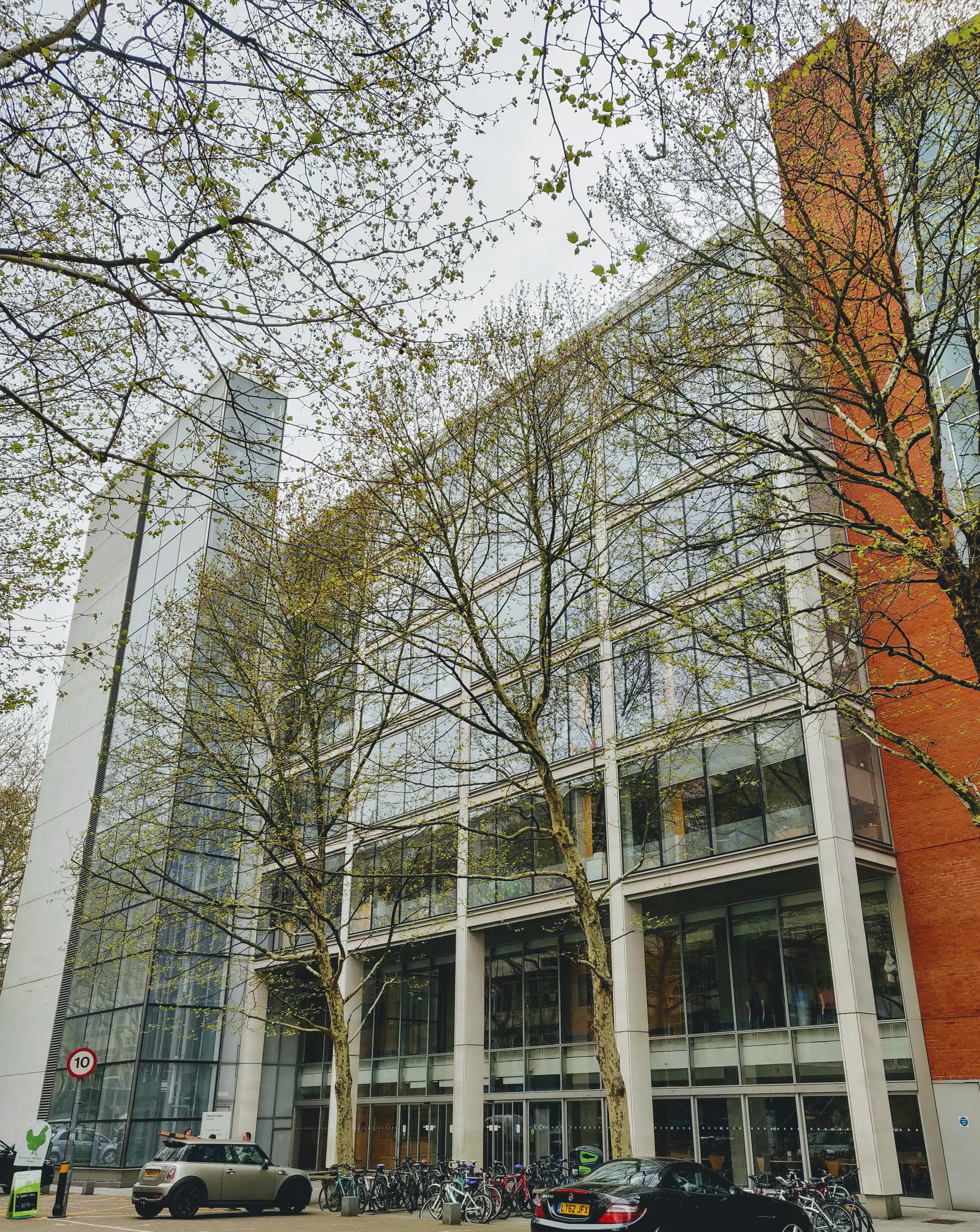
- Sir Alexander Fleming Building
- Former name: Imperial College School of Medicine
- Established: 2001
- Dean: Jonathan Weber
- Academic staff: 450
- Administrative staff: 1,114
- Undergraduates: 2,188
- Postgraduates: 1,927
- Location: London, United Kingdom
- Campus: South Kensington, Hammersmith, Chelsea and Westminster, St Mary's, Charing Cross, Royal Brompton
Colours
- Website: www.imperial.ac.uk/medicine

The Faculty of Medicine is the academic centre for medical and clinical research and teaching at Imperial College London. It contains the Imperial College School of Medicine, which is the college's undergraduate medical school.

== History ==
Medical teaching at Imperial dates back to the founding of Charing Cross Hospital Medical School in 1823, which was followed by other medical schools including Chelsea and Westminster Hospital Medical School, St Mary's Hospital Medical School, and the Royal Postgraduate Medical School. These preceding medical schools were home to numerous medical researchers, including Sir Alexander Fleming, who discovered penicillin whilst working at St Mary's. St Mary's became part of Imperial in 1988, with the rest merging to form Imperial College School of Medicine in 1995. To accommodate medical activities at South Kensington, the Sir Alexander Fleming building was opened in October 1998, designed by Foster + Partners and costing £65 million.

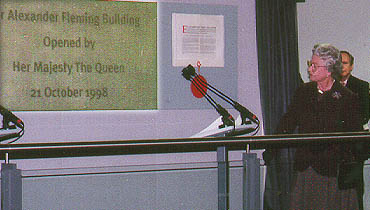
Queen Elizabeth II opening the Sir Alexander Fleming Building

The Faculty of Medicine was created as part of a college-wide restructuring announced in 2001, taking over research responsibilities from the School of Medicine, which in turn was restricted to only teaching the undergraduate course. The faculty has since had input on biomaterials and bioengineering courses across the college, and been reorganised into 8 academic departments.

In early 2020, immunology research focused on finding a vaccine against SARS-CoV-2 as part of the inter-departmental COVID-19 Response Team, led by the faculty. Under the leadership of professor Robin Shattock, the team made a significant breakthrough by reducing a part of the normal development time to develop the vaccine from "two to three years to just 14 days." By February 2020 the research team was at the stage of testing the vaccine on animals. The faculty's 16 March 2020 report entitled "Impact of non-pharmaceutical interventions (NPIs) to reduce COVID-19 mortality and healthcare demand" was described in a March 17 The New York Times article, as the coronavirus "report that jarred the U.S. and the U.K. to action".

== Campuses ==
The medical school is based at the Sir Alexander Fleming Building on Imperial College Road in South Kensington. It also has many hospital campuses across London with teaching, research and library facilities:

- Hammersmith Hospital
- St Mary's Hospital
- Charing Cross Hospital
- Royal Brompton Hospital
- Chelsea and Westminster Hospital

The faculty also has a presence at its many other associated hospitals across London.

== Academics ==
The faculty is closely linked to the National Health Service, and organises research and clinical teaching through its Imperial College Healthcare NHS Trust hospitals, which is among the largest in the country, and other affiliated hospitals around London. It has also conducted studies on strategies for improving medical teaching and student preparation. The faculty is home to many research institutes, including the Partnership for Child Development and the London Institute of Medical Sciences, which is also a Medical Research Council institute. It is also one of the founding institutions of the Francis Crick Institute, an inter-university medical research centre in London, and the largest biomedical laboratory in Europe.

=== Department of Brain Sciences ===
The Department of Brain Sciences is the centre of research and teaching in neuroscience and mental health at Imperial College London. It is one of eight academic departments within the College's Faculty of Medicine and was established following a Faculty reorganisation in 2019. The department also comprises the Centre for Psychedelic Research and leads the UK DRI Centre at Imperial and the UK DRI Care Research & Technology Centre. The department is led by Professor Paul M. Matthews and is centred at Imperial's Hammersmith Campus, with research groups also based at the White City and Charing Cross Campuses.

The department hosts the Multiple Sclerosis and Parkinson's Tissue Bank, a national collection of central nervous system tissue samples donated by individuals with multiple sclerosis (MS), Parkinson's disease and related conditions. The facility is funded by the Multiple Sclerosis Society and Parkinson's UK.

In 2019-20, the department's academic expenditure was £20.8 million, with a research income of £17.7 million.

It comprises three main research Divisions - Neurology, Neuroscience and Psychiatry - in addition to the Centre for Psychedelic Research, the world's first official centre for psychedelic research, led by Professor David Nutt. The department leads two UK Dementia Research Institute (DRI) centres: the UK DRI Centre at Imperial, directed by Professor Paul M. Matthews, and the UK DRI Care Research & Technology Centre, directed by Professor David Sharp in partnership with the University of Surrey.

The department also hosts the Imperial College Brain Tumour Research Centre of Excellence, led by Dr Nelofer Syed.

In the 2021 Research Excellence Framework (REF), Imperial College London was ranked first for psychology, psychiatry and neuroscience.

=== School of Public Health ===
The School of Public Health is the faculty's research centre for epidemiology and public health, and includes the Jameel Institute for Disease and Emergency Analytics (established with support from Community Jameel, and led by Neil Ferguson), and the Medical Research Council's Centre for Global Infectious Disease Analysis. The school also offers postgraduate and intercalated undergraduate courses. As of 2019, the school is to move to premises at the college's new White City campus once construction is complete.

=== Medical school ===
The faculty offers a 6-year MBBS course through its School of Medicine, which includes an intercalated year leading to a BSc. The school also offers intercalated programmes for external students, and has partnered with Nanyang Technological University in Singapore to run its Lee Kong Chian School of Medicine, for which it has developed the medical curriculum.

=== National Heart and Lung Institute ===
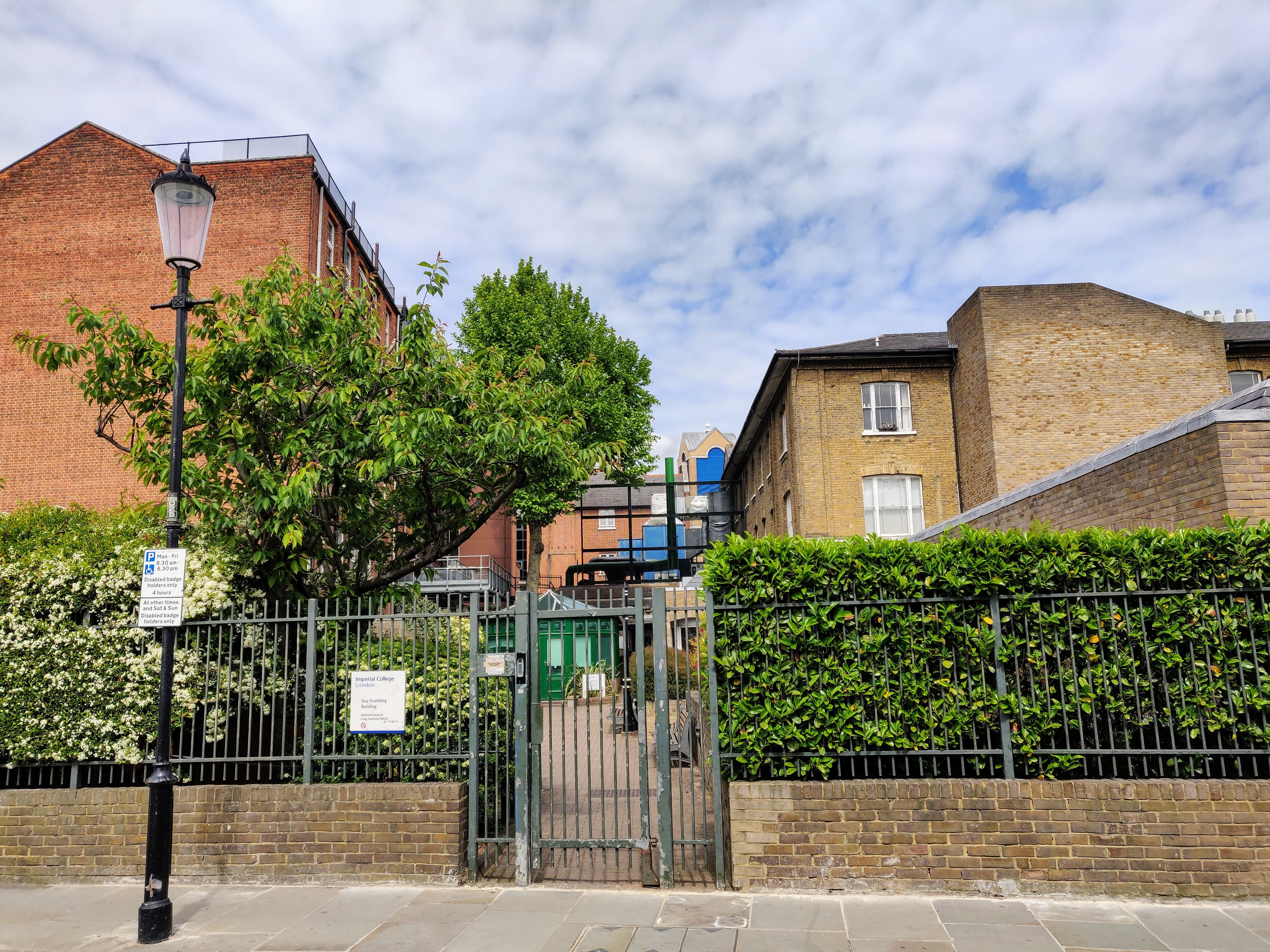
National Heart and Lung Institute, Guy Scadding Building

Based across multiple Imperial College campuses, but primarily at the Hammersmith Hospital Campus, the National Heart and Lung Institute had been part of the British Postgraduate Medical Federation, within the University of London. The National Heart and Lung Institute was the highest ranked of Imperial's medical departments in Research Excellence Framework (REF) 2014. It eventually joined Imperial in 1995, becoming part of the then School of Medicine two years thereafter.

=== Rankings ===
The faculty ranks 3rd in the world for Clinical and Health in the 2022 Times Higher Education rankings. Tied 11th (with UCSF) in the QS World University Rankings 2018. It is ranked 3rd for medicine in the 2018 Complete University Guide rankings, 11th in the UK by the Guardian University Guide 2018, and 2nd in the UK for research in the latest RAE in 2008, behind Edinburgh.

== See also ==
- Imperial College Healthcare NHS Trust
- United Hospitals
