= COVID-19 pandemic in South Carolina =

Ongoing COVID-19 viral pandemic in South Carolina, United States

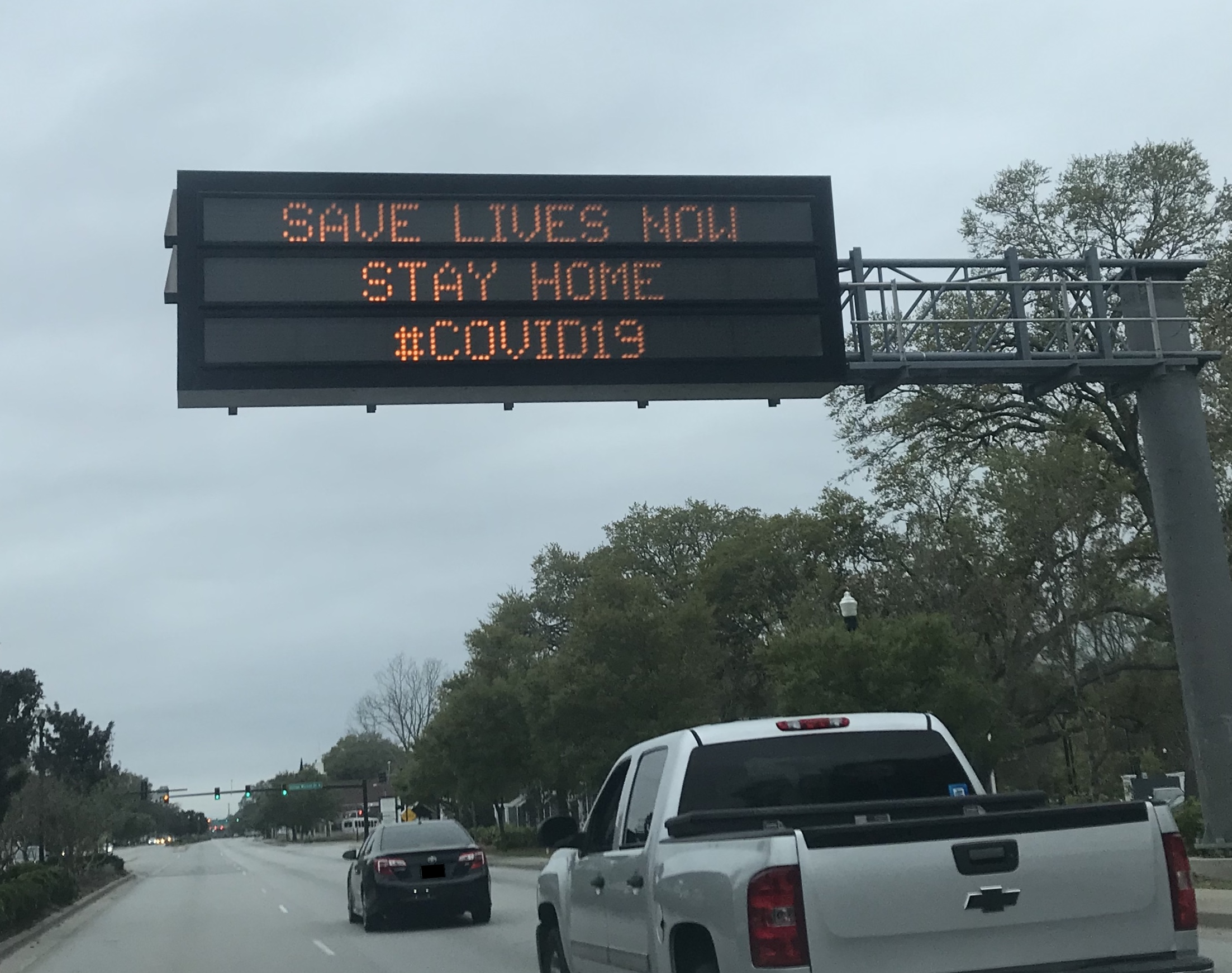
- Warning sign in Mount Pleasant, March 2020
- Disease: COVID-19
- Pathogen: SARS-CoV-2
- Location: South Carolina
- First outbreak: Wuhan, Hubei, China
- Index case: March 7, 2020; Charleston and Kershaw counties
- Confirmed cases: 1,605,165
- Suspected cases: 314,702
- Hospitalized cases: 20,725 (total)
- Deaths: 18,192

Government website
- www.scdhec.gov/covid19

The COVID-19 pandemic was confirmed to have reached the U.S. state of South Carolina in March 2020. On April 2, 2020, DHEC announced that the virus had spread to all 46 counties in the state. During the month of June the seven-day moving average of new COVID-19 cases in South Carolina increased nearly five-fold, from 293 on June 1 to 1,398 on June 30, and continued to increase during July and into August. As of August 2022 the South Carolina Department of Health and Environmental Control (DHEC) has confirmed 1,605,165 cases in the state and 18,192 deaths.

As of August 2022 69.2% of the residents age 12 or older have received at least one dose of the vaccine, 59% have completed the vaccine series.

== Timeline ==
=== 2020 ===
==== March ====
- March 6: DHEC announced that two women, one from Charleston County and one from Kershaw County, were under investigation and are presumed to have South Carolina's first cases of COVID-19. Tests for the two women returned the next day as "presumptive-positive," giving South Carolina its first two cases. The two cases were not linked, and one of them involved a patient who had recently traveled to Italy and France.
- March 12: The South Carolina Independent School Association (SCISA) announced that it would suspend all athletics until April 3. The South Carolina Science Olympiad canceled its state championship tournaments scheduled for March 14 and 21.
- March 13: Governor Henry McMaster declares a state of emergency and orders the closure of all public schools in Kershaw and Lancaster counties for 14 days.
- March 15: Governor McMaster and other officials announce the closure of all public schools in the state until March 31.
- March 16:
  - A nursing home patient in Lexington County is reported as the first COVID-19 related death in South Carolina.
  - The South Carolina High School League (SCHSL) suspends all spring sports until April 5.
- March 17: Governor McMaster issues an executive order requiring the mandatory shutdown of dine-in service in restaurants and bars. The order also includes the delay of state tax deadlines until June 1, the general request of state agencies to waive any restrictive regulations in order to move faster to address the virus, and also prohibits gatherings of more than 50 people at publicly owned facilities.
- March 19: The Governor issues an additional executive order, ordering non-essential state employees to stay home, emergency measures for unemployment claims and benefits, among other orders, including calling for all public colleges and universities in the state to finish their semesters online.
- March 20: Two deaths are reported, one in Florence County and one in Charleston County, bringing the total for the state to three. Both persons were reported as being elderly and having underlying health conditions.
- March 21: The Governor says that a shelter in place is "not under consideration" at the time, after rumors to the contrary and similar action being taken by other states. McMaster also orders local law enforcement to disperse crowds gathered on state beaches.
- March 23:
  - DHEC reports two additional deaths, one from Kershaw County (later reclassified to Sumter County) and one from Clarendon County, bringing South Carolina's total to five. Both persons had underlying health conditions.
  - Governor McMaster holds a briefing in which he instructs law enforcement to disperse any public gathering of three or more people, with violations of this rule resulting in a misdemeanor.
- March 24:
  - Governor McMaster and State Superintendent of Education Molly Spearman announce that public schools statewide, including colleges and universities, will remain closed through the end of April.
  - The sixth and seventh coronavirus-related deaths are reported by DHEC. One of these was the second death reported from Florence County; this person was reported to have underlying health problems. The other death was reported from Horry County; this person did not have any reported underlying health problems. Additionally, DHEC reported that an individual whose death was originally attributed to Kershaw County actually resided in Sumter County.
- March 25: The death of Jack West, the son of former Governor John C. West, is reported as the eighth in South Carolina and the first from Kershaw County.
- March 27:
  - It is announced that state parks will be closed through the end of April.
  - President Donald Trump approves South Carolina's disaster declaration.

==== April ====
- April 1: The Governor orders all non-essential businesses closed temporarily.
- April 3:
  - The Governor issues two additional executive orders, one ordering the closure of additional non-essential businesses, and the other enforcing lodging and travel restrictions from people traveling from high-risk areas (New York, New Jersey, and Connecticut).
  - Data of confirmed cases by zip code is first released.
  - DHEC releases data of total persons tested by DHEC Public Health Laboratory and, for the first time, data from private laboratories.
- April 6: Governor McMaster issues a statewide "home or work" order, effective April 7 at 5 p.m. Individuals are permitted to commute to home or to work (for those who cannot work from home), as well as for "essential activities" or to access "essential services". Social distancing guidelines are to be followed at all times. Those in violation would be charged with a misdemeanor and required to serve 30 days in jail and/or pay a $100 fine for each day they are in violation. Retail businesses are required to have no more than 5 customers for every 1,000 square feet of space. All non-essential businesses have been ordered to close.
- April 19: The Governor announces plans to allow retail stores statewide to reopen on April 21. The Post and Courier reported that "occupancy in each store will be limited to five customers per 1,000 square feet of retail space or 20% occupancy, whichever is less" and "local governments will still be allowed to make their own rules about waterway access." However, the stay-at-home order will remain in place.
- April 22: Governor McMaster and Superintendent Spearman announce the closure of schools in South Carolina for the remainder of the school year.

==== May ====
- May 4: Governor McMaster lifts the "home or work" order and announces that restaurants are allowed to begin offering outdoor dining in addition to takeout, delivery, and curbside services.
- May 8: Governor McMaster reopens public boat landings and announces that restaurants can have limited indoor dining beginning May 11.
- May 18: The Governor announces that athletic facilities such as gyms and close-contact providers, including barber shops and hair salons, may reopen.

==== June ====
- June 11: The Governor announces a new state of emergency, allowing bowling alleys to open immediately with specific safety guidelines, and lifting restrictions on occupancy of retail establishments.

==== July ====
- July 11: McMaster announces temporary restrictions for bars and restaurants prohibiting them from selling alcoholic beverages after 11 pm and before 10 am.

==== August ====
- August 31: The University of South Carolina reported 1,172 cases among students and 9 among employees since August 1.

==== December ====
December 13: South Carolina announced that they will begin to receive Pfizer COVID-19 vaccine soon, and it will be prioritized for healthcare workers and nursing home staffs.

=== 2021 ===
==== January ====
- January 28: The first known case of COVID-19 variant from South Africa is detected in South Carolina. The two cases are also the first known cases of South Africa variant in the country.

==== February ====
- February 26: Governor McMaster is lifting the state's rules on approvals for large gatherings, and also lifting restrictions on alcohol sales. Previously, gatherings that have more than 250 people in attendance will require approvals from the state.

==== March ====
- March 5: Governor McMaster updated a previous executive order, saying masks are no longer mandatory on restaurants and government buildings. The town of Lexington dropped their face mask requirement in retail spaces.
- March 8 : Governor McMaster announced today that South Carolina will advance to Phase 1b of the state's COVID-19 vaccination plan, allowing anyone above aged 55, frontline workers with increased risk, and people with high-risk disabilities to be vaccinated.
- March 11: The governor has signed an executive order lowering the status of mask ordinances in restaurants from a requirement to a guideline, allowing some counties to drop the mask requirement for restaurants. North Myrtle Beach is dropping their mask requirement for restaurants.
- March 16: The city of Columbia extends their face mask requirement for 2 months.
- March 26: Governor McMaster announced that all South Carolinians aged 16 and up will become eligible to receive the COVID-19 vaccine beginning on March 31.

== Epidemiology and public health response ==
=== Initial exposures and spread ===
The first confirmed cases of COVID-19 in South Carolina were two women from Charleston County and Kershaw County. On April 2, 2020, DHEC announced that the virus had spread to all 46 counties in the state. Clusters of cases have been linked to assisted living and long-term care facilities as well as other congregate settings, but DHEC initially refused to identify facilities with cases or deaths for privacy reasons. However, DHEC began to report cases and deaths in nursing homes weekly on April 21, 2020, in response to a suit and publicity about the lack of disclosure. On July 10, DHEC reported that cases in young adults since June 1 had increased by 400% with about 22% (11,090) of the 50,458 cases reported to that date affecting 21-30 year olds and 15% affecting people under 20. DHEC announced the first cases of Multisystem Inflammatory Syndrome in Children caused by COVID-19 in two children under the age of ten on July 12.

=== Hospitalization and hospital capacity ===
According to DHEC, 12% of COVID-19 case have been hospitalized. On July 12, 2020, acute hospital bed occupancy reached a high of 81% in the Pee Dee region of the state. If there is a surge in COVID-19 patients, the state and the SC National Guard will implement a surge plan to meet the need, but initial steps would include cancelling elective surgeries.

=== Deaths ===
On March 16, 2020, the first confirmed death in South Carolina from COVID-19, a nursing home patient in Lexington Country was announced. While the largest percentage of cases has been in younger age groups, the highest percentage of deaths has occurred among those over age 65. In addition, as of April 8, 2020, African Americans, who make up 27% of the population, have been disproportionately affected by COVID-19 accounting for 46% of deaths and by July 12, 2020, this had declined only slightly to 43%

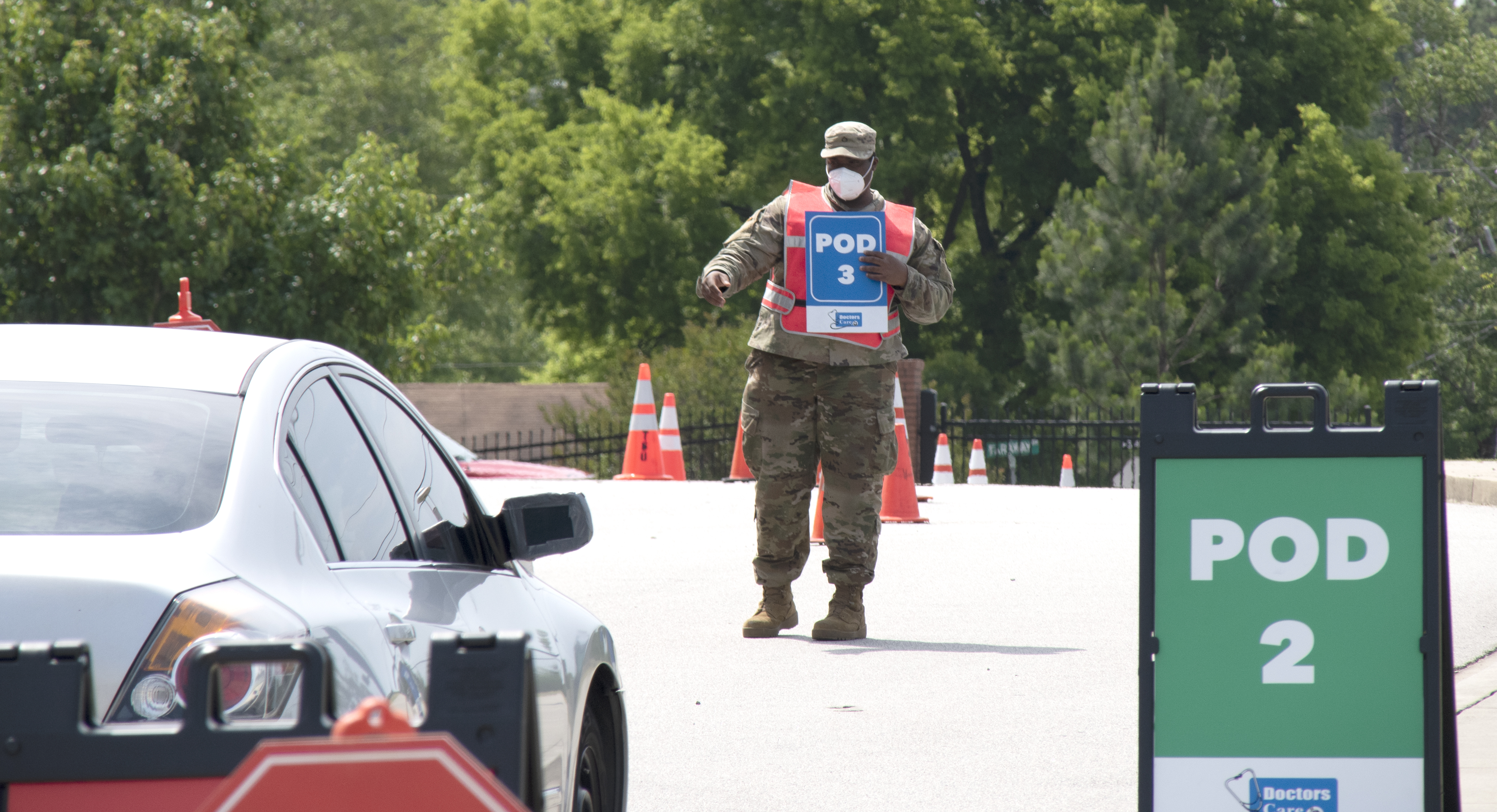
South Carolina National Guard directs traffic at Richland County testing site.

=== Testing ===
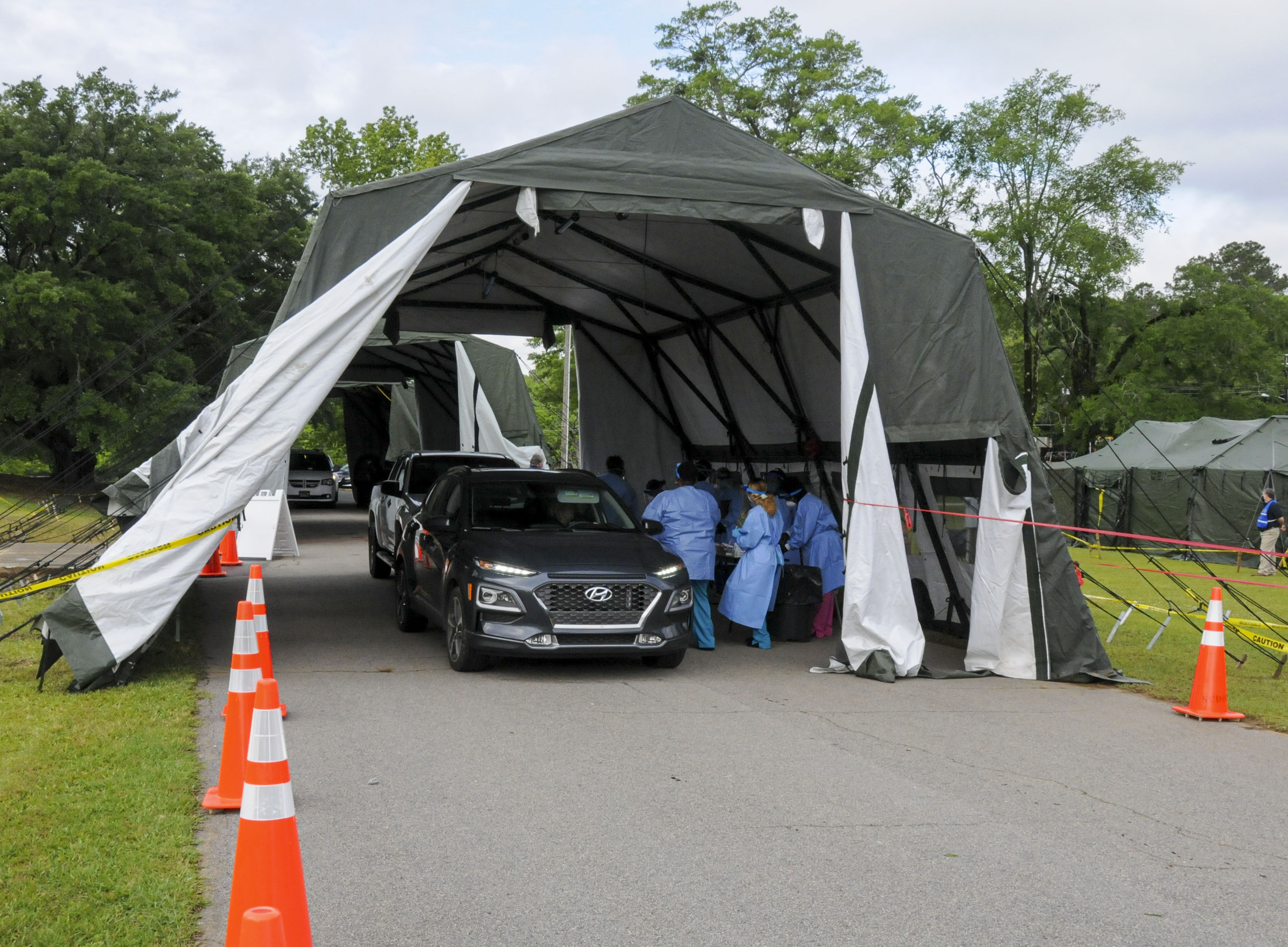
South Carolina National Guard provides tents in support of mobile testing site.

South Carolina has been criticized for lagging behind other states in COVID-19 testing and on May 11, 2020, was ranked last for its testing rate per one million people; however, by July 12, it was ranked 35 out of the fifty states and District of Columbia in one ranking and 44th out of 50 states trying to reach a minimum level of testing needed to reduce the spread of COVID-19. On May 11, 2020, DHEC initiated a plan to test all nursing home residents and staff for COVID-19 by the end of the month. Current testing includes approximately 25% by the Public Health Laboratory and additional testing implemented by private laboratories

=== Contact tracing ===
DHEC has worked to increase staffing for contact tracing of COVID-19 positive cases expanding from 20 to almost 2,000 contact tracers in mid-May and roughly 5,000 by the start of July. However, the increase in cases in July has led to concern that contact tracing efforts will be overwhelmed.

=== Modeling and projections ===
Models that project the trajectory of the COVID-19 pandemic in South Carolina are used by the DHEC to forecast resource needs. Initial models suggested that South Carolina would reach its peak in COVID-19 cases in April, with 680 deaths estimated by August 4. DHEC shares current state-level models from the Institute for Health Metrics and Evaluation at the University of Washington (the IHME model). These can be compared with state-level models and projections by other organizations outside the state including the Covid ActNow projections and the forecasts of total deaths and total hospitalizations received and compiled by the Centers for Disease Control. As of July 15, a model from independent researchers at Pandemic Central provides daily new case projections for counties in South Carolina and elsewhere.

== Impacts ==
=== Economy ===
In April 2020, South Carolina received $1.9 billion in federal relief funds from the CARES Act. From this amount, $1.2 billion was allocated most of the funds have been allocated for jobless benefits and for schools, including extending broadband to rural communities to improve internet access. By mid May, almost half a million people had applied for unemployment benefits since mid-March when the pandemic began in South Carolina. In the first week of July, 198,318 people continued to seek unemployment benefits. On July 31, the extra $600 per week in federal unemployment assistance is slated to end, reducing the unemployment amount to $326 per week or less.

In late April, McMaster established the accelerateSC task force to assess and recommend economic revitalization plans for South Carolina during the pandemic. The task force's final report was issued on May 28, 2020. The report contains 42 recommendations including using federal aid for the state unemployment trust fund, for expanding internet broadband access, to add five days of school for K-8 education, and for health care costs.

=== Schools ===
==== K-12 schools ====
On March 15, McMaster announced the closure of all public schools in the state until March 31. This was extended through the end of April, and on April 22, McMaster and Superintendent Spearman announced the closure of schools in South Carolina for the remainder of the school year.

In order to advise the SC Department of Education and make recommendations about how to best meet the needs of students during the COVID-19 pandemic in SC, Spearman established a task force, AccelerateEd, composed of educators and administrators representing different facets of the K–12 public education system. AccelerateEd released their recommendations regarding the 2020–2021 school year on June 22, 2020. The report contains guidelines and models for reopening, as well as the recommendation to follow best practices for health and safety recommended by DHEC and the CDC. On July 15, McMaster argued that school districts should re-open for in-person instruction the day after Labor Day. However, Spearman stated that "School leaders, in consultation with public health experts, are best positioned to determine how in-person operations should be carried out to fit the needs of their local communities", and teachers also expressed concern about re-opening in person.

On July 20, McMaster announced that private K-12 schools will get $32 million (out of $48.5 million) in federal COVID-19 aid from the governor's discretionary education account to assist low income families with tuition. The Palmetto State Teachers Association and the teachers group SC For Ed both responded that they were disappointed in McMaster's decision and think that the funds would be better put to use to support public schools in South Carolina since they are currently facing significant challenges during the pandemic.

On July 22, Orangeburg County Circuit Court Judge Dickson temporarily blocked McMaster's plan to allocate $32 million in funding for private education pending court arguments.

==== Higher education ====
On March 19, the governor ordered all public colleges and universities in the state to finish their semesters online.

In May, the University of South Carolina announced that teaching would be in person in the fall but that fall break would be cancelled and learning would be online after Thanksgiving. Clemson University announced that they will reopen for in-person learning this fall with all students and staff required to be tested for COVID-19 within five days prior to arriving on campus.

Universities and colleges in South Carolina will receive over $100 million from the CARES Act stimulus package. The funds are to cover costs such as refunds to students and other costs related to the pandemic, and at least half of the funding must be distributed directly to students. McMaster announced that the eight Historically Black Colleges and Universities in South Carolina would be allocated $2.4 million to enhance online learning from the Governor's Emergency Education Relief (GEER) fund.

=== School reopening ===
Betsy DeVos has told public school districts that they wouldn't receive federal money unless schools are fully reopened for the 2020–21 school year. In early September a 28 year old elementary school teacher died in Columbia, South Carolina from COVID-19 related complications. Contact tracing procedures were initiated to notify three other employees, but because her classroom was virtual, she had not had close contact with any students.

=== Sports ===
In college sports, the National Collegiate Athletic Association cancelled all winter and spring tournaments, most notably the Division I men's and women's basketball tournaments, affecting colleges and universities statewide. This affected South Carolina especially, as the Bon Secours Wellness Arena in Greenville was set to host first and second-round games in the women's tournament. On March 16, the National Junior College Athletic Association also canceled the remainder of the winter seasons as well as the spring seasons.

On May 17, NASCAR returned to action with a series of races in the national series all held behind closed doors at Darlington Raceway in the Florence metropolitan market, with The Real Heroes 400 and Toyota 500km. The events were the first major motorsport events to be held in the country after the pandemic pause.

== Statistics ==
The monitoring and testing of COVID-19 in South Carolina per the Department of Health and Environmental Control is as follows with data reported on December 27, 2020:

Type	Positive tests	Negative tests	Total
Viral tests	360,650	1,043,249	1,222,621
Antigen tests	43,968	345,849	389,817
Antibody tests	16,320	88,512	104,832
Unknown test type	126	1,247	1,373
Total tests	421,064	3,185,204	3,606,268

== See also ==
- Timeline of the COVID-19 pandemic in the United States
- COVID-19 pandemic in the United States for impact on the country
- COVID-19 pandemic for impact on other countries
