= Hauck =

Hauck is a German patronymic family name, derived from the Germanic given name and surname Hugo. It may refer to the following notable persons:

- Albert Hauck (1845–1918), German theologian and church historian
- Alexander Hauck (born 1988), German international rugby union player
- Bobby Hauck (born 1964), American college football coach
- Emma Hauck (1878–1920), German outsider artist
- Frederick Hauck (1941–2025), captain in the United States Navy, a fighter pilot and NASA astronaut
- Friedrich-Wilhelm Hauck (1897–1979), German general
- Guenther Hauck (born 1941), known as "Tatunca Nara", a German-Brazilian jungle guide and self-styled Indian chieftain
- Hans Hauck (1920–2003), German Army personnel of World War II
- John Hauck (1829–1896), German-born American brewer, bank president, and baseball executive
- Katharina Hauck, British economist
- Minnie Hauk (1851–1929), American operatic soprano
- Rainer Hauck (born 1978), German association football (soccer) player
- Rebecca Hauck (born 1969), American conwoman, accomplice to Matthew Cox
- Tim Hauck (born 1966), American former gridiron football player

In Russian variation, Gauk:

- Alexander Gauk (1893–1963), Russian conductor and composer

== Other uses ==
- Hauck Auditorium, both on the campuses of the University of Maine and Stanford University
- Hauck House Museum, a historic house museum in Cincinnati, Ohio
- Hauck, a German brand of baby equipment
- The Hauck Brewery, a historic brewery in Harrison, New Jersey, from 1881 to 1920
