= Shiranee Sriskandan =

Professor of Infectious Diseases

Shiranee Sriskandan FRCP
- Born: 1964 (age 61–62)
- Education: Bromley High School
- Alma mater: University of Cambridge; Imperial College London; St Bartholomew's Hospital
- Scientific career
- Fields: Infectious Diseases
- Institutions: Imperial College London
- Thesis: A study of the superantigen streptococcal pyrogenic exotoxin A in invasive group A streptococcal disease (1997)

Shiranee Sriskandan is a British academic who is Professor of Infectious Diseases at Imperial College London and Honorary Consultant at Hammersmith Hospital. Her research considers how Gram-positive bacteria cause disease, with a particular focus on the bacteria Streptococcus pyogenes.

== Early life and education ==
Sriskandan was born in 1964 in Yorkshire. Her father, Sri Lankan-born bridge designer Kanagaratnam Sriskandan (1930-2010), served as Britain's Chief Highway Engineer. As a child, Sriskandan was interested in physics and space science. Sriskandan attended Bromley High School in Greater London from 1973 to 1982. Her brother studied medicine, and this inspired her to become a physician too. Sriskandan completed her undergraduate degree in medicine at Clare College, Cambridge and St Bartholomew's Hospital. She completed her doctoral research on Streptococcus pyogenes at Imperial College London. She specialised in infectious diseases and completed a Medical Research Council clinical fellowship. In 2001 Sriskandan was made a Fellow of the Royal College of Physicians.

== Research and career ==
Every year, 616 million cases of pharyngitis are caused by the bacteria streptococcus pyogenes. The bacterium can cause a range of diseases, from sepsis, to skin infections and pharyngitis. Unfortunately, 1 in 5 patients who have an invasive Group A streptococcal infections die. The complications can include rheumatic fever, toxic shock syndrome and valvular heart disease. Sriskandan created a new asymptomatic nasopharyngeal carriage model that can help people better understand streptococcal infection. The dosing and analysis of the model were analysed using a novel imaging technique; bioluminescent bacteria. She has demonstrated that bioluminescence can be used for the longitudinal imaging of bacterial infection in mice, which can increase the time mice can be used for investigations and reduce the need to cull animals between experiments. Each mouse can serve as its own experimental control, which improves the quality of the research, and bioluminescence imaging data can be used to quantify the dosage of a particular bacteria. Alongside her fundamental scientific research, Sriskandan has documented the stories of the first people to study Group A streptococcal infections – including Dora Colebrook.

Following the 2014 increase in scarlet fever, Sriskandan became interested in whether it was due to an increase in Group A streptococcus (Strep A). To analyse this, she studied the number of laboratory confirmed cases of Group A streptococcal infections. She demonstrated that whilst the majority of cases of scarlet fever in 2014 were caused by the strain emm3 and emm4, infections of the emm1 strain increased annually. She showed that this particular novel emm1 strain ('M1UK') produced considerally more streptococcal pyrogenic exotoxin A than other emm1 strains, which could explain the increase in scarlet fever.

== COVID-19 - 2020 ==
Sriskandan is part of an Imperial College London, University of Edinburgh and University of Liverpool collaboration to understand the progression of Coronavirus disease 2019. It was one of the first research projects to receive funding from the UK Medical Research Council in response to the pandemic. The International Severe Acute Respiratory Infection Consortium (ISARIC) was established after the 2009 influenza pandemic in collaboration with Public Health England. Sriskandan's work runs alongside the efforts of Imperial College colleagues Robin Shattock and Neil Ferguson in combatting COVID-19.

== Awards and honours ==
Sriskandan was elected a Fellow of the Royal College of Physicians (FRCP) in 2001. In the same year, Sriskandan awarded the prestigious ESCMID Young Investigator Award which recognises excellence in research. She was elected a Fellow of the Academy of Medical Sciences in 2022.

== Selected publications ==
- Parker, Stephen J.; Windsor, Alastair C. J. (2002), "The Immunology of Sepsis", Immunology for Surgeons, Springer London, pp. 53–70, doi:10.1007/978-1-4471-0201-4_3, ISBN 978-1-85233-482-6
- Hopkins, P. A.; Sriskandan, S. (2005). "Mammalian Toll-like receptors: To immunity and beyond". Clinical and Experimental Immunology. 140 (3): 395–407. doi:10.1111/j.1365-2249.2005.02801.x. PMC 1809390. PMID 15932500.
- Sriskandan, Shiranee; Cohen, Jonathan (1999-06-01). "GRAM-POSITIVE SEPSIS: Mechanisms and Differences from Gram-Negative Sepsis". Infectious Disease Clinics of North America. 13 (2): 397–412. doi:10.1016/S0891-5520(05)70082-9. ISSN 0891-5520. PMID 10340174.
