= Lazaar =

Laazar is a surname. Notable people with the surname include:

- Belhassan Lazaar (born 1992), Moroccan footballer
- Fiona Lazaar (born 1983), French politician
- Kamel Lazaar (born 1952), Tunisian-Swiss financier
- Lina Lazaar (born 1983), Tunisian art critic
- Mehdi Lazaar (born 1993), Belgian footballer
- Moncef Lazaâr (1942–2018), Tunisian actor and screenwriter
