= List of COVID-19 simulation models =

COVID-19 simulation models are mathematical infectious disease models for the spread of COVID-19. The list should not be confused with COVID-19 apps used mainly for digital contact tracing.

Note that some of the applications listed are website-only models or simulators, and some of those rely on (or use) real-time data from other sources.

== Models with the most scientific backing ==
The sub-list contains simulators that are based on theoretical models. Due to the high number of pre-print research created and driving by the COVID-19 pandemic, especially newer models should only be considered with further scientific rigor.

=== Simulations and models ===
- Chen et al. simulation based on Bats-Hosts-Reservoir-People (BHRP) model (simplified to RP only)
- CoSim19 – Prof Lehr, based on SEIRD model
- COVID-19 MOBILITY MODELING – Stanford based on SEIR model
- COVID-19 Simulator – Harvard Medical School based on a validated system dynamics (compartment) model
- COVID-19 Surge – CDC
- Covid Act Now – former Googler Max Henderson, Alaskan politician Jonathan Kreiss-Tomkins and epidemiologist Nirav D. Shah.
- COVIDSIM – by Mark Kok Yew Ng et al.
- CovidSim – Imperial College London, MRC Centre for Global Infectious Disease Analysis, Neil Ferguson et al.
- CovidSim – Research project by Munich University of Applied Sciences, Prof. Köster
- COVIDSim – written in MATLAB by Ng and Gui
- CovidSIM.eu – Martin Eichner, Markus Schwehm supported by University of Tübingen and sponsored by the German Federal Ministry of Education and Research.
- CovidSIM – Schneider et al.
- CovRadar – for molecular surveillance of the Corona spike protein
- De-Leon and Pederiva – A dynamic particle Monte Carlo algorithm based on the basic principles of statistical physics.
- Dr. Ghaffarzadegan's model
- Event Horizon – COVID-19 – HU Berlin based on SIR-X model
- Evolutionary AI – "Non-pharmaceutical interventions (NPIs) that the AI generates for different countries and regions over time, their predicted effect."
- From the index case to global spread – Dr. Siwiak, based on GLEAM framework embedding actual population densities, commute patterns and long-range travel networks.
- IHME model – Institute for Health Metrics and Evaluation COVID model
- MEmilio – an open source high performance Modular EpideMIcs simuLatIOn software based on hybrid graph-SIR-type model with commuter testing between regions and vaccination strategies and agent-based models
- OpenCOVID – Swiss Tropical and Public Health Institute (Swiss TPH) – Open access individual-based transmission model of SARS-CoV-2 infection and COVID-19 disease dynamics implemented in R.
- OxCGRT – The Oxford COVID-19 Government Response Tracker
- SC-COSMO – Stanford-CIDE Coronavirus Simulation Model
- SDL-PAND: A digital Twin of the pandemic situation in Catalonia.
- SECIR – Model by Helmholtz Centre for Infection Research
- SEIR model on a small-world network used estimate the effect of non-pharmaceutical interventions on the structure of the transmission network
- SIAM's Epidemiology Collection
- SIR_{SS} model that combines the dynamics of social stress with classical epidemic models. Social stress is described by the tools of social physics.
- Smart Investment of Virus RNA Testing Resources to Enhance Covid-19 Mitigation
- Youyang Gu COVID model

=== Genome databases ===
Several of these models make use of genome databases, including the following:

- DNA Data Bank of Japan
- European Nucleotide Archive
- GISAID
- Phylogenetic Assignment of Named Global Outbreak Lineages

=== Consortia, research clusters, other collections ===
- CDC list of Forecast Inclusion and Assumptions – large list with different models, etc.
- CORSMA – EU consortium (COVID-19-Outbreak Response combining E-health, Serolomics, Modelling, Artificial Intelligence and Implementation Research)
- COVID-19 Forecast Hub – Serves as a central repository of forecasts and predictions from over 50 international research groups.
- Nextstrain – Open-source project to harness the scientific and public health potential of pathogen genome data
  - See also Nextstrain SARS-CoV-2 resources
- SIMID – Simulation Models of Infectious Diseases – Belgium research consortium
- RAMP – Rapid Assistance in Modelling the Pandemic (UK)
- UT Austin COVID-19 Modeling Consortium
- Computational Approaches to Foster Innovation in the Treatment and Diagnosis of Infectious Diseases by Frontiers

=== Vaccination monitors, models or dashboards ===
Note: The following (additional) resources are mostly based on actual data, not simulation. They might include predictive features, e. g. vaccination rate estimation, but in general are not based on theoretical or modeling grounds as the main list of this article. Nonetheless, forecasting remains important. (See for example the COVID-19 Forecast Hub)

- COVID-19 Dashboard - Center for Systems Science and Engineering (CSSE) at Johns Hopkins University (JHU)
- COVIDVaxView by the CDC
- Datahub Novel Coronavirus 2019 dataset - COVID-19 dataset Coronavirus disease 2019 (COVID-19) time series listing confirmed cases, reported deaths and reported recoveries.
- Impfdashboard.de - Germany's vaccination monitor
- Simulation der COVID19-Impfkampagne - Monitor for vaccination-campaign in Germany by Zi Data Science Lab
- The Institute for Health Metrics and Evaluation (IHME) COVID-19 Projections
  - See also Institute for Health Metrics and Evaluation COVID model

== Models with less scientific backing ==
The following models are purely for educational purposes only.

- Cellular Defense Automata model
- Overview of SARS-CoV-2 variants and mutations that are of interest
- Covid-19 Simulator
- COVID19: Top 7 - A curated list posted on Medium
- github.com/topics: covid-19
- ISEE Systems COVID-19 Simulator
- nCoV2019.live - "Numbers you need at a quick glance" by Schiffmann/Conlon
  - cov19.cc- by Conlon
- Simul8 - COVID-19 Simulation Resources
- Simulating coronavirus with the SIR model
- Virus Spread Simulation

== Other related simulations, models or data sources ==
- (American Chemical Society) CAS COVID-19 BIOINDICATOR EXPLORER
- CDC's COVID Data Tracker
- Civil Society Partners in Solidarity against COVID-19 (CSPAC): Full, live, global, COVID-19 Status Report for 251 locales & 71 Ships
- Cornell Institute for Social & Economic Research (CISER): COVID-19 Data Sources
- Eulerian–Lagrangian multiphase modeling, e. g. for transmission of COVID-19 in elevators based on CFD
- Onset of Symptoms of COVID-19 simulation (Stochastic Progression Model) by Larsen et al.
- Our World in Data's Coronavirus Source Data
- The Atlantic's COVID 19 Tracking Project
- Vadere - Open Source Framework for Pedestrian and Crowd Simulation
- WHO Coronavirus (COVID-19) Dashboard

== Trainings and other resources ==
- Infectious Disease Modelling Specialization - provided on Coursera by Imperial College London
- Introducing the COVID-19 Simulator and Machine Learning Toolkit for Predicting COVID-19 Spread - AWS Machine Learning Blog

== See also ==
- Bioinformatics
- Computational biology
- Computer simulation
- Mathematical modelling of infectious disease
- SIR Model
- Zoe Health Study
