= Youyang Gu COVID model =

Disease model

The Youyang Gu COVID-19 model (sometimes abbreviated YYG) is a computer software disease model for COVID-19 produced by independent data scientist Youyang Gu.

The model is unique in applying machine learning to derive the basic reproduction number (R_{0}) from data published by Johns Hopkins University's Center for Systems Science and Engineering (CSSE), and it seeks to minimize the error between its projections and CSSE data on the number of United States COVID-19 deaths.

== Use and endorsements ==
Gu's model was one of seven featured in The New York Times' survey of models and one of nine in FiveThirtyEight's survey, was cited by the Centers for Disease Control (CDC) in its estimates for U.S. recovery, and was one of three listed by the State of Washington on its "COVID-19 risk assessment dashboard" used to determine the date the state would reopen its economy after the COVID-19 pandemic in Washington. The model's author claims it is the only one cited by CDC that is not receiving public funding.

Yann LeCun, Facebook's chief AI scientist and professor at the Courant Institute of Mathematical Sciences, stated in May 2020 that Gu's model "is the most accurate to predict deaths from COVID-19", surpassing the accuracy of the well-funded Institute for Health Metrics and Evaluation COVID model. Its superior accuracy was also noted by Silicon Valley newspaper The Mercury News and by The Economist, which called it "more accurate than forecasts from many established outfits".

== Youyang Gu biography ==
Gu is a 2015 graduate of Massachusetts Institute of Technology. He was born in Shanghai in 1993 or 1994 and grew up in Urbana, Illinois.

== See also ==
- List of COVID-19 simulation models
