= Helen Ward (scientist) =

British physician and professor of public health

Helen Ward FRCP FFPH
- Education: University of Sheffield; London School of Hygiene & Tropical Medicine; City, University of London
- Scientific career
- Fields: Sexually transmitted infections HIV; Patient experience Breast cancer Genomics
- Workplaces: St Mary's Hospital, London; Imperial College London
- Thesis: Sex work and health in London (2010)
- Website: www.imperial.ac.uk/people/h.ward

Helen Ward is a British physician who is professor of public health at Imperial College London and director of the patient experience research centre. During the COVID-19 pandemic, Ward called for the Government of the United Kingdom to be more proactive in their response to the outbreak of SARS-CoV-2.

== Early life and education ==
Ward trained in medicine at the University of Sheffield where she was awarded a Bachelor of Medicine, Bachelor of Surgery (MB ChB) degree in 1981. In 1984, Ward joined St Mary's Hospital, London as a junior doctor. She specialised in the medicine of genitourinary systems and public health. She earned a Master of Science (MSc) degree in epidemiology at the London School of Hygiene & Tropical Medicine. She completed her PhD at City, University of London, where her research investigated sex work and the health of sex workers in London. She studied how several determinants, including social class and gender, impact the likelihood of acquiring a sexually transmitted infection.

== Research and career ==
Ward has dedicated her career to understanding the epidemiology of sexually transmitted infections. In 1986, Ward helped to found the Praed Street project, a sexual health clinic that provides medical services for sex workers. Throughout her career Ward researched the health of sex workers, looking to prevent the spread of HIV and other communicable diseases. Her study, which followed sex workers in London from the mid '80s to 2000s, was the first longitudinal project to analyse the impact of prostitution on women. She showed that sex workers frequently experienced violence, and that their physical and mental health was impacted by stigma and criminalisation. In 1993, she established EUROPAP, the European Intervention projects AIDS prevention for prostitutes.

Ward was promoted to Professor of Public Health at Imperial College London in 2009. Since 2011 she has led the National Institute for Health Research (NIHR) Patient Experience Research Centre. Her research combines anthropology and ethnography with clinical medicine in an effort to improve health care quality. Since 2019, she has been a research lead at the Jameel Institute for Disease and Emergency Analytics (J-IDEA) at Imperial.

=== Coronavirus leadership ===
During the COVID-19 pandemic, Ward became concerned that mixed messages from the UK government had confused the public about how to avoid catching the disease. She described Boris Johnson's proposed herd immunity as "worrying, and a distraction from the important vital goal of flattening the peak of the epidemic".

Ward worked with the Imperial College London Patient Experience Research Centre and YouGov to understand public sentiment surrounding SARS-CoV-2. She reported that 77% of the public were worried about the outbreak in the UK, and that 88% would isolate if recommended to by a health professional. She worked with the Medical Research Council (MRC) and the Jameel Institute for Disease and Emergency Analytics (J-IDEA) to create an online course that helped to explain the science of SARS-CoV-2. The course, which is hosted on Coursera, covers basic epidemiology, economics and communication. It was updated as more information about the virus became available.

In April 2020, Ward wrote an op-ed for The Guardian that criticised the United Kingdom government's handling of the coronavirus outbreak. Despite mounting evidence from the World Health Organization and researchers in Wuhan, the UK did not monitor community cases, contact trace or immediately enforce a stringent lockdown. On 13 April 2020, Ward tweeted, "It's very sad that so many people have died, and so many more are desperately ill because politicians refused to listen to advice". In The Guardian Ward wrote, "Scientists like us said lock down earlier; we said test, trace, isolate. But they decided they knew better". She believes that the strict social distancing should have been enforced ten days earlier. Ward has called for case isolation, increased testing and tracking and the suppression of transmissions in hospitals through the appropriate personal protective equipment (PPE). In particular, Ward called for an investigation into the health disparities experienced by black and minority ethnic patients. When asked about why the outbreak worse in the United Kingdom than Germany, Ward remarked, "There was a lack of testing, lack of PPE, lack of ventilators and the lack of hospital beds and NHS capacity, a result of 10-year cuts,".

Ward has linked her professional commentary to her personal political opinions, tweeting "'professional academic me' – doctor, professor – is inseparable from the me that cares about justice, equality and health. And that means kicking out the Tories, stopping Brexit, supporting Labour, opposing racism".

== Awards and honours ==
Ward is Fellow of the Royal College of Physicians (FRCP) and a Fellow of the Faculty of Public Health (FFPH). She was elected a Fellow of the Academy of Medical Sciences in 2025.

== Selected publications ==
- Ward, Helen; Rönn, Minttu (2011). "The contribution of STIs to the sexual transmission of HIV". Current Opinion in HIV and AIDS. 5 (4): 305–10. doi:10.1097/COH.0b013e32833a8844. PMC 2923028. PMID 20543605.
- Ward, Helen; Fidler, Sarah; Gerver, Sarah M.; Kim, Sung-Hee (2014). "Adherence to antiretroviral therapy in adolescents living with HIV: systematic review and meta-analysis". AIDS. 28 (13): 1945–56. doi:10.1097/QAD.0000000000000316. PMC 4162330. PMID 24845154.
- Ward, Helen; Day, Sophie (1999). "Risky business: Health and safety in the sex industry over a 9 year period". Sexually Transmitted Infections. 75 (5): 340–343. doi:10.1136/sti.75.5.340. OCLC 775385630. PMC 1758230. PMID 10616360.
