= MRC Centre for Global Infectious Disease Analysis =

Research centre at Imperial College London

- Founded at: Imperial College London, Faculty of Medicine
- Headquarters: London, England
- Director: Azra Ghani
- Website: www.imperial.ac.uk/mrc-global-infectious-disease-analysis/
- Formerly called: MRC Centre for Outbreak Analysis and Modelling

The MRC Centre for Global Infectious Disease Analysis is research centre at Imperial College London and a WHO collaborating centre. It is part of the Department of Infectious Disease Epidemiology at School of Public Health within the Imperial College Faculty of Medicine. Azra Ghani is the director of the centre. The centre also collaborates UK Health Protection Agency, and the US Centre for Disease Control. The centre's main research areas are disease outbreak analysis and modelling, vaccines, global health analytics, antimicrobial resistance, and developing methods and tools for studying these areas.

== History ==
The centre was previously called the MRC Centre for Outbreak Analysis and Modelling. It has also been referred to as the MRC Center for Outbreak Analysis and Modeling Its founding was confirmed in March 2007, with Imperial College London hosting the center with funding from the Medical Research Council (MRC).

In 2016, Neil Ferguson was serving as director of the MRC Center for Outbreak Analysis and Modeling. That year he was lead author on a paper concerning Zika. Published in Science, Ferguson's research suggested the outbreak in South America was undergoing a sharp decline, and would "burn itself out" within a year or 18 months. In 2016, Ferguson published a study in September 2016 raising concerns that wrong implementation of the newly licensed dengue virus vaccine Dengvaxia could increase the number of cases of the disease.

In 2025 the centre lost its Medical Research Council funding as part of a general withdrawal of all research funding from all units.

=== COVID-19 pandemic response ===
The centre—together with the Jameel Institute for Disease and Emergency Analytics—formed the COVID-19 Response Team in respond to the COVID-19 pandemic. On 16 March 2020 the team produced a research forecast of various scenarios for spread of the disease in the United Kingdom and the United States. Without any mitigation their forecast showed local health care capabilities vastly overwhelmed by the epidemic wave. Periodic cycles of quarantine followed by softer social distancing were recommended, with quarantines in effect two thirds of the time. On 30 March, a study on 11 European countries was published. It provided estimates of the situation as of 28 March (observed and modelised with CovidSim), and projections for 31 March given current expectations, no action, and the difference. It also provided a list of government policies and their respective absolute dates. As of March 2021, the COVID-19 Response Team has produced 43 reports.

== See also ==
- Centre for Genomic Pathogen Surveillance
