= Epidemics (journal) =

- Discipline: Medicine
- Language: English

Publication details
- Publisher: Elsevier
- Open access: Yes
- Impact factor: 3.239 (2018)

Standard abbreviations
- ISO 4: Epidemics

Indexing
- ISSN: 1755-4365

Epidemics is a peer-reviewed academic journal of epidemics. It is published by Elsevier. Its founding editors include Neil Ferguson.
