= Hassan Jameel =

Saudi businessman at Abdullatiif Jamil Saudi Arabia (born 20 December 1988)

- حسن جميل
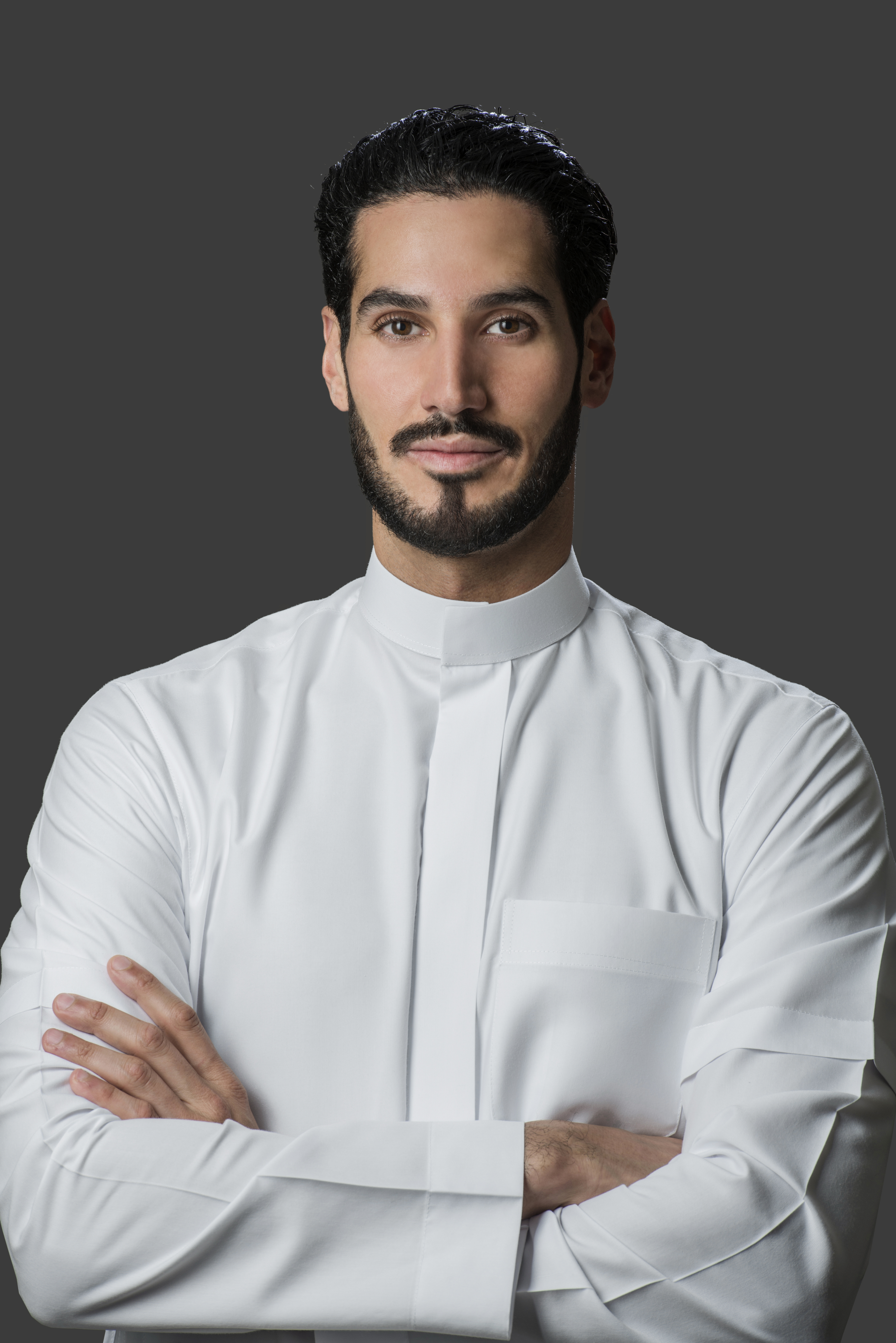
- Jameel in 2017
- Born: Hassan Mohammed Abdul Latif Jameel; December 1978 (age 47); Saudi Arabia
- Education: Sophia University (BA); London Business School (MBA)
- Title: Deputy President and Vice Chairman, Saudi Arabia, of Abdul Latif Jameel
- Spouse: Lina Lazaar (m. 2012; div. 2017)

Hassan Mohammed Abdul Latif Jameel (Arabic: حسن محمد عبد اللطيف جميل; born December 1978) is a Saudi businessman and philanthropist. He is deputy president and vice chairman of Saudi Arabia operations at the international conglomerate Abdul Latif Jameel.

== Early life and education ==
Hassan Jameel is the middle son of Mohammed Abdul Latif Jameel, chairman and president of Abdul Latif Jameel. He is the grandson of Abdul Latif Jameel (1909–1993), who founded the eponymous company in 1945 and acquired distribution rights to Toyota vehicles in Saudi Arabia in 1955.

Jameel attended high school in Japan. In 1997 he entered Sophia University in Tokyo, and graduated in 2001 with a Bachelor of Arts in international economics. He subsequently obtained an MBA from the London Business School.

== Career ==
In 2004, Jameel trained in the domestic kaizen department of the Toyota Motor Corporation in Japan. Following his time at Toyota, he returned to Saudi Arabia to work in the diversified family-owned business Abdul Latif Jameel, one of the largest independent distributors of Toyota and Lexus vehicles in the world. He currently serves as deputy president and vice chairman of domestic Saudi Arabia operations.

In 2011, Jameel met with R. J. Scaringe, the founder of the small auto-manufacturing startup Rivian. Jameel asked Scaringe to produce an electric pickup truck, and Abdul Latif Jameel made a large investment in Rivian, and became Rivian's largest investor. Jameel also became a member of Rivian's board of directors.

== Philanthropy ==
Jameel is vice chairman of Community Jameel, an international philanthropic organization founded in 2003 that promotes such social and economic initiatives as refugee education, job creation, poverty alleviation, food and water security, and healthcare improvement.

He is also involved in humanitarian programs with the United Nations High Commissioner for Refugees.

== Personal life ==
Jameel is an art collector and keen supporter of the arts. He married Tunisian art critic and Ibraaz co-founder Lina Lazaar in 2012. The marriage ended in divorce in 2017.

He was in a relationship with Rihanna from 2017 to 2020.

Jameel is fluent in Arabic, English, and Japanese.
