= Llanidloes High School =

Location
- Llangurig Road; Llanidloes, Powys, SY18 6EX; Wales; 52.4419°N 3.5452°W

Information
- Type: Mixed, comprehensive
- Motto: GOFAL - Great Opportunities For All to Learn
- Local authority: Powys
- Head teacher: Daniel Owen
- Gender: Mixed
- Age: 11 to 18
- Website: www.llanidloeshighschool.co.uk

Llanidloes High School is a state secondary school and sixth form in Llanidloes, Powys. As of 2023, there were 702 pupils on roll at the school. It is an English-medium school with significant Welsh language provision, with pupils attending from other parts of Powys.

The school was rated good in a 2016 Estyn report and green in the 2019 national school categorization. The school was also included in The Times top ten sixth forms in Wales in 2018 and 2019. As of a February 2026 report, Estyn has placed the school on special measures.

The school is also home to the North Powys ASD centre.

In 2024, 10.8 per cent of pupils spoke Welsh at home.

As of June 2024, the school is being investigated for promoting Evangelical Christianity to pupils.

== Notable former pupils ==
- Neil Ferguson, infectious disease epidemiologist
- Iwan Roberts, former footballer
- Adam Woodyatt, actor
