= Kalipso Chalkidou =

Public health academic and researcher

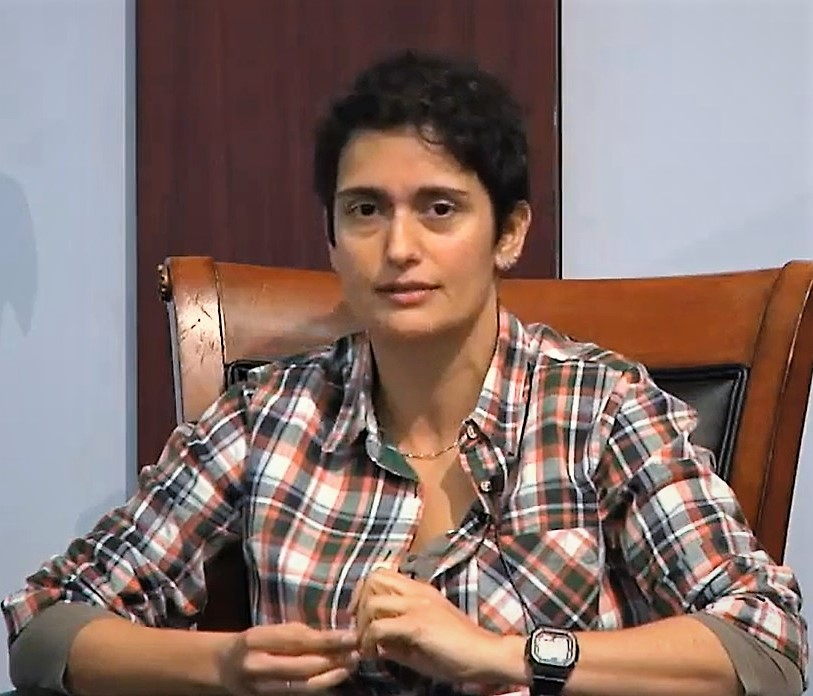
- Chalkidou speaks at the Center for Strategic & International Studies in 2015
- Born: 1976 (age 49–50)
- Education: Newcastle University; National and Kapodistrian University of Athens
- Scientific career
- Workplaces: Imperial College London; National Institute for Health and Care Excellence; London School of Hygiene & Tropical Medicine; Johns Hopkins Bloomberg School of Public Health

Kalipso Chalkidou (born in 1976) is the Head of Health Finance at The Global Fund to Fight AIDS, Tuberculosis and Malaria and a visiting professor at Imperial College London. Previously she was Director of Global Health Policy at the Center for Global Development and Professor of Practice in Global Health at Imperial College London. Her research considers how local expertise can inform the allocation of scientific and healthcare resources.

== Early life and education ==
Chalkidou was born in Greece. Initially, she wanted to become a train driver. Instead, Chalkidou became a physician. She originally studied medicine at the National and Kapodistrian University of Athens. She completed a doctoral degree in molecular biology at Newcastle University. She has said that one of her greatest inspirations was Che Guevara. Whilst completing her doctoral research, Chalkidou completed her clinical rotations in basic surgery. Her research considered novel therapies for prostate cancer.

== Research and career ==
After earning her doctorate Chalkidou joined National Institute for Health and Care Excellence (NICE) as Associate Director of Research. In this capacity, she evaluated novel healthcare technologies and reviewed the social value judgements of the NICE committees. She held an honorary position at the London School of Hygiene & Tropical Medicine, where she studied applications of pharmacoeconomics in Japan.

In 2007 Chalkidou joined the Johns Hopkins Bloomberg School of Public Health, where she was made a Harkness fellow in Health Policy and Practice. As part of her fellowship, Chalkidou studied how to translate evidence into a research agenda. She argued that healthcare decision making should be rooted in research policies. On her return to the United Kingdom Chalkidou helped to set up National Institute for Health and Care Excellence (NICE) International. Here she established the International Decision Support Initiative (IDSI), a network of policy makers, researchers and development experts which was largely funded by the Bill & Melinda Gates Foundation.

Chalkidou moved to Imperial College London in 2016. In 2018 Bill & Melinda Gates Foundation awarded Chalkidou and IDSI a $14.5 million grant to expand healthcare access in the developing world. IDSI works with governments in the developing world to support their health policy, looking to achieve value-for-money in the medical decision making. With IDSI, Chalkidou led national health reform programmes in Colombia, India and the Middle East. She supported Tanzania in their prioritisation list of essential medicines, which freed up essential resources for more effective treatments.

Chalkidou was Director of Global Health Policy and Senior Fellow at the Center for Global Development. Her research focussed on helping governments improve health policy.

From 2019, she was a research lead at the Jameel Institute (J-IDEA) at Imperial.

She was appointed to the Board of Directors at the International Society for Pharmacoeconomics and Outcomes Research (ISPOR) in 2020.

She is currently the Head of Health Finance at The Global Fund to Fight AIDS, Tuberculosis and Malaria.

== Select publications ==
- Thorpe, Kevin E.; Zwarenstein, Merrick; Oxman, Andrew D.; Treweek, Shaun; Furberg, Curt D.; Altman, Douglas G.; Tunis, Sean; Bergel, Eduardo; Harvey, Ian; Magid, David J.; Chalkidou, Kalipso (2009-05-01). "A pragmatic–explanatory continuum indicator summary (PRECIS): a tool to help trial designers". Journal of Clinical Epidemiology. 62 (5): 464–475. doi:10.1016/j.jclinepi.2008.12.011. ISSN 0895-4356. PMID 19348971.
- Halkidou, Kalipso; Gaughan, Luke; Cook, Susan; Leung, Hing Y.; Neal, David E.; Robson, Craig N. (2004). "Upregulation and Nuclear Recruitment of HDAC1 in Hormone Refractory Prostate Cancer". The Prostate. 59 (2): 177–189. doi:10.1002/pros.20022. ISSN 1097-0045. PMID 15042618. S2CID 25326296.
- Brownlee, Shannon; Chalkidou, Kalipso; Doust, Jenny; Elshaug, Adam G; Glasziou, Paul; Heath, Iona; Nagpal, Somil; Saini, Vikas; Srivastava, Divya; Chalmers, Kelsey; Korenstein, Deborah (2017-07-08). "Evidence for overuse of medical services around the world". The Lancet. 390 (10090): 156–168. doi:10.1016/S0140-6736(16)32585-5. ISSN 0140-6736. PMC 5708862. PMID 28077234.
