= Imperial College COVID-19 Response Team =

British crisis advisory group of scientists

- Formation: 2020
- Founded at: Imperial College London, Faculty of Medicine
- Headquarters: London, England
- Services: Reports relating to the COVID-19 pandemic to inform governments and public health agencies around the world
- Members: 50 scientists
- Leader: Professor Neil Ferguson
- Affiliations: MRC GIDA, Jameel Institute

The Imperial College COVID-19 Response Team is a group of experts from Imperial College London studying the COVID-19 pandemic and informing the government of the United Kingdom, and governments and public health agencies around the world. The team comprises scientists from the MRC Centre for Global Infectious Disease Analysis, the Jameel Institute, the Imperial College Business School and the Department of Mathematics. The Imperial College COVID-19 Response Team is led by Professor Neil Ferguson, Director of the Jameel Institute and MRC GIDA.

On 16 March 2020 the Imperial College COVID-19 Response Team produced a research forecast of various scenarios for spread of the disease in the United Kingdom and the United States. Without any mitigation their forecast showed local health care capabilities vastly overwhelmed by the epidemic wave. Periodic cycles of quarantine followed by softer social distancing were recommended, with quarantines in effect two-thirds of the time. On 30 March, a study on 11 European countries was published. It provided estimates of the situation as of 28 March (observed and modelised with CovidSim), and projections for 31 March given current expectations, no action, and the difference. It also provided a list of government policies and their respective absolute dates. As of 2 May 2021, the Imperial College COVID-19 Response Team has produced 43 reports.

== Reports ==
COVID-19 reports
Rank	Date	Title
43	2021-03-24	Quantifying the impact of vaccine hesitancy in prolonging the need for Non-Pharmaceutical Interventions to control the COVID-19 pandemic
42	2020-12-31	Transmission of SARS-CoV-2 Lineage B.1.1.7 in England: insights from linking epidemiological and genetic data
41	2020-12-22	The 2020 SARS-CoV-2 epidemic in England: key epidemiological drivers and impact of interventions
40	2020-12-10	Optimal scheduling rules for elective care to minimize years of life lost during the SARS-CoV-2 pandemic: an application to England
39	2020-12-01	Characterising COVID-19 epidemic dynamics and mortality under-ascertainment in Khartoum, Sudan
38	2020-11-27	SARS-CoV-2 setting-specific transmission rates: a systematic review and meta-analysis
37	2020-11-25	Children’s role in the COVID-19 pandemic: as systematic review of susceptibility, severity, and transmissibility
36	2020-11-16	Modelling ICU capacity under different epidemiological scenarios of the COVID-19 pandemic in three western European countries
35	2020-11-16	How can we keep schools and universities open? Differentiating closures by economic sector to optimize social and economic activity while containing SARS-CoV-2 transmission
34	2020-10-29	Infection Fatality Ratio Estimates from Seroprevalence
33	2020-09-25	Modelling the allocation and impact of a COVID-19 vaccine
32	2020-09-17	Age groups that sustain resurging COVID-19 epidemics in the United States
31	2020-09-15	Estimating under-ascertainment of COVID-19 mortality: an analysis of novel data sources to provide insight into COVID-19 dynamics in Damascus, Syria
30	2020-07-03	The COVID-19 epidemic trends and control measures in mainland China
29	2020-07-01	The impact of the COVID-19 epidemic on all-cause attendances to emergency departments in two large London hospitals: an observational study
28	2020-06-18	"Excess non-COVID-19 deaths in England and Wales between 29th February and 5th June 2020"
27	2020-06-15	Adapting hospital capacity to meet changing demands during the COVID-19 pandemic
26	2020-06-08	Reduction in mobility and COVID-19 transmission
25	2020-05-29	Response to COVID-19 in South Korea and implications for lifting stringent interventions
24	2020-05-29	Anonymised & aggregated crowd level mobility data from mobile phones suggests initial compliance with COVID19 social distancing interventions was high & geographically consistent across UK
23	2020-05-21	State-level tracking of COVID-19 in the United States
22	2020-05-12	Equity in response to the COVID-19 pandemic: an assessment of the direct and indirect impacts on disadvantaged and vulnerable populations in low- and lower middle-income countries
21	2020-05-08	Estimating COVID-19 cases and reproduction number in Brazil
20	2020-05-04	Using mobility to estimate the transmission intensity of COVID-19 in Italy: A subnational analysis with future scenarios
19	2020-05-01	The Potential Impact of the COVID-19 Epidemic on HIV, TB and Malaria in Low- and Middle-Income Countries
18	2020-05-01	The potential public health impact of COVID-19 on malaria in Africa
17	2020-04-29	Clinical characteristics and predictors of outcomes of hospitalised patients with COVID-19 in a London NHS Trust: a retrospective cohort study
16	2020-04-23	Role of testing in COVID-19 control
The report estimates COVID-19 testing's impact as reducing transmission by 25~33% from populations tested, but also allowing early release from quarantines and creation of Immunity passport based on antibody tests. Tests face technical, legal, and ethical challenges. Tests while helping are complementary to other more potent actions such as self-isolation when symptoms arises, contact tracing and quarantines.
15	2020-04-17	Strengthening hospital capacity for the COVID-19 pandemic
Reports presents the Jameel Institute pandemic planner "a hospital planning tool to calculate how much capacity in terms of beds, staff and ventilators is obtained by implementing healthcare provision interventions affecting the management of patient care in hospitals".
14	2020-04-03	Online Community Involvement in COVID-19 Research & Outbreak Response: Early Insights from a UK Perspective
13	2020-03-30	Estimating the number of infections and the impact of non-pharmaceutical interventions on COVID-19 in 11 European countries
12	2020-03-26	The global impact of COVID-19 and strategies for mitigation and suppression
11	2020-03-24	Evidence of initial success for China exiting COVID-19 social distancing policy after achieving containment
10	2020-03-20	Public response to UK Government recommendations on COVID-19: population survey, 17–18 March 2020
9	2020-03-16	Impact of non-pharmaceutical interventions (NPIs) to reduce COVID-19 mortality and healthcare demand
This report made an informed estimate of impact for both UK and the US, according to different strategies. The dire impact expressed helped convert the Johnson government from laisser-faire to mitigative strategies.
8	2020-03-11	Symptom progression of COVID-19
7	2020-03-09	Estimating infection prevalence in Wuhan City from repatriation flights
6	2020-02-21	Relative sensitivity of international surveillance
5	2020-02-15	Phylogenetic analysis of SARS-CoV-2
4	2020-02-10	Severity of 2019 novel coronavirus (nCoV)
3	2020-01-25	Transmissibility of 2019-nCoV
2	2020-01-22	Estimating the potential total number of novel Coronavirus (2019-nCoV) cases in Wuhan City, China
1	2020-01-17	Estimating the potential total number of novel Coronavirus (2019-nCoV) cases in Wuhan City, China

== Estimates ==
=== 11 European countries estimates on 28 March 2020 ===
Population infected by country
	ICCRT's model projection for 28 March			WHO lab-confirmed 29 March	
Country	Infected (95% range)	Infected (mean %)	Cases (est.)	Cases	Detected (% of pop.)
Austria	0.36%–3.1%	1.1%	99000	8291	0.09%
Belgium	1.3%–9.7%	3.7%	428400	9134	0.08%
Denmark	0.40%–3.1%	1.1%	63600	2201	0.04%
France	1.1%–7.4%	3.0%	1956800	37145	0.06%
Germany	0.28%–1.8%	0.72%	603300	52547	0.06%
Italy	3.2%–26%	9.8%	5928600	92472	0.15%
Norway	0.09%–1.2%	0.41%	22200	3845	0.07%
Spain	3.7%–41%	15%	7015100	72248	0.15%
Sweden	0.85%–8.4%	3.1%	312500	3447	0.03%
Switzerland	1.3%–7.6%	3.2%	276400	13152	0.15%
United Kingdom	1.2%–5.4%	2.7%	1830700	17093	0.03%
Note: WHO reporting laboratory-confirmed cases on 29 March, 10am Central European Time.

=== World estimates for 3 strategies ===
Estimated impact of suppression strategies over 250 days for 3 different strategies.
	Unmitigated Scenario		Suppression at 0.2 deaths/100,000/week		Suppression at 1.6 deaths/100,000/week	
	Infections	Deaths	Infections	Deaths	Infections	Deaths
East Asia & Pacific	2,117,131,000	15,303,000	92,544,000	442,000	632,619,000	3,315,000
Europe & Central Asia	801,770,000	7,276,000	61,578,000	279,000	257,706,000	1,397,000
Latin America & Caribbean	566,993,000	3,194,000	45,346,000	158,000	186,595,000	729,000
Middle East & North Africa	419,138,000	1,700,000	30,459,000	113,000	152,262,000	594,000
North America	326,079,000	2,981,000	17,730,000	92,000	90,529,000	520,000
South Asia	1,737,766,000	7,687,000	111,703,000	475,000	629,164,000	2,693,000
Sub-Saharan Africa	1,044,858,000	2,483,000	110,164,000	298,000	454,968,000	1,204,000
Total	7,013,734,000	40,624,000	469,523,000	1,858,000	2,403,843,000	10,452,000

== See also ==
- Non-pharmaceutical intervention (epidemiology)
- Jameel Institute
