= Lina Lazaar =

Tunisian art critic and curator (born 1983)

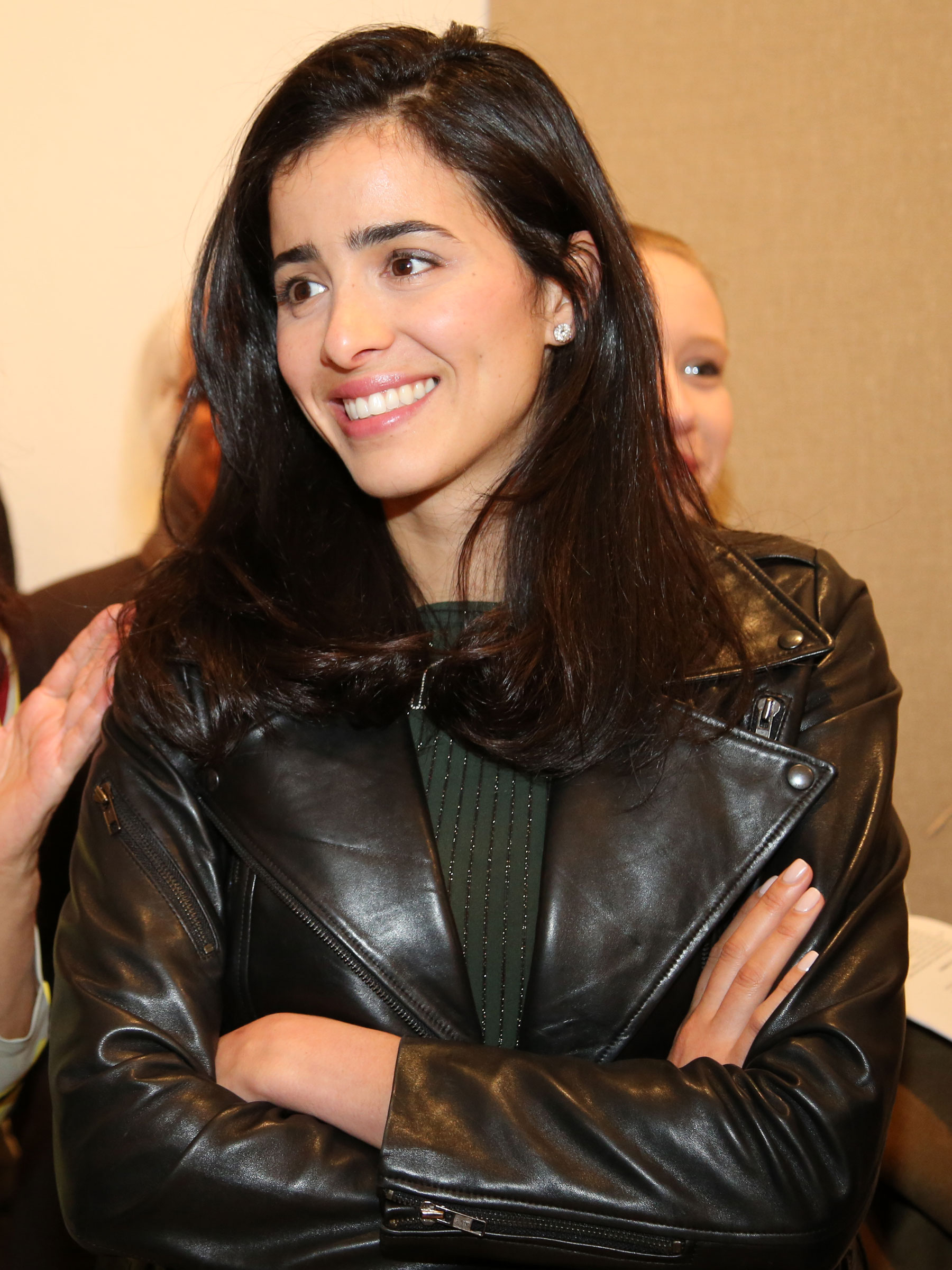
- Born: 1983 (age 42–43); Riyadh, Saudi Arabia
- Education: London School of Economics
- Occupation: Art historian

Lina Lazaar (born 1983) is a Tunisian art critic and curator. She has organised many major exhibitions dedicated to contemporary art in the MENA region. She represeented Tunisia in the 2017 Venice Biennale.

== Early life and education ==
Lazaar was born in Riyadh, Saudi Arabia and grew up in Geneva, Switzerland. She is the daughter of Kamel Lazaar, a Swiss-Tunisian financier, formerly senior executive at Citibank before founding the investment banking, private equity and asset management firm Swicorp.

She attended the London School of Economics (LSE). In 2006, she worked for Sotheby's, where she gained experience promoting contemporary artists from the MENA region.

== Career ==
During the 2010s, she continued her work promoting art from the MENA region. She launched the festival Jaou in 2013 and represented Tunisia in the 2017 Venice Biennale. More recently, she launched Ibraaz, in London, with her father Kamel Lazaar. Ibraaz hosts a publication, events and works of arts. It is supported by the Kamel Lazaar Foundation.

== Personal life ==
Lazaar was married to Saudi Arabian businessman Hassan Jameel in 2012 and divorced in 2017.
