= Ibraaz =

Online forum for visual culture in North Africa and the Middle East

- Editor-in-Chief: Anthony Downey
- Categories: Art magazines
- Frequency: Monthly
- Founder: Kamel Lazaar, Lina Lazaar, Anthony Downey
- Founded: 2011
- Country: UK
- Based in: London
- Language: English/Arabic
- Website: www.ibraaz.org

Ibraaz is an online forum for visual culture in North Africa and the Middle East.

== Publication ==
Ibraaz publishes an annual online platform that focuses on research questions conceived through a network of editorial contributors based in the Middle East and beyond. Its key editorial aim is to publish emerging writers and artists, alongside work by internationally renowned writers, academics, curators, activists, and filmmakers.

Ibraaz works by posing annual ‘platforms’ where a question is put to writers, thinkers and artists about an issue relevant to the MENA region. This platform is sent to respondents both within and beyond the MENA region. Content is added to the website every month. Contributions are archived every twelve months when a new platform begins.

Ibraaz also publishes a series of books, edited by Anthony Downey, under the 'Visual Culture in the Middle East' title. To date, these have included Future Imperfect: Contemporary Art Practices and Cultural Institutions in the Middle East (Sternberg Press, 2016); Dissonant Archives: Contemporary Visual Culture and Contested Narratives in the Middle East (I.B. Tauris, 2015); and Uncommon Grounds: New Media and Critical Practices in North Africa and the Middle East (I.B. Tauris, 2014).

== History ==
Ibraaz was set up from discussions between Anthony Downey, Kamel Lazaar and Lina Lazaar. It was founded as a research platform to rethink stereotypical frames of reference that have defined discussions around cultural production from within and beyond the Middle East. The inaugural platform was launched as part of the 54th Venice Biennale in June 2011, alongside the exhibition The Future of a Promise, the largest Pan-Arab exhibition to be held at the Venice Biennale. Ibraaz Platform 001 responded to regional developments across North Africa and the Middle East, the so-called ‘Arab Spring’ and its effects upon the visual culture of the region. Ibraaz is an initiative of the Kamel Lazaar Foundation.

== Scope of coverage and activities ==
Ibraaz’s content covers mostly contemporary visual culture from or about the Middle East and its diaspora. However, it can also include non-visual culture, such as sound-based art, and other periods, such as Modern art. The content consists of essays, interviews, reviews, artists' projects, platform responses and video contributions in its online channel.

In addition to the online platform and publications, Ibraaz organize and co-host events relating to visual culture in the Middle East. These include book launches, panel discussions and the annual Jaou Tunis conference. In 2013, Ibraaz held the conference Future Imperfect: Cultural Propositions and Global Perspectives at Tate Modern, London. The event featured contributors including Douglas Coupland, Raqs Media Collective, Joana Hadjithomas & Khalil Joreige, Zineb Sedira, and others.

Ibraaz periodically collaborates with a range of international artists and organisations, frequently publishing online exhibition catalogues and audiovisual content. Such partnerships have included with Asia Contemporary Art Week's FIELD MEETING Take 4: Thinking Practice, held at the Solomon R. Guggenheim Museum and Asia Society, New York City, USA in 2016; the Palestinian biennial Qalandiya International; the Delfina Foundation, London; Hayward Gallery, London, and Maraya Art Center, Sharjah; and The Jerusalem Show, Jerusalem.

== Contributors ==
Notable contributors to Ibraaz include:

- Lawrence Abu Hamdan
- John Akomfrah
- Wafaa Bilal
- Shezad Dawood
- Okwui Enwezor
- Monir Shahroudy Farmanfarmaian
- Coco Fusco
- Joy Garnett
- Hans Haacke
- Mona Hatoum
- Emily Jacir
- Gulf Labor
- Walter D. Mignolo
- Michael Rakowitz
- Beatrix Ruf
- Hassan Sharif
- Wael Shawky
- Adam Szymczyk
- Ala Younis
