= Kamel Lazaar =

Tunisian-Swiss investment banker (born 1952)

- Born: July 10, 1952 (age 74)
- Education: Tunis University, B.A, Higher Institute of Management of Tunis (Institut Supérieur de Gestion de Tunis) Tunis University, MBA
- Occupations: Founder and Chairman of Swicorp, Founder and President of the Kamel Lazaar Foundation (KLF)
- Spouse(s): Soumaya Lazaar, 1980-2009
- Children: Lina Lazaar, Rayan Lazaar and Bashar Lazaar from his marriage with Mrs. Soumaya Lazaar and Yara Lazaar from the relationship with his second life partner

Kamel Lazaar (born July 10, 1952) is a Tunisian-Swiss investment banker, serial entrepreneur and philanthropist active across the MENA region. He is the founder and chairman of Swicorp, an investment banking, private equity (PE) and asset management firm headquartered in Riyadh, and former Vice-President of Citibank in Saudi Arabia (at the very beginning of his career). He is known for innovative initiatives in the following fields: business, public policy, art and culture.

== Education ==
Kamel Lazaar holds a Master of Business Administration in Finance from the Higher Institute of Management of Tunis (Institut Supérieur de Gestion de Tunis) and a Bachelor of Arts in Economics from the University of Tunis.

== Career ==
Kamel started his career at Citibank in North Africa, Europe and Saudi Arabia and was part of the Saudi American Bank’s (Samba (bank)) founding team.

In 1987, Kamel founded one of the first investment banks in MENA: Swicorp. Today, Swicorp is present in Riyadh, Tunis, Dubai and Geneva. The company handles assets in excess of 1 billion dollars and executes multi-billion corporate finance and asset management deals across the region.

In 2011, he founded the Maghreb Economic Forum (MEF) as an independent, non-partisan think-and-do tank. MEF is an NGO engaging a conversation between public and private audiences and nurturing new solutions for Education, Employment, Leadership & Gender Equality.

== Philanthropy ==
Together with his daughter Lina Lazaar, Kamel handles most of his philanthropic work through the Kamel Lazaar Foundation (KLF), which he created in 2005 in an effort to consolidate his interest in visual art and heritage preservation. The backbone of the Kamel Lazaar Foundation is one of the largest contemporary and modern art collections in the MENA region. In 2011, KLF initiated the launch of the online magazine and platform Ibraaz- the largest forum for critical exchange on visual culture in the MENA region, followed shortly by the first instalment of Jaou – which became an annual event bringing together artists, thinkers and change-makers to exhibit works of art and fostering a dialogue about contemporary creative practices in the region. KLF contributed to bringing Tunisia back to the Biennale di Venezia after an absence of nearly six decades.
