= Robin Shattock =

Professor at Imperial College London

Robin Shattock FMedSci
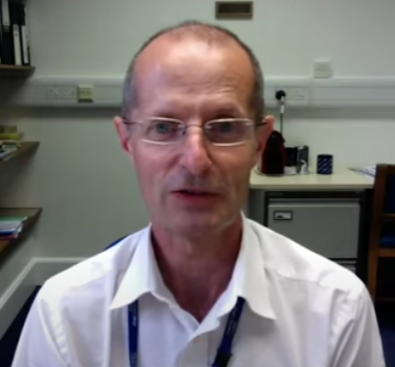
- Born: Robin John Shattock; February 1963 (age 63)
- Scientific career
- Fields: Mucosal Infection; Immunology
- Workplaces: Imperial College London
- Website: www.imperial.ac.uk/people/r.shattock

Robin John Shattock (born February 1963) is a British immunologist who is professor of mucosal infection and immunity at the Faculty of Medicine, Imperial College London.

== Education and early life ==
Shattock attended Lancing College, where he was initially more interested in acting and music than science.

== Career and research ==
During the COVID-19 pandemic, Shattock led the British initiative to develop a vaccine for the disease at Imperial. He estimated in February 2020 that the vaccine for the disease would be available by early 2021.

=== Awards and honours ===
Shattock was elected a Fellow of the Academy of Medical Sciences (FMedSci) in 2017.
