= Hauck Auditorium =

Hauck Auditorium may refer to:

- an auditorium on the University of Maine campus, named for their ninth president Arthur Hauck
- an auditorium on the Stanford University campus, named for philanthropist Everett Hauck, inside the David and Joan Traitel Building, home to the Hoover Institution.
