= Katharina Hauck =

British economist and academic

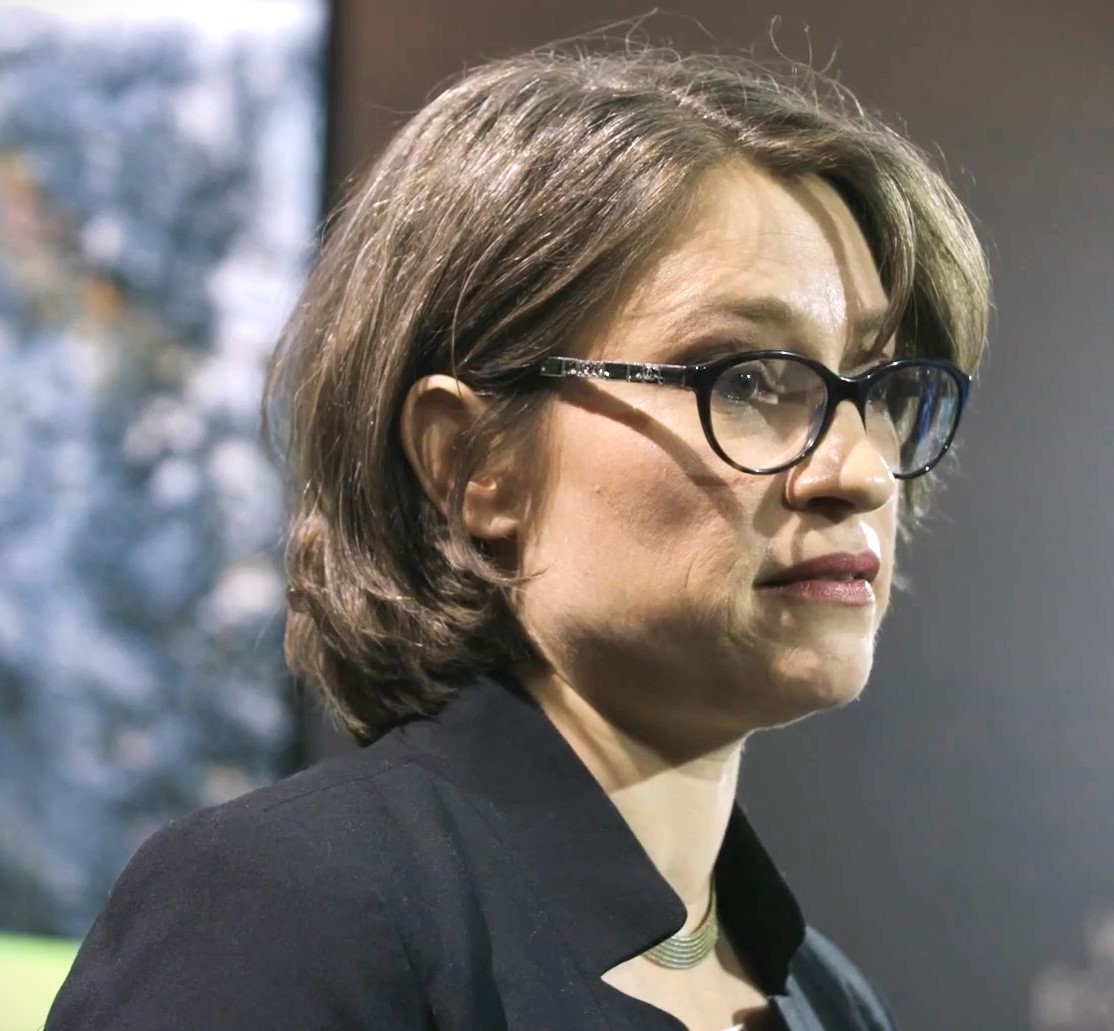
- Hauck speaks at the World Economic Forum in 2017
- Education: University of York
- Scientific career
- Workplaces: Imperial College Business School; Imperial College London; Monash University
- Thesis: A quantitative analysis of health and health care organisations (2004)

Katharina Hauck is a British economist who is a professor and deputy director of the Abdul Latif Jameel Institute for Disease and Emergency Analytics at Imperial College London. Her research concentrates on the economics of infectious diseases and how public health interventions and pandemic preparedness impact economies.

== Education ==
Hauck was a doctoral researcher in the Centre for Health Economics at the University of York. Her doctoral research involved a quantitative analysis of health and health care organisations. She spent part of her graduate studies at the World Health Organization.

== Research and career ==
In 2005, Hauck joined the Department of Econometrics and Business Statistics at Monash University. In 2010, she moved to the Imperial College Business School, and in 2015 she joined the School of Public Health. At Imperial College London, Hauck established the Jameel Institute-Kenneth C. Griffin Initiative for the Economics of Pandemic Preparedness. The Jameel Institute look to understand the societal and economic value of preparing for pandemics.

Hauck had studied the economics of infectious diseases and pandemic preparedness. She evaluated HPTN 071 (PopART), a cluster randomised trial of antiretroviral therapies for treating HIV in Zambia and South Africa. She found that universal HIV testing and treatment was cost-effective in high prevalence settings. Hauck led the economic analysis for the Infected Blood Inquiry. She found that the infections had broad-reaching financial impacts; affected individuals could not work, their children's education was interrupted, and their loved ones often became carers.

Hauck is an international advisor on health policy and pandemic preparedness. She has worked with the World Health Organization, G20, the Coalition for Epidemic Preparedness Innovations, Cabinet Office and the Global Fund.

== Selected publications ==
- Anurag Sharma; Katharina Hauck; Bruce P. Hollingsworth; Luigi Siciliani (4 June 2014). "The effects of taxing sugar-sweetened beverages across different income groups". Health Economics. 23 (9): 1159–1184. doi:10.1002/hec.3070. ISSN 1057-9230. PMID 24895084. Wikidata Q45893822.
- Maria Goddard; Katharina Hauck; Peter C Smith (1 January 2006). "Priority setting in health - a political economy perspective". Health Economics, Policy and Law. 1 (Pt 1): 79–90. doi:10.1017/s1744133105001040. ISSN 1744-1331. PMID 18634704. Wikidata Q58623088.
- Katharina Hauck; Nigel Rice (1 October 2004). "A longitudinal analysis of mental health mobility in Britain". Health Economics. 13 (10): 981–1001. doi:10.1002/hec.939. ISSN 1057-9230. PMID 15386686. Wikidata Q51937170.
