= Institute for Health Metrics and Evaluation COVID model =

Infectious disease model

The Institute for Health Metrics and Evaluation COVID model (IHME model), also called the "Chris Murray model" after the IHME director, is an epidemiological model for COVID-19 pandemic developed at the Institute for Health Metrics and Evaluation at the University of Washington in Seattle. In April 2020, the model was called "perhaps the most widely cited coronavirus model" by The Colorado Sun and "America's most influential coronavirus model" by The Washington Post. Its projections were cited during White House briefings in March–April 2020.

Critics say the model uses flawed methods and should not guide U.S. policies. For example, an inappropriate distributional assumption resulted in the model predicting Covid fatalities in New York would certainly fall to zero in New York by late Spring, 2020.

In late April 2020, the IHME published estimates of when states could relax social distancing measures and begin to reopen their economies in relative safety, using data from the model.

== See also ==
- List of COVID-19 simulation models
