= Abdul Latif Jameel =

Saudi company

Abdul Latif Jameel Company Ltd
- Type: Private
- Incorporated: 1945
- Founded: 1945
- Founder: Abdul Latif Jameel
- Headquarters: Jeddah, Saudi Arabia
- Number of locations: Over 30 markets worldwide.
- Area served: Worldwide
- Key people: Mohammed Abdul Latif Jameel (Chairman); Fady M. Jameel (Vice Chairman, International); Hassan Jameel (Vice Chairman, Saudi Arabia)
- Services: Transportation: Passenger vehicles; Commercial vehicles & equipment; Logistics; Engineering; Manufacturing; Funding; Land and Real Estate; Energy and Environmental; Consumer Products; Advertising media
- Number of employees: 11,000+
- Website: www.alj.com

Abdul Latif Jameel is a family-owned, diversified business founded in Saudi Arabia in 1945 by the late Sheikh Abdul Latif Jameel. Operating across seven core business sectors, the company has a presence in more than 30 countries across six continents.

== History ==
1940s–60s

Abdul Latif Jameel was founded in Jeddah, Saudi Arabia, in 1945 by Sheikh Abdul Latif Jameel. The company became a Toyota distributor in the Kingdom in 1955.

1970s–2000s

In 1979, the Abdul Latif Jameel United Finance Company (ALJUF) was established.

In 1996, Abdul Latif Jameel established a general trading company in Japan, which now operates an experiential open business center in Tokyo.

The company also established a Toyota distributorship in Turkey.

2010s–present day

In 2013, Abdul Latif Jameel and Sumitomo Corporation formed a joint venture, now known as Abdul Latif Jameel Machinery, to distribute Komatsu heavy equipment in Saudi Arabia.

In 2013, King Abdullah Economic City (KAEC) and Abdul Latif Jameel signed an agreement for the purchase of 1.5 million square meters of land in KAEC’s Industrial Valley. The company committed to investing SR 1.2 billion to build a complex for the import, distribution, component manufacturing, and assembly of cars. The following year, Abdul Latif Jameel signed a joint venture Memorandum of Agreement (MoA) with Dubai-based regional property developer Emaar Properties.

In 2014, Abdul Latif Jameel entered into a joint venture with the Spain-based company Fotowatio Renewable Ventures (FRV) and subsequently acquired FRV in 2015.

In May 2016, Abdul Latif Jameel launched the first Lexus brand distributorship in Turkey. In the same year, the company announced its plan to invest US$2.2 billion in Saudi Arabia over the next five years as part of its long-term expansion strategy. This included expanding the Toyota outlet network, opening a Lexus showroom in Riyadh, and establishing a new flagship Komatsu facility in Jeddah. Additionally, in 2016, Abdul Latif Jameel Land began construction of J│ONE Residences, its first residential project in Jeddah, Saudi Arabia.

At the World Future Energy Summit 2017 in Abu Dhabi, Abdul Latif Jameel Energy announced the launch of Almar Water Solutions. In the same year, Abdul Latif Jameel Energy began construction on two of the largest solar projects in Jordan, known as Mafraq I and Mafraq II. These projects are expected to generate approximately 2% of Jordan's total energy capacity. Additionally, in 2017, the company's electronics division was rebranded and relaunched as Redsea.

In April 2018, Abdul Latif Jameel Land launched J|ONE Residences. In October, the company established the first Lexus showroom in Morocco, unveiling it at the Auto Expo 2018 in Casablanca. Later that year, Abdul Latif Jameel Energy announced its first large-scale solar project in India: the 138-MW DC Solar Farm in Andhra Pradesh. Additionally, Abdul Latif Jameel Machinery formed a strategic partnership with Kanoo Machinery.

In 2019, Abdul Latif Jameel Energy established a wind energy project in Japan. Supported by regional power companies Hokkaido Electric Power Company and Tohoku Electric Power Co., Inc., Abdul Latif Jameel Energy launched its first micro wind turbines at Cape Erimo, Japan’s "Wind Town." In the same year, Abdul Latif Jameel Land and the Al Muhaidib Group partnered to launch a new joint venture, Muheel, an Integrated Facilities Management (IFM) company in Saudi Arabia. Additionally, Abdul Latif Jameel Logistics launched an express delivery service and e-commerce brand, S:mile.

In April 2019, Abdul Latif Jameel Motors was awarded the Gold Award for Business Transformation for its JSAP program at the annual SAP Quality Awards, presented at a ceremony in Heidelberg, Germany. In the same year, Almar Water Solutions, part of Abdul Latif Jameel Energy, secured a contract to develop a desalination plant in the city of Shuqaiq, located on the Red Sea coast of Saudi Arabia.

In November 2021, it was reported that Abdul Latif Jameel's investment unit had accumulated nearly 114 million shares in Rivian, valued at almost $11.5 billion on the closing day of Rivian's IPO.

In September 2022, the company was ranked seventh in Forbes' list of the Middle East's Top 100 Arab Family Businesses.

In April 2025, Jameel Motors announced its entry into the Polish market through an agreement to become the importer and exclusive distributor of GAC vehicles. The initial launch in September 2025 featured the Aion V and Hyptec HT. By August 2026, the Polish range comprised the Aion V, Hyptec HT, Aion UT, Emkoo and Emzoom.

== Management ==
The founder, Abdul Latif Jameel, ran the company from its formation until his death in 1993, after which his son, Mohammed Abdul Latif Jameel, became Chairman. Mohammed's eldest son, Fady Mohammed Abdul Latif Jameel, serves as Vice Chairman, International. Mohammed Jameel's middle son, Hassan Jameel, serves as Vice Chairman of the company's operations in Saudi Arabia.

== Subsidiaries ==
Abdul Latif Jameel Enterprises: The diversification arm in Saudi Arabia.
