= Priority-setting in global health =

Decision-making process

In global health, priority-setting is a term used for the process and strategy of deciding which health interventions to carry out. Priority-setting can be conducted at the disease level (i.e. deciding which disease to alleviate), the overall strategy level (i.e. selective primary healthcare versus primary healthcare versus more general health systems strengthening), research level (i.e. which health research to carry out), or other levels.

== Definitions ==
Priority-setting is the act of deciding which health interventions to carry out, and can occur at several levels of granularity. Priority-setting can occur at the following levels:

- health budget level (i.e. deciding how much to spend on health overall)
- overall strategy level (i.e. selective primary healthcare versus primary healthcare versus more general health systems strengthening)
- disease level (i.e. deciding which disease to alleviate)
- intervention level within each disease (i.e. restricting to a specific disease and prioritizing among interventions for that disease)
- drug level
- research level (i.e. which health research to carry out)

Synonymous terms include "prioritization in health care and health research", "priority determination", "health priorities", and "agenda-setting".

== Metrics ==
Various metrics have been used to compare interventions. These include:

- Disability-adjusted life year per unit cost (used by e.g. Disease Control Priorities Project), quality-adjusted life year, and other forms of cost-effectiveness analysis
- Reasons that the disease burden has persisted
- Adequacy of funding

== Who sets the priorities? ==
Priority-setting can be done by various actors. These include:

- Governments: "In most countries, health spending by governments vastly outpaces international health aid, so governments set most health priorities."
- Non-profits and companies that assist governments
- If a country is using a Health in All Policy (HiAP) approach, then priority-setting is done by stakeholders who do not directly deal with health.
- International organizations
- Foundations
- Private donors (including high-net-worth individuals and ultra-high-net-worth individuals): "A common outcome is a negotiated set of priorities that reflect some domestic needs and some technical, political, and economic considerations defined largely by the interests of donors." In some highly aid-dependent countries, donors "have huge influence on health priorities".

According to Devi Sridhar, professor of global health at the University of Edinburgh, "the priorities of funding bodies largely dictate what health issues and diseases are studied".

Usually at a level of equity and are done by decision-makers closely working alongside marginalized communities and people being influenced. Stakeholder engagement involvements is critical in priority-settings as it establishes if the decisions made by the various actors reflect what the population needs as well as if they are appropriate and accurate. Priority setting decision-makers often make it a point to not only provide assistance and resources but to also give voices to those who are often unheard and invisible in the privileged system. Oftentimes, these priorities address more than just socioeconomic status but also inequalities such as gender, race, and religion inequalities. Policies take a long time to process because of how specific they tend to be.

Once a consensus has been reached between the priority setting makers and the communities, there might be challenges and problems that could arise based on the health intervention being pushed by the priority. Due to the complexity of the inequalities, aspects such as the levels of population health and the distribution of health are being considered which could also be looked at through economical lenses. Although decision makers have the power to constraint and provide aid, there also tends to be an asymmetric information as health organizations might overestimate which priorities are desired.

== History of organizations and programs working on priority-setting ==
Global-level priority-setting has occurred since at least the 1980s, though these efforts have only focused on a few aspects.

The following table is a timeline of organizations and programs working on priority-setting.

Years active	Event	Level at which prioritization occurred	Metric or methods used	Operating costs/funding level (in US$)	Results and impact
1977–present	WHO Model List of Essential Medicines is published.	Among medicines			Produced explicit list of medicines. As of 2016, at least 156 countries have created national lists of essential medicines based on the WHO's model list.
1984	Demographic and Health Surveys is conceived.	Improving data quality		380,000,000 (from USAID as of 2011)	Data from the DHS has been analyzed by various papers.
1987–1989	The Oregon Health Services Commission (HSC) is established to prioritize within the US Medicaid program. The HSC would publish their first prioritized list of health services in 1993. The HSC would be abolished in 2012.	Health services	Originally a cost-per-utility formula, but then expert judgment and a method of splitting health services into categories and ranking within categories		"This time greater emphasis is placed on preventive services and chronic disease management, reflecting the fact that providing health care before reaching crisis mode will prevent avoidable morbidity and mortality."
1987–1990	Commission on Health Research for Development is established in 1987 and would publish Health Research: Essential Link to Equity in Development in 1990.	Research	Meetings with experts		Produced several reports, including the final report, Health Research: Essential Link to Equity in Development. Resulted in the establishment of the Council on Health Research for Development (COHRED) to promote priority-setting in low- and middle-income countries.
?	Essential National Health Research				
1993	Disease Control Priorities in Developing Countries is published by the Disease Control Priorities Project.		Disability-adjusted life year		
1993	The World Bank publishes the 1993 World Development Report.	Health interventions	Disability-adjusted life year		
1994	World Health Organization's Ad Hoc Committee on Health Research Relating to Future Intervention Options (AHC)	Research and development			Produced the 1996 report "Investing in Health Research and Development".
1995	Multiple Indicator Cluster Surveys	Improving data quality			
1998	WHO-CHOICE, a program that helps countries choose health system priorities, is developed.				
1998	Global Forum for Health Research	Research and development	Structured interviews and literature review		Produced a list of 17 priorities.
2000	Council on Health Research and Development		Review of previous efforts		
2001	Center for Global Development				
2002	Marginal budgeting for bottlenecks (the World Bank, UNICEF, and WHO) is conceived.				
2003	The Bill & Melinda Gates Foundation announces the Grand Challenges in Global Health, for which it initially provides $200 million in funding.	Research and development	Scientific board	550,000,000 (from the Gates Foundation as of 2008; smaller amounts from others not yet included)	Out of more than 1000 submissions, 14 were selected by the scientific board as "grand challenges".
2003	The initial version of the Lives Saved Tool (LiST) by Johns Hopkins University is created.				
2004	Global Forum for Health Research develops the "Combined Approach Matrix" (CAM).	Various (since CAM is a general method)	CAM itself is the method, but takes into account disease burden, present level of knowledge, cost-effectiveness, macro-economic policies, etc.		Rudan et al.: "The tool has proven to be highly useful for systematic classification, organization, and presentation of the large body of information that is needed at different stages of priority setting process, so that the decisions made by the members of decision-making committees could be based on all relevant and available information, rather than their own personal knowledge and judgment."
2004	The Copenhagen Consensus (which focuses on aid and development in general, and not just global health) holds its first conference.				
2005	Health Metrics Network launches. The partnership would dissolve in 2013.	Improving data quality		50,000,000 (initially, by the Gates Foundation; see Health Metrics Network § Funding for more)	Various
2006	Second edition of Disease Control Priorities in Developing Countries by the Disease Control Priorities Project is published.				
2007	The Lancet publishes a series of papers on priorities in international health.	Research	Delphi method		
2007	Health Intervention and Technology Assessment Program is established.	Various			
2007	Institute for Health Metrics and Evaluation launches.	Improving data quality, burden of disease		105,000,000 (initial grant, mainly from the Gates Foundation)	
2008	Supporting Independent Immunization and Vaccine Advisory Committees Initiative (SIVAC) is founded.	Among vaccines			
2009	EVIDEM Collaboration (Evidence and Value: Impact on Decision Making) is established.	Health interventions	Literature review, "discussions with stakeholders", and multicriteria decision analysis (MCDA)		
2013	International Decision Support Initiative launches as the result of a Center for Global Development working group.	Health interventions		12,800,000 (from the Bill & Melinda Gates Foundation for phase 2 of operations)	

== Reception ==
The result of a myriad of actors championing a kaleidoscope of "priorities" is confusion. Advocates, researchers, and policy makers have labeled almost every disease, condition, medication, or intervention a "health priority."

— Glassman et al.

Rudan et al. says that priority-setting efforts have relied on "consensus reached by panels of experts" and as a result have not been systematic enough, and that this has "often made it difficult to present the identified priorities to wider audiences as legitimate and fair".

Glassman et al. notes that criticisms of priority-setting include "the weak data on which estimates of burden, cost, and effectiveness relied; the value judgments implicit in disability-adjusted life year age weighting and discounting decisions; and treatment of equity issues, as well as the political difficulties associated with translating a ground zero package into a public budget based on historical inputs"; and the consideration of only health maximization at the expense of other objectives such as fairness.

Glassman et al. also notes how there are more cost-effectiveness studies for LMICs (in the thousands), but that these are unlikely to be actually applied to priority-setting processes.

Jeremy Shiffman has said that some bodies such as the Institute for Health Metrics and Evaluation and The Lancet are prominent in priority-setting due to their dominion rather than data and analysis, and also notes that the process of creating the Sustainable Development Goals was not sufficiently transparent.

== See also ==
- Timeline of global health
- Effective altruism
- Cost-benefit analysis
- Global Burden of Disease Study
- 10/90 gap
- Health economics
- Health care rationing
- Impact evaluation
- Impact assessment
- Open Philanthropy Project, which does broader prioritization work
