= Health administration =

Field relating to administration of hospitals

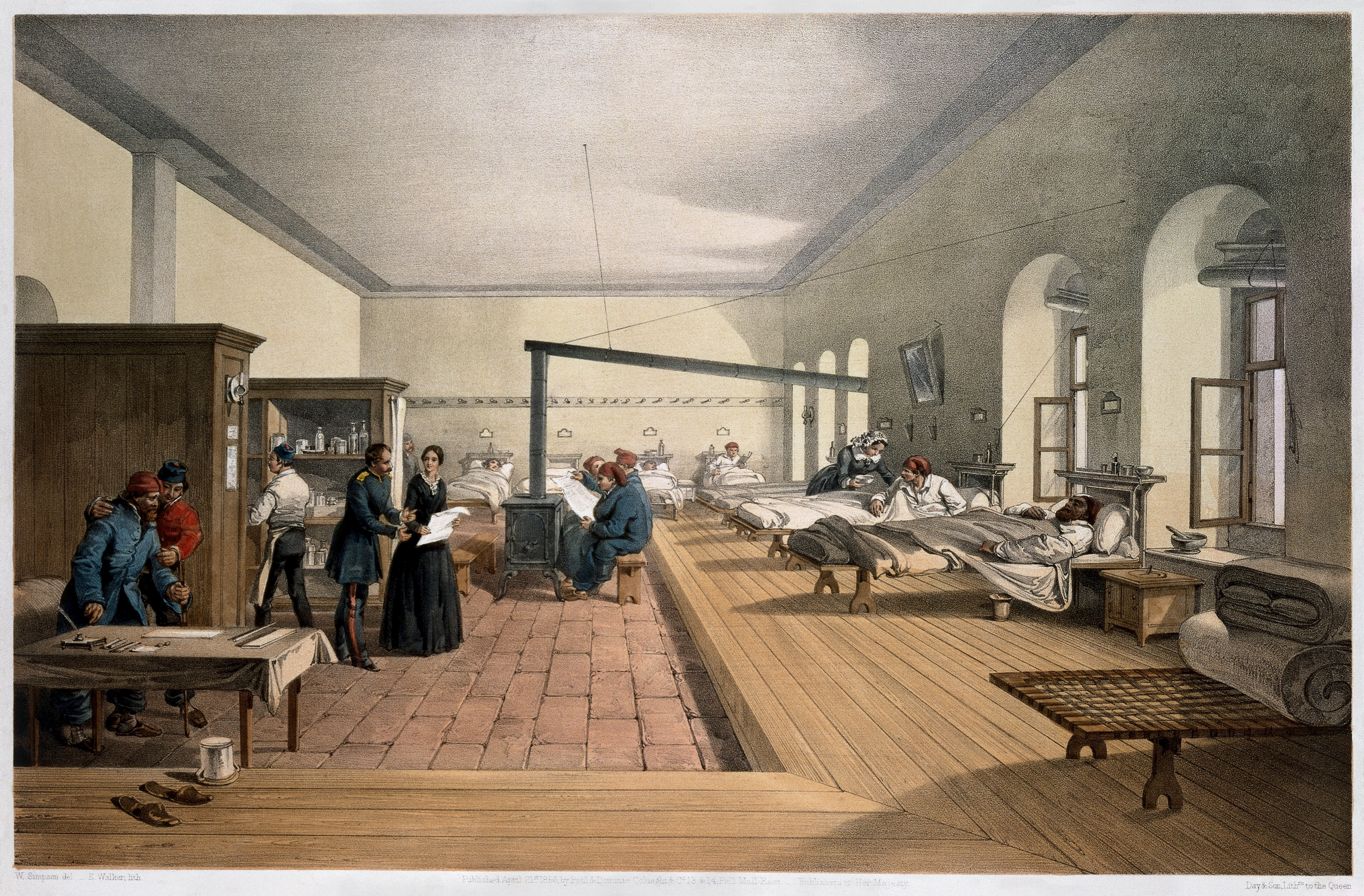
Iconographic Collections. Keywords: E. Walker; Florence Nightingale; W.J. Simpson

Health administration, healthcare administration, healthcare management, health services management or hospital management is the field relating to leadership, management, and administration of public health systems, health care systems, hospitals, and hospital networks in all the primary, secondary, and tertiary sectors.

== Terminology ==
Health systems management or health care systems management describes the leadership and general management of hospitals, hospital networks, and/or health care systems. In international use, the term refers to management at all levels. In the United States, management of a single institution (e.g. a hospital) is also referred to as "medical and health services management", "healthcare management", or "health administration".

Health systems management ensures that specific outcomes are attained that departments within a health facility are running smoothly that the right people are in the right jobs, that people know what is expected of them, that resources are used efficiently and that all departments are working towards a common goal for mutual development and growth.

== Hospital administrators ==
Hospital administrators are individuals or groups of people who act as the central point of control within hospitals. These individuals may be previous or current clinicians, or individuals with other healthcare backgrounds. There are two types of administrators, generalists and specialists. Generalists are individuals who are responsible for managing or helping to manage an entire facility. Specialists are individuals who are responsible for the efficient and effective operations of a specific department such as policy analysis, finance, accounting, budgeting, human resources, or marketing.

It was reported in September 2014, that the United States spends roughly $218 billion per year on hospital's administration costs, which is equivalent to 1.43 percent of the total U.S. economy. Hospital administration has grown as a percent of the U.S. economy from .9 percent in 2000 to 1.43 percent in 2012, according to Health Affairs. In 11 countries, hospitals allocate approximately 12 percent of their budget toward administrative costs. In the United States, hospitals spend 25 percent on administrative costs.

=== Competencies ===
NCHL competencies that require to engage with credibility, creativity, and motivation in complex and dynamic health care environments.

- Accountability
- Achievement orientation
- Change leadership
- Collaboration
- Communication skills
- Financial skills
- Impact and influence
- Innovative thinking
- Organizational awareness
- Professionalism
- Self-confidence
- Strategic orientation
- Talent development
- Team leadership

== Training and organizations ==
=== Associated qualifications ===
Health care management is usually studied through healthcare administration or healthcare management programs in a business school or, in some institutions, in a school of public health.

==== North America ====
Although many colleges and universities are offering a bachelor's degree in healthcare administration or human resources, a master's degree is considered the "standard credential" for most health administrators in the United States. Research and academic-based doctorate level degrees, such as the Doctor of Philosophy (PhD) in Health Administration and the Doctor of Health Administration (DHA) degree, prepare health care professionals to turn their clinical or administrative experiences into opportunities to develop new knowledge and practice, teach, shape public policy and/or lead complex organizations. There are multiple recognized degree types that are considered equivalent from the perspective of professional preparation.

The Commission on the Accreditation of Healthcare Management Education (CAHME) is the accrediting body overseeing master's-level programs in the United States and Canada on behalf of the United States Department of Education. It accredits several degree program types, including Master of Hospital Administration (MHA), Master of Health Services Administration (MHSA), Master of Business Administration in Hospital Management (MBA-HM), Master of Health Administration (MHA), Master of Public Health (MPH, MSPH, MSHPM), Master of Science (MS-HSM, MS-HA), and Master of Public Administration (MPA).(Master of Hospital Management) (MHM)

=== Professional organizations ===
There are a variety of different professional associations related to health systems management, which can be subcategorized as either personal or institutional membership groups. Personal membership groups are joined by individuals, and typically have individual skills and career development as their focus. Larger personal membership groups include the Healthcare Financial Management Association and the Healthcare Information and Management Systems Society. Institutional membership groups are joined by organizations; whereas they typically focus on organizational effectiveness, and may also include data sharing agreements and other medical related or administrative practice sharing vehicles for member organizations. Prominent examples include the American Hospital Association and the University Healthsystems Consortium.

== System processes ==
A career in healthcare administration consists of organizing, developing, and managing medical and health services. These responsibilities are carried out at hospitals, clinics, managed care companies, public health agencies, and other comparable establishments. This job involves a lot of paperwork and minimal clinical engagement. Healthcare administrators make sure to promote excellence in patient care, patient satisfaction, and relationships with their physicians. In order to do this they must make sure that their employees are willing to follow protocols and keep a positive attitude with their patients. The entire organization has a better experience when everything is organized and protocols are set into place. The dual role of physicians follows as both consumers of healthcare resources and controllers of organizational revenue with their ability to direct patients and prescribe care. This makes leader relationships with physicians fairly atypical in comparison with key stakeholder relationships in other industries. Healthcare administrators might become overworked along with physicians feeling stressed from various protocols. However, both the parties of stakeholders and patients make up the backbone of a proper healthcare administration. These administrators make sure that the doctors, insurance companies, patients, and other healthcare providers have access to the files they need to provide appropriate treatments. Multiple hierarchies of professionals, on both the clinical and administrative sides of the organization, generate special challenges for directing and coordinating the healthcare organization. A healthcare administrator has a long-term effect in improving the hospital's process operation systems. They play a vital role in the sustainability of the institution.

=== Funding of hospitals ===
Healthcare administrators are in charge of hospital finances and advocate various strategies to improve their facilities and resources. Hospitals provide funding for assets like marketing, charity events, equipment, medicine, payroll, etc. At the same time, an institution should not be all things to people; it has its own limitations. The management administration carefully manages these funds due to a spending limitation. The healthcare administrators control the expenditures that the hospital allows in order to meet profits. Sometimes hospitals are limited on what they can do for patients. Administrators that run these hospitals strive to achieve goals within their financial limitations. This study examines the causes of healthcare employment growth and workforce composition in the US and evaluates the labor market's impact on healthcare spending and health outcomes. When healthcare spending reduces, employment growth will start reducing as well. The healthcare administration is critical to the lives of the people in hospitals. It contributes to cost saving practices and making sure that the necessities are brought to the institution. Healthcare management makes sure that protocols and funds are properly organized for each department. They are responsible for keeping the healthcare industry afloat.

== Research ==
Health policy and systems research (HPSR) is a field of inquiry that studies "how societies organize themselves in achieving collective health goals, and how different actors interact in the policy and implementation processes to contribute to policy outcomes". HPSR is interdisciplinary and brings together expertise in a variety of biomedical and social sciences such as economics, sociology, anthropology, political science, public health and epidemiology.

The Commission on Health Research for Development and the Ad Hoc Committee on Health Research both highlighted the urgent need for focusing research methods, funding and practice towards addressing health inequities and embracing inter-disciplinary and intersectoral thinking. These reports and other academic and activist voices linked to them argued for greater voice and participation of developing countries in defining research priorities. Since then creation of the Alliance for Health Policy and Systems Research in 2000 and that of Health Systems Global in 2012 have consolidated the practice community of HPSR.

== History ==
Early hospital administrators were called patient directors or superintendents. At the time, many were nurses who had taken on administrative responsibilities. Over half of the members of the American Hospital Association were graduate nurses in 1916. Other superintendents were medical doctors, laymen and members of the clergy. In the United States, the first degree granting program in the United States was established at Marquette University in Milwaukee, Wisconsin. By 1927, the first two students received their degrees. The original idea is credited to Father Moulinier, associated with the Catholic Hospital Association. The first modern health systems management program was established in 1934 at the University of Chicago. At the time, programs were completed in two years – one year of formal graduate study and one year of practicing internship. In 1958, the Sloan program at Cornell University began offering a special program requiring two years of formal study, which remains the dominant structure in the United States and Canada today (see also "Academic Preparation").

Health systems management has been described as a "hidden" health profession because of the relatively low-profile role managers take in health systems, in comparison to direct-care professions such as nursing and medicine. However the visibility of the management profession within healthcare has been rising in recent years, due largely to the widespread problems developed countries are having in balancing cost, access, and quality in their hospitals and health systems.

== See also ==
- Health insurance
- Health Insurance Innovations
- Health Advocate
- Master of Health Administration
- Nosokinetics
