= Antiserum =

Blood serum containing antibodies; used to spread passive immunity

In immunology, antiserum is a blood serum containing antibodies (either monoclonal or polyclonal) that is used to spread passive immunity to many diseases via blood donation (plasmapheresis). For example, convalescent serum, or passive antibody transfusion from a previous human survivor, was the only known effective treatment for Ebola infection with a high success rate of 7 out of 8 patients surviving.

Antisera are widely used in diagnostic virology laboratories. The most common use of antiserum in humans is as antitoxin or antivenom to treat envenomation.

Serum therapy, also known as serotherapy, describes the treatment of infectious diseases using the serum of animals that have been immunized against the specific organism or components of that organism that is causing the infection.

== History ==
In 1890, Emil von Behring and Kitasato Shibasaburō published their first paper on serum therapy.

Behring pioneered the technique, using guinea pigs to produce serum. Based on his observation that people who survived infection with the diphtheria bacterium never became infected again, he discovered that the body continually produces an antitoxin, which prevents survivors of infections from being infected again with the same organism.

It was necessary for Behring to immunize larger animals in order to produce enough serum to protect humans, because the amount of antiserum produced by guinea pigs was too little to be practical. Horses proved to be the best serum producer, as the serum of other large animals was not concentrated enough, and it was believed that horses did not carry any diseases that could be transferred to humans.

Due to World War I, a large number of horses were needed for military purposes. It was difficult for Behring to find enough German horses for his serum facility. He chose to obtain horses from Eastern European countries, mostly Hungary and Poland. Because of Behring's limited financial resources, most of the horses he selected were intended for slaughter; however, the usefulness of the animal to others had no influence on the production of serum. Serum horses were calm, well-mannered, and in good health. Age, breed, height, and color were irrelevant.

Horses were transported from Poland or Hungary to the Behring facilities in Marburg, in the West-Central part of Germany. Most of the horses were transported by rail and treated like any other freight load. During the interminable border crossing, horses were left at the mercy of the weather. Once the horses arrived in Marburg, they had 3 to 4 weeks to recover in a quarantine facility, where their data was recorded. They had to be in perfect medical condition for the immunization, and the quarantine facility ensured that they were free of microbes which could infect the other horses. In the Behring facilities, the horses were viewed as life savers; therefore, they were well treated. A few of the individual horses used for serum production were named, and celebrated for their service to medicine, both human and non-human.

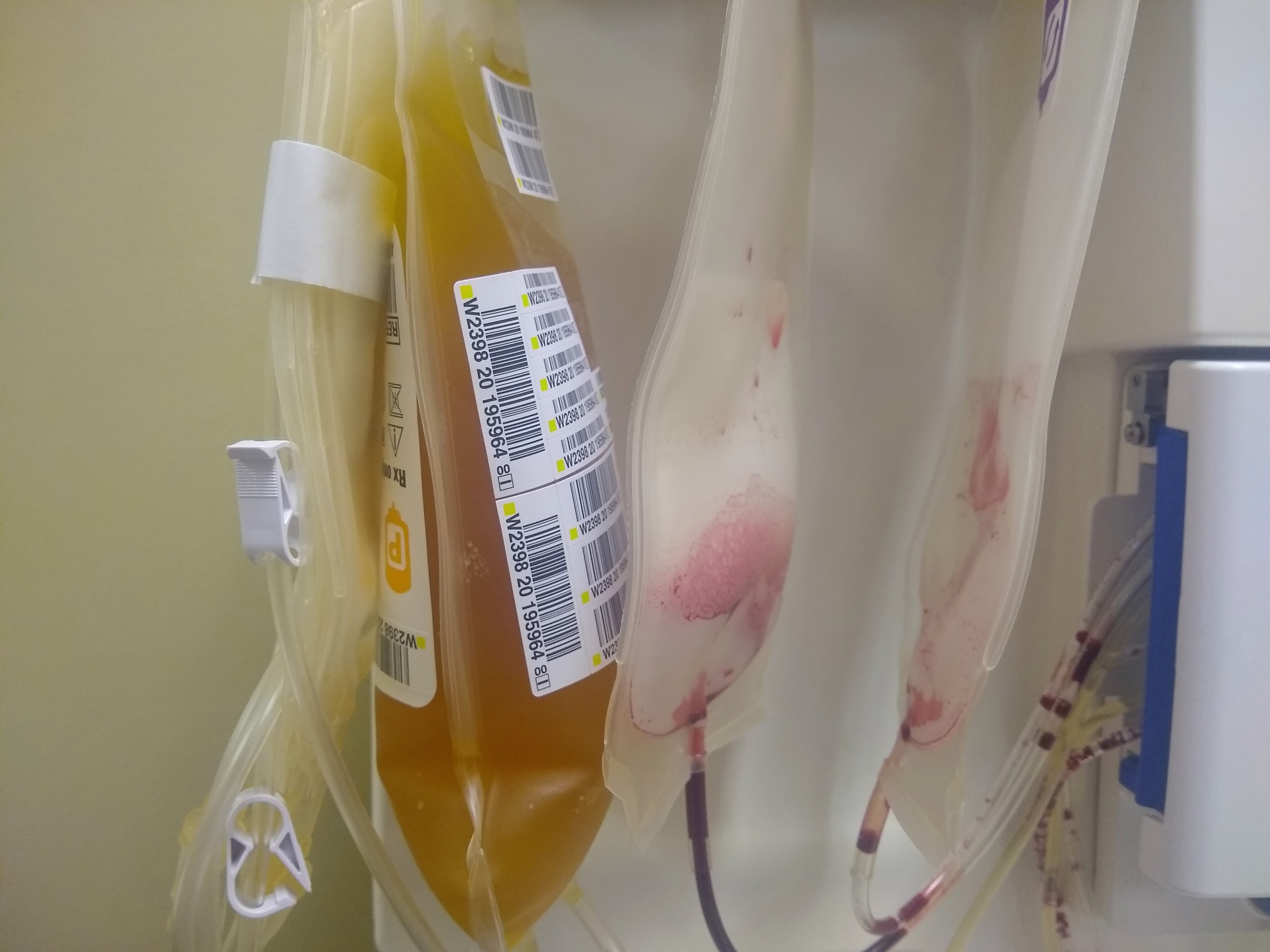
Convalescent plasma collected at a blood donor center during the COVID-19 pandemic.

At the end of the 19th century, every second child in Germany was infected with diphtheria, the most frequent cause of death in children up to 15 years of age. In 1891, Behring saved the life of a young girl with diphtheria by injecting antiserum for the first time in history. Serum horses proved to be saviors of diphtheria-infected people. Subsequently, proactive protective vaccination against diphtheria and other microbial diseases were developed, including treatments for tetanus, rabies, and snake venom.

In 1901, Behring won the first Nobel Prize in Medicine for his work in studying diphtheria.

Serum therapy became increasingly prevalent for infectious diseases, and was even used to treat patients during the influenza pandemic in 1918. The use of serum therapy was then quickly expanded to also treat diseases such as polio, measles, pneumococcus, Haemophilus influenza B, and meningococcus.

In the 1920s, Michael Heidelberger and Oswald Avery proved that antibodies were proteins that targeted the capsule of the virus or bacteria. The discovery of antibiotics in the 1940s diminished interest in treating bacterial infections with antiserum, but its use for viral infections continued with the development of ethanol fractionation of blood plasma (which allowed for purified antibodies), discovered by Edwin Cohn. Antisera were developed to prevent and/or treat diphtheria, tetanus, Hepatitis B, rabies, varicella zoster virus, cytomegalovirus, and botulinum. However, these treatments were not widely used.

In 1984, Milstein and Köhler won a Nobel Prize for their paper which described their method for making murine monoclonal antibodies by immortalizing B cells as hybridomas. Another breakthrough occurred in 2003. A new technology allowed for heavy and light chain immunoglobulin genes to be amplified from human B cells and cloned into expression vectors. In 2008, this method was refined with a greater ability to sort cells and clone, which led to the discovery of more human monoclonal antibodies.

In 1996, the United States Food and Drug Administration (FDA) approved the use of RSV-IGIV (Respigam), a polyclonal antibody drug to inhibit respiratory syncytial virus (RSV) for high-risk newborns. This was considered a breakthrough, as the clinical trial reduced infant hospitalizations by 41% and length of hospital stays by 53%. After 2 years, the product demand began to exceed the supply of plasma and Synagis, the first humanized monoclonal antibody, was approved in its place. Monoclonal antibodies became advantageous due to their decreased variability in quality, a decreased risk of bloodborne diseases, and increased potency. This enabled a large expansion of the uses of antiserum and opened the door for the treatment of autoimmune diseases.

The past 30 years have seen the transformation of how chronic and autoimmune diseases (e.g., cancer, ulcerative colitis) are treated, with 30 drugs of monoclonal antibodies, 28 for chronic conditions, being approved. Monoclonal antibodies are currently being researched to treat viral diseases without vaccines, such as HIV, SARS, and MERS.

== Modern use ==
Monoclonal antibodies are used to treat both acute and chronic conditions. Acute conditions may include, but are not limited to Ebola virus, envenomation (e.g., snake bites), and anthrax infection. Chronic conditions may include, but are not limited to rheumatoid arthritis, ulcerative colitis, and lupus.

There are four main types of monoclonal antibodies: murine, chimeric, humanized, and human.

Murine monoclonal antibodies are identified with the suffix "-omab". They originate from murine animals and can trigger allergic reactions in humans. An example is blinatumomab, which is used to treat acute lymphoblastic leukemia.

Chimeric monoclonal antibodies are identified with the suffix "-ximab". They originate partially from a murine animal and partially from a human. An example is infliximab, which is used to treat Crohn's disease.

Humanized monoclonal antibodies are identified with the suffix "-zumab". They mostly originate from a human but differ in the component that attaches to its target. An example is crizanlizumab, which treats sickle cell disease.

Human monoclonal antibodies are identified with the suffix "-umab". They originate from a human. An example is ustekinumab, which treats psoriasis.

During the early stages of the COVID-19 pandemic, reliable treatment options had not yet been found or approved. Consequently, convalescent blood plasma was considered as a possibility and is used as a treatment option at least for severe cases. In May 2021, India was one of the first major countries to remove plasma from its national COVID-19 guidelines. This was after public criticism of the plasma's lack of effectiveness, criticism of health systems, and opinions from leading Indian scientists including Shahid Jameel, Soumyadeep Bhaumik, Gagandeep Kang, Soumitra Pathare, and others. The World Health Organization (WHO) recommended against use of plasma in COVID-19 in December 2021.

Monoclonal antibodies (casirivimab/imdevimab) were developed for the treatment of COVID-19.

On June 7, 2021, the FDA approved aducanumab, the first anti-Alzheimer's drug to be introduced into markets almost 20 years after the approval of memantine in 2003.

== Mechanism of action ==
Antibodies in the antiserum bind to the infectious agent or specifically, the antigen. The immune system then recognizes infectious agents or pathogens bound to antibodies and triggers a more robust immune response. The use of antiserum is particularly effective against pathogens which are capable of evading the unstimulated immune system but are not robust enough to evade the stimulated immune system. The existence of antibodies to the pathogen depends on an initial survivor whose immune system, produced effective antibodies for the pathogen or a host species which carries the pathogen but does not experience its effects. Further stocks of antiserum can then be produced from the initial survivor or from a donor organism (human or animal) that is inoculated with the pathogen and cured by some stock of pre-existing antiserum. Diluted snake venom is often used as an antiserum to give passive immunity to the snake venom itself.

Horses that were infected by a pathogen were vaccinated thrice in increasing dosage amounts. The time between each vaccination varied from each horse and its health condition. Normally, the horses needed a few weeks to produce the serum in the blood after the last vaccination. Even though they tried to observe the immune system of the horses during this immunization with painstaking care, most of the horses experienced appetite loss, fever, and, in worse cases, shock and dyspnea.

The highest immunization risk for horses was the production of antiserum for snake venom. The horse was immunized with all types of snake venom at the same time because it was not always possible to know by which snake species a person had been bitten. Therefore, the antiserum had to immunize the horse against the venom of every snake species.

In order to find when most antitoxins are produced in the blood cells, frequent blood samples were taken from the horses. At the point when the highest amount of antibodies were produced, 5 liters of blood, a 10th of the blood volume of a horse, were taken through a cannula. The blood was collected in a glass cylinder and brought to the laboratory in the Behring facilities. Above the rouleaux formation which contained the red blood cells, the serum was visible. The color of the serum varied from milky to brown. Concentration and sterility of the serum were checked carefully, and the serum was filtered many times. Protein content was decreased in order to use the serum for humans.

After the blood sampling, the horses could rest for 3 to 4 weeks and received extra food to recover from the blood loss. During this period of time, the horses were especially weak and prone to disease and infection.

Within a few years, with experience and observation of the horses, a rouleaux formation of the blood sample was placed back into the animal's body. This procedure is called plasmapheresis.
