= Obesity in Thailand =

Share of adults that are obese, 1975 to 2016

Obesity in Thailand has been flagged as a major source of health concern, with 32% of the population identifying as overweight and 9% obese. With reference to 2016 data from the World Health Organization (WHO), Thailand has one of the highest incidence of overweight citizens in the South East Asian region, second to only Malaysia. The Thai National Health Examination Surveys (NHES) found that obesity in Thailand more than doubled during the period 1991-2014. This spike in obesity levels has been largely attributed to increased access to junk food, and unhealthy switches from active to sedentary lifestyles. These factors are closely linked to economic growth in the country.

== Classification of obesity ==
The internationally recognised method of measuring obesity is through the Body Mass Index (BMI). According to WHO, an overweight person has a BMI of ≥25. An obese person has a BMI of ≥30. However, while the WHO standard has been used internationally, studies have shown that it may not be accurate for the classification of obesity in the Asian context due to different body fat percentages and body compositions. Instead, an alternative standard should be used. As proposed by the International Association for the Study of Obesity and the International Obesity Task Force (IOTF) in 2000, the Regional Office for the Western Pacific (WPRO) standard is more appropriate for Asian populations. According to WPRO, an overweight person has a BMI of ≥ 23. An obese person has a BMI of ≥25.

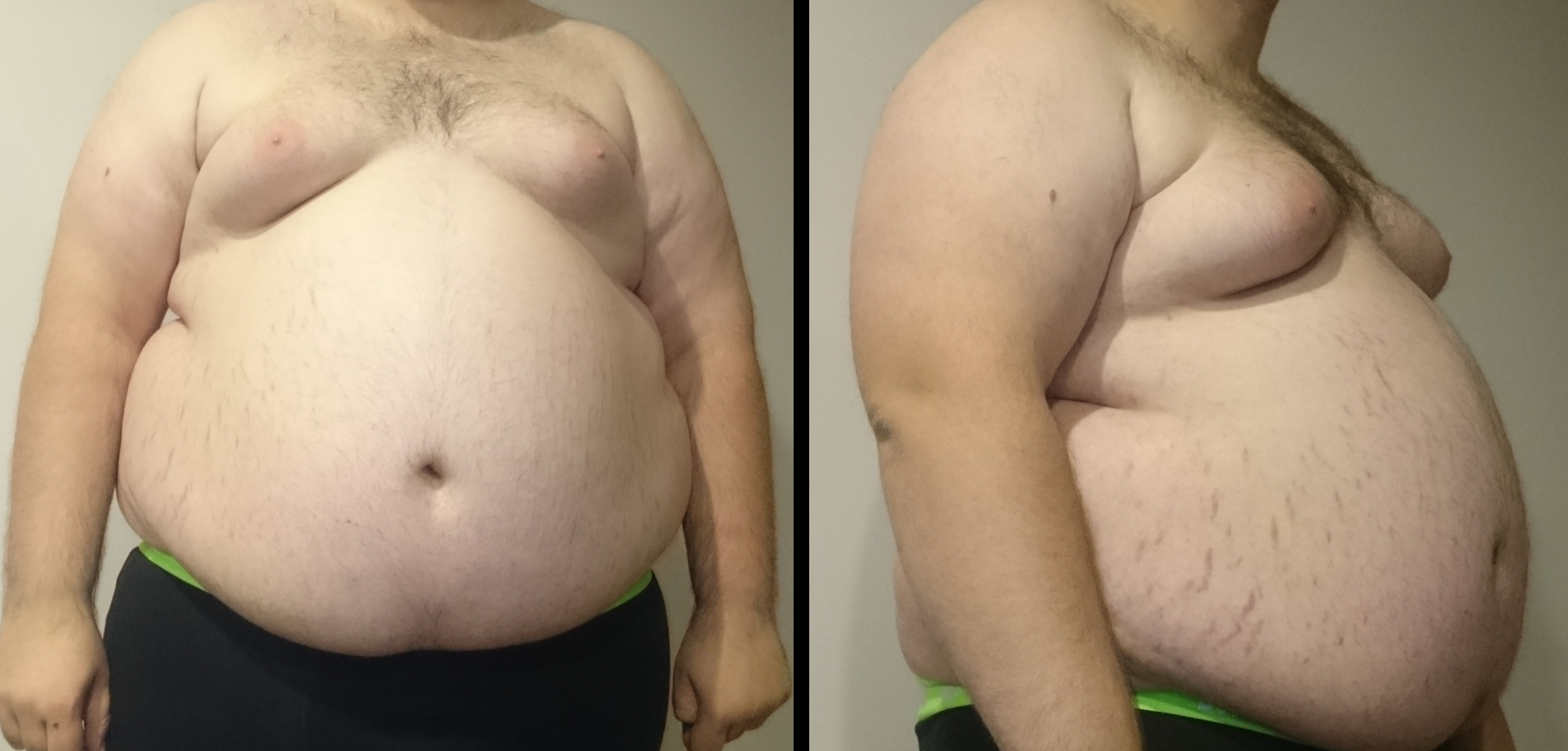
Obese male with a BMI of 52.8. Obesity levels have been on the rise in Thailand.

== Prevalence of obesity in the Thai population ==
According to WHO, overweight and obesity levels in Thailand have been steadily increasing over the years. The percentage of overweight or obese adults increased from 8.6% in 1975 to 32.6% in 2016.

=== Thai Adults ===
In 2004, a study involving 3,220 adults between the age 20 – 59 was carried out. The age-adjusted overweight and obesity levels were found to be 28.3% and 6.8%, respectively.

Using the WPRO standard, results from the Thai Food Consumption Survey (TFCS) in 2005 showed that the combined prevalence of overweight and obesity in Thai adults aged 19 years and over exceeded 40%. An estimated 17.1% of those surveyed fell under the classification of overweight (BMI 23.0 – 24.9), 19.0% categorised as class 1 obesity (BMI 25.0 – 29.9), and 4.8% as class 2 obesity (BMI ≥ 30.0). It was also found that obesity had a larger impact on women than men, with combined obesity and overweight rates at 46.1% and 35.5%, respectively. Obesity was more commonly found to occur in urban settings as compared to suburban areas.

NHES is a nationwide survey which measures the health status of Thai citizens. As to date, 5 reports have been released over a period of 23 years. Namely in 1991, 1996, 2004, 2009 and 2014. Results from the 2009 survey showed combined overweight and obesity levels to be at 41% for females and 28% for males. 5 years later, the 2014 survey showed the prevalence of overweight and obesity in females increased to 43% and rose to 33% in males.

In 2011, the WHO found that 32.6% of Thais were overweight, ranking the country second heaviest in South East Asia, with higher obesity levels than more affluent nations including the Republic of Korea, Japan and Singapore.

The Behavioural Risk Factor Surveillance System (BRFSS) was set up in 2005 to track the health status of Thais. It uses the WHO standard of BMI.

The prevalence of obesity in Thailand coincides with increased intake of sugary drinks. In 2010, it was reported that an average Thai consumed 93.9 litres of sweetened drinks on a yearly basis. This figure rose by 23.8% in 2015, to 115.6 litres.

=== Children and adolescents ===
In 1992, a 5 year follow-up study involving primary and secondary schools of Hat Yai municipality, south Thailand was conducted. This study, involving 2,252 school children, tracked overweight prevalence from childhood to adolescence. From the period 1992 to 1997, it was observed that 11.8% of children remained overweight. It was concluded that overweight children face a much higher probability of being overweight as adults, and are at a higher risk of developing overweight related health diseases.

Comparing results from NHES released in 1996 and a separate national survey conducted in 2001, obesity levels in children aged 2 to 12 years experienced a rise. Obesity prevalence in preschool children (ages 2 to 5) increased from 5.8% in 1996 to 7.9% in 2001. Children in the age group 6 to 12 years saw an increase in obesity rates from 5.8% to 6.7%. Data also showed that obesity was a more prevalent problem amongst children living in urban areas, as compared to rural areas.

In 2003, a nationwide survey was conducted by the National Health Foundation. It involved 47,389 grade 6 primary school children in urban settings. From this, it was found that 16.7% of the children surveyed were either obese or overweight.

In 2007, a school-based cross sectional study was conducted to determine the prevalence of obesity in Thai children in rural Ongkharak. This study tracked the height and weight of 1,140 children between the ages 6 to 15. The results were based on the International Obesity Task Force standard and revealed the prevalence of overweight and obesity levels to be 12.8% and 9.4% respectively.

In 2013, another study was conducted in Ongkharak, to establish the association of obesity with hypertension in school children. A total of 3,991 students with a mean age of 9.5 years were studied. This study revealed that signs of hypertension were higher in obese and overweight children, as compared to children within the healthy weight range, at 49.5% and 26.5% versus 16.2% respectively. Furthermore, it was found that prevalence of overweight and obesity levels were 13.8% and 15.5% respectively. This is an increase from the previous study conducted in 2007.

The Global Burden of Disease Study over the time period 1980 – 2013 showed that childhood obesity in developing countries increased from 8.1% to 12.9% for boys and from 8.4% to 13.4% in girls.

=== Buddhist Monks ===
In 2006, a survey involving Buddhist monks and novices in Central Bangkok was carried out. The results showed that 35% of participants were at risk of developing obesity related health issues.

In the following year, Priest Hospital released a report documenting the prevalence of obesity related health issues amongst monks. The study which consisted of 17,381 monks showed that 17.8% were diabetic, 17.1% had hypertension and 13.5% were found to have hyperlipidaemia.

A study carried out by Chulalongkorn University in 2016 revealed obesity rates amongst monks to be at 48%. Approximately 42% of those surveyed displayed high cholesterol levels, 23% had high blood pressure and 10.4% were diabetic. In 2012 alone, healthcare costs borne by the Thai government amounted to $8.5 million (or 300 million baht).

Most recently in 2017, the Ministry of Public Health (Thailand) surveyed monks from 200 temples, across 50 Bangkok districts. The study revealed high blood cholesterol and high blood sugar plaguing 60% and 50% of those surveyed, respectively.

Obesity amongst monks has been attributed to lack of exercise and overnutrition from unhealthy food offered by devotees. Following the Buddhist discipline, monks cannot reject alms given to them, which usually consists of food that are high in fat and sugar. Furthermore, exercise is usually shunned by monks as it is seen as a form of egotism.

== Diabetes and cost of obesity ==
In a statement released by the Thai Ministry of Public Health, Non-communicable diseases (NCDs) were listed as the 'No. 1 health issue' in the country, 'both in terms of number (of) casualties and burden of disease'. Diabetes was also flagged as one of the major components of NCDs plaguing the Thai population. Comparing data from NHES conducted in 2009 and 2014, the prevalence of diabetes increased from 6.9% to 8.9% (or an increase of about 300,000 citizens annually). As of 2017, 8.3% of Thai adults were diabetic.

Referencing the death register of the Bureau of Registration Administration, Ministry of Interior, it was found that between 2012-2015, the number of premature deaths caused by NCDs increased. In particular, it was found that deaths by diabetes increased from 13.2 to 17.8 per 100,000 people.

A 2009 joint study between the Health Intervention and Technology Assessment Program (HITAP) of the Ministry of Public Health and Mahidol University showed that the cost of obesity on the Thai health system amounted to $404 million or 12 billion baht annually. The research further revealed that direct health care cost for patients accounted for 46% (or $186 million) of total obesity costs. Indirect health care costs made up the remaining 54% (or $218 million), with opportunity costs related to premature deaths totalling $195 million and hospital related absenteeism totalling $23 million.

== Government responses ==
Over the years, the Thai government has launched a series of health campaigns in an attempt to reverse this increasing obesity trend in the country. From 2002 to 2017, campaigns aimed at encouraging healthy habits among Thais took up 92% of the yearly ThaiHealth expenditure.

Studies have shown that childhood obesity tends to lead to adult obesity. As a result, it has been suggested by academics that efforts to curb and prevent overweight and obesity should start in childhood.

=== 'Foods for Children' ===
The strong presence of fast food advertising on Thai television has been identified as a major culprit in the development of unhealthy eating habits. In 2007, in an attempt to reverse this, the Thai Food and Drug Administration (FDA) and Public Relations Department placed restrictions on food advertisements targeting children on prime-time television. 'Foods for Children' related advertisements were only allowed screen time of 12 mins per hour. In addition, fast food toys were banned and all unhealthy products had to be labelled with 'Eat Less, Exercise More".

=== Promoting regular exercise and physical activity ===
Efforts to encourage regular exercise and physical activity have been seen on the part of the Ministry of Public Health since 2009. Such initiatives include setting up exercise corners in public areas within society. To further promote physical activity, bike lanes have been set up across the country. This has positively impacted physical activity levels among Thai adults, which increased from 66.3% to 72.9% between 2012 and 2017.

=== 'Thai People Have Flat Belly' ===
Launched in 2010, this campaigned for healthy food consumption and higher levels of exercise to reduce non-communicable diseases. A similar approach was taken by the Royal College of Physicians of Thailand to launch 'Network of Flatless Belly Thais' to reduce intra-abdominal adiposity and metabolic syndrome for Thai citizens.

=== 'Sweet Enough Network' ===
In 2010, 'Sweet Enough Network' was set up by the Ministry of Public Health's Dental Health Division, to push for tighter regulations regarding sugary drinks in Thailand. This campaign advocated the banning of sugary drinks sold in educational institutions as well as added sugar found in follow-up milk powder for babies. The Thai government responded by implementing a nationwide ban of added sugar in follow-up milk powder for babies.

=== Sugar tax on sweetened drinks ===
In 2017, a sugar tax on sweetened beverages was implemented by the Thai National Legislative Council. This was seen as an attempt to curb heightened levels of overweight and obesity in the country. Sweetened drinks are subjected to a 14% excise tax on the suggested selling price, along with an additional tax on its sugar content. This sugar tax is projected to rise every 2 years, over a period of 6 years. As a result of this, sugar consumption within the country decreased by 3% between the time period 2017 and 2018.

=== Health Charter for Buddhist Monks ===
In 2017, the Health Charter for Buddhist was launched, in an attempt to promote healthy living and curb obesity levels amongst Thai monks. This was implemented with the aim of creating self-awareness on health issues that are in line with Buddhist values as well as educating the public about importance of healthy eating.

== See also ==
- Health in Thailand
- Epidemiology of obesity
