= Göran Tomson =

Swedish physician and academic

- Born: 12 December 1947
- Citizenship: Swedish
- Education: Karolinska Institutet
- Known for: Co-founder of the Swedish Institute for Global Health Transformation (SIGHT) at the Royal Swedish Academy of Sciences, and foundational work leading to the establishment of the Alliance for Health Policy and Systems Research, now hosted at the WHO
- Awards: Distinguished Fellow at the George Institute for Global Health
- Scientific career
- Fields: Global Health, Health Systems Research
- Workplaces: Karolinska Institutet
- Thesis: (1990)

Göran Tomson (born 12 December 1947) is a Swedish physician, academic and health policy and systems researcher. He is known for his contributions to field-building of health policy systems research through initial consultations and advocacy at the Lejondal Meeting in Stockholm and accompanying reports and proposals that led to the establishment of the Alliance for Health Policy & Systems Research at the WHO. He is also a professor at the Karolinska Institutet and holds the position of Counselor for the UN Agenda 2030 at the president’s office at Karolinska Institutet. In 2022, he was recognised as a distinguished fellow at the George Institute for Global Health.

His research on universal health coverage and other health systems issues has focused on many countries, including China, Kenya, Lao PDR, Sweden, Tanzania, Uganda, Vietnam, and Zambia. He has been involved in setting up impactful consortia and global health research networks that have made contributions to health policy and systems research, access to medicines and antimicrobial resistance. He also teaches health policy and systems research at Karolinska Institutet.
