= Institute for Health Metrics and Evaluation =

Public health research institute in Seattle, Washington

Coordinates: 47.6163°N 122.3438°W

- Abbreviation: IHME
- Formation: 2007; 19 years ago
- Type: Research institute
- Purpose: Accelerating global health progress through sound measurement and accountable science
- Location: 3980 15th Ave NE, Seattle, Washington, USA
- Parent organization: University of Washington
- Website: healthdata.org

The Institute for Health Metrics and Evaluation (IHME) is a public health research institute of the University of Washington in Seattle. Its research fields are global health statistics and impact evaluation.

IHME is headed by Christopher J.L. Murray, a physician, health economist, and global health researcher, and professor at the University of Washington Department of Global Health, which is part of the School of Medicine. IHME conducts research and trains scientists, policymakers, and the public in health metrics concepts, methods, and tools. Its mission includes judging the effectiveness and efficacy of health initiatives and national health systems. IHME also trains students at the post-baccalaureate and post-graduate levels.

== History ==
IHME was launched in June 2007 on a core grant of $105 million primarily funded by the Bill & Melinda Gates Foundation. Among its earliest projects was to produce new estimates of mortality rates, which were published in The Lancet in September 2007. The Institute updated these in 2010 and again in 2014. It has published maternal, child, and adult mortality estimates as well. Founding board members included Chair Julio Frenk, Dean of the Harvard School of Public Health; Harvey Fineberg, President of the Institute of Medicine; Gro Harlem Brundtland, former Prime Minister of Norway; Tedros Adhanom Ghebreyesus, the Minister of Health for Ethiopia; K. Srinath Reddy, President of the Public Health Foundation of India; Tomris Turmen, President of the International Children's Center and Head of the Department of Pediatrics/Newborn Medicine at the University of Ankara Medical School in Ankara, Turkey; Lincoln Chen, President of the China Medical Board; Jane Halton, who has served as Secretary of the Department of Health and Ageing in Australia, as well as the Department of Finance; and David Roux, Co-Chief Executive of Silver Lake Partners.

IHME's current board members are Frenk; Fineberg; Chen; Halton; and Roux, in addition to Stephen J. Cucchiaro, Chief Investment Officer of Windhaven Investment Management; Sally Davies, Chief Medical Officer (CMO) for England; and John W. Stanton, managing director of Trilogy Partnership.

In 2011, IHME co-sponsored the first Global Health Metrics & Evaluation conference in Seattle with The Lancet, London School of Hygiene & Tropical Medicine, Harvard School of Public Health, and University of Queensland School of Population Health.

In 2017, the Gates Foundation provided IHME with another $279 million grant.

In 2020, IHME published its model projecting deaths from COVID-19 pandemic in America, and informed guidelines developed by then-President Trump's administration. However, on March 26, 2020, IHME published a study, which concluded that roughly 81,000 Americans could die from COVID-19 pandemic across the nationwide in four months' time.

=== COVID-19 excess deaths (2020–21) ===
The officially reported deaths from COVID-19 pandemic in the worldwide has almost reached 6 million people. But according to the IHME, this analysis that the institute find the estimated number of excess deaths due to COVID-19 pandemic, started from Wednesday, January 1, 2020 to Friday, December 31, 2021, has reaching 18.3 million people with nearly three times higher over that period. Although the global all-age rate of excess mortality due to the pandemic was 120.3 deaths (113.1–129.3 deaths) per 100,000 of the population.

This estimated report of 18.3 million COVID-19 excess deaths globally is a combination of direct measurement, as well as statistical model prediction in places with less than ideal data systems. IHME see a pattern where the top 5 countries with a highest number of COVID-19 excess deaths, such as India (4 million people), China (1.8 million people), United States (1.1 million people), Russia (1 million people), and Mexico (800,000 people), while the top 5 countries with a lowest number of COVID-19 excess deaths, such as Australia, Singapore, New Zealand, Iceland, and Brunei. So that is a combination of large population size, but also the global nature of COVID-19 excess deaths that we have seen during the first two years of the pandemic.

The full impact of COVID-19 pandemic has been much greater than what is indicated by reported deaths due to COVID-19 alone. Strengthening death registration systems around the world, long understood to be crucial to global public health strategy, is necessary for improved monitoring of this pandemic and future pandemics. In addition, further research is warranted to help distinguish the proportion of excess mortality that was directly caused by SARS-CoV-2 infection and the changes in causes of death as an indirect consequence of the outbreak.

== Research ==
IHME gathers health-related data and develops analytical tools to track trends in mortality, diseases, and risk factors, and capsulizes many of its research findings in data visualizations. It evaluates interventions such as vaccines, malaria control policies, cancer screenings, and birth care. To enable researchers to replicate IHME's work and to foster new research, IHME created the Global Health Data Exchange (GHDx) where methods and results are cataloged and freely accessible.

IHME also has launched policy reports on a wide range of topics, including a June 2010 report on child and maternal mortality. The findings were updated in 2014. In 2009, IHME launched its series of Financing Global Health policy reports. Annual updates have been published since then.

Recent publications have included estimations of causes of death worldwide, the incidence of HIV, TB, and malaria, as well as obesity, cigarette smoking, heart disease, and small area estimation of diabetes rates in the United States. IHME has also worked with other organizations on projects. For example, IHME researchers helped create the 2010 WHO World Malaria Report, generating all the estimates for insecticide-treated nets. IHME has also collaborated on country-level research projects, including a partnership with the Kingdom of Saudi Arabia to help create a health surveillance system to track disease trends and inform policy.

=== Global Burden of Disease ===
In the Global Burden of Diseases, Injuries, and Risk Factors (GBD) Study 2010, a worldwide consortium of 500 researchers, coordinated by IHME measured the impact of more than 290 health conditions and 67 health risk factors worldwide. The GBD enterprise produced estimates in 21 regions around the world for disability-adjusted life years by age and sex for the past two decades. Part of this research has involved conducting in-person surveys in several countries and gathering health information through a website survey. The team created a cause of death database that includes 60 years of data, or almost 800 million deaths. To illustrate the findings, IHME released a suite of interactive data visualizations, which are available to the public.The aim is to allow policymakers and other decision-makers to "compare the effects of different diseases – such as cancer versus depression – that kill people prematurely and cause ill health," to show disease trends over time, and to inform policy, IHME states on its website.

The Seattle Times labeled it "the most comprehensive review of the state of humanity's health ever undertaken."

The UK and China are among the countries working with IHME to generate subnational burden of disease estimates at the county and province levels.

In January 2014, IHME began releasing updates to the work, called the Global Burden of Diseases, Injuries, and Risk Factors (GBD) Study 2013. The work generated over 1 billion estimates of health outcomes. GBD estimates are now being updated annually.

Some of the findings have been controversial. In 2012, IHME researchers estimated 1.2 million people died from malaria in 2010, double the WHO's estimate.

==== Response to GBD ====
The 2010 Global Burden of Disease report was criticized for its lack of transparency of methods and data as well as its use of complex statistical methods to fill in data gaps when reliable statistics were unavailable. Thomas Bollyky, a senior fellow at the Council on Foreign Relations, called for more transparency. The report was also criticized for its use of verbal autopsies because many diseases have similar symptoms, leading to potential mistakes.

Igor Rudan and Kit Yee Chan note that IHME "struggled to generate support, legitimacy, and acceptance for their findings" after publishing the 2010 Global Burden of Disease Study, due to concerns of lack of transparency, as well as the existence of parallel estimates of disease burden from WHO; but argue that the emergence of IHME introduced competition to the field of global health metrics, which was previously a field where WHO maintained a monopoly: "The GBD initiative has emerged as a well-organised and rapidly growing collaboration that is now seriously challenging WHO's role in generating global health estimates".

The World Health Organization did not acknowledge the GBD 2010 estimates.

The Global Burden of Disease Study 2013 expanded collaboration and increased transparency but "[fell] short of allowing full independent replication of all results".

In May 2018, WHO and IHME signed a memorandum of understanding, agreeing to strengthen collaboration on the GBD and enhance policy use of GBD findings.

=== Disease Control Priorities Network ===
The Disease Control Priorities Network project generates cost-effectiveness estimates for a range of health interventions. A team of demographers, statisticians, economists, and other experts are studying how to improve the allocation of resources among interventions, technologies, hospitals, and other service delivery platforms. They are working in multiple countries, including the US, India, and South Africa. Their cost-effectiveness work has revealed some hidden connections. For example, a 2010 report showed improving girls' education in poor countries is the most effective way to reduce child mortality, which was a surprise for some people.

An effort launched in 2011 called Access, Bottlenecks, Costs, and Equity (ABCE) involves collecting evidence and analyzing data to improve the cost-effectiveness and equity of health systems in Colombia, Ghana, India, Kenya, Lebanon, Uganda, and Zambia. The project examines four components that affect health care delivery: access (to health facilities), bottlenecks (limitations on the supply side), costs, and equity (across populations). The work includes in-depth facility surveys and inventories across a range of service delivery platforms; additional data is collected in countries with high HIV/AIDS burdens through exit interviews and chart extraction.

A 2013 report concluded that neonatal and maternal mortality in Ghana could be best improved not with sophisticated maternity care but with better transportation infrastructure.

=== Population Health Metrics Research Consortium project ===
The Population Health Metrics Research Consortium created new methods for tracking health intervention coverage in low-resource settings. The methods have been used to measure mortality, causes of death, and incidence of major illnesses where data are incomplete. Researchers collected data in India, Mexico, the Philippines, and Tanzania.

IHME's work on estimating mortality has been at times controversial. In 2009, IHME published a study on maternal mortality which some advocacy groups tried to suppress – worried that results showing a decline in mortality would make it harder to fund-raise. The WHO also initially disagreed with the new results, but later revised their estimates in agreement with those of IHME.

=== Malaria Control Policy Assessment Project ===
The Malaria Control Policy Assessment project evaluates the effectiveness of malaria-control interventions in Uganda and Zambia by analyzing their effect on child mortality and producing estimates at the national and local levels.

=== United States Public Health Research ===
IHME conducts American research, including estimates of mortality, life expectancy, risk factors, health disparities, and disease prevalence. IHME has compiled national and local health trends and integrated multiple data sources to monitor disparities in chronic diseases.

A 2013 report, the State of US Health, looked at trends in premature deaths due to injury or disease, and demonstrated the major health threat stemming from behavioral risk factors such as poor diet and sedentary lifestyles. It concluded that dietary factors cause more deaths each year than cancer or smoking. The results included life expectancy trends broken down by state and county.

First Lady Michelle Obama cited the research in her campaign to improve Americans' diets and increase their level of physical activity.

A paper published in the journal Population Health Metrics in June 2011 showed that life expectancy was rising in some poorer US counties – especially in the South – a surprising result which was widely discussed.

Other research projects include the Salud Mesoamérica 2015 Initiative, which focuses on inequalities in health outcomes and access in southern Mexico and Central America; Gavi Full Country Evaluations, which evaluates immunization programs in Bangladesh, India, Mozambique, Uganda and Zambia; and HealthRise, a partnership with Medtronic Philanthropy to evaluate programs targeting diabetes and heart disease, and sponsor small grants to make improvements.

In 2014, IHME announced the establishment of the University of Washington Center for Demography and Economics of Aging, funded by the National Institute on Aging (NIA). It is one of 14 NIA Demography Centers at leading universities and policy organizations around the United States.

=== Global Health Data Exchange (GHDx) ===
In March 2011, IHME launched the Global Health Data Exchange (or GHDx), which indexes and hosts information about microdata, aggregated data, and research results with a focus on health-related and demographic datasets. At launch, the site listed about 1,000 datasets; as of 2015, there are more than 30,000. As part of a partnership with the Centers for Disease Control and Prevention (CDC), GHDx includes 35 years of CDC data on child and maternal health. GHDx uses the Drupal 7 open source content management system and Apache SOLR for search. The site includes visualization and GIS tools, and has been noted by the health and global health communities.

=== COVID-19 Model Projection ===
In 2020, IHME published its model projecting deaths from COVID-19 pandemic in America, which was described as widely influential, and informed guidelines developed by then-President Trump's administration. The model predicted results significantly different from other models, and some epidemiologists urged caution in interpreting their model, which is described by some as "optimistic". The model received heavy criticism from some members of the epidemiological community for being flawed and misleading.

IHME released two major updates to its model in April and June 2020 to improve its accuracy and reflect different scenarios of social distancing and mask usage. IHME described its updated model as a "hybrid" of the statistical (curve fit) model the institute initially released and a mechanistic model grounded in epidemiological understanding of the virus. The hybrid model predicted dramatically more deaths than the curve-fit model and had much better out-of-sample prediction. On June 7, 2020, IHME published its first projections of COVID-19 deaths out to November 1 and forecasted 208,255 deaths (with a range of 186,087 to 244,541) due to the COVID-19 pandemic. Those numbers drop to 162,808 (157,217 to 171,193), if at least 95% of people wear face masks in public.

== Degree Programs ==
IHME offers two types of global health fellowships, plus master's degrees and PhD programs.

== Funders ==
IHME receives core grant funding from the Bill & Melinda Gates Foundation and the state of Washington. The US Centers for Disease Control and Prevention (CDC); Inter-American Development Bank; Gavi, the Vaccine Alliance; the National Heart, Lung and Blood Institute; Kingdom of Saudi Arabia Ministry of Health; Medtronic Philanthropy; and the National Institute on Aging have also contributed funding through project grants and contracts.

== Reception ==
Initially, some within the World Health Organization had criticized IHME for trying to do the work that WHO already does. There had also been tension between UNICEF and IHME because a report from the latter showed "lackluster progress" on child death rates.

In May 2018, WHO and IHME signed a memorandum of understanding, agreeing to strengthen collaboration on the GBD and enhance policy use of GBD findings.

== See also ==
- Timeline of global health
- Priority-setting in global health
- Medical dictionary
- Glossary of medicine
- Dean Jamison
