= Alexandra Martiniuk =

Canadian epidemiologist and acadermic

Alexandra Martiniuk is a Canadian epidemiologist and professor of epidemiology at the University of Sydney and professor of hospital transformation and future health systems at the University of New South Wales as well as also being an adjunct professor at the University of Toronto. She has a focus on Indigenous and global child and maternal health and is committed to using mixed method research to increase equitable access to quality health care.

Martiniuk is an honorary senior research fellow at the George Institute for Global Health and in 2020 she was awarded the Gustav Nossal Medal for global health and has received many other prestigious awards in her career.
