= Igor Rudan =

Croatian-British scientist (born 1971)

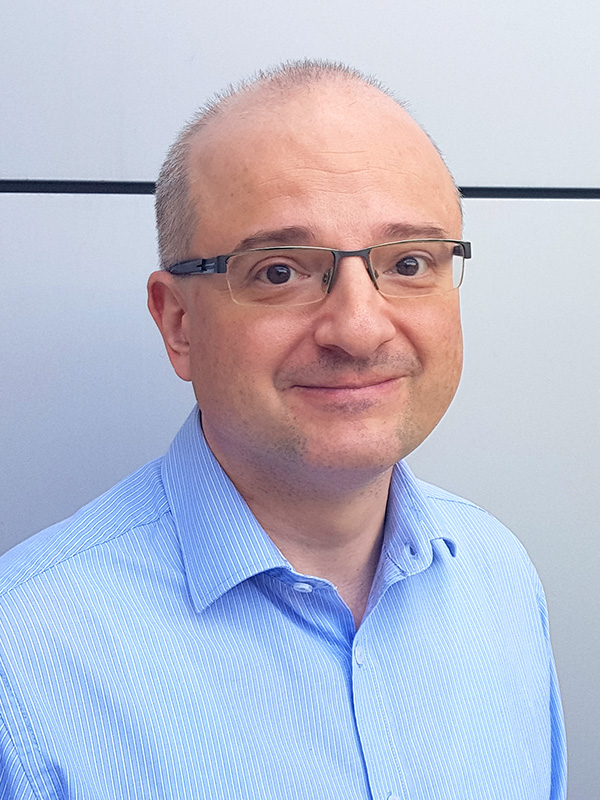
- Born: 7 March 1971 (age 55); Zagreb, Croatia
- Education: School of Mathematics and Computer Science, Zagreb, Croatia West Charlotte High School, Charlotte, NC, USA Postgraduate: University of Zagreb (M.Sc., D.Sc.) University of Pavia, Italy (M.P.H.) University of Edinburgh, UK (Ph.D.)
- Alma mater: Faculty of Medicine, University of Zagreb, Croatia
- Occupations: Scientist, Writer, and Science Communicator
- Children: 2
- Parents: Nikola Rudan (father); Tatjana Valić (mother)
- Website: igorrudan.com

Igor Rudan (born 7 March 1971) is a Croatian-British scientist and writer. He has conducted research in global health and genetics, wrote popular science books translated in several languages, and developed a documentary series on global health. He is a medical doctor with master's degrees in Anthropology and Epidemiology, as well as PhD degrees in Public Health and Genetic Epidemiology.

== Early life and education ==
=== Family ===
Igor Rudan was born in 1971 in Zagreb, Croatia, then a city of Yugoslavia. His father, Nikola Rudan, was a surgeon at the Institute for Tumors and Allied Diseases in Zagreb. Rudan's mother, Tatjana (née Valić), was a concert pianist.

=== Education ===
==== Primary School ====
From 1977 to 1985, Igor Rudan attended Veljko Vlahović Primary School on Krajiška Street in Zagreb.

==== Secondary School ====
In 1985, he enrolled at the High School for Mathematics and Computer Science (MIOC) in Zagreb, now the "XV gymnasium". Through the 'Open Door' exchange program, Igor Rudan completed his senior year of high school in the United States. From 1988 to 1989, he attended West Charlotte High School, in Charlotte, North Carolina.

== University education ==
=== Undergraduate ===
In 1989, Rudan returned to Zagreb to study medicine at the University of Zagreb Medical School. He studied during the period of the Homeland War in Croatia (1991-1995) and obtained a degree of Medical Doctor (M.D.) in 1995. He also engaged in cancer research with his father, Nikola Rudan, and with Professor Marija Strnad, the head of the Cancer Registry of Croatia. This collaboration resulted in more than 20 research papers, case reports, and case series published by them between 1992 and 1995.

=== Postgraduate ===
He continued his postgraduate education at the University of Zagreb. Mentored by Dr Branka Janicijevic from the Institute for Anthropological Research in Zagreb, he obtained a Master of Science (M.Sc.) degree from the University of Zagreb in 1997. This was for the study of the effects of consanguinity and inbreeding on cancer incidence in Croatian island isolate populations. A year later, in 1998, he obtained the Doctor of Science (D.Sc.) degree from the University of Zagreb Medical School. Mentored by Professor Silvije Vuletić from the Andrija Štampar School of Public Health, he studied the effects of isonomy and ancestral kinship on cancer in a remote island of Lastovo, Croatia, based on the reconstruction of genealogies for six generations of the local population.

In 1999, he joined the European School for Advanced Studies at the University of Pavia, Italy. Mentored by Professor Nadia Ranzani, he obtained a Master's degree in Public Health (M.P.H.) for a genetic epidemiological analysis of familial clusters of cancer on the island of Lastovo, Croatia. In 2000 and 2001, he received the British Scholarship Trust (BST) Fellowship, Overseas Research Scheme (ORS) Fellowship, and the Ph.D. fellowship from the University of Edinburgh. This allowed him to move to the United Kingdom and complete his Ph.D. in genetic epidemiology in 2005. Mentored by Professor Harry Campbell, he studied the effects of inbreeding and consanguinity on human quantitative traits and complex common diseases of late-onset.

== Career ==
In his early career, Rudan developed a biobank in the isolated island populations of Croatia ("10,001 Dalmatians"). He co-led the study that first identified associations between SLC2A9 genetic variants, uric acid levels, and gout. He identified variants that regulate human protein N-glycosylation and predispose a person to autoimmune diseases and cancers.

In his later career, he focused on international health efforts to reduce global child mortality as a member of the Child Health Epidemiology Reference Group (CHERG). He served as a consultant of the World Health Organization, UNICEF, the Bill & Melinda Gates Foundation, the World Bank, Save the Children, and other organizations. He co-developed the "CHNRI" methodology (in 2006) and EQUIST tool (in 2012). Both have been used by international agencies to prioritize investments in global health research and interventions, respectively.

He presently works as a professor of international health and molecular medicine and joint director of the Centre for Global Health and World Health Organization's Collaborating Centre for Population Health Research and Training at the University of Edinburgh. He is also the President of the International Society of Global Health, co-Editor-in-Chief of the Journal of Global Health, and visiting professor at the Nuffield Department of Primary Care Health Sciences and Green Templeton College at the University of Oxford, United Kingdom. He also completed a Global Public Health Leadership Program at Harvard University, USA, in 2025.

== Career in genetic research ==
After obtaining his first doctorate in 1999, Igor Rudan started to develop the biobank called "10,001 Dalmatians". At the time, this was a very rare DNA-based human biobank in a middle-income country. This resource for genetic epidemiological studies was established in a series of genetic isolate islands off the coast of Dalmatia region in Croatia. In 2001 he received the International Research Development Award from the Wellcome Trust for his research. Further development of this biobank was achieved through collaboration with Professors Harry Campbell from the University of Edinburgh and Alan F. Wright from the Human Genetics Unit of the Medical Research Council (MRC) in Edinburgh.

=== The outbreeding theory: Studying the effects of human inbreeding and admixture ===
Rudan's early work focused on studying the effects of inbreeding and admixture on human health and disease. At the time, in the early 2000s, one of the central questions relevant to gene mapping was to predict the genetic architecture of complex quantitative biological traits that underlie common late-onset diseases. Most research of that period assumed that it was "oligogenic", i.e., that only a handful of genes would confer the majority of genetic risk for complex quantitative traits and diseases. Using inbreeding studies within his PhD research, Rudan and his colleagues showed that the genetic architecture of those traits must be highly polygenic, with at least several hundred loci contributing to the genetic risk of human hypertension and late-onset diseases.

These studies, published in 2003, were regarded as controversial at the time, which made them difficult to publish. Their implications were summarized in a review published by the influential scientific journal Trends in Genetics in 2003. A decade later, hundreds of genome-wide association studies have shown that the genetic architecture of human quantitative traits and common complex disease of late-onset is highly polygenic. Rudan's work on studying the effects of inbreeding and admixture on human disease was continued at the University of Edinburgh through the PhD theses by Ozren Polasek, Ruth McQuillan, and Peter Joshi. After 16 years of continuous research, it resulted in a paper in Nature, demonstrating effects on stature and cognition in diverse human populations. Based on these results, Rudan proposed "the outbreeding theory", i.e., that large human movements, migrations and urbanization may be partly driving, through so-called "hybrid vigor", the observed secular trends, improvements in public health indicators and human lifespan.

=== 10001 Dalmatians: Genome-wide association studies of quantitative traits ===
Rudan developed the resource "10001 Dalmatians" with the help of his close collaborators Harry Campbell and Ozren Polašek. The biobank mainly comprised the examinees from the islands of Vis and Korčula in Dalmatia, Croatia. With the advent of "chips" for genome-wide scans developed by the company Illumina, genome-wide association studies became possible and the Croatian resource was among the first to carry them out. However, due to the highly polygenic nature of the studied traits, gene discovery required very large sample sizes. This led to many European and global biobanks joining together to form large collaborative consortia.

In collaboration with other international biobanks, the "10001 Dalmatians" resource contributed to the discovery of several thousands of human genetic variants that were associated with quantitative biological traits and complex diseases. Igor Rudan co-led the discovery of the SLC2A9 gene variants that were associated with uric acid levels and gout disease. In collaboration with Professor Gordan Lauc from the University of Zagreb, he also co-led the first two studies that identified genetic variants associated with human N-glycans levels.

== Career in global health ==
Since March 2001, Rudan has been working as a Technical Expert within the Child Health Epidemiology Reference Group (CHERG) of the World Health Organization and UNICEF. This influential group of researchers led the "child survival revolution" in the 21st century and made contributions that reduced global child mortality.

=== Child survival — United Nations's Millennium Development Goal 4 ===
Igor Rudan's contributions to the CHERG work included leading a systematic assessment to identify gaps in child health information globally and producing several reports on the global burden of pediatric infectious diseases, such as clinical pneumonia and diarrhea and meningitis. He also contributed to numerous influential estimates of the causes of global child mortality. Working with Professor Harry Campbell, he developed guidelines for performing community-based studies of childhood infections and evaluated existing and emerging interventions.

=== CHNRI method — setting global research priorities ===
Working as a consultant for Child Health and Nutrition Research Initiative (CHNRI) of the Global Forum for Health Research and funded mainly by the World Bank, Rudan coordinated an international expert panel to design and establish a systematic methodology for setting priorities in global health research investments, the CHNRI method. The CHNRI methodology has been implemented by many international organizations and in dozens of countries to identify research priorities, resulting in more than 200 reports in leading journals to date. It became the most widely used method to set health research priorities in the 21st century. Its wide implementation, the advancement of underlying methods and the introduction of artificial intelligence led Rudan to propose, together with Sir Aziz Sheikh, a new field of science called ideometrics - the science of generating, measuring and prioritising ideas.

=== EQUIST tool — prioritising investments in global health ===
Working as a consultant for UNICEF, Igor Rudan co-developed a method to address investment prioritization in health care and health interventions - Equitable Impact Sensitive Tool (EQUIST). The EQUIST tool was used by international organisations and national governments to conduct scenario analyses and identify priority populations, bottlenecks and operational strategies to reduce maternal and child mortality. EQUIST assists stakeholders to develop national health strategies that are evidence-based, equitable, and cost-effective in nature. In 2012-2013, the EQUIST model was expanded by UNICEF into a more user-friendly global data science platform. EQUIST has been used as a basis for Investment Case Studies required by a new global financial initiative called Global Financing Facility (GFF) launched in 2015 to finance the Sustainable Development Goals.

=== Journal of Global Health ===
In 2011, Igor Rudan founded a scientific journal — The Journal of Global Health — with two co-editors-in-chief. It was launched on the occasion of the 19th World Congress of Epidemiology. In 2017, he also founded Journal of Global Health Reports. Since 2019, both journals are officially published by the International Society of Global Health.

=== Global Health Epidemiology Research Group - global health metrics ===
With the launch of the new journal, Igor Rudan extended the CHERG work to non-communicable diseases through establishing a global academic collaboration - Global Health Epidemiology Reference Group (GHERG). He assembled and lead the "CHI Consortium" (CHI = China Health Information) and studied reports of Chinese researchers stored in searchable electronic databases in Chinese. He was also a co-developer of GATHER guidelines (Guidelines for Accurate and Transparent Health Estimates Reporting). Notable results of GHERG include the first estimates of child mortality causes in China and dementia prevalence in China, and the global epidemiological estimates for peripheral artery disease (PAD), carotid atherosclerosis and chronic obstructive pulmonary disease (COPD), aortic aneurysms, hypertension in children, H. pylori infection in children, asthma, attention deficit and hyperactivity disorder, vitamin A deficiency, accidents and injuries, sickle cell disease, inborn errors of metabolism, type 1 diabetes, and many others.

=== International Society of Global Health - co-founder and inaugural President ===
In 2019, Igor Rudan co-founded the International Society of Global Health (ISoGH) and was elected the inaugural President. The society aims to promote global health as a field of scientific research and health care practice nationally and internationally. It produces and disseminates information relating to global health research and practice. Also, it trains and expands the general pool of professionals skilled in global health research and practice.

== Career in public communication of science ==
In 2016, Rudan became a science communicator. Since 2016, he published over 250 columns to popularize science for the Croatian newspaper Vecernji list and further 10 for the Croatian online news portal Index.hr. He also published over 40 long reads in English for Medium.com to popularise global health topics. Supported by The Wellcome Trust and BBC Scotland, he developed a documentary series called Survival: The Story of Global Health (2017). Simultaneously, he wrote a 4-book popular scienceseries Tetralogy on the 21st century, which contained the books The Exact Colour of the Sky (2017), Evil Air (2018), In the Land of Clans (2019) and Awaiting Fires (2020).

== Role in COVID-19 pandemic response ==
During the COVID-19 pandemic, Igor Rudan was engaged as a scientific adviser to the Government of Croatia in planning the COVID-19 response in Croatia, and as a science communicator writing columns about the pandemic for Vecernji list. He was also asked to provide expert commentary for international media outlets, including BBC News, CNN, Financial Times, The Wall Street Journal, USA Today, The Guardian and others.

He was an Editor-in-Chief of the Journal of Global Health, where many reports on the national-level response to COVID-19 were reviewed and published. As a member of the Early Pandemic Evaluation and Enhanced Surveillance of COVID-19 (EAVE II) group, he also wrote a number of editorials and co-authored research articles on COVID-19 pandemic.

== Awards and recognitions ==
- 2005 - National Science Award, The Parliament of the Republic of Croatia
- 2012 - Chancellor's Award for Research
- 2015–present - Clarivate Analytics / Web of Science's Highly Cited Researcher (Top 0.1% in the World by Citations)
- 2016 - Fellow of the Royal Society of Edinburgh (FRSE)
- 2017 -19 - Listed among "100 Most Powerful Croatians"
- 2019 - Principal's Medal for Outstanding Service
- 2022 - Elected Member of the Academia Europaea (MAE)
- 2022, 2025 - "Best Scientist" by Research.com – listed among world's top 1,000 scientists based on Microsoft Academic (Knowledge) Graph (MAKG)
- 2023 - Elected Member of the European Academy of Sciences and Arts (EASA)
- 2023 - Elected Member and Laureate for the Year 2023, International Academy of Sciences and Arts of Bosnia and Herzegovina
- 2023 - Mary Somerville Medal from the Royal Society of Edinburgh - as a member of the EAVE II collaboration for generating scientific analyses and insights that have supported evidence-informed policy and public health response throughout the COVID-19 pandemic

== Television ==
In 2017, Rudan co-developed a documentary series on global health called Survival: The Story of Global Health. He wrote the script and narrated the series. The series has 10 episodes and lasts for about 2 hours. It was then broadcast on Channel 1 of Croatian National Television in October and November 2018 and it cumulatively attracted 1.4 million viewers.

== Newspaper columns on popular science ==
- 2017-18 - Vecernji list - "21st Century" - a series of 52 columns (in Croatian)
- 2018-19 - Vecernji list - "Human Organism" - a series of 28 columns (in Croatian)
- 2019 - Index.hr - "(Non)-Sustainability of the World" - a series of 10 columns (in Croatian)
- 2020 - Vecernji list - "Survival: A Story of Global Health" - a series of 17 columns (in Croatian)
- 2020-2021 - Vecernji list - "Wave after wave: A story of COVID-19 pandemic" - a series of 45 columns (in Croatian)
- 2021-2022 - Vecernji list - "Project Radar: Career choice in the 21st century" - a series of 20 interviews (in Croatian)
- 2023-2024 - Vecernji list - "Thus spoke Tesla" - a series of 68 columns (in Croatian)
- 2020–present - Medium.com - >40 long reads on global health topics (in English)

== Books ==
- Smoljanović M, Smoljanović A, Rudan I (2009): Croatian Island Populations in 2001. Zagreb: LaserPlus, pp. 1–577. (in English) ISBN 978-953-97739-9-9
- Rudan I, Sridhar D (2015): Healthy ideas: Improving global health and development in the 21st century. Edinburgh: JoGH, pp. 1–440. (in English) ISBN 978-0-9933638-0-1
- Rudan I, Chan KY, Campbell H, Guo Y (2019, Editors): Elevation: Understanding China's Health Transition in the 21st Century. Edinburgh: JoGH, pp. 1–509 (in English) ISBN 978-1-9999564-8-6
- Rudan I. Survival: A Story of Global Health. Edinburgh: JoGH, 2021; pp. 1–132. (in English) ISBN 978-1-9999564-3-1
- Rudan I: Evil Air: A Story of Medicine. Edinburgh: Inishmore, 2022; pp. 1–226. (in English) ISBN 978-1-9999564-6-2
- Rudan I, Yoshida S, Wazny K, Cousens S (Eds): Measuring ideas: The CHNRI method. A solution for setting research priorities. Edinburgh: JoGH, 2022; pp. 1–384; (in English) ISBN 978-1-9999564-7-9
- Rudan I, Balaji L, Campbell H, Chopra M. Global Health Economics: The EQUIST and PATHS Tools. Edinburgh: International Society of Global Health, 2023, pp. 1–135. (in English) ISBN 978-1-7385104-0-5.
- Rudan I, Adeloye D, Song P (Eds). Global health metrics: The GHERG approach. Edinburgh: International Society of Global Health, 2024, pp. 1–261. (In English) ISBN 978-1-7385104-1-2
- Rudan I: The Breeze: A Story of Exploration, Art, Love and Faith. Edinburgh: International Society of Global Health, 2024, pp. 1–112. (in English) ISBN 978-1-9999564-6-2.
- Rudan I: Awaiting Fires: A Story of Sustainability. Edinburgh: International Society of Global Health, 2024, pp. 1–122. (in English) ISBN 978-1-7385104-3-6
- Rudan I: Evil Air: A Story of Medicine, 2nd Edition. Edinburgh: International Society of Global Health, 2024, pp. 1–258. (in English) ISBN 978-1-7385104-6-7
- Rudan I: Thus Spoke Tesla: A Story of Genius. A New Look at the Life, Work, and Legacy of Nikola Tesla. Edinburgh: International Society of Global Health, 2025, pp. 1–478. (in English) ISBN 978-1-7385104-7-4

=== Books in Croatian ===
- Šamija M, Šarčević B, Rudan I (1997): Rijetki tumori (Uncommon tumors). Zagreb: Globus, pp. 1–235. (in Croatian). ISBN 953-167-097-8.
- Rudan I (1999). Mjesec improvizatora: roman. (Month of an Improviser: A novel). Med-Info Consulting, Zagreb, pp. 1–268. (in Croatian). ISBN 953-97982-0-5
- Vorko-Jović A, Strnad M, Rudan I (2010): Epidemiologija kroničnih nezaraznih bolesti (Epidemiology of chronic non-communicable diseases). Zagreb: Medicinska Naklada, pp. 1–296. (in Croatian). ISBN 978-953-176-480-3
- Rudan I (2017): Točna boja neba: Razmišljanja o znanosti u 21. stoljeću (The Exact Colour of the Sky: Thoughts on Science in the 21st Century). Zagreb: Naklada Ljevak, pp. 1–355 (in Croatian). ISBN 978-953-355-143-2
- Rudan I (2018): Zao zrak: Razmišljanja o zdravlju i bolesti u 21. stoljeću (Evil Air: Thoughts on Health and Disease in the 21st Century). Zagreb: Naklada Ljevak, pp. 1–451 (in Croatian). ISBN 978-953-355-197-5
- Rudan I (2019): U zemlji klanova: Razmišljanja o prilagodbi u 21. stoljeću (In the Land of Clans: Thoughts of Adaptation in the 21st Century). Zagreb: Naklada Ljevak, pp. 1–356 (in Croatian). ISBN 978-953-355-144-9
- Rudan I (2020): Očekujući vatre: Razmišljanja o izazovima u 21. stoljeću (Awaiting the Fires: Thoughts of the Challenges in the 21st Century). Zagreb: Naklada Ljevak, pp. 1–280 (in Croatian). ISBN 978-953-355-426-6
- Rudan I (2021): Povjetarac: roman (The Breeze: A novel). Vecernji list, Zagreb, pp. 1–101 (in Croatian). ISBN 978-953-280-356-3
- Rudan I, Rudan T, Skoko B, Klaric D. Projekt radar: Izbor karijere u 21. stoljeću (On the Radar: Career choice in the 21st century. Zagreb: Vecernji list, 2023., pp. 1–302. (In Croatian) ISBN 978-953-280-380-8
- Rudan I (2025). Tako je govorio Tesla: Novi pogled na život, djelo i nasljeđe Nikole Tesle. (Thus spoke Tesla: A new look at the life, work, and legacy of Nikola Tesla). Zagreb: LaserPLUS i Večernji list, 2023., pp. 1–445. (In Croatian) ISBN 978-1-7385104-6-7

== Personal life ==
Igor Rudan has dual Croatian and British citizenship and is married to Tonkica Rudan. He has two children.
