= WHO-CHOICE =

World Health Organization initiative

WHO-CHOICE (CHOosing Interventions that are Cost-Effective) is an initiative started by the World Health Organization in 1998 to help countries choose their healthcare priorities. It is an example of priority-setting in global health. It was one of the earliest projects to perform sectoral cost-effectiveness analyses (i.e., cost-effectiveness analyses that compare a wide range of types of spending within a sector and prioritize holistically) on a global scale. Findings from WHO-CHOICE have shaped the World Health Report of 2002, been published in the British Medical Journal in 2012, and been cited by charity evaluators and academics alongside DCP2 and the Copenhagen Consensus.

== History ==
=== Launch and initial years of WHO-CHOICE ===
In May 1998, Gro Harlem Brundtland succeeded Hiroshi Nakajima as the Director-General of the World Health Organization, and the organization was significantly restructuring as a result of the leadership change. With her election, a new program, called Choosing Interventions: Effectiveness Quality, Costs, Gender and Ethics, was launched as part of the Global Programme for Evidence on Health and Policy. The name of the program would later morph into WHO-CHOICE.

=== Subsequent use ===
WHO-CHOICE was used in the World Health Report of 2002, specifically informing the recommendations in Chapter 5.

Results based on WHO-CHOICE were published in a series of papers in the British Medical Journal in 2012.

== Tools and methods ==
=== Adoption of sectoral CEA ===
Prior to WHO-CHOICE, most projects that did cost-effectiveness analysis (CEA) in the real world focused on evaluating a single program or intervention, comparing it against either a fixed price threshold or an existing array of interventions with predetermined cost-effectiveness taken from the literature. However, theoretical literature on CEAs considered a broader kind of CEA called "sectoral CEA" where all programs and interventions available within a sector would be compared and cost-effectiveness priorities would be determined. Prior to WHO-CHOICE, there were only a few examples of practical implementation of sectoral CEAs: the Oregon Health Services Commission (tasked with prioritizing for Medicaid in the United States), the World Bank Health Sectors Priorities Review, and the Harvard Life Saving Project. Of these, only the World Bank's work had attempted a global comparison. In a 2000 paper discussing the WHO-CHOICE approach, Murray et al. identified four challenges to a wider application of sectoral CEA:

1. Resource allocation decisions affecting the entire health sector must also take into account social concerns, such as priority for the sick, reducing social inequalities in health, or the well-being of future generations. The history of the Oregon Health Services Commission provides an example of the sort of conflicts that emerge as a result of balancing all these concerns.
2. Current CEA is too focused on the evaluation of new strategies, rather than identifying potential for efficiency improvements by reallocating within existing strategies.
3. For all but the richest societies, the cost and time required to evaluate the large set of interventions required may be prohibitive.
4. It is difficult to institutionalize CEA, and a number of conflicting CEA guidelines at national and regional levels have proliferated.

=== Use of generalized CEA (a type of sectoral CEA) based on epidemiological subregions ===
WHO-CHOICE identified a key trade-off in sectoral CEA based on the granularity of the region at which the CEA was performed. At one extreme, sectoral CEA could be performed at the level of individual cities or districts, incorporating information about local resources, costs, and current context. At the other extreme, a single CEA could be carried out globally. Highly localized sectoral CEA would be very expensive and difficult to perform whereas global CEA would fail to take into account the huge differences between the epidemiology and resource structure of regions.

WHO-CHOICE's solution was to use an intermediate level of granularity, that it called "generalized CEA" (GCEA). It argued that at this intermediate level, it could conduct CEAs more efficiently while also allowing local policymakers and agents to use its findings and further adapt them to local contexts.

WHO-CHOICE has divided the world into 14 epidemiological subregions, and publishes its findings by subregion, as shown below. Each subregion is a combination of a region (a geographical region of the world) and a mortality stratum (a stratum describing the level and nature of mortality). WHO-CHOICE chose to put each country in a single mortality stratum and a single region (and therefore a single subregion) even if mortality varies widely within the country.

- There are 6 regions: AFR (Africa), AMR (Americas), EMR (Middle East), EUR (Europe), SEAR (South-East Asia), and WPR (West Pacific).
- There are 5 mortality strata, defined as follows:
  - A = very low rates of adult and child mortality
  - B = low adult mortality, low child mortality
  - C = high adult mortality, low child mortality
  - D = high adult mortality, high child mortality
  - E = very high adult mortality, high child mortality

Although the 6 regions and 5 mortality strata could give a theoretical maximum of 6 X 5 = 30 subregions, only 14 subregions occur in practice because not every region has countries with all mortality strata.

Below is the classification into subregions as of 2003.

Region	Mortality stratum	Countries
AFR	D	Algeria, Angola, Benin, Burkina Faso, Cameroon, Cape Verde, Chad, Comoros, Equatorial Guinea, Gabon, Gambia, Ghana, Guinea, Guinea-Bissau, Liberia, Madagascar, Mali, Mauritania, Mauritius, Niger, Nigeria, Sao Tome and Principe, Senegal, Seychelles, Sierra Leone, Togo
AFR	E	Botswana, Burundi, Central African Republic, Congo, Côte d'Ivoire, Democratic Republic Of The Congo, Eritrea, Ethiopia, Kenya, Lesotho, Malawi, Mozambique, Namibia, Rwanda, South Africa, Swaziland, Uganda, United Republic of Tanzania, Zambia, Zimbabwe
AMR	A	Canada, United States of America, Cuba
AMR	B	Antigua and Barbuda, Argentina, Bahamas, Barbados, Belize, Brazil, Chile, Colombia, Costa Rica, Dominica, Dominican Republic, El Salvador, Grenada, Guyana, Honduras, Jamaica, Mexico, Panama, Paraguay, Saint Kitts and Nevis, Saint Lucia, Saint Vincent And The Grenadines, Suriname, Trinidad And Tobago, Uruguay, Venezuela
AMR	D	Bolivia, Ecuador, Guatemala, Haiti, Nicaragua, Peru
EMR	B	Bahrain, Cyprus, Iran, Jordan, Kuwait, Lebanon, Libyan Arab Jamahiriya, Oman, Qatar, Saudi Arabia, Syrian Arab Republic, Tunisia, United Arab Emirates
EMR	D	Afghanistan, Djibouti, Egypt, Iraq, Morocco, Pakistan, Somalia, Sudan, Yemen
EUR	A	Andorra, Austria, Belgium, Croatia, Czech Republic, Denmark, Finland, France, Germany, Greece, Iceland, Ireland, Israel, Italy, Luxembourg, Malta, Monaco, Netherlands, Norway, Portugal, San Marino, Slovenia, Spain, Sweden, Switzerland, United Kingdom
EUR	B	Albania, Armenia, Azerbaijan, Bosnia and Herzegovina, Bulgaria, Georgia, Kyrgyzstan, Poland, Romania, Slovakia, Tajikistan, Macedonia, Serbia and Montenegro, Turkey, Turkmenistan, Uzbekistan
EUR	C	Republic of Moldova, Russian Federation, Ukraine
SEAR	B	Indonesia, Sri Lanka, Thailand
SEAR	D	Bangladesh, Bhutan, North Korea, India, Maldives, Myanmar, Nepal
WPR	A	Australia, Japan, Brunei Darussalam, New Zealand, Singapore
WPR	B	Cambodia, China, Lao People's Democratic Republic, Malaysia, Mongolia, Philippines, Republic Of Korea, Viet Nam, Cook Islands, Fiji, Kiribati, Marshall Islands, Micronesia, Nauru, Niue, Palau, Papua New Guinea, Samoa, Solomon Islands, Tonga, Tuvalu, Vanuatu

=== Modifications to ICM-CEA to use null set as comparator for interventions ===
The CEA done by WHO-CHOICE differed from the standard ICM-CEA in two important ways:

1. Interventions were compared against the null set of interventions, rather than the existing backdrop of interventions. This provides a complete cost-effectiveness analysis that can be adapted more easily to different subregions and different times.
2. Results are presented in a single league table. For each set of mutually exclusive interventions (between which a selection is being made), the intervention with the lowest average cost-effectiveness with respect to the null set is presented first. If there are two or more rows, the second intervention is the one with the lowest slope with respect to the internvention with the lowest CE, and so on. Essentially, this identifies the principal components for the best intervention.

=== Intended usage ===
The results that WHO-CHOICE reports are not intended to be applied literally when choosing policies or selecting interventions. This is for a few reasons:

- The interventions available in a specific local context, as well as the cost and effectiveness estimates, may vary between contexts. Some interventions covered by WHO-CHOICE may not exist in the local context, and other interventions available in the local context may not be covered by WHO-CHOICE.
- The model does not fully capture all the real-world interactions and phenomena. For instance, transition costs are not modeled separately.
- The ranking of interventions by cost-effectiveness could be fairly non-robust, with huge margins of error making the ranking uncertain.

Rather, the results are intended to be used as a starting point in classifying interventions as highly cost-effective, moderately cost-effective, and cost-ineffective. With this classification in place, a more detailed and localized analysis can be done for the highly cost-effective interventions, incorporating concerns such as poverty, equity, implementation capacity, and feasibility.

=== Tools used for the estimates ===
WHO-CHOICE lists the following tools that it uses and can provide to researchers interested in using WHO-CHOICE:

- PopMod simulates the time evolution of an arbitrary population subject to births, deaths, and two distinct disease conditions. It has yearly granularity and keeps track of population by age and sex. A research paper describing PopMod called it the first multi-state dynamic life table, and highlighted how it modeled multiple diseases with interaction terms.
- CEA country contextualization templates: These templates help contextualize WHO-CHOICE's results (that are provided at the level of epidemiological subregion) to specific countries based on estimated information about population and costs in the country, that is pre-populated into the tool.
- CostIt (Costing Intervention Templates) is a software for the recording and analysis of cost data. It is not a data-collection tool but can guide the development of instruments for collecting data. Its main value add is in automating the computation of the economic costs of intervention, though it can also be used to compute financial costs. One feature of CostIt is that it automatically adjusts for capacity utilization, and therefore, comes to different conclusions based on different levels of capacity utilization: for instance, it would come to different conclusions if the hospital bed occupancy rate were 30% than if it were 80%.
- MCLeague (Monte Carlo League) is a software program that represents uncertainty around costs and effects to decision-makers in the form of stochastic league tables. It provides information on the probability that any given intervention is in the optimal intervention mix for a given level of resource availability. The program also allows for covariance between costs and outcomes.

== Results ==
This section focuses on results published by the WHO-CHOICE team or other material published by the World Health Organization relying on WHO-CHOICE data. For examples of use of WHO-CHOICE data by others, see the Reception section.

=== World Health Report of 2002 ===
The World Health Report of 2002 relied on WHO-CHOICE. Specifically, it used the division of the world into epidemiological subregions in its analysis of health risks, and used recommendations generated by WHO-CHOICE in Chapter 5, "Some Strategies to Reduce Risk". Here are the key results in the report based on WHO-CHOICE:

Risk being considered	Potential interventions	Conclusion about best intervention
Childhood undernutrition (and breastfeeding)	Complementary feeding Complementary feeding with growth monitoring and promotion	Both interventions have identical impact, and the latter is cheaper, and more likely to be cost-effective in most regions.
Iron deficiency	Iron fortification Iron supplementation	Supplementation yields greater improvements in population health in subregions with high child mortality (all D and E subregions) and at all levels of coverage. On the other hand, fortification is the preferred option at low levels of resource availability, as it has lower and less sharpy increasing unit cost and does not require a visit to a provider. However, in some settings, fortification is hindered by the absence of ideal food vehicles to fortify, and supplementation could be the better approach.
Vitamin A deficiency	Vitamin A supplementation Vitamin A fortification	Vitamin A fortification is more cost-effective in all regions because of its lower cost. Supplementation has a higher population benefit despite the higher cost. Both interventions are cost-effective.
Zinc deficiency	Zinc supplementation Zinc fortification	Fortification is more cost-effective. However, it has lower total population benefit than Vitamin A supplementation in subregions where both Vitamin A deficiency and zinc deficiency are problems.
Other individual-based interventions focusing on children under five years of age	Oral rehydration therapy Case management of pneumonia	Vitamin A supplementation achieves greater health effects than ORT in some areas (AMR-B, SEAR-B, WPR-B) but in others the reverse is true. Both ORT and case management of pneumonia achieve substantially greater benefits than zinc fortification and supplementation, though the latter is more cost-effective.
Blood pressure (hypertension)	Population wide salt reductions Individual-based hypertension treatment and education	In all subregions, strategies to reduce blood pressure are very cost-effective. Legislation is potentially more cost-effective than voluntary agreement with industry. Strategies to reduce blood pressure by treating individuals with a blood pressure with a SBP greater than 160mmHg are the most cost-effective, and lowering the threshold to 140mmHg is not cost-effective in many subregions such as AFR-D and AMR-D. Combinations of individual treatment and population based approaches are cost-effective at the 160mmHg SBP threshold in all settings.
Cholesterol	Population-wide health education through mass media Individual-based treatment and education	In all subregions, population strategies to reduce cholesterol are very cost-effective, but the total impact on DALYs gained is small. Statins are low-cost and effective and thus cost-effective in all regions.
Combined interventions to reduce the risk of cardiovascular events	Individual-based treatment and education for systolic blood pressure and cholesterol Population-wide combination of interventions to reduce hypertension and cholesterol. Absolute risk approach: focus on the absolute risks of individuals and choose medication based on that Combining population interventions and the absolute risk approach	The absolute risk approach for a threshold of 35% is very cost-effective in all subregions. At lower thresholds, the health benefits increase but so do the costs. The threshold for cost-effectiveness can vary based on region, and can vary from 5% to 25%.
Unsafe sex and HIV/AIDS	Population-wide mass media Voluntary counseling and testing School-based AIDS education Peer outreach for men who have sex with men Treatment of sexually transmitted infections (STI); Mother-to-child transmission (MTCT); Antiretroviral therapy (ARV); Intervention combinations	All preventive interventions have a substantial impact on population health in the high mortality subregions. The specific intervention that is best varies with the setting. Treatment of STIs has a higher impact on population health than the other preventive interventions in all except the A subregions where peer outreach for men who have sex with men also has a substantial impact.
Smoking	Taxation; Clean indoor air laws in public places Comprehensive bans on tobacco advertising Information dissemination through health warning labels, counter-advertising, and consumer information packages. Nicotine replacement therapy	The interventions have a larger impact in subregions with more tobacco use (AMR-B, AMR-D, EUR-B, EUR-C, SEAR-B, SEAR-D, WPR-B). If only one intervention is to be chosen, it should be taxation.
Unsafe water, sanitation, and hygiene	Millennium Development Goals; Disinfection at point of use Improved water supply and sanitation, low technologies Improved water supply and sanitation, with disinfection at point of use Improved water supply and sanitation, high technologies	In subregions other than EUR-A and AMR-A (where almost everybody has access to safe water and basic sanitation), the intervention that is consistently the most cost-effective is the provision of disinfection capacity at the point of use. However, the principal driver for improvement to water supplies is not health but economic development, and this should be factored into the evaluation.
Unsafe health care injections	Decreased reuse of injected equipment without sterilization Decreased unnecessary use of injections	Interventions were not evaluated in A subregions. In other mortality strata, reducing unnecessary use of injections has a lower total impact of health, and the impact of the interventions is additive. In approximately half the subregions (AMR-B, AMR-D, EUR-B, EUR-C), reducing reuse is also the most cost-effective intervention. In other regions (AFR-D, AFR-E, EMR-D, SEAR-B, SEAR-D, WPR-B), behavioral interventions to reduce overuse are more cost-effective, and would be done first if resources are scarce.

=== Report on scaling up Millennium Development Goals ===
The WHO-CHOICE database was one of the sources of data used for the 2009 World Health Organization costing report Constraints to Scaling Up the Health Millennium Development Goals: Costing and Financial Gap Analysis. Background Document for the Taskforce on Innovative International Financing and Health Systems (published 2010). The report was a costing analysis of health system strengthening in order to meet the Millennium Development Goals by 2015, and relied on WHO-CHOICE data and published WHO-CHOICE work for some specific cost estimates. It is cited on the WHO-CHOICE website as an example of the use of WHO-CHOICE to generate Global Price Tags.

=== Series of papers in the British Medical Journal in 2012 ===
In 2012, a number of papers were published in the British Medical Journal disseminating results from WHO-CHOICE. A discussion of the findings on the Giving What We Can blog summarized the results as follows: "countries should try to expand high-priority interventions to near-universal coverage before considering second-priority interventions on a limited scale." Below are the main results:

Problem area	Conclusion	Maximum incremental cost-effectiveness ratio (cost per DALY averted in 2005 international dollars) (Africa)	Maximum incremental cost-effectiveness ratio (cost per DALY averted in 2005 international dollars) (Asia)	Intervention (Africa)	Intervention (Asia)
Breast cancer, cervical cancer, colorectal cancer	Highly effective interventions are available; in colorectal cancer, increased overage is effective across regions	307	142	For cervical cancer: screening 50% of the target population through a single smear test at age 40, with lesion removal and treatment as required	Same as for Africa
Cardiovascular disease, diabetes, and tobacco use	Inexpensive and cost-effective interventions exist in low resource settings. These include strategies to reduce tobacco demand and retinopathy screening.	104	81	Preventive multridrug treatment for people with > 35% risk of a cardiovascular event in the following 10 years	Long term diuretic treatment after myocardial infarction patients with established heart failure
Chronic obstructive pulmonary disease and asthma	It is irreversible: current treatment options produce relatively little gains	2686	2420	Low dose inhaled corticosteroids for mild, persistent asthma	Same as for Africa
Vision and hearing loss	Vision and hearing impairment controls are generally cost effective	16	14	Treatment of chronic otitis with topical antibiotics at 50% coverage	Same as for Africa
Neuropsychiatric conditions	Highly variable cost-effectiveness across 44 assessed intervention strategies	117	286	Increased taxation on alcohol (current tax rate + 50%)	Older antiepileptic drug in primary care at 50% coverage
Road traffic injuries		10 year transition model: 1233	10 year transition model: 1181	Bicycle helmet use	Speed limits, drunk driving, seatbelt use, motorcycle helmet use

== Reception ==
Charity evaluator GiveWell has referenced WHO-CHOICE estimates alongside estimates from the Disease Control Priorities Project's DCP2 report, the Copenhagen Consensus, and The Lancet series on nutrition.

Giving What We Can, a charity evaluator and advocate of more effective giving, reviewed WHO-CHOICE's results, and emphasized that these results "should perhaps not be taken from the individual donor’s perspective, but rather from the perspective of someone who can influence the health system of that country." GWWC has also referenced WHO-CHOICE and compared it with DCP2 in some of its coverage of diseases.

WHO-CHOICE has also been cited alongside DCP2 and the Copenhagen Consensus in general discussions of cost-effectiveness analyses.

== See also ==
- Disease Control Priorities Project
- Copenhagen Consensus
- Priority-setting in global health
- World Health Report
