= Health policy and systems research =

Study of the societal organisation for achieving collective health goals

Health policy and systems research (HPSR) is a field of inquiry that studies "how societies organize themselves in achieving collective health goals, and how different actors interact in the policy and implementation processes to contribute to policy outcomes". HPSR is interdisciplinary and brings together expertise in biomedical and social sciences such as economics, sociology, anthropology, political science, public health and epidemiology.

== History and development ==
The Commission on Health Research for Development and the Ad Hoc Committee on Health Research (1996) both highlighted the urgent need for focusing research methods, funding and practice towards addressing health inequities and embracing inter-disciplinary and intersectoral thinking. These reports and other academic and activist voices linked to them argued for greater voice and participation of developing countries in defining research priorities. In 1997, at the Lejondal Meeting in Stockholm with senior scientists including Göran Tomson, policymakers and representatives of various agencies with a stake in HPSR, an Interim Board for an Alliance was proposed. Since then, the creation of the Alliance for Health Policy and Systems Research in 2000 and of Health Systems Global in 2012 have consolidated the practice community of HPSR. In 2010, the first global symposium on health systems research was held in Montreux. PLoS Medicine commissioned three articles on the state-of-the-art in HPSR authored by a diverse group of global health academics. These articles critically examined the status of HPSR, current challenges and mapped the need to build capacity in HPSR and support local policy development and health systems strengthening, especially in LMICs. The series positioned HPSR as a field of inquiry that is driven by the nature of research question as opposed to being guided by the research methods.

== Key concepts and themes ==
HPSR can be distinguished from related fields of inquiry such as health services research from particular focus on wider systemic, structural and societal phenomena. The key concepts and themes in HPSR include the treatment of health systems as Complex adaptive system, a focus on governance and stewardship of health systems (as opposed to focusing on individual health behaviours), an intent to create knowledge for health equity and social justice, pursuing people-centred and community-oriented healthcare, focusing on Implementation research, exploring the role of power using political economy approaches, studying systems phenomena such as resilience and responsiveness, using participatory action research to co-produce research and action and adopting a learning health systems approach.

== Methods and approaches ==
Health Policy and Systems Research (HPSR) is defined by the questions it asks (typically on functioning, reform, and governance of health policy and systems) than by specific methodologies (it is methods agnostic). Researchers and practitioners use biomedical or social science research or practice approaches that are best fit for a given question including realist and theory-driven approaches, participatory action research, policy analysis, implementation research or any methodological approach that is best fit for the given HPSR question. The Alliance for Health Policy and Systems Research has produced methods readers and evidence synthesis guidelines for HPSR.

== Key organisations and initiatives ==
- WHO Alliance for Health Policy and Systems Research, Geneva, Switzerland
- Health Systems Global
