= International Decision Support Initiative =

The International Decision Support Initiative (iDSI) is a partnership between governments, universities, and thinktanks that helps health policy makers make better decisions. iDSI targets low- and middle-income countries (LMICs), helping them prioritize health interventions as a means toward universal health coverage. iDSI launched in November 2013 as the result of a 2012 Center for Global Development working group.

== Partnerships ==
The following organizations are iDSI's core partners:

- Global Health and Development Group (GHD)
- HITAP (Health Intervention and Technology Assessment Program, Thailand)
- Center for Global Development
- PRICELESS SA (Priority Cost Effective Lessons for System Strengthening, South Africa)

Other partners include Centre for Health Economics (at the University of York), Imperial College London, Itad, Johns Hopkins Berman Institute of Bioethics, the London School of Hygiene and Tropical Medicine, Meteos, Office of Health Economics, the University of Glasgow, and the University of Strathclyde.

== Funding ==
iDSI receives funding from the Bill & Melinda Gates Foundation, the UK Department for International Development, and the Rockefeller Foundation.

In December 2015, iDSI received $12.8 million in funding from the Bill & Melinda Gates Foundation for phase 2 of its operations.

== Work ==
iDSI has operated in China, India, Indonesia, Myanmar, the Philippines, South Africa, and Vietnam as "focus countries", but has also operated in additional countries.

Most of iDSI's work has focused on noncommunicable diseases, maternal and child death, and more general priority-setting.

As part of their focus on universal health care, iDSI has also worked on priority setting for mental health.

iDSI is one of the collaborators for DCP3.

== See also ==
- Innovative Vector Control Consortium
