= George Institute for Global Health =

Medical research institute

The George Institute for Global Health
- Established: 1999
- Mission: Improve the health of millions of people worldwide
- Principal Directors: Prof. Stephen MacMahon; Prof. Robyn Norton
- Location: Australia, India, United Kingdom
- Website: www.georgeinstitute.org

The George Institute for Global Health, is an independent medical research institute headquartered in Australia with offices in India and the United Kingdom. The George Institute conducts research on non-communicable disease, including heart and kidney disease, stroke, diabetes, and injury. The institute is known for conducting large-scale clinical studies. Between 1999 and 2017, the George has consumed over A$750 million in research grant and fundraising.

== History ==
The institute was founded by Stephen MacMahon and Robyn Norton, the George is affiliated with the universities of New South Wales, Peking, and Imperial College; having previously been affiliated with The University of Sydney between 1999 and 2017.

Notable researchers who were among the top 2% of those cited globally in 2019 are Simone Pettigrew, Meg Jardine, Pallab K Maulik and Soumyadeep Bhaumik. In 2022, they recognised Göran Tomson as a Distinguished Fellow for his contributions to health policy and systems research.
