= Health Metrics Network =

Global health partnership

- Abbreviation: HMN
- Established: May 2005
- Type: Global Partnership
- Headquarters: Geneva, Switzerland
- Executive Secretary ad interim: Dr. Marie-Paule Kieny, WHO Assistant Director-General

The Health Metrics Network (HMN) was a global health partnership focused on strengthening health information systems in low and middle income countries, launched in May 2005 during the 58th session of the World Health Assembly (WHA) and dissolved on 31 May 2013. Hosted by the World Health Organization (WHO) in Geneva, Switzerland, the HMN's stated purpose was to make available timely and accurate health information by encouraging joint funding and development of country health information systems, to improve health and save lives.

HMN also promoted research and technical innovation. Specifically, HMN pursued interrelated objectives as below:

- Setting up a framework for country health information system (HIS) development (the HMN Framework) which prescribes standards for health information systems;
- Recording every birth, death and cause of death (MOVE-IT for the MDGs);
- Developing methods to track progress in health information systems; and
- Ensuring access and use of information at all levels.

== Structure ==
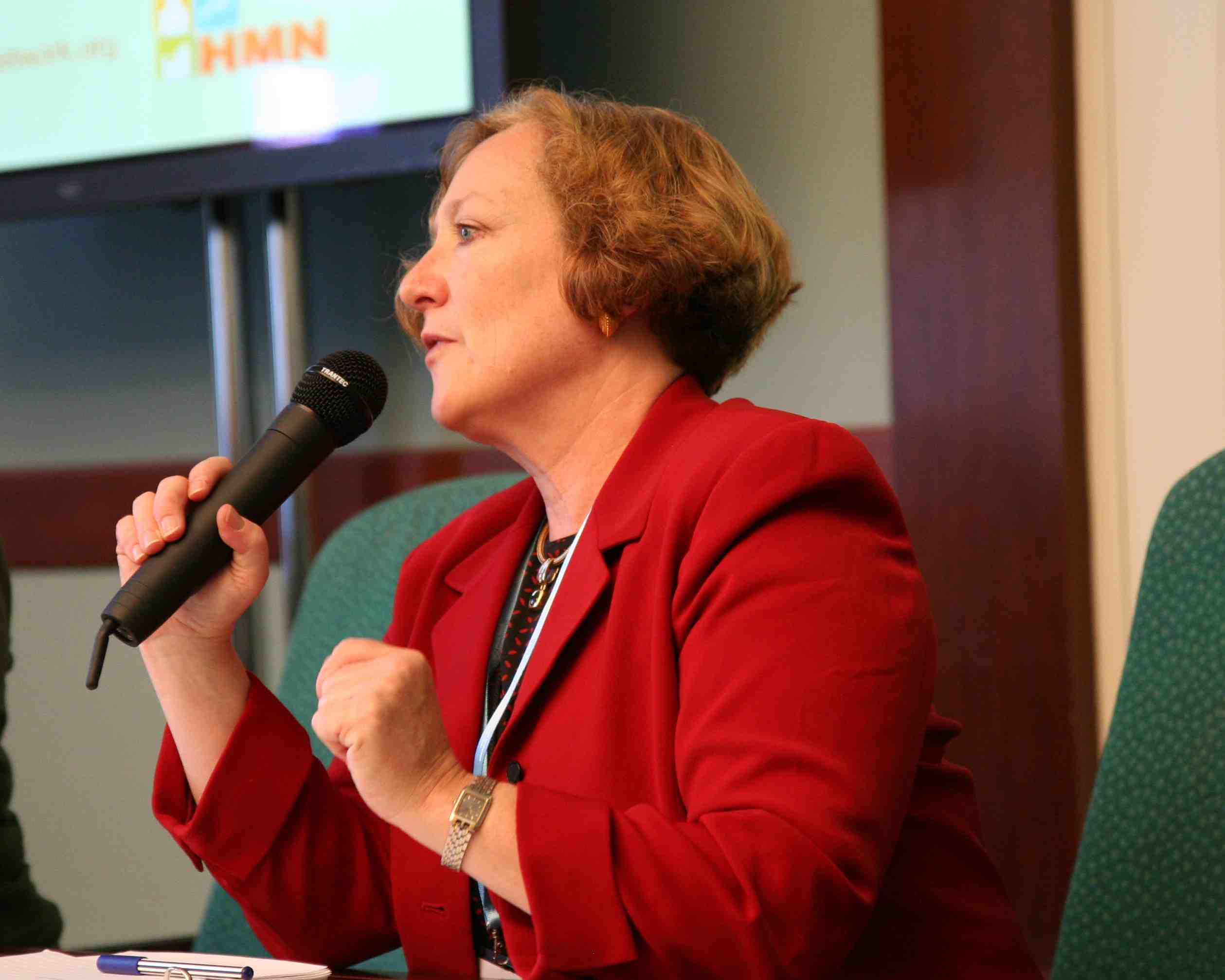
Sally Stansfield, Former Executive Secretary

HMN had an organizational structure composed of an Executive Board and a Secretariat. The HMN Executive Board coordinated the Network and made decisions; membership comprised key health information workers, including health and statistical experts, technical and development partners and funding agencies in developing and other countries.

The Secretariat supported HMN partners; it comprised an Executive Secretary, and core technical and administrative staff, based at the World Health Organization in Geneva, Switzerland.

== Achievements ==
- The HMN Framework and Standards for Country Health Information Systems was used by over 85 countries in all six WHO Regions to make an assessment of their health information systems. The HMN Framework was also used by partners such as the World Bank, Global Fund to Fight AIDS, Tuberculosis and Malaria, USAID, US Centers for Disease Control and Prevention and Africa Development Bank.
- The HMN Framework is credited for health information system-related improvements in terms of lives and money saved, and for cost-effectiveness. HMN has tracked and documented over US $500 million being associated with the improvements of country health information systems.
- In 2007, the World Health Assembly passed a resolution (WHA60.27) entitled Strengthening of health information systems. The resolution acknowledges that sound information is critical in framing evidence-based health policy and making decisions, and is fundamental for monitoring progress towards internationally agreed health-related development goals. The resolution urges Members States, all stakeholders and the WHO Director-General to take specific steps to support the strengthening of health information systems, given that such systems in most developing countries are weak.
- A joint initiative with The Lancet launched a successful global advocacy campaign on the monitoring of vital events in 2006. The published findings and ideas have since positively influenced advocacy efforts on the strengthening of civil registration and vital statistics strengthening in Africa and Asia in 2010 alone.
- HMN has helped foster a growing cluster of regional networks such as the Caribbean Group, an e-health network spearheaded by the Rockefeller Foundation, the m-health Alliance, and the West African Health Organization.
- The HMN Secretariat has provided assistance to several countries including Ethiopia, Belize, and Kenya, enabling them to secure financing from the Global Fund to strengthen health information systems.
  - Information-driven improvements have been achieved in countries. For example, in rural Western District, Sierra Leone where the percentage of women giving birth rose in 2009 from around 13% to nearly 60% due to a policy of free health services, information from a revitalized health information system was used to identify the problem of high maternal mortality, to understand contributing factors, to design a relevant intervention with active participation of clients, civil society, and district officials to track the effect of implementing the intervention.
  - In Belize, the percentage of HIV+ pregnant women receiving full prevention of mother to child transmission (PMTCT) went from just under 60% in 2006 to virtually 100% in the first half of 2008. Thanks to information system driven improvements, including a national electronic medical record system, HIV+ pregnant women are now readily identified and are closely followed with medical and psychosocial support. This has contributed to the virtual elimination of mother-to-child transmission of HIV in the country
- The HMN Secretariat introduced the formal practice of Enterprise Architecture to the domain of health information system's strategy, planning and design.

== Partners ==
HMN worked with and through partners, including countries, donors, development agencies and technical experts. By linking with other networks and partnerships involved in health information, such as RHINO and PARIS21, HMN extended its reach and both draws upon and contributes to such initiatives. By forging alliances with major consumers of health information, in particular global health initiatives such as The Global Fund to Fight AIDS, Tuberculosis and Malaria, Global Alliance for Vaccines and Immunization and the President's Emergency Plan for AIDS Relief, HMN worked to ensure that countries and programmes benefit from coherent and consistent technical support.

== Funding ==
HMN received an initial grant of US$50 million awarded by the Bill & Melinda Gates Foundation in 2004, and additional contributions from donors including: Danish International Development Agency (DANIDA), European Commission, Netherlands Ministry of Foreign Affairs, Paris 21, Rockefeller Foundation, Systems Research Institute of Thailand, United Kingdom Department for International Development (DFID), United States Agency for International Development (USAID), United States Centers for Disease Control and Prevention (CDC) and World Bank.

== Dissolution ==
Subsequent to the preparation of the report by the Secretariat contained in EB132/5Add.1 (“WHO’s arrangement for hosting health partnerships and proposals for harmonizing WHO’s work with hosted partnerships”), the Executive Board of the Health Metrics Network decided on 8 November 2012 to dissolve the Network. The Network's operations ceased on 31 May 2013.

== Notes ==
- World Health Assembly: Strengthening of health information systems, Resolution WHA60.27, 2007. (p. 100).
- Accessed June 6, 2011.
