= Soumyadeep Bhaumik =

Indian scientist

- Citizenship: Indian
- Education: Bankura Sammilani Medical College; Liverpool School of Tropical Medicine; University of New South Wales
- Known for: Advocacy leading to change in national COVID-19 treatment guidelines in India; and setting up first Rapid Evidence Synthesis Unit in India
- Scientific career
- Fields: Evidence synthesis, health policy, snakebite,
- Workplaces: George Institute for Global Health; Public Health Foundation of India
- Thesis: Addressing the burden of snakebite: analysing policy prioritisation, evaluating health systems, and fostering research on treatments

Soumyadeep Bhaumik is an Indian medical doctor and public health researcher who heads the Meta-research and Evidence Synthesis Unit in George Institute for Global Health. In 2021, Bhaumik and other scientists successfully advocated for the removal of convalescent plasma from COVID-19 treatment guidelines through an open letter to the Principal Scientific Advisor, Government of India. He is among top 2% of most cited researchers globally in field of general and internal medicine. Bhaumik is also Associate Editor, BMJ Global Health and Academic Editor in PloS Neglected Tropical Diseases.

== Education ==
Bhaumik studied medicine in Bankura Sammilani Medical College, in West Bengal, India. He subsequently studied international public health in Liverpool School of Tropical Medicine in United Kingdom. He received his Ph.D. in medicine from University of New South Wales Sydney . He received the Deans award for his PhD thesis on snakebite.

== Membership ==
Bhaumik is a life member of Indian Public Health Association, Indian Science Congress Association, and Academy of Family Physicians of India.He was Fellow of Royal Society of Arts in 2021-2022.
