= Health Systems Global =

Global society for health policy and systems research

- Abbreviation: HSG
- Formation: 2012; 14 years ago
- Type: Nonprofit
- Legal status: Society
- Purpose: Advancing research on health policy and systems
- Region served: Worldwide
- Chair of the Board: Tolib Mirzoev
- Website: healthsystemsglobal.org

Health Systems Global is a membership-based society that convenes researchers, policymakers and implementers from around the world to develop the field of health systems research.

== History ==
It emerged from a growing need to focus on the health systems performance in low- and middle-income countries. The society was established in 2012 and organizes a symposium every two years, with support from the Alliance for Health Policy and Systems Research and others, to bring together its members as well as other people and organisations involved in health systems and policy research.

== Global symposia ==
Since 2010, HSG has organized a global symposium every two years. Each symposium is co-hosted with a local organizing committee. A number of factors go into choosing the location for each symposium, but generally they rotate through different World Health Organization regions and should be as accessible as possible to the widest number of members in the society.

Each symposium results in a statement regarding the current state of the field of health policy and systems research.

=== Montreux, Switzerland – 2010 ===
The First Global Symposium on Health System Research was hosted in Montreux, Switzerland from 16 to 19 November 2010. The theme of the symposium was: 'Science to accelerate universal health coverage'. It was at the Montreux symposium that the need for a membership society was established, as outlined in the Montreux Statement.

=== Beijing, China – 2012 ===
The Second Global Symposium on Health Systems Research took place in Beijing, China from 31 October - 3 November 2012. For the second edition of the symposium, the focus was on: 'Inclusion and innovation towards universal health coverage'.

=== Cape Town, South Africa – 2014 ===
Cape Town, South Africa was the seat of the Third Global Symposium on Health Systems Research. It took place from 30 September - 3 October 2014 under the theme: 'Science and practice of people-centred health systems'.

=== Vancouver, Canada – 2016 ===
From 14 to 18 November 2016, members of Health Systems Global and other invitees gathered in Vancouver, Canada for the Fourth Global Symposium on Health Systems Research. This symposium focused on 'Resilient and responsive health systems for a changing world'

=== Liverpool, United Kingdom – 2018 ===
The Fifth Global Symposium on Health Systems Research was hosted by the city of Liverpool, United Kingdom from 8–12 October 2018. 'Advancing health systems for all in the SDG era' was the organizing theme of the symposium.

=== Dubai, United Arab Emirates – 2020 ===
The next iteration of the biennial Health Systems Research Symposium will take place in November 2020 in Dubai, United Arab Emirates. The theme was announced as 'Re-imagining health systems for better health and social justice'

=== Bogotá, Colombia – 2022 ===
The seventh Global Symposium on health systems research was held in Bogotá, Colombia in November 2022. The theme of the Symposium was Health Systems Performance in the Political Agenda: Sharing Lessons for Current and Future Global Challenges.

=== Nagasaki, Japan – 2024 ===
The 8th Global Symposium on Health Systems Research was held in Nagasaki, Japan in November 2024. The theme was building just and sustainable health systems: centering people and protecting the planet.

=== Dubai, United Arab Emirates – 2026 ===
The 9th Global Symposium on Health Systems Research is scheduled to take place in Dubai, UAE, in November 2026.
