= 10/90 gap =

Health statistic

The 10/90 gap is the term adopted by the Global Forum for Health Research to highlight the finding by the Commission on Health Research for Development in 1990, that less than 10% of worldwide resources devoted to health research were put towards health in Developing Countries, where over 90% of all preventable deaths worldwide occurred. Every year, the spread of disease suffered in both rich and poor countries converges. According to the World Health Organization (WHO), the most prevalent diseases consist of cardiovascular disease, cancer and diabetes. These diseases now account for 45% of the global health burden and are the culprit for up to 85% of deaths in low-income countries. The 10/90 Gap focuses on joining organizations together to reduce these statistics.

== Disease and the 10/90 gap ==
A substantial portion of diseases, most prevalent in impoverished or developing countries, are those which are preventable and/or treatable. The World Health Organization (2004) stated in their World Health Report that an estimated eight million individuals die prematurely, from diseases and conditions that can be cured, every year. These deaths contribute to approximately one third of all human deaths in the world, each year. Table 1 lists several of these curable diseases.

Table 1: Causes of avoidable deaths.

Conditions Leading to Avoidable Deaths	Deaths in 2002
Respiratory infections (mainly pneumonia)	3,963,000
HIV/AIDS	2,777,000
Perinatal conditions	2,462,000
Diarrhoea	1,798,000
Tuberculosis	1,566,000
Malaria	1,272,000
Childhood diseases (mainly measles)	1,124,000
Maternal conditions	510,000
Malnutrition	485,000
Sexually transmitted diseases	180,000
Meningitis	173,000
Hepatitis	157,000
Tropical diseases	129,000

== Strategies for change ==
Global health organisations across the globe have explicitly made research into health their priority. In 2000, World Health Organization established the Commission on Macroeconomics and Health, who in their 2001 report, verified the relationship between poverty and disease and discussed the benefit of investment on the economic climates of developing countries. Possible strategies that can be implanted to help reduce the 10/90 gap are, policies prioritizing funding for health research, also developing capacities of credible public and private health research institutions. Also, activities of international NGOs to undertake research aimed at resolving the gap, and the setting up of research based mechanisms to ensure access to new effective products for the treatment and prevention of poverty-related diseases. However, given the number of diseases that are preventable, other factors that are blocking the access of patients to these products, such as cost of treatments to the individual, also need to be addressed, rather than just focusing on developing new drugs. There is also a need to build the primary health care sector in developing countries. It has been shown that early detection and effective management of disease can be provided by appropriately-trained, non-physician, healthcare workers.

== Health expenditure ==
The gap between financial needs and financial means in low income countries can only be filled by donations. The average health expenditure per capita in western countries is estimated at $947 compared to $20 per capita in low income countries. To assist the world's poorest population, health expenditure between $44–60 per capita is placed as a target. This target is achieved by the contribution of 0.1% of advanced western countries gross national production (GNP) to fund global health, this recommendation was set by the WHO in 2001 and is estimated to save 8 million lives per year.

== Global research and development ==
Among other efforts to address this issue are recent proposals for a Global Research and Development (R&D) treaty, and the creation of the nonprofit pharmaceutical company OneWorld Health which develops new and affordable medicines for neglected diseases. A treaty creates a system that allows health research to come from contributions by all and therefore the sharing of benefits for all, improving the fairness and sustainability of global research and development. In a positive development for the closing of the gap, in the 2012 London Declaration on Neglected Tropical Diseases many parties, including governments, funding organisations and drug companies, agreed to work towards the eradication of neglected tropical diseases.

== Criticism ==
Some people believe the 10/90 gap is a myth because simple medicines to treat conditions such as diarrhea and malaria are available in developing countries. The efficacy of the medicines, however, can be undermined by barriers to access such as poverty, strict government regime and inadequate healthcare systems and infrastructure.

== See also ==
- Pareto principle
- Inequality
