= Child Health and Nutrition Research Initiative =

Founded in 2001, the Child Health Nutrition Research Initiative (CHNRI) is a network of interested partners supported by the Global Forum for Health Research, based in Geneva, Switzerland. CHNRI efforts support the Millennium Development Goals of:

- Eradicating extreme poverty and hunger
- Reducing child mortality
- Combating HIV/AIDS, malaria and diseases in children

CHNRI is helping to set research priorities in child health, development and nutrition, and resolve related methodological issues. It also sponsors research into priority child health and nutrition problems, especially in low- and middle-income countries, with a focus on research to inform policies for scaling up effective interventions.

CHNRI focuses on increasing the level of communication and discussion amongst players devoted to research on child health and nutrition; such as nutritionists, child health specialists, and child development specialists. It provides a platform to initiate and maintain debate on the importance and direction of the research, bringing scientists together and implementing bodies to discuss issues relevant to the current status of knowledge and the requirements for the future.

The secretariat of CHNRI is now located in The INCLEN Trust International. The board is chaired by Dr Robert E. Black, Professor and chair, Department of International Health, Johns Hopkins Bloomberg School of Public Health, United States.
