= Health Intervention and Technology Assessment Program =

Thai nonprofit organization

The Health Intervention and Technology Assessment Program

Overview of Organization
- Type: Research
- Field of Work: Health Technology Assessment
- Founded: 2007
- Headquarters: 6th Floor, 6th Building, Department of Health, Ministry of Public Health, Tiwanon Rd., Muang, Nonthaburi 11000
- Key Personnel: Yot Teerawattananon MD.PhD., Program Leader Sripen Tantivess PhD., Senior Researcher
- Research Areas: Health Technology Assessment, Economic Evaluations, Health Policy Analysis, HTA Infrastructure Development
- Funding Sources: Domestic Public Funding, International Donor Organizations

The Health Intervention and Technology Assessment Program (HITAP) is a semi-autonomous research unit under Thailand’s Ministry of Public Health. It was established in 2007 as a non-profit organization in order to take responsibility for appraising a wide range of health technologies and programs, including pharmaceuticals, medical devices, interventions, individual and community health promotion, and disease prevention as well as social health policy to inform policy decisions in Thailand. HITAP assumes an advisory role to health governmental authorities by providing rigorous scientific evidence through professional assessment of health data in support of public decision-making. These assessments cover a range of topics including system design, selection of technologies for assessment, and the actual assessment of those selected and agreed upon by relevant government agencies. In this effort, HITAP publishes research and studies in the following areas: methodological development, (HTA and cost) databases and guidelines; knowledge transfer and exchange (KTE) and capacity development; technology assessments on drugs, medical devices, medical procedures, disease prevention and health promotion measures; benefit packages of care – mixing screening and treatments; and other public health policies, e.g. evaluation of Thailand’s government compulsory license policy.

== Strategies ==
In operationalizing HITAP’s goals and in fulfilling its advisory role in the decision making process HITAP follows the five key strategies of having an 1) HTA Fundamental System; 2) strengthening Human Capacity; 3) HTA Research; 4) Knowledge Management; and 5) creating an HTA Network.

Having an HTA fundamental system entails basic research and development for HTA or the creation of infrastructure to support health intervention and technology assessment by developing standards that are on par with the international level whilst taking into account resource constraints in the Thai context. Under this strategy, methodological guidelines, a database of HTA studies in Thailand, tools and quality of life measures for cost-utility analysis, and a social value based threshold ceiling were developed.

== HTA in the public health system ==
The National Health Security Office, which institutes and manages the largest health plan in Thailand (Universal Coverage Scheme [UC]), initiated a collaborative research and development project with two independent research institutes – the Health Intervention and Technology Assessment Program and the International Health Policy Program – in 2009. The aim of the project was to develop an optimal strategy for the development of the UC benefit package, that is, to determine which interventions should be candidate for public reimbursement. The project is named research for development of health benefit package under the universal health care coverage scheme, or known as UCBP (see www.ucbp.net). The project incorporates multiple-criteria decision analysis (MCDA) and a deliberative process and multi stakeholders’ involvement to guide national-level priority setting in health care coverage decision. The review documented the experience of seven health technology assessment organizations in Canada, England and Wales, the United States, the Netherlands, Germany, Sweden and Spain, which all use an explicit process of priority setting. Its findings concluded that all these organizations consider multiple criteria, involved multiple stakeholders, and distinguish, in one way or another, four basic steps in their priority setting Process. These steps were then also applied in the Thai setting and included. The results of the review were adapted to the Thai setting, resulting in 4 steps of explicit priority setting including: 1) nomination of interventions for assessments, 2) selection of interventions for assessment, 3) technology assessment of interventions, and 4) appraisal of interventions. Since the beginning of the research project up to 119 topics have been proposed for inclusion into the benefit package, with 53 topics selected for further research or HTA analysis.

One of the benefit packages revised through UCBP is the development of a health screening package under the universal health coverage in 2010. Currently, the three public insurance schemes in Thailand offer different health screening packages. The study was designed as a response to requests from stakeholders including decision-makers and representatives from the general public, to develop an evidenced-based health screening package for the population that could ensure equitable access to essential health screening under the three schemes. The results led to advice against elements of current clinical practice, such as annual chest X-rays and particular blood test (e.g. kidney function test), and indicated that the introduction of certain new population-based health screening programs, such as for chronic hepatitis B, would provide substantial health and economic benefits to the Thais. The final results were presented to a wide group of stakeholders, including decision-makers at the Ministry of Public Health and the public health insurance schemes, to verify and validate the findings and policy recommendations. The package has been endorsed by the Thai UHC Benefit Package Committee for implementation in fiscal year 2016.

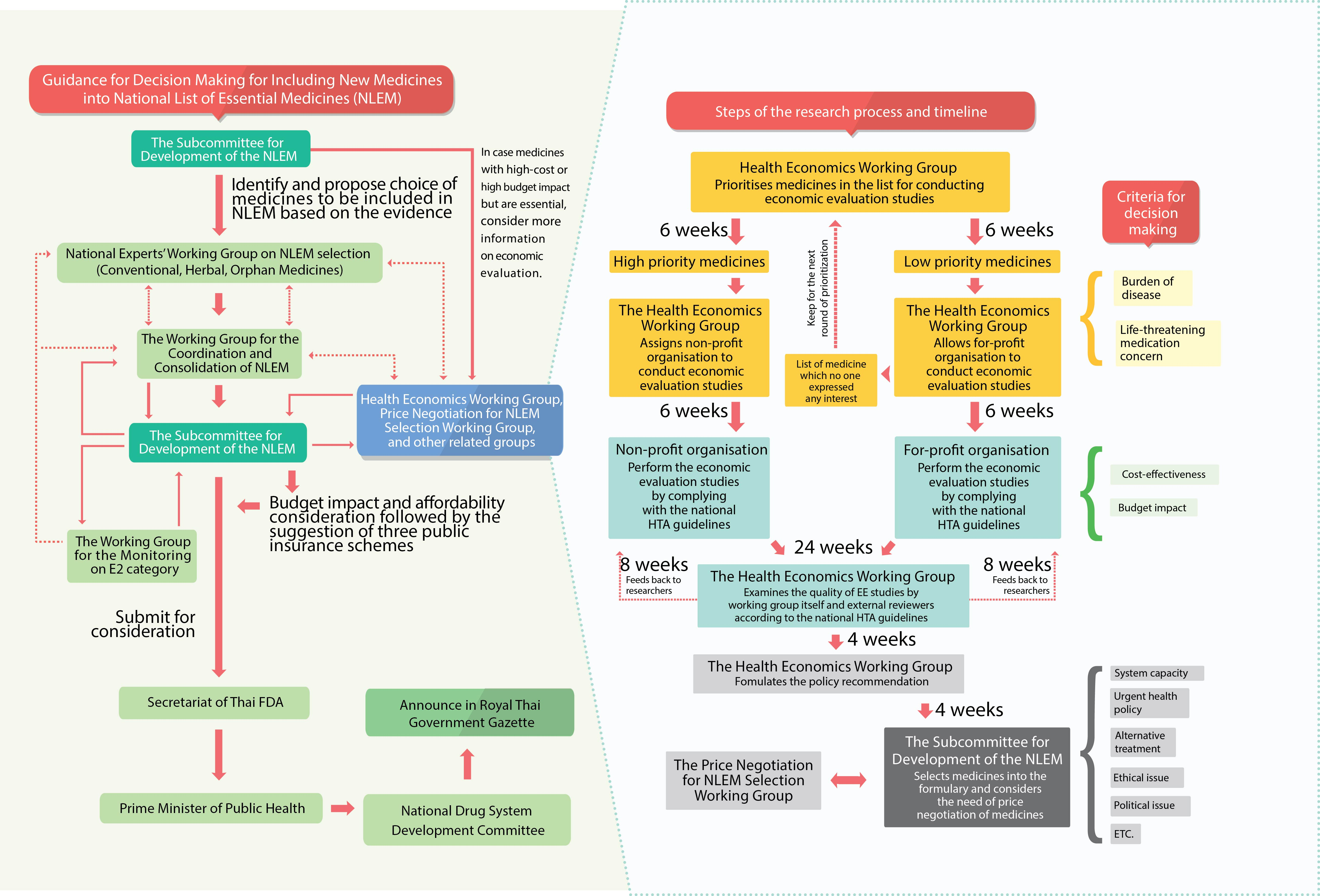
Thailand National List of Essential Medicines Process Flowchart.

In 1981, Thailand’s National List of Essential Medicines was created. Subsequently, in 1983, the Subcommittee for the Development of the National List of Essential Medicines who works in collaboration with the Food and Drug Administration as its secretariat. In the latter years, the function of the subcommittee became the maintenance of an optimal list of medicines, wherein the criteria for selection were cost, safety, efficacy and effectiveness of drugs. In each of these criteria, the subcommittee’s was to consider scientific evidence to determine which medicines are to be included in the list. Twenty-eight specialist working groups undertake the task of determining what should be on the list as well as informing price negotiations between manufacturers and the NLEM.

Increasingly, awareness and realization that the evidence required for optimal coverage decisions involved analyses in cost-effectiveness as a fifth criterion. In 2009, the Health Economics Working Group was established under the subcommittee. The working group was composed of health economists, representatives from the subcommittee, academics and representatives from the three health insurance schemes and the working group secretariat. In this process, HITAP in collaboration with the Food and Drug Administration was involved as the secretariat of the working group whose function was to generate procedures and assure quality of the evidence provided. The HEWG then prioritized the requests based on burden of disease, the risk to life and financial burden on households posed by the condition and social consideration and commissions the cost-effectiveness research from non-profit agencies (like HITAP).

== International work ==
In late 2013 in response to the increasing requests for involvement in international projects, HITAP created the HITAP International Unit in order to collaborate with international partners and networks working to improve health intervention and technology assessment (HITA) for Universal Health Care (UHC) and priority-setting capacity in low- and middle-income countries (LMICs). The HIU has previously worked with the National Center for Pharmaceutical Access and Management (NCPAM), Philippines, Health Technology Assessment Committee (HTAC), Indonesia, Health Systems and Policy Institute (HSPI), Vietnam, the International Decision Support Initiative (IDSI), UK and the National Institute for Health and Care Excellence International (NI), UK.

In the past HITAP has been instrumental in pushing HTA forward in international policy by becoming part of the delegation representing Thailand as sponsors and writers of several resolutions in the World Health Assembly (WHA) and the South-East Asia Regional Office (SEARO) of the World Health Organization (WHO), including:

- Health Intervention and Technology Assessment in Support of Universal Health Coverage Agenda. 15.7 A67/VR/9, WHA 67.23 24 May 2014.
- Health Intervention and Technology Assessment in Support of Universal Health Coverage. SEA/RC66/R4 May, 2014.

HITAP has also worked to establish regional collaboration amongst HTA units in Asia. Along with the National Evidence-based Health Care Collaborating Agency, South Korea (NECA) and the Center for Drug Evaluation, Taiwan (CDE), HITAP founded the HTAsiaLink Network in 2010. The network is a collaborative platform for knowledge sharing and best practices of HTA in the Asia-Pacific region. One of its many activities is the production of a biannual HTAsialink Newsletter and an Annual HTAsiaLink Conference held in different member countries in Asia. Currently the Network has 30 member organizations from 16 Countries.
