= Commission on Health Research for Development =

The Commission on Health Research for Development was an independent international initiative with the aim of improving health and development in developing countries. It was constituted in 1987 with 12 members and produced a report titled Health Research: Essential Link to Equity in Development published in 1990. The Commission began with the premise that research has the potential to contribute health and development, but the way it is financed, conducted and steered is not adequately addressing the needs of the most vulnerable populations and countries. The report proposed improvements in the way health research was being conducted to ensure maximum impact on health for all. The Commission was one of the first to recognise the global disparity in research funding and outputs which were predominantly focused on health problems of the affluent populations and countries. These efforts led to increasing focus on the 10/90 gap in health research priority setting in global health. The report also facilitated the setting of the Ad Hoc Committee on Health Research Relating to Future Intervention Options by the WHO in 1996. Among the 17 recommendations made by the Committee to help correct the 10/90 gap was the creation of the Global Forum for Health Research.

The Commission reviewed available information on health research and development, commissioned special papers, and held open consultation meetings in Germany, Zimbabwe, the United States, Mexico, India, Japan, France and Sweden. The participants in the consultations included health researchers, social activists, administrators, national and global policymakers, and representatives of international organisations including the WHO, UNICEF and the United Nations Development Programme (UNDP). The Commission produced 25 country reports, 10 Commission reports, 16 staff papers and 33 contributed papers.

The Commission had 12 members: John R Evans (Canada) chair, Gelia T. Castillo (Philippines) deputy-chair, Fazle Hasan Abed (Bangladesh), Sune D. Bergstrom (Sweden), Doris Howes Calloway (United States), Essmat S. Ezzat (Egypt), Demissie Habte (Ethiopia), Walter J. Kamba (Zimbabwe), Adetokunbo O. Lucas (Nigeria), Adolfo Martinez-Palomo (Mexico), Saburo Okita (Japan), V. Ramalingaswami (India). The Commission members' expertise included biomedical and social sciences, and included members of national governments, university academia and professionals in business, public health and law. Their work was funded by the German Development Agency, Edna McConnell Clark Foundation, Canadian government's International Development Research Centre with additional inputs from Academia de la Investigacion Cientifica (Mexico), Carnegie Corporation of New York (USA), Ford Foundation (USA), Foundation for Total Health Promotion (Japan), Nobel Assembly (Sweden), Oak Foundation (UK), Overseas Development Administration, Pew Charitable Trusts (USA), Rockefeller Foundation (USA), the Swedish International Development Cooperation Agency (Sweden), the Swiss Agency for Development and Cooperation (Switzerland), the World Bank and the United Nations Development Program (UNDP). The Commission's work was coordinated by a secretariat that was coordinated across Harvard University, the London School of Hygiene & Tropical Medicine and Tokyo University. However, the commission was criticised for its technocentric view and for its scarce integration of health research experiences in developing countries.
