= Alliance for Health Policy and Systems Research =

- Established: 1999
- Director: Dr Kumanan Rasanathan
- Address: avenue Appia 20, 1211 Geneva, Switzerland
- Nickname: The Alliance, AHPSR
- Affiliations: World Health Organization
- Website: ahpsr.who.int

The Alliance for Health Policy and Systems Research (the Alliance) is an international partnership hosted at World Health Organization Headquarters that works to improve the health of those in low and middle-income countries by supporting the generation and use of evidence that strengthens health systems.

== History ==
Following on from the recommendations of the 1996 WHO Ad Hoc Committee on Health Research, which recognised the role of research in strengthening health policies and the overall development of health systems, a group of global health leaders including senior scientists, policymakers, and representatives of various agencies and programs with a stake in health policy and systems research, met at Lejondal, Sweden. At that meeting, the experts agreed on the need to create a body that would address areas of health policy and systems research.

== Organization and governance ==
The Alliance has a small secretariat hosted at the World Health Organization Headquarters in Geneva, Switzerland. The Secretariat manages the day-to-day implementation of the Alliance work plan. The work of the Secretariat is overseen by both the Alliance Board, which is the governing body of the Alliance, and the Alliance Scientific and Technical Advisory Committee (STAC), which is responsible for providing scientific and technical advice to the Board and Secretariat.

For example, it is a core sponsor of the biennial Health Systems Research Symposium organized by Health Systems Global. It also has been involved in developing or commissioning a wide range of reports, guidelines, and journal articles that advance the field of health policy and systems research.
