= Global Forum for Health Research =

International medical and health organization based in Switzerland

The Global Forum for Health Research is an international foundation headquartered in Geneva, Switzerland, established in 1997 to increase the amount of research into global health issues. It coined the phrase 10/90 gap to identify the observation that only 10% of the world's health research spending is targeted at 90% of present health problems.

The Global Forum is a partner to the World Health Organization (WHO). In her keynote address to the Forum in 1999 Gro Harlem Brundtland, then Director–General of WHO, declared that the Global Forum was key in the involvement of all the various levels, sectors and disciplines of "development agencies, the research community, health workers and end–users".

The Global Forum represents all the parties interested in health research: governments, non-governmental organizations (NGOs), United Nations agencies, research centers, universities, and the pharmaceutical industry. It is run by a governing council and provides support to programmes of research that benefit the developing world. It draws attention to global health research aims with an annual forum that draws together international health researchers and policy makers.

The Global Forums take place in a different international location each year: Geneva, Bangkok, Arusha, Mexico City, Mumbai, Cairo. The 11th was in Beijing in 2007, the 12th in Bamako, Mali, in 2008 and Cuba hosted the 2009 Forum.

As a non-profit foundation the Global Forum is currently funded by the World Bank, the WHO; the governments of Brazil, Canada, Ireland, Mexico, Norway, Switzerland; and private philanthropy groups including the Rockefeller Foundation.

== See also ==
- Child Health and Nutrition Research Initiative
