= HPV vaccination in Japan =

HPV Vaccination program in Japan

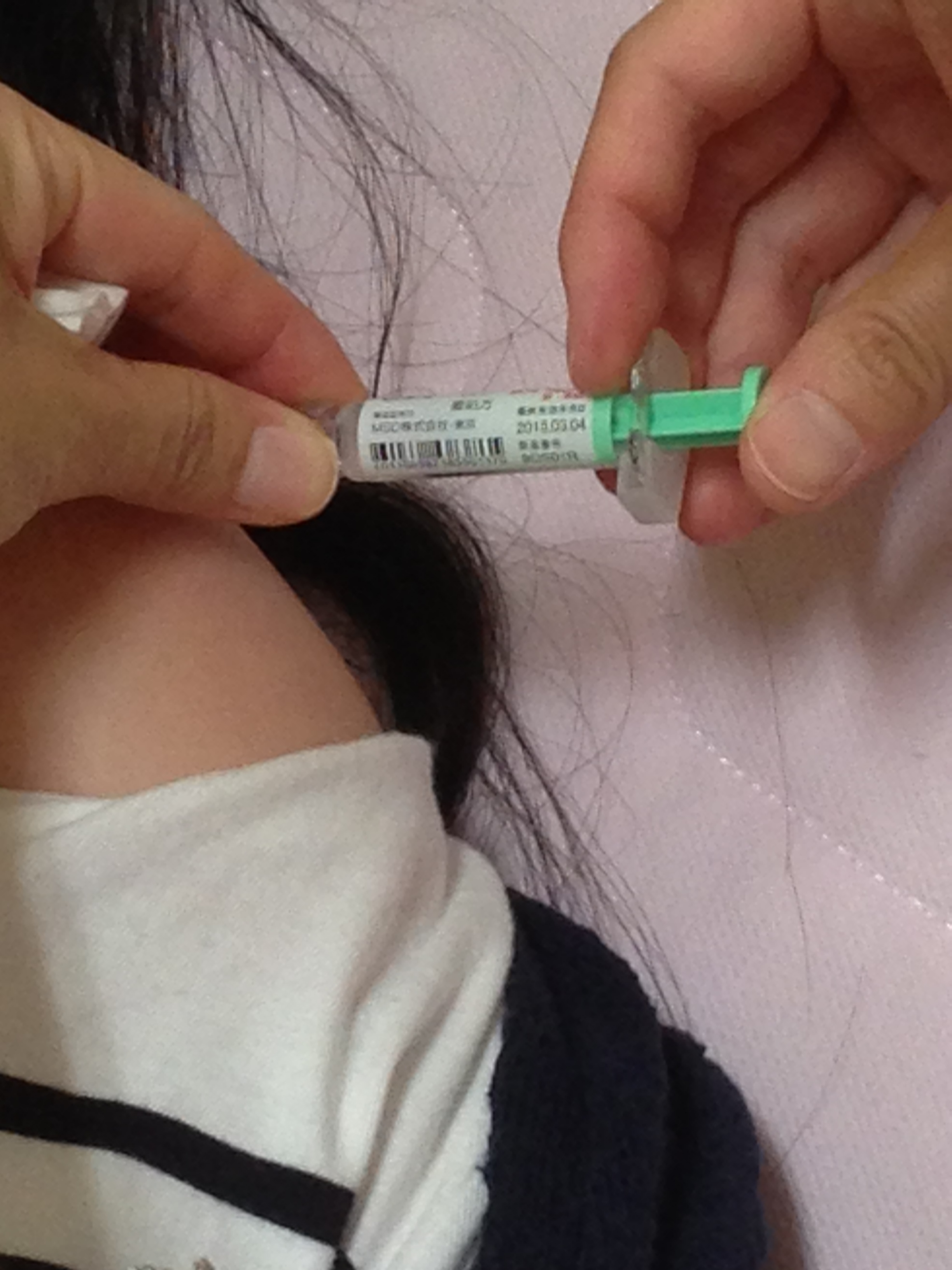
- HPV vaccination with Gardasil in Japan, 2016
- Specialty: Preventive medicine, public health
- Uses: Prevention of cervical cancer and other HPV-related cancers
- Approach: Routine and catch-up vaccination
- Frequency: 2 or 3 doses, depending on age at first dose

HPV vaccine coverage change over time (last dose)

HPV vaccine coverage among 12-year-old girls in Japan, 2024

HPV vaccination in Japan refers to the routine immunization programme, mandated under national law but funded and administered by municipal governments, to prevent cervical cancer and other HPV-related diseases. The programme has been marked by the introduction of routine immunization in 2013, an eight-year suspension of proactive recommendations (2013–2021) amid safety concerns, and subsequent recovery. It is routinely offered to girls from the equivalent of sixth grade of elementary school through the first year of high school, with vaccination provided free of charge under the national immunization programme through municipalities. Those who begin vaccination before age 15 generally receive two doses, while those who begin at age 15 or older receive three doses. Since April 2026, the 9-valent vaccine Gardasil 9 has been the only HPV vaccine used in the routine programme in Japan.

The suspension contributed to a sharp decline in vaccination and drew international attention, as Japan became the only high-income country to halt routine vaccine recommendations for an extended period. The resulting reduction is projected to lead to thousands of additional cervical cancer cases and deaths if vaccination coverage does not recover to pre-suspension levels.

A large-scale epidemiological study in Nagoya, Japan, found no significant association between HPV vaccination and 24 reported post-vaccination symptoms. International health organizations, including the World Health Organization, affirmed the vaccine's safety profile and called for Japan to resume proactive recommendations. Cervical cancer remained a major public health issue in Japan, where new cases and mortality had remained largely unchanged for decades, unlike declines seen in many other developed countries.

Following the resumption of proactive government recommendations in April 2022, vaccination coverage has gradually recovered through both routine immunization and catch-up vaccination for those who missed vaccination during the suspension. As of 2024, first-dose coverage exceeded 70% in some prefectures, although substantial regional disparities remain.

== Background ==
Cervical cancer is one of the most common cancers affecting young women in Japan. Each year, more than 10,000 women are diagnosed with cervical cancer, and approximately 3,000 die from the disease. In addition, about 1,000 women under the age of 40 lose their fertility each year due to cervical cancer treatment. In 2021, there were 10,690 diagnosed cases of cervical cancer in Japan, and in 2024, the number of deaths from the disease was 2,751.

These figures have remained largely unchanged for the past 30 years, in contrast to declining trends observed in other developed countries such as the United States, the United Kingdom, European nations, and Australia. One of the main contributing factors is the low uptake of cervical cancer screening by cytology and the absence of an organized screening system. Many women undergo irregular, ad hoc screenings, and the self-reported screening rate within two years among women aged 20 to 65 is approximately 40%. Under these circumstances, widespread use of the HPV vaccine is expected to play a major role in reducing the burden of cervical cancer in Japan.

Some researchers argue that Japan’s vaccine environment has a distinctive pattern. According to Andrew Gordon and Michael R. Reich, Japan is not historically a “vaccine‑hesitant country,” and routine childhood vaccines are widely accepted. However, repeated social movements over alleged vaccine injuries made both the government and the public more cautious toward newly introduced vaccines. Gordon and Reich referred to this dynamic as a “puzzle of vaccine hesitancy.”

== Vaccination programme ==
HPV vaccination in Japan targets girls in the sixth grade of elementary school through the first year of high school (approximately ages 12–16). Depending on the age at which vaccination begins, two or three doses are administered at specified intervals, and completing the required doses within one year is recommended. As of 2026, the only vaccine used in the routine, publicly funded programme is the 9-valent Gardasil 9 (シルガード9), which protects against seven high-risk HPV types (16, 18, 31, 33, 45, 52, and 58), preventing an estimated 80–90% of cervical cancers caused by HPV. The bivalent (Cervarix) and quadrivalent (Gardasil) vaccines were also part of the routine programme through fiscal year 2025.

Vaccination is provided free of charge to eligible individuals through designated municipal medical institutions during the routine eligibility period.

HPV vaccination in males can help prevent HPV-related diseases, including anal cancer, penile cancer, oropharyngeal cancer, and genital warts, and may also reduce HPV transmission. In Japan, male vaccination is approved but is not included in the routine immunization programme. Cost-effectiveness evaluation and the expansion of public vaccination coverage remain policy considerations.

International and domestic epidemiological research has found that countries with early national HPV vaccination programs, including Australia, the United Kingdom, and the United States, have seen significant reductions in HPV infection and precancerous lesions, including herd immunity effects among unvaccinated individuals of the same generation. Since 2020, Sweden, England, and Denmark have each published real-world evidence of reduced invasive cervical cancer among vaccinated cohorts. Domestic Japanese studies, including research conducted in Niigata, Akita, Miyagi, and Matsuyama, have similarly found reduced rates of HPV infection and precancerous lesions among vaccinated individuals compared with unvaccinated individuals of the same age.

=== Legal framework ===
Japan's immunization system is implemented under the Immunization Act, enacted in 1948. At the time of its enactment, routine vaccination programs were classified as delegated state administrative functions. Following the implementation of the Omnibus Decentralization Law in April 2000, they became autonomous functions of local governments.

Under Article 5 of Japan's Immunization Act, the responsibility for implementing routine vaccinations lies with local governments, such as cities, towns, and villages. For diseases classified as Category A under the Immunization Act (Japan), municipalities are legally obligated to promote vaccination among eligible individuals and their guardians. "Proactive recommendation" refers to targeted outreach efforts such as sending postcards or screening forms directly to households prior to the standard vaccination period, encouraging timely uptake of the vaccine.

The Vaccination and Vaccine Subcommittee is an advisory body that makes recommendations to the Minister of Health, Labour and Welfare; formal policy decisions are made and implemented by the Ministry.

Although municipalities are responsible for implementing routine vaccinations and covering the associated costs, 90 percent of these costs is financed through local allocation tax grants from the national government.

=== Procurement and distribution of vaccines ===
In low-income countries, vaccines are procured at low prices with the support of the GAVI Alliance, a global partnership organization launched at the Annual Meeting of the World Economic Forum (Davos) in 2000. Japan is one of the donor countries. A 2018 study on HPV vaccine pricing in European tender-based settings concluded that, since HPV vaccines are widely procured across Europe, the average tender price decreased to one-quarter of the list price. The study suggested that tendering is an effective cost-containment strategy and may expand cost-effective HPV vaccination to previously excluded target groups. A 2024 study found that the lowest price was the predominant criterion in national tenders for HPV vaccine suppliers in EU member states, indicating that competitive tendering was used to obtain vaccines at the lowest available price.

On the other hand, in Japan, because responsibility for routine immunization rests with local governments, vaccines are purchased by individual medical institutions through wholesalers from vaccine manufacturers. The national government does not engage in price negotiations with manufacturers, and vaccine procurement is carried out by medical institutions or, in some cases, by municipalities. As a result, “for vaccines designated as routine immunizations, municipalities must purchase them at any price, creating a price formation mechanism favorable to sellers.”

=== Vaccine side effect reports ===
Japan's adverse-reaction reporting system operates through multiple channels: physicians are required under Article 12 of the Immunization Act to report suspected reactions upon becoming aware of them; vaccine manufacturers separately report cases under the Pharmaceuticals and Medical Devices Act; and vaccine recipients or their guardians may also report suspected harm directly to their municipality. According to the Pharmaceuticals and Medical Devices Agency (PMDA), a report may be accepted "even where a causal relationship between the reported symptom and vaccination is not necessarily clear," if reporting is judged necessary from the standpoint of preventing harm to public health. Common side effects include pain, swelling, and redness at the injection site. Rare adverse reactions, occurring at an undetermined frequency, include anaphylaxis, Guillain–Barré syndrome, acute disseminated encephalomyelitis (ADEM), and immune thrombocytopenia. Vaccination is contraindicated for individuals with known hypersensitivity to vaccine components, and requires medical consultation for those with certain underlying conditions, prior severe allergic reactions to vaccination, seizure history, immunodeficiency, or pregnancy. For vaccinations falling outside the routine immunization schedule, it is possible to receive Silgard 9 at one's own expense. However, unlike routine vaccinations, the relief system applicable in the event of a health impairment is not the "Relief System for Health Damage Associated with Vaccination" based on the Preventive Vaccination Law, but rather the "Relief System for Adverse Drug Reactions" based on the Pharmaceuticals and Medical Devices Agency (PMDA) Law.

For routine vaccination under the Immunization Act, Japan's vaccine injury compensation system provides benefits to people who suffer health problems following vaccination. Applications are reviewed individually by the Health Damage Review Committee, which considers the medical plausibility of the symptoms, their temporal relationship to vaccination, and whether another cause is reasonably more likely. The Ministry of Health, Labour and Welfare states that strict medical proof of causation is not required for compensation; cases may be eligible when a causal relationship with vaccination cannot be ruled out.

== Current status ==
In Japan, HPV vaccination data has traditionally been reported as an "implementation rate" (実施率) based on vaccinations administered to girls within the standard vaccination age range. Because catch-up vaccinations may be included in the annual totals, the reported implementation rate can exceed 100%. Vaccination coverage estimates by birth cohort were introduced later and are also used in epidemiological analyses. (Note: The “number of recipients” for routine vaccinations refers to the number of girls who received the vaccination between the first day of the fiscal year in which they turn 12 and the last day of the fiscal year in which they turn 16. The “vaccination coverage rate” is calculated by dividing the “number of recipients” by the target population (the total population within the standard vaccination age range). Note that the standard vaccination period is defined as the period from the first day of the fiscal year in which a person turns 13 to the last day of that fiscal year. Furthermore, the national annual coverage rate for fiscal year 2021 is calculated by dividing the number of recipients (taken from the “Number of Recipients of Routine Vaccinations” in the Regional Health and Health Promotion Project Report) by the target population (calculated by taking the total population during the standard vaccination age period from the Statistics Bureau of the Ministry of Internal Affairs and Communications’ estimated population [as of October 1, 2021] and extrapolating it to a 12-month equivalent population). Since the target population consists of those who became eligible for vaccination for the first time in each fiscal year, while the vaccinated population consists of those who received vaccinations out of the total eligible population for that fiscal year, the implementation rate may exceed 100%. In addition to the implementation rate, there is an indicator for the estimated vaccination rate by birth year.) (Note: In the Ministry of Health, Labour and Welfare’s tally of the number of people receiving routine vaccinations, annual statistics and annual surveys are mixed, and since the timing of surveys varies by municipality, it is difficult to determine the exact number of HPV vaccine recipients. For this reason, Nakagawa et al. of Osaka University have calculated estimated values by applying statistical adjustments to the vaccination rates by birth year in “Corrected human papillomavirus vaccination rates for each birth fiscal year in Japan” (2020 Jun;111(6):2156-2162. doi: 10.1111/cas.14406. Epub 2020 Apr 27.). Although vaccination results by age group are published in Table 66 of Chapter 3 (Municipalities) of the Regional Health and Health Promotion Projects Report (Regional Health Edition) by the Ministry of Health, Labour and Welfare, the number of eligible individuals by age group is not specified; therefore, routine vaccination rates have not been calculated. The estimated values were revealed at the 100th meeting of the Adverse Reaction Review Subcommittee of the Vaccination and Vaccine Subcommittee of the Council for Health Science held on January 26, 2024, the 15th Meeting of the Safety Measures Investigation Committee of the Pharmaceutical Safety Measures Subcommittee of the Pharmaceutical and Food Safety Council for FY2023 (held jointly) on January 26, 2024.)

HPV vaccination in Japan initially achieved high uptake, with over 70% coverage among eligible girls in some regions. In recent years, following the resumption of proactive recommendation in 2022, catch-up programs and advocacy efforts have gradually increased awareness and access, though disparities persist. The following section presents historical vaccination numbers and cohort-specific coverage. The schedule was revised in April 2023, coinciding with the introduction of the 9-valent HPV vaccine, reducing the routine vaccination from three doses to two doses for those under 15 years of age.

=== By birth cohort ===
225,993 girls were vaccinated in the first round of routine vaccination in 2022, and the vaccination rate was 42.2%. The Osaka University Graduate School of Medicine and Faculty of Medicine reported the first vaccination rate and cumulative first vaccination rate for each year of birth in 2022 at a meeting of the Ministry of Health, Labor and Welfare. The cumulative first-dose vaccination rate by birth year through the end of fiscal year 2025 is shown in the graph below.

Human papillomavirus vaccination by birth fiscal year in Japan

==== First-time recipients in Japan ====
After the resumption of recommendations in November 2021, the first half of fiscal year 2022 saw approximately 160,000 individuals complete their first dose of routine vaccination, resulting in a coverage rate of 30.1%. Including catch-up vaccinations, the total number of first-dose recipients reached 540,681 in fiscal year 2022, 659,175 in fiscal year 2023, and 1,534,304 in fiscal year 2024 (revised from a preliminary figure of 1,513,862). The catch-up program formally concluded at the end of fiscal year 2025, and first-dose recipients fell sharply that year to 293,635 (291,037 routine and 2,598 catch-up).

Annual number of first-time HPV vaccine recipients in Japan (routine and catch-up)

=== Regional disparities ===
In 2025, Oka and colleagues published a population-based cross-sectional study analyzing HPV vaccination uptake in Osaka City, Japan. The study examined cumulative vaccination coverage among 185,373 girls born between fiscal years 1997 and 2010, using neighborhood-level socioeconomic indicators and access metrics. As of 2022, 18,688 girls in Osaka City had received at least one dose of the HPV vaccine. Uptake was higher in areas with lower deprivation and greater access to vaccination facilities. The authors found significant associations between vaccination rates and both the Area Deprivation Index (ADI) and proximity to medical providers, suggesting that socioeconomic and geographic factors influenced recovery in coverage following the resumption of proactive recommendation.

According to estimates reported by m3.com and Vaccine JAPAN, Japan's HPV vaccination uptake — measured as cumulative lifetime doses received among girls in the routine cohort — shows substantial regional variation. Among girls who have ever received a first dose, Yamagata Prefecture recorded the highest cumulative first-dose uptake rate at around 67%, while Okinawa Prefecture was the lowest at about 17%. Nationwide, the cumulative lifetime first-dose rate for girls born in 2007 exceeded 70% by FY2023. These figures highlight both the recovery of cumulative uptake after the suspension period and the marked differences in lifetime vaccination rates among prefectures.

==== By prefecture in 2024 ====
In fiscal year 2024, annual (non-cumulative) routine HPV vaccination rates were highest in Miyazaki Prefecture at 20.8%, followed by Yamagata Prefecture at 19.8%, while Okinawa Prefecture had the lowest rate at 7.4%.

The HPV vaccination rate for 16-year-olds, specifically the cumulative first-dose vaccination rate showing the proportion of people who received at least one dose, was reported in October 2025 as follows: Yamagata Prefecture had the highest rate at 82.1%, followed by Akita Prefecture (72.7%), with Okinawa Prefecture at the bottom (24.4%). Yamagata Prefecture's high vaccination rate is attributed to the success of awareness campaigns, primarily led by the Prefectural Obstetricians and Gynecologists Association, as well as activities such as placing posters in stores and other locations.

Okinawa Prefecture has recognized low HPV vaccination coverage as a public health challenge. According to an Okinawa Prefectural Assembly statement, the prefecture's routine HPV vaccination coverage was 4.1% in fiscal year 2022, 5.3% in fiscal year 2023, and 7.4% in fiscal year 2024. Catch-up vaccination coverage was 2.1%, 2.4%, and 8.8%, respectively. The prefecture reported that both routine and catch-up vaccination coverage remained the lowest among Japanese prefectures and identified improving vaccination uptake as an important policy issue. Local medical organizations have also expressed concern regarding low vaccination coverage in Okinawa. The Okinawa Prefecture Medical Association and regional medical groups have promoted measures to increase vaccination opportunities, including public information campaigns and group vaccination programs.

==== Professional society recommendations ====
On 7 August 2026, the Japan Society of Obstetrics and Gynecology (JSOG) issued a statement urging healthcare professionals across all specialties to actively support HPV vaccination. Citing the WHO's goal of achieving 90% HPV vaccination coverage among girls by age 15 by 2030, the society noted that uptake in Japan had recovered only to around 50% following the resumption of proactive recommendations in 2022. It emphasized that cervical cancer remains a preventable disease and encouraged physicians to discuss HPV vaccination with eligible patients and their families and to strengthen vaccination services in clinical practice.

== International context ==
Coverage of the human papillomavirus vaccine

HPV vaccines were first introduced in WHO member states in 2006. As of 2024, most high-income countries maintain routine HPV vaccination programs. Australia reports vaccination coverage exceeding 80% through school-based delivery, while the United Kingdom has consistently achieved coverage above 70% through its national programme. According to the ECDC, Iceland, Portugal, and Norway reached the 2024 target of 90% HPV vaccination coverage among girls by age 15, and declining cervical cancer incidence has been reported among vaccinated cohorts across Europe.

In contrast, Japan's HPV vaccine coverage remained below 1% for several years following the suspension of proactive recommendation in 2013. According to WHO estimates, 36% of females had received their first dose of the HPV vaccine by age 15 as of 2024.

== History of vaccination policy ==
Following the introduction of HPV vaccination into the routine immunization programme in April 2013, reports emerged of persistent pain affecting areas of the body beyond the injection site. At a meeting of experts on June 14, 2013, the reported adverse events were assessed based on the medical information available at the time. The experts concluded that the risks did not warrant discontinuing routine HPV vaccination when considered in relation to its benefits. However, because sufficient information could not yet be provided about cases of persistent pain affecting areas beyond the injection site and other reported adverse events, the meeting recommended temporarily withholding proactive recommendations while continuing to ensure that people who wished to be vaccinated could receive the vaccine.

=== Early development and implementation ===
In December 2008, 36 members of Japan's National Diet from the ruling coalition (the Liberal Democratic Party and Komeito) established the parliamentary league "Lawmakers' Association for Promoting Public Health through Vaccination", commonly known as the Vaccine Promotion Parliamentary League. Anticipating the imminent approval of the HPV vaccine, the league began by discussing cervical cancer prevention and measures to promote HPV vaccination, including possible public financial support and health insurance coverage. Cervarix (GlaxoSmithKline) was approved in October 2009 and released in December. In November 2010, the “Emergency Program to Promote Vaccination Against Cervical Cancer and Other Diseases” was launched, and the HPV vaccine became publicly subsidized.

Gardasil (Merck & Co.) was approved in July 2011 and released in August. Routine vaccination for girls in Grade 6 through Grade 10 was incorporated into the Immunization Act on April 1, 2013, under the name "cervical cancer vaccine (子宮頸がんワクチン)". Proactive recommendations were suspended just two months later, in June 2013, leading to a sharp and prolonged decline in coverage

==== Political and social factors ====
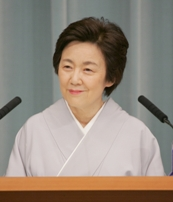
Eriko Yamatani at a press conference upon her appointment as a Special Advisor to the Prime Minister

In a 2013 session of the National Diet, Upper House member Michiko Ueno (上野通子) expressed concern regarding HPV vaccine promotion, stating that the government may not have given sufficient consideration to sexual education in relation to administering the vaccine to girls in their early teens. Fellow councillor Eriko Yamatani (山谷えり子) also opposed public vaccination, arguing that it "presupposes sexual experience in early adolescence," and claimed that regular medical checkups alone could prevent nearly 100% of cervical cancer deaths.

In street demonstrations organized by the Unification Church, banners reading "Sexual ethics education over HPV vaccine subsidies" were displayed, and participants chanted slogans opposing public funding for the vaccine. At the time, a misconception that cervical cancer resulted from sexual promiscuity was prevalent in some circles. Given the church's emphasis on educational purity as a doctrinal priority, HPV vaccination was seen as incompatible with its moral teachings.

==== Initial suspension and response ====
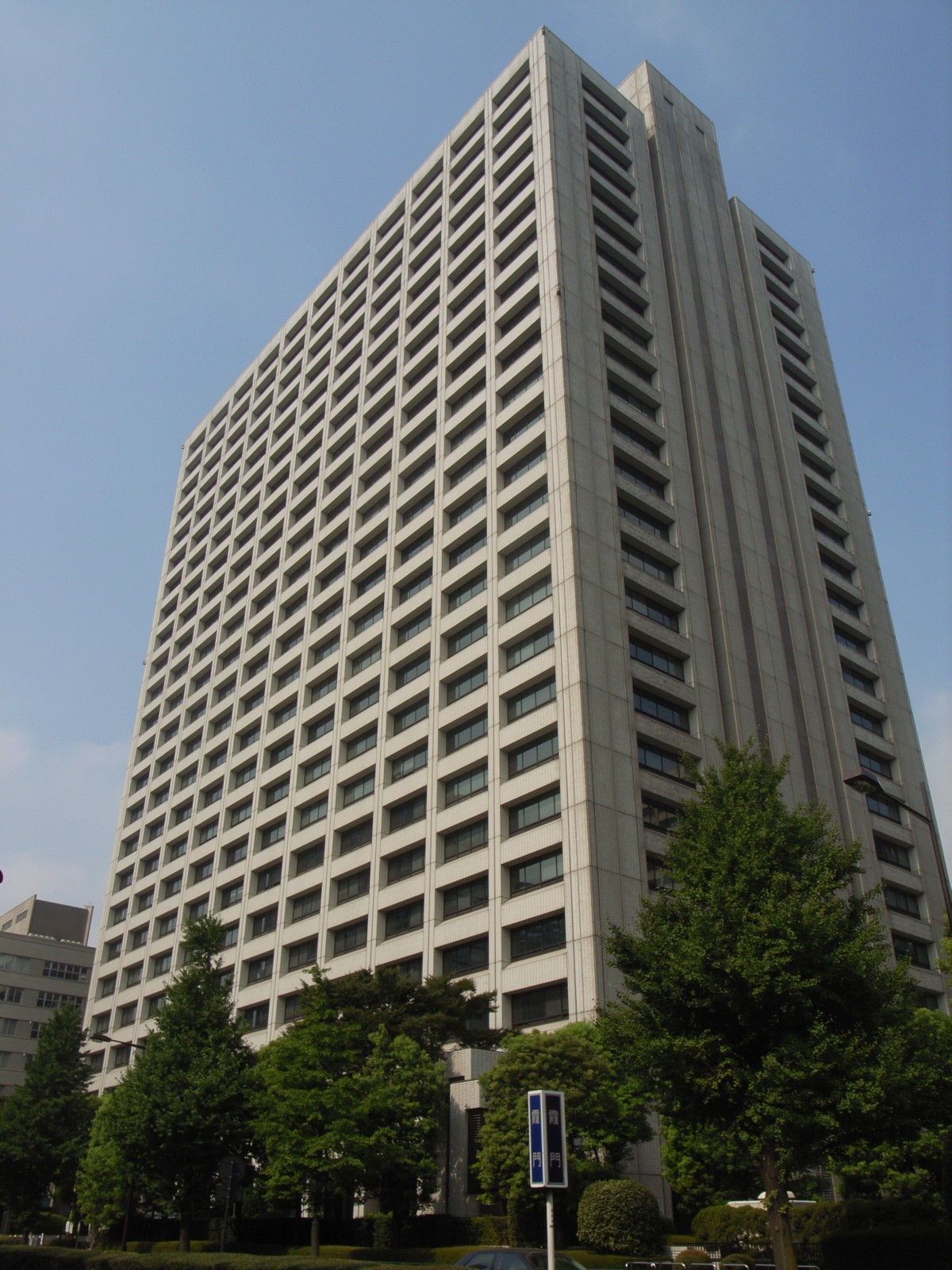
Ministry of Health, Labour and Welfare Government Office Complex No. 5

In March 2013, parents of girls who reported serious symptoms following HPV vaccination established the National Liaison Association of Cervical Cancer Vaccine Victims and called for the suspension of HPV vaccination. The association subsequently called for the vaccination programme itself to be suspended, including in a meeting with the health minister in August 2013. In June 2013, Japan's Ministry of Health, Labour and Welfare suspended its recommendation for the HPV vaccine following media reports of alleged side effects. The claimed side effects included chronic pain, although routine vaccination itself remained available. In Tokyo's Suginami Ward, a junior high school student reported difficulty walking for over a year following vaccination. The ward initially declined compensation but reversed its decision after public criticism. As of the end of April 2016, the Ministry of Health, Labour and Welfare reported that approximately 3.39 million people had been vaccinated and 2,945 had reported health problems following vaccination.

In the United Kingdom, the United States, Ireland, and Colombia, citizen groups have emerged in response to concerns about adverse events following HPV vaccination. In March 2018, an international symposium on HPV vaccine adverse events was held in Tokyo, with representatives of advocacy groups from Spain, the United Kingdom, Ireland, and Colombia participating alongside Japanese plaintiffs' groups. The United Kingdom, Colombia, and Spain issued a joint declaration calling for the suspension of proactive HPV vaccine recommendations. The statement urged governments to halt promotion until long-term health monitoring systems were established and independent safety evaluations could be conducted. In Ireland, cervical cancer patient and advocate Laura Brennan publicly promoted HPV vaccination during efforts to restore confidence in the vaccine following a decline in uptake. Her advocacy received widespread media attention and formed part of broader public health communication campaigns associated with subsequent recovery in vaccination coverage.

In Japan, suspending proactive vaccine recommendations has been a recurring public health strategy in response to safety concerns. This approach was previously applied to other vaccines, including the measles-mumps-rubella (MMR vaccine) in the early 1990s and the Japanese encephalitis vaccine between 2005 and 2010, following reports of adverse events. These suspensions typically involved halting individualized outreach, such as sending vaccination vouchers or reminders, while continuing to offer the vaccine upon request. Although the suspension of proactive HPV vaccine recommendations from 2013 to 2021 followed this established pattern, it was longer than in previous cases and was associated with markedly reduced vaccination coverage and projected shortfalls relative to World Health Organization targets. In interviews published in 2019 and 2026, former MHLW official Tokumasa Shoubayashi (正林督章) stated that the prolonged suspension was primarily driven by media coverage rather than scientific evidence alone. He recalled that officials had initially expected proactive recommendation to resume within about six months while additional safety data were gathered, but that the first meeting of the Adverse Reactions Review Committee was disrupted by heckling from the public gallery, preventing it from reaching a conclusion, and that even academic societies opposed the vaccine at the time. He also stated that several MHLW medical officers assigned to the issue suffered mental health breakdowns after being subjected to hostile telephone calls from opponents of the vaccine. He attributed the decline in public trust to Japan's prevailing "zero-risk" mindset, said that public opinion failed to shift despite accumulating evidence supporting the vaccine's safety and effectiveness, and suggested that without a change in public opinion, resuming proactive recommendation would be difficult to justify.

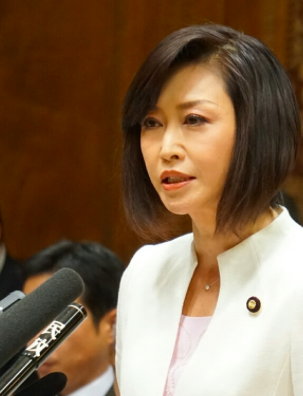
Junko Mihara speaking in the National Diet.

Junko Mihara (三原じゅん子), a member of the House of Councillors and a cervical cancer survivor, advocated for the resumption of proactive HPV vaccination. Drawing on her personal experience, she called for stronger government support and, in parliamentary questioning, raised concerns about delays in resuming recommendations and approving the nine-valent vaccine, asking why it had not been resumed and “what factors were influencing the delay.” She also argued that the term “HPV vaccine” should be used instead of “cervical cancer vaccine” to reflect its broader protective effects, including for males. At a January 2020 study session organized by the "Society for Considering the Future of Japanese Medicine," Fumimaro Takaku (髙久史麿), chairman of the Community Health Care Organization and former president of the Japan Medical Association, warned that if proactive HPV vaccination recommendations continued to be withheld, Japan would within a decade become the only developed country with a high rate of cervical cancer. He attributed primary responsibility to the Ministry of Health, Labour and Welfare, noting that when he had personally visited the ministry to raise concerns, the official response was that they would wait for the results of a nationwide survey before making any decision — a reply he described as evasive. Kunio Kitamura (北村邦夫), chairman of the Japan Family Planning Association, expressed puzzlement that meaningful progress remained elusive even with a parliamentary league of influential lawmakers behind the initiative, questioning whether the greater fault lay in acting and failing, or in failing to act at all.

=== Ministry directive restricting individual notification (2013–2020) ===
On June 14, 2013, concurrent with the suspension of proactive recommendation, the MHLW issued a directive to prefectural governors pursuant to Article 245-4, Paragraph 1 of the Local Autonomy Act, stating that municipal notifications to eligible persons "should not include individual notification." This restriction remained in effect until October 9, 2020, following the transition from the Shinzo Abe administration to the Yoshihide Suga administration on September 16, 2020. The MHLW revised the 2013 notice by deleting this provision and instead encouraging municipalities to send individual notifications to eligible persons, communicating the revision to prefectural governors with instructions to inform municipalities and related organizations. On the same day, the MHLW also requested cooperation from the Japan Medical Association in disseminating updated informational materials on HPV vaccination, which was subsequently forwarded to member organizations.

==== Municipal implementation surveys ====
In a 2018 survey of local governments, the Ministry of Health, Labour and Welfare asked about the use of HPV vaccine leaflets. The results showed that of the 1,741 municipalities surveyed, 70.9% (1,235 municipalities) had neither posted the leaflets online nor distributed them in person. Further, only 79 municipalities were sending or distributing leaflets or their own informational materials directly to eligible individuals. In a survey of citizens, some respondents expressed concern about the phrasing “We are temporarily suspending our active recommendation of the HPV vaccine” and noted that the information provided seemed to focus heavily on side effects.

The MHLW conducted surveys to monitor municipal implementation of information provision policies. A March 2021 survey of 1,714 municipalities (with a 99% response rate) found that 1,056 municipalities (61.6%) had sent individual notifications with leaflets during fiscal year 2020, while 658 municipalities (38.4%) had not. A May 2024 survey of 1,741 municipalities found that by December 2023, 92.2% had completed individual notification distribution for routine vaccination, while 67.4% had completed distribution for catch-up vaccination. Among municipalities that did not send notifications, one reason recorded in the survey was "considering past adverse reactions, we are proceeding cautiously with recommendations."

==== Responses by local governments ====
During the suspension of proactive HPV vaccine recommendation, some local governments reportedly responded in ways that discouraged potential recipients. For example, individuals were told that "vaccination is not recommended," that "there are side effects," and even asked whether a pre-vaccination screening form was truly necessary given that "not even 0.01% of people choose to get vaccinated." Such remarks caused hesitation among those who wished to receive the vaccine. Other accounts include being warned strongly about adverse reactions—prompting questions like "Are you really going to get it?"—in a manner perceived as obstructive. In one case, a recipient requested that a pre-vaccination screening form be sent to a friend's address in time for the vaccination deadline, but it was delivered too late. These experiences were reported to physicians by affected individuals.

As HPV vaccination rates fell sharply, Okayama Governor Ryuta Ibaragi (伊原木隆太) launched an independent public awareness campaign. He issued a leaflet under his own name promoting HPV vaccination. Motivated by concerns about cervical cancer deaths among women in their 30s and 40s, he continued these efforts despite receiving little support from other governors or municipalities. He remarked that, regardless of how strongly the WHO Director-General promoted HPV vaccination, municipalities followed the guidance of Japan's Ministry of Health, Labour and Welfare rather than that of the WHO. Tomonori Kiyoyama 清山知憲, the mayor of Miyazaki City and a medical doctor, promoted the HPV vaccine based on the principles of evidence-based policy making (EBPM). He conducted public awareness activities through various events and succeeded in increasing vaccination rates. He also introduced financial support for male HPV vaccination, a measure that had not yet been initiated at the national level.

==== Media amplification and public anxiety ====
A physician-led study of Japan’s five largest newspapers concluded that media coverage of HPV vaccination became increasingly negative after Asahi Shimbun's widely publicized report on the Suginami Ward case described above, which described a student alleging adverse symptoms following vaccination. The study further suggested that the Japanese government’s reluctance to issue explicit safety assurances—partly influenced by past vaccine-related lawsuits such as those involving the MMR vaccine—contributed to prolonged negative reporting and the continued suspension of proactive HPV vaccine recommendations. The HPV vaccine debate occurred during a broader period of opposition to comprehensive sex education in Japan, which some researchers have characterized as "sex education backlash" (性教育バッシング).According to Obstetrician-gynecologist Song Mi-hyun (宋美玄), this climate subjected medical professionals and journalists who supported HPV vaccination to public criticism and organizational pressure. Journalist Naoko Iwanaga (岩永直子), then editor-in-chief of yomiDr., a medical website operated by the Yomiuri Shimbun, published a feature on HPV vaccine safety and efficacy in 2017. After the article drew numerous complaints, she was removed as editor-in-chief and transferred to a regional bureau, where she could no longer write medical articles and subsequently left the newspaper. She continued reporting on HPV vaccination and received the 2020 Internet Media Award. The Nagoya Study, discussed in detail below, was conducted at the mayor's direction in response to citizens alleging vaccine injury; however, because it found no differences between vaccinated and unvaccinated individuals, the results were removed from the city's website three days after publication.

=== Sex education context and gender framing ===
As of 2026, Japan’s Ministry of Education curriculum guidelines continue to maintain provisions that prohibit teaching about sexual intercourse and contraception in schools.

In the 2025 Global Gender Gap Report published by the World Economic Forum, Japan ranked 118th out of 148 countries, placing last among G7 nations. The report highlighted significant gaps in political and economic participation, with projections indicating it may take over a century to achieve gender parity at the current pace. (Note: In Japan, women were systematically discriminated against in medical school entrance exams. Investigations revealed that several universities had deliberately lowered scores for female applicants to reduce the number of women admitted. This practice came to light in 2018 and sparked widespread public criticism, leading to government inquiries and institutional reforms.)

In Japan, the HPV vaccine was commonly referred to as the "cervical cancer vaccine". Hanako Jimi (自見英子), a pediatrician and member of the House of Councillors, criticized the prolonged suspension of proactive HPV vaccine recommendations. In a 2021 interview, she stated: "If this were a prostate cancer prevention vaccine, even with some hesitation, it would likely have been reinstated within a year." Kanako Inaba (稲葉加奈子), an obstetrician-gynecologist and representative of the advocacy group "Minpapi!"(“Let’s Learn About HPV Together” Project), expressed similar concerns. At a press conference following the submission of a citizen petition, she remarked: "Over the past eight years, sufficient evidence has accumulated regarding the vaccine's efficacy and safety. There is no longer any reason for the government to delay. If this were a disease causing penile loss in men in their 20s to 40s, would the government have left it unaddressed for so long?"

== Controversy over safety ==
The large-scale introduction of HPV vaccination in Japan, where intramuscular vaccination was relatively uncommon, was followed by reports of adverse events and a domestic controversy over vaccine safety. The government's subsequent suspension of proactive recommendations drew criticism from international health organizations, including the WHO Global Advisory Committee on Vaccine Safety (GACVS).

=== Background to the adverse reaction controversy and subsequent research ===
Some clinicians and professional organizations noted early in the controversy that HPV vaccination differed from most routinely administered vaccines in Japan because it was given intramuscularly. In Japan, routine vaccination had historically relied heavily on subcutaneous injection, partly because intramuscular injections had long been avoided following quadriceps contracture cases associated with intramuscular administration of certain drugs in the 1970s. In June 2026, the Public Health Committee of the Japan Pediatric Association released an educational video to promote the understanding and practice of intramuscular vaccination among healthcare professionals.

On September 12, 2013, the Japan Society of Obstetrics and Gynecology, the Japan Association of Obstetricians and Gynecologists, and the Japan Society of Gynecologic Oncology jointly submitted a petition to Norihisa Tamura, Minister of Health, Labour and Welfare, requesting the resumption of deliberations on the reinstatement of recommendations for cervical cancer vaccination, and calling for the early resumption of deliberations on active recommendations.

At “The Public Hearing on Adverse Events following HPV Vaccination in Japan,” held on February 26, 2014, Dr. Sin Hang Lee and others expressed concerns regarding the vaccine’s adjuvant.

In March 2016, a research team led by Dr. Shuichi Ikeda (池田修一) reported that 80% of patients with neurological symptoms shared the HLA-DPB1*0501 gene type. Mouse experiments suggested autoantibody deposition in the hippocampus. According to the research team's presentation, experiments using NF-κB p50 knockout mice found that only the Cervarix-treated group showed IgG autoantibody deposition in the mouse hippocampus, binding of these antibodies to human hippocampal tissue, and peripheral neuropathy. The researchers stated that they planned to purify the antibodies to investigate the mechanism underlying the neurological disorder.

Dr. Shuichi Ikeda, who had received a research grant from Japan’s Ministry of Health to study potential adverse effects of the HPV vaccine, publicly suggested a causal relationship during a televised appearance on TBS's News 23 program on March 16, 2016. His remarks were widely reported in the press the following day, prompting heightened public concern. In June 2016, Shinshu University established an external investigation committee in response to a whistleblower report alleging research misconduct. In November, the committee concluded that "it cannot be denied that information suggesting the mouse experiment results were scientifically proven has spread throughout society." The experiment did not observe the condition of NFκ-βp50-deficient mice after HPV vaccination but instead extracted serum from vaccinated mice and applied it to brain tissue of naïve mice. The experiment used only one serum sample per group, and in subsequent replication attempts, no reaction was observed in any brain tissue samples. The committee requested that Professor Ikeda conduct a new experiment starting from the initial vaccination stage using scientifically validated knockout mice, and to publish the results. Additionally, concerns were raised about a designated professor (referred to as Professor B), who had collected serum from multiple mice but reported results based only on a single sample (n=1), calling into question the integrity of the research. The Shinshu University investigation committee concluded by stating that "a serious reflection is required for having caused public confusion." On November 24, 2016, the Ministry of Health, Labour and Welfare (MHLW) issued a statement saying, "Due to Professor Ikeda's inappropriate presentation, a situation has arisen that misled the public. We consider his social responsibility to be significant and deeply regret the matter." The ministry further stated, "The research results presented by the Ikeda team do not provide any evidence that the symptoms observed after HPV vaccination were caused by the vaccine itself." A subsequent Ministry of Health, Labour and Welfare statement on the matter noted that an evaluation committee had scored Ikeda's research group at 24 out of 40 points, and that the group's fiscal year 2017 grant was accordingly reduced from ¥4.5 million to ¥3.645 million.

In a separate line of research, a study published in Scientific Reports in 2016 suggested that combined administration of an HPV vaccine and pertussis toxin caused neurological damage in mice. The paper attracted media attention in Japan and was cited by vaccine-hesitant groups. However, the methodology was criticized as lacking reproducibility and having inadequate controls. In May 2018, Scientific Reports formally retracted the article, citing methodological flaws.

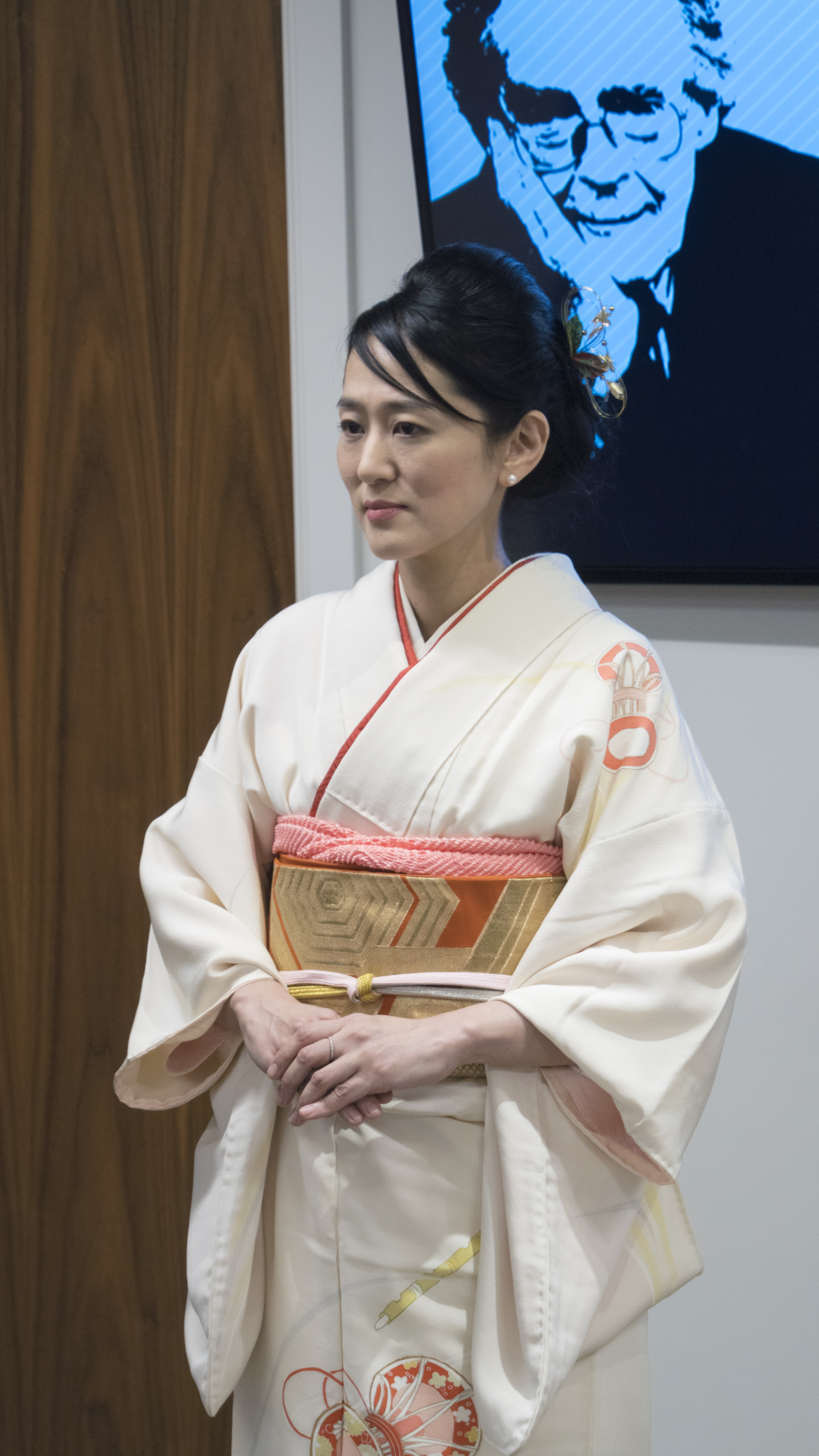
Muranaka at the 2017 John Maddox Prize delivery ceremony.

Dr. Ikeda filed a defamation lawsuit against journalist Riko Muranaka (村中璃子) and the magazine Wedge, alleging that her reporting on his research constituted libel. The court ruled in favor of Ikeda. Nobel laureate Tasuku Honjo (本庶佑) submitted an expert opinion criticizing the scientific basis of the study. He publicly addressed the HPV vaccine issue during a press conference in Stockholm, calling the situation in Japan "outrageous and serious." He also met with the Minister of Health to urge the resumption of proactive HPV vaccine recommendation. Honjo later stated that although he explained the issue to journalists, his comments were repeatedly rejected by editorial desks. Following the court ruling, Muranaka announced her intention to appeal, stating that she viewed the lawsuit not only as a legal challenge but also as an opportunity to advocate for scientific integrity and to build connections within the medical and journalistic communities Commenting on the case, Heidi Larson, director of the Vaccine Confidence Project at the London School of Hygiene & Tropical Medicine, emphasized that the outcome should not be interpreted as a validation of Dr. Ikeda's scientific claims. She noted that the ruling was based on issues of tone and expression, rather than scientific merit.

In 2017, Japanese physician and journalist Riko Muranaka was awarded the John Maddox Prize, jointly presented by Nature and the Sense about Science foundation. The award recognized her efforts to communicate scientific evidence about the safety of the HPV vaccine in Japan, despite facing public hostility, professional backlash, and legal threats. Muranaka's reporting challenged widespread misinformation and highlighted the consequences of Japan's prolonged suspension of proactive vaccine recommendations, including the projected rise in cervical cancer cases and deaths. The Supreme Court dismissed her claim on the grounds that it served no purpose, as the publisher had already paid the full amount of damages. International commentators noted that Japan's suspension had broader implications. Okita (2020) analyzed the suspension as a case study at the intersection of science, ethics, and policy, concluding that political decisions departed significantly from scientific consensus.

=== Evidence and expert responses ===
==== Scientific review: Nagoya City study ====
Following concerns over reported symptoms after HPV vaccination, the Nagoya City Council requested a government investigation in 2014. In 2015, after the Mayor of Nagoya approved a petition submitted by the Aichi branch of the Nationwide Cervical Cancer Vaccine Victims Liaison Association, Nagoya City and Nagoya City University initiated an epidemiological survey on HPV vaccine safety. The study, led by Professor Sadao Suzuki (鈴木貞夫) of Nagoya City University, targeted approximately 70,000 young women born between April 1994 and April 2001, comparing symptom prevalence between vaccinated and unvaccinated groups. A peer-reviewed study analyzing the survey data concluded that there was no statistically significant difference in the frequency of reported symptoms—such as chronic pain, motor dysfunction, or memory impairment—between the vaccinated and unvaccinated cohorts. Nagoya City released a preliminary report in December 2015 stating that no difference in symptoms was observed between vaccinated and unvaccinated individuals. However, in the final report published on the city’s website, odds ratios were removed. In subsequent litigation, the city stated that it considered the use of the survey as evidence for a causal relationship by pharmaceutical companies to be inconsistent with political neutrality.

In 2018, Professor Sadao Suzuki of Nagoya City University published a peer-reviewed study concluding no statistical association between HPV vaccination and 24 reported symptoms among young women. The study was subsequently reanalyzed by Yaju and Tsubaki, who found that the results varied depending on the adjustment method. In the study period-adjusted multivariate analyses, the vaccinated cases were significantly more likely than the unvaccinated controls to have experienced symptoms of memory impairment and involuntary movement. One of the authors, Yukari Yaju, was a member of Medwatcher Japan (薬害オンブズパースン会議) at the time. Suzuki responded that no formal rebuttal had been submitted to the journal and defended the study's scientific validity. In 2022, he publicly called for the retraction of a critical nursing science article, citing concerns over its influence on public understanding. The journal declined to respond. The Japanese Society of Nursing Science subsequently issued an official statement concerning the paper, stating that an independent special committee had found the peer-review process to have been conducted appropriately and that no clear research misconduct had been identified. The Society also noted that its conflict-of-interest guidelines had subsequently been revised to include non-financial interests.

==== Expert statements ====
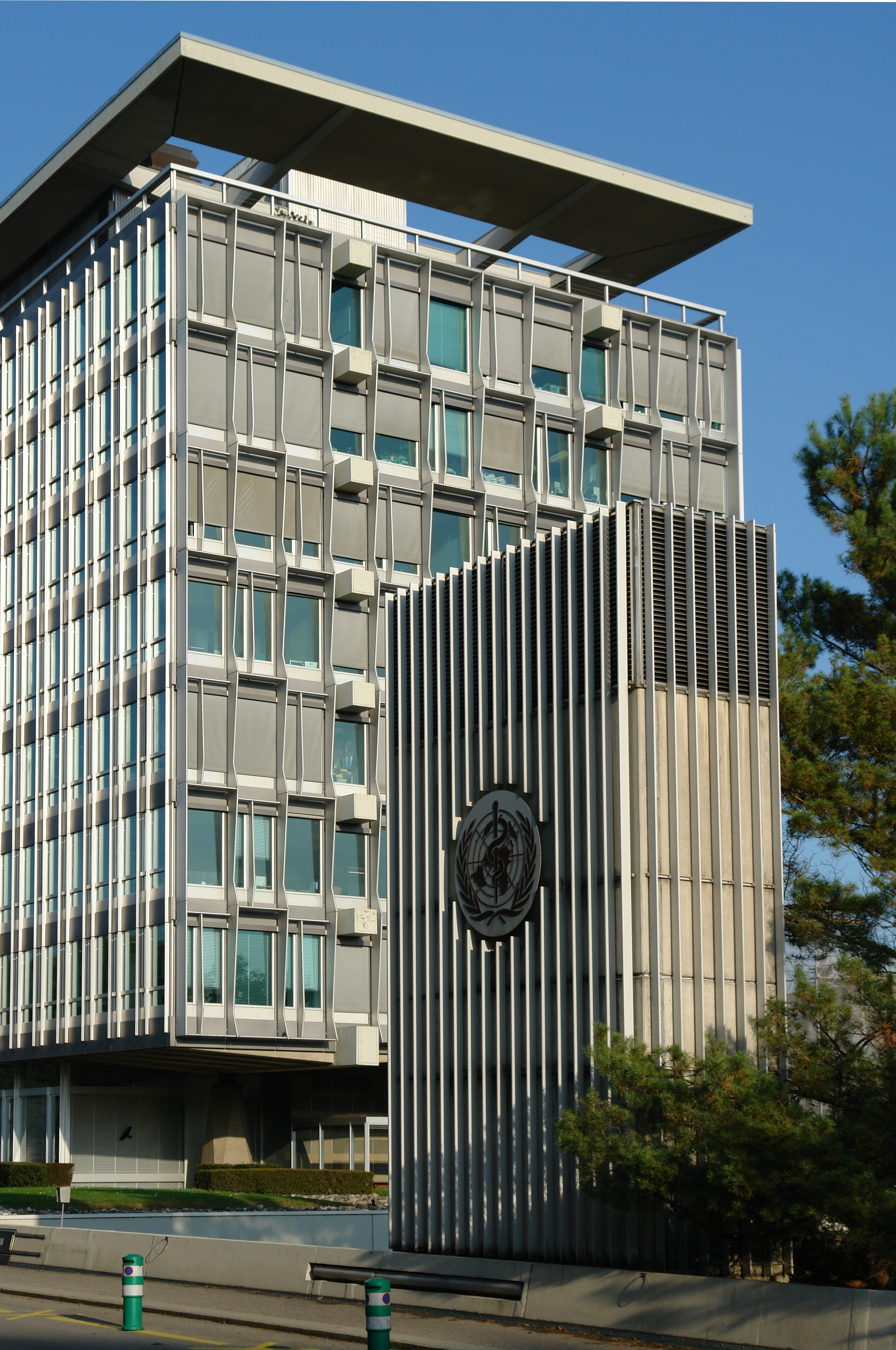
World Health Organization headquarters in Geneva

In December 2015, the World Health Organization's Global Advisory Committee on Vaccine Safety (GACVS) issued a statement explicitly criticizing Japan's continued suspension of proactive recommendation for the HPV vaccine. The committee noted that Japan had not resumed recommendation despite expert consensus that no causal link existed between the vaccine and reported symptoms, and warned that young women were being left vulnerable to HPV-related cancers that otherwise could be prevented. GACVS further stated: "Policy decisions based on weak evidence, leading to lack of use of safe and effective vaccines, can result in real harm." Japan was the only country named in the statement, marking an unusually direct rebuke from an international health authority. The Lancet also described the situation as an "HPV vaccination crisis in Japan". In April 2016, 17 Japanese medical societies issued a joint statement urging the resumption of proactive HPV vaccine recommendation. The statement cited data from the Ministry of Health indicating that only 186 individuals—approximately 0.002% of total doses administered—remained under medical care for unresolved adverse events.

At the 19th Joint Meeting of the Subcommittee on Adverse Reactions held on 23 May 2016, both the GACVS statement and the joint declaration of the 17 academic societies were distributed merely as reference materials rather than formal agenda items. Committee member Nobuhiko Okabe 岡部信彦, director of Kawasaki City Institute for Public Health and himself a GACVS member, intervened after the committee had already reached a provisional conclusion of no policy change, requesting that the reference materials be explained, and subsequently introduced both documents to the committee himself. The committee nonetheless concluded that no change to the current policy was necessary.

In August 2016, a group of senior Japanese medical experts—including the presidents of the Japan Medical Association and the Japan Association of Obstetricians and Gynecologists—submitted a letter to the Director of the Health Bureau at the Ministry of Health, Labour and Welfare. The letter included signatures from 341 researchers from over 50 countries who had participated in EUROGIN 2016 (European Research Organization on Genital Infection and Neoplasia). The statement warned: "The symptoms reported in Japan have not been shown to be causally related to the HPV vaccine. Japan's inappropriate policy decisions are having a negative impact on global vaccine confidence."

==== Epidemiological study by Sofue Group ====
In response to public concern over adverse events following HPV vaccination, the Ministry of Health, Labour and Welfare commissioned a large-scale epidemiological study led by Dr. Tomotaka Sofue (祖父江友孝) at the Osaka Center for Cancer and Disease Prevention. The study aimed to evaluate the prevalence of reported symptoms among vaccinated and unvaccinated adolescent girls across Japan. The researchers found that symptoms such as chronic pain, motor dysfunction, and cognitive complaints were not significantly more frequent among vaccinated individuals compared to unvaccinated controls.

==== Professional response to scientific evidence ====
A 2017 survey of physicians who had trained at Osaka University Hospital's Department of Obstetrics and Gynecology or its affiliated institutions revealed significant awareness of international scientific evidence. Among the 259 respondents, 66.5% were aware of the World Health Organization's (WHO's) 2015 statement affirming HPV vaccine safety, and 71.5% were aware of the Sofue epidemiological study commissioned by the Ministry of Health. Furthermore, 72.7% agreed with findings supporting the vaccine's safety, and 84.3% agreed with its efficacy.

==== Case reports and clinical observations ====
In a 2017 study, Takahashi Yukitoshi and colleagues at the National Hospital Organization Shizuoka Institute of Epilepsy and Neurological Disorders analyzed cases that exhibited prolonged neurological symptoms after HPV vaccination and reported elevated levels of IL-17, IL-8, and MCP-1 in the cerebrospinal fluid, suggesting possible involvement in central sensitization and hyperalgesia.

A research group led by Professor Noriomi Matsumura (松村謙臣) and Professor Ikuo Tsunoda (角田郁) at the Faculty of Medicine, Kindai University conducted a computational analysis of the “molecular mimicry hypothesis,” which has been cited as a basis for claims that HPV vaccination causes neurological symptoms and autoimmune reactions, and found no supporting evidence. The study demonstrated that no molecular mimicry exists between HPV vaccine antigens and human proteins that could trigger autoimmune responses. The findings were published in January 2026 in the peer-reviewed journal International Journal of Clinical Oncology.

Following the 2016 controversy, the Ministry of Health, Labour and Welfare continued to support grant-funded research on HPV vaccine safety and on patients reporting symptoms after HPV vaccination through multiple research projects, including projects led by Nobuhiko Okabe and Shuichi Ikeda.

=== Adverse event litigation ===
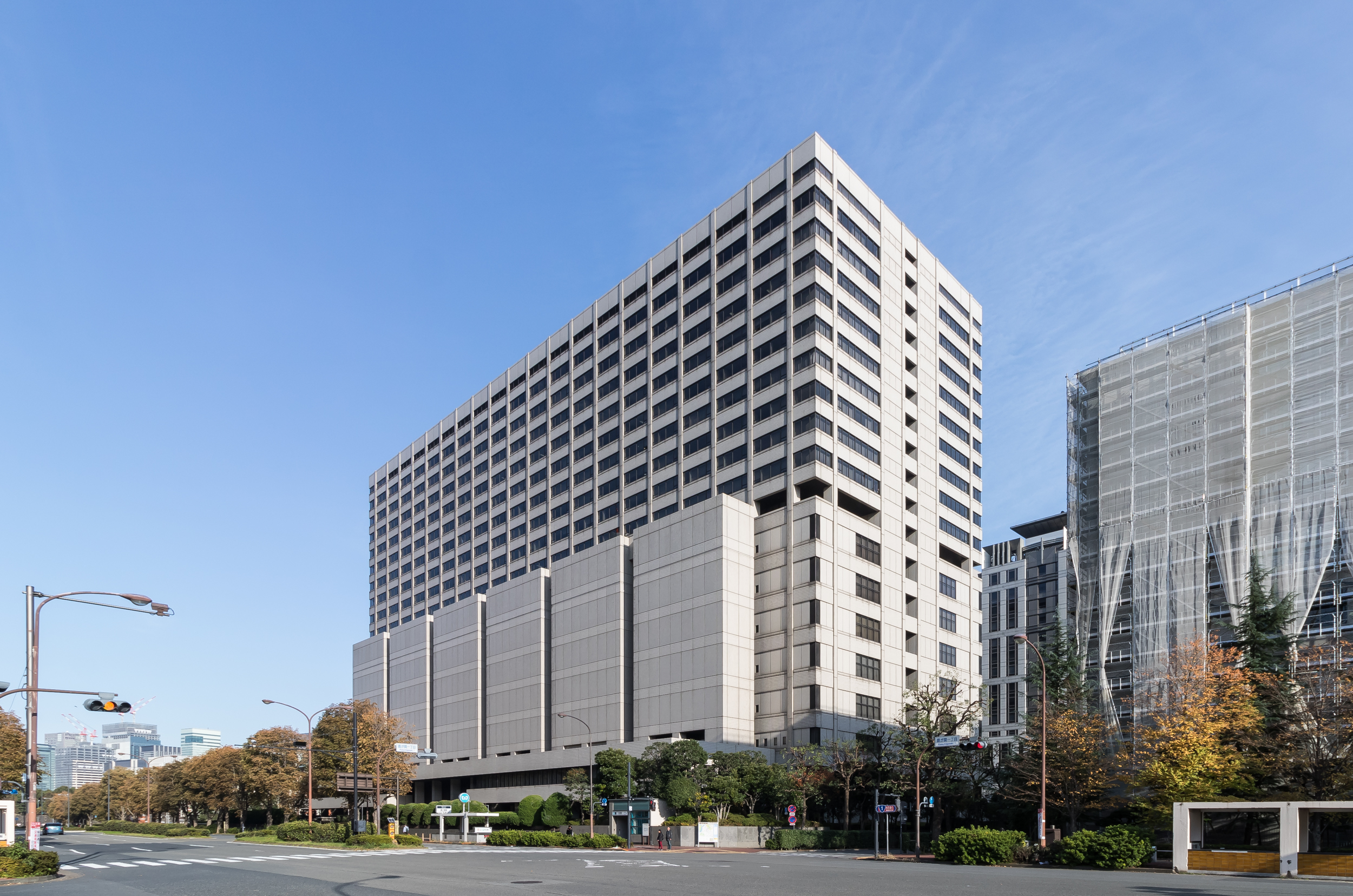
Tokyo District Court building in Kasumigaseki, Tokyo

In 2016, the National Liaison Association of Cervical Cancer Vaccine Victims filed lawsuits in four district courts. An attorney representing MSD stated that, as of May 2023, there were 117 plaintiffs: 92 had receivedCervarix and 25 had received Gardasil. Legal proceedings related to alleged adverse events from the HPV vaccine have been ongoing in Japan since 2016. The lawsuits, filed by individuals claiming long-term health effects, target both the national government and pharmaceutical companies. After years of expert testimony and plaintiff hearings across multiple district courts, a final ruling is currently scheduled for April 2027.

In 2017, a peer-reviewed article published in the Indian Journal of Medical Ethics offered a critical analysis of Japan's HPV vaccine policy from a medical ethics perspective. The authors highlighted unresolved adverse reactions involving multiple organ systems, questioned the adequacy of the Ministry of Health's response, and criticized international safety assessments—particularly those by the WHO—for failing to account for genetic susceptibility and complex symptom patterns. All authors are members of Medwatcher Japan (薬害オンブズパースン会議), a pharmaceutical watchdog NGO whose secretary-general serves as co-representative of the national legal team in HPV vaccine-related lawsuits.

In August 2024, MSD, the defendant in the HPV vaccine lawsuit, issued a public statement addressing the claims. The company noted that many plaintiffs reported symptoms more than one year after vaccination, and emphasized that there is no scientifically or medically reliable evidence linking such delayed symptoms—or even those occurring shortly after vaccination—to the vaccine itself. MSD further stated that some reported conditions may have predated vaccination, and stressed the importance of accurate diagnosis and appropriate treatment.

== Resumption and recovery (2021–) ==
The resumption of proactive recommendations followed a renewed review of HPV vaccine safety and the policy framework for recommending vaccination. After the eight-year suspension, proactive recommendations resumed in April 2022, followed by efforts to restore vaccination uptake and provide catch-up vaccination to those who had missed routine vaccination during the suspension.

=== Resumption of proactive recommendations ===
The suspension of proactive recommendation had itself been decided by the Subcommittee on Adverse Reactions in June 2013. At a joint session of the Subcommittee on Adverse Reactions and the Drug Safety Subcommittee of the Pharmaceutical Affairs Council held on October 1, 2021, the question of resumption was placed on the agenda. Several committee members questioned whether this body was the appropriate forum for such a determination. Member Hamada argued that the subcommittee's role should be limited to concluding that safety concerns had been resolved, and that the decision to resume proactive recommendation should properly rest with the Vaccination and Vaccine Subcommittee, where administrative officials were also represented. Member Hasegawa similarly stated that it was more appropriate for the adverse reaction body to offer its view on safety, while the decision on which vaccines to recommend proactively should be made elsewhere. Nonetheless, at a subsequent joint session held on November 12, 2021, the conclusion to resume proactive recommendation was reached within the same adverse reaction framework. The Ministry of Health, Labour and Welfare states that the issue was subsequently discussed by expert committees on an ongoing basis. At a meeting on November 12, 2021, the experts concluded that there were no particular safety concerns and that the benefits of HPV vaccination clearly outweighed the risks of adverse reactions. They also considered it appropriate to end the withholding of proactive recommendations while continuing to evaluate vaccine safety, strengthening medical and regional support systems for people who developed symptoms after vaccination, and improving information provision. Based on this assessment, the Ministry decided on November 26, 2021, to end the withholding of proactive recommendations, with individual notifications to resume from April 2022. Following the resumption of proactive recommendations, municipalities resumed actively informing eligible individuals and their parents about HPV vaccination, including through individual notices and informational leaflets describing the vaccine's effectiveness and safety.

Dr. Tomohiro Morio, chair of the Ministry of Health, Labour and Welfare’s Adverse Reactions Review Panel, stated in an interview that the decision to resume active promotion of the HPV vaccine was based on the accumulation of domestic and international studies demonstrating its efficacy and safety, which enabled the government to present supporting data. He also noted that the rollout of COVID-19 vaccination improved the vaccination environment in Japan, as medical personnel became more accustomed to administering intramuscular injections.

In Japan, the HPV vaccine is classified as a Category A disease under the Immunization Act (Japan), and Article 9 of the Act stipulates that eligible individuals and their guardians have a "duty to make efforts" to receive the vaccination. After a review by the Ministry of Health, Labour and Welfare, which found no specific safety concerns, proactive recommendations were officially resumed in November 2021, with municipalities restarting individual invitations from April 2022. Lancet Oncology described the resumption of active HPV vaccine recommendations in Japan after 8.5 years of suspension, noting that vaccination coverage had stagnated below 1% during the suspension period despite evidence supporting vaccine safety and effectiveness.

A petition calling for resumed availability of vaccination for university-aged women who missed the opportunity due to the suspension of proactive recommendations gathered approximately 13,000 signatures in a single day. In response, the government decided to offer catch-up vaccinations to affected cohorts until March 2025. Furthermore, those who receive their first dose by March 2025 will be eligible to complete the series free of charge during fiscal year 2025.

In November 2021, a coalition of local assembly members promoting HPV vaccination was established in Japan. Among its members was Arakawa ward assembly member and idol Aki Natsume (夏目亜季), who had been diagnosed with cervical cancer at the age of 23.

=== Catch-up program ===
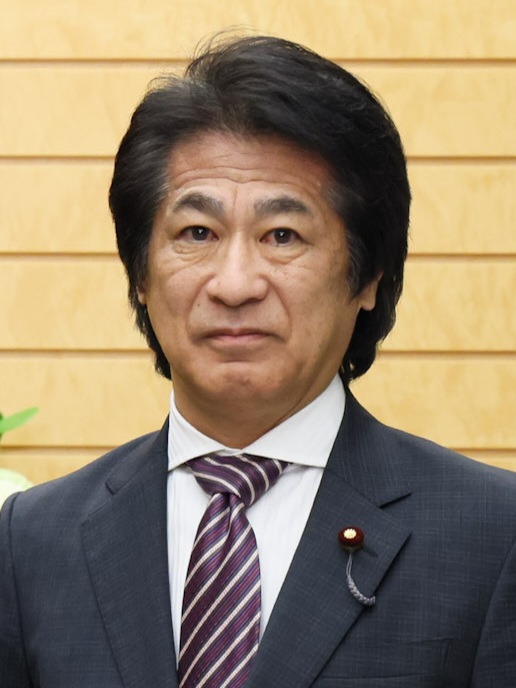
Tamura in 2025

In November 2021, Japan's Ministry of Health, Labour and Welfare (MHLW) announced that proactive recommendations for the HPV vaccine would resume starting in April 2022. Meanwhile, Norihisa Tamura, who had served as Minister of Health, Labour and Welfare when the government suspended proactive recommendations for the HPV vaccine in 2013, stated at a parliamentary meeting in December 2021—held to discuss resuming active recommendation—that “I feel as though I bear a cross myself.” Media reports described this remark as reflecting his regret over the many years during which the recommendation could not be reinstated.

In January 2022, the MHLW finalized the implementation of a publicly funded "catch-up vaccination" program for women born between fiscal years 1997 and 2005, who had missed the opportunity to receive the vaccine during the suspension period. The ministry also announced plans to reimburse individuals who had paid out-of-pocket for HPV vaccination during that time. Proactive recommendation resumed in April 2022. That year, 540,681 individuals received their first dose. In fiscal year 2024, total first-dose recipients rose to 1,513,862, including 429,652 routine and 1,084,210 catch-up recipients.

In June 2023, the National Cancer Center Japan published the "2023 Fact Sheet on the Prevention of Cervical Cancer and Other HPV-Related Cancers." The report highlighted that Japan's cervical cancer mortality rate remains higher than in other developed countries, having risen since the 1980s while other high-income countries sharply reduced their rates through screening, and emphasized the effectiveness and safety of HPV vaccination and screening. The Center recommended both measures as essential components of prevention. At the press conference, Kota Katanoda (片野田耕太), head of the Center's Division of Data Science, described Japan's cervical cancer situation as miserable compared with other developed countries and said the Center itself had failed to provide the scientific information it should have during the suspension period, characterizing the fact sheet as an attempt to reset the discussion on an evidence-based footing.

=== Controversy over MEXT's Educational Guidance ===
In November 2022, Japan's Ministry of Education, Culture, Sports, Science and Technology (MEXT), through its Medical Education Division, sent a notice to universities with faculties of medicine, pharmacy, and related fields. The notice included a request letter from a citizens' group that claims symptoms reported after HPV vaccination constitute "drug-induced harm," and encouraged institutions to conduct classes on pharmaceutical injury based on this material. A MEXT official later stated that the ministry had not been directly informed by the Ministry of Health, Labour and Welfare (MHLW) about the updated status of the HPV vaccine, which had resumed proactive recommendation earlier that fiscal year. Although the HPV Vaccine Parliamentary League of the Liberal Democratic Party requested a correction, MEXT's follow-up notice in December 2022 did not retract the original guidance. Instead, it added a clarification that the request letter from the citizens' group should be treated as supplementary material, without changing the ministry's treatment of the claims regarding HPV vaccine-related harm.

=== Supply management during demand recovery ===
In 2020, shipment adjustments occurred amid increased demand for HPV vaccines. Following the November 2021 announcement to resume proactive recommendations, the MHLW conducted surveys to monitor municipal implementation. Survey responses documented operational challenges including staff shortages, difficulties managing multiple age cohorts simultaneously, complexities in tracking vaccination history for mobile populations, and reported concerns about explaining vaccine safety given historical controversies.

== Public communication and media ==
The adverse reaction controversy received extensive media coverage but later received less attention, while support for HPV vaccination grew on social media.

=== Media coverage of alleged HPV vaccine adverse reaction cases ===
After the suspension of proactive recommendation in 2013, Japanese television repeatedly broadcast footage of girls experiencing alleged adverse effects, such as involuntary movements and difficulty walking. According to Yutaka Ishiwata (石渡 勇), then-president of the Japan Society of Obstetrics and Gynecology, such images were aired "more than 80 times in a single day," amplifying parental fears and fueling vaccine hesitancy. BuzzFeed Japan reported that many parents were alarmed by repeated television broadcasts, which created a powerful impression despite the absence of scientific evidence of causality. A 2014 report by the Center for Strategic and International Studies (CSIS) concluded that the local government's recognition of adverse cases in Suginami Ward, combined with sensational newspaper, television, and online coverage, contributed to the national halt of promotion. Journalist and physician Riko Muranaka (村中璃子) argued in Wedge Online in 2015 that the gap between scientific evidence and media portrayal left affected families in distress and reinforced public distrust.

=== Media silence and gradual recovery ===
During the years following the suspension of proactive HPV vaccine recommendations in Japan, mainstream media provided limited sustained coverage. Commentators have described this prolonged silence as a distinctive feature of the Japanese case. As evidence supporting vaccine safety and efficacy accumulated, public anxiety gradually softened. A media analysis noted that coverage became more balanced around 2020, helping to shift public sentiment and enabling the resumption of government recommendations.

Japan’s kisha club (press club) system is an exclusive network of reporters affiliated with government ministries and agencies. It has been criticized for promoting uniform, press-release-based reporting and for discouraging independent or investigative journalism and is often cited as a structural factor limiting press freedom in Japan. Masami Kojima, a journalist and former Mainichi Shimbun reporter, said that when he wanted to write about Riko Muranaka's 2017 John Maddox Prize, his editor at the time blocked the piece, citing fear of protests from citizen advocacy groups. He noted that around that time, after the Sankei Shimbun published an article on the HPV vaccine's effectiveness, a protest letter was posted at the MHLW press club.

A 2025 computational analysis of social media discourse identified key shifts in public sentiment in 2013, 2016, and 2020, corresponding to major policy and media events. Using large language models, the study found that misinformation peaked in 2012 and stabilized thereafter, while discourse around vaccine effectiveness gradually increased. The authors also noted that HPV vaccine experiences were frequently invoked in discussions about COVID-19 vaccination, suggesting a cross-vaccine influence on public attitudes.

=== Social media and public discourse ===
The original version of the X logo

On September 25, 2024, the terms "HPV vaccine" and "cervical cancer" trended on X (formerly Twitter) in Japan. Users shared vaccination experiences and praised one another. Obstetricians and vaccine advocates welcomed the change. A preliminary 2026 study of posts on the platform, based on a limited sample and short observation period, reported a “praise movement” characterized by predominantly positive sentiment.

Journalist Eito Suzuki (鈴木エイト) posted courtroom observations from the HPV vaccine litigation on X in August 2024, receiving over 18 million impressions. His reporting highlighted that plaintiffs had pre-existing conditions and psychosocial challenges prior to vaccination. Some had been diagnosed with HANS (Health Anxiety Neuro-Syndrome) and certified for compensation by the PMDA, leading some to abandon cognitive behavioral therapy.

=== Media coverage and civic perspectives ===
Journalist Naoko Iwanaga of BuzzFeed Japan documented the experiences of mothers navigating HPV vaccine decisions amid government silence and media confusion. Her reporting highlighted the lack of individualized notifications, the emotional burden of vaccine hesitancy, and the role of misinformation in shaping public perception. Iwanaga also covered the defamation lawsuit against Dr. Riko Muranaka, noting the chilling effect on scientific journalism and the broader media silence that followed. The work of Dr. Riko Muranaka received international attention and was cited in discussions about vaccine communication and public trust.

Minpapi (short for "Minna de shirou HPV project") is a non-profit initiative founded in 2017 by gynecologist Kanako Inaba. The organization aims to promote accurate public understanding of HPV infection and vaccination through physician-supervised articles, social media outreach, and policy advocacy. Minpapi has collaborated with municipalities, media outlets, and digital platforms to address gaps in vaccine awareness, especially among young women who missed routine vaccination due to the suspension of proactive recommendation. In 2023, Minpapi partnered with the Florence Group to launch a campaign titled "HPV vaccine for boys too," offering free vaccinations to boys aged 9–18 in selected clinics. The initiative highlighted gender disparities in vaccine access and called for public funding of male vaccination. In a 2025 narrative review published in Vaccine, researchers analyzed the sociopolitical roots of HPV vaccine hesitancy in Japan. The review identified three major contributing factors: prolonged governmental suspension of proactive recommendations (2013–2021), intensified media sensationalism, and insufficient direct communication from healthcare providers. The authors cited citizen-led outreach efforts such as the Minpapi project as key responses to this institutional silence. A 2021 study published in Vaccine by researchers including Takahiro Kinoshita (木下喬弘) and Michael R. Reich of the Harvard T.H. Chan School of Public Health analyzed the decline in HPV vaccine confidence in Japan. The authors attributed the drop in coverage to a combination of sensationalized media reports, delayed government response, and erosion of public trust. They emphasized that rebuilding vaccine confidence requires transparent communication and stronger engagement between health authorities and the public.

In a 2025 survey conducted by the Japan Cancer Society with 5,788 respondents, HPV vaccination experience increased across all age groups compared to the previous year’s survey. Regarding the reasons for receiving the HPV vaccine, the most common response overall was “because information about the HPV vaccine was provided by the national or local government,” cited by 38.8% of respondents. Whereas negative opinions were more prevalent in the previous survey, positive opinions ranked highest in this survey. As for consultation behavior, the largest proportion of respondents reported that they had not consulted anyone, followed by 36.7% who consulted their mothers.

=== Public health communication and education ===
Following the resumption of proactive recommendations, researchers have focused on developing evidence-based educational interventions to improve parental decision-making regarding HPV vaccination. A 2024 research project at Ishikawa Prefectural Nursing University is developing two types of educational content for parents: knowledge-based materials centered on medical and statistical information, and narrative-based materials featuring testimonies from cancer survivors and their families. A 2026 seven-country comparative study published in the Journal of Global Health positioned Japan as a case with a contrasting pattern of recovery compared with Denmark and Ireland. The study found that vaccination coverage also declined sharply in Denmark and Ireland following the spread of concerns through television coverage and parent groups. However, both countries launched coordinated campaigns involving governments, medical organizations, and cancer societies within several years and subsequently recovered their vaccination coverage. In contrast, Japan took nine years to resume active recommendation after its suspension in 2013, and vaccination coverage remained at approximately 39% as of 2024, making Japan the case with the slowest recovery among the seven countries studied. The study identified delayed responses as contributing to a situation in which “the floor was left open to those spreading misinformation,” and highlighted as lessons the importance of responding within days of a crisis, establishing coordinated responses across political, medical, and community sectors, and consistently communicating credible messages centered on cancer prevention through both traditional and social media.

== Male HPV vaccination ==
The issue has been repeatedly considered by MHLW advisory committees, but routine vaccination for males has not been introduced due to cost-effectiveness concerns.

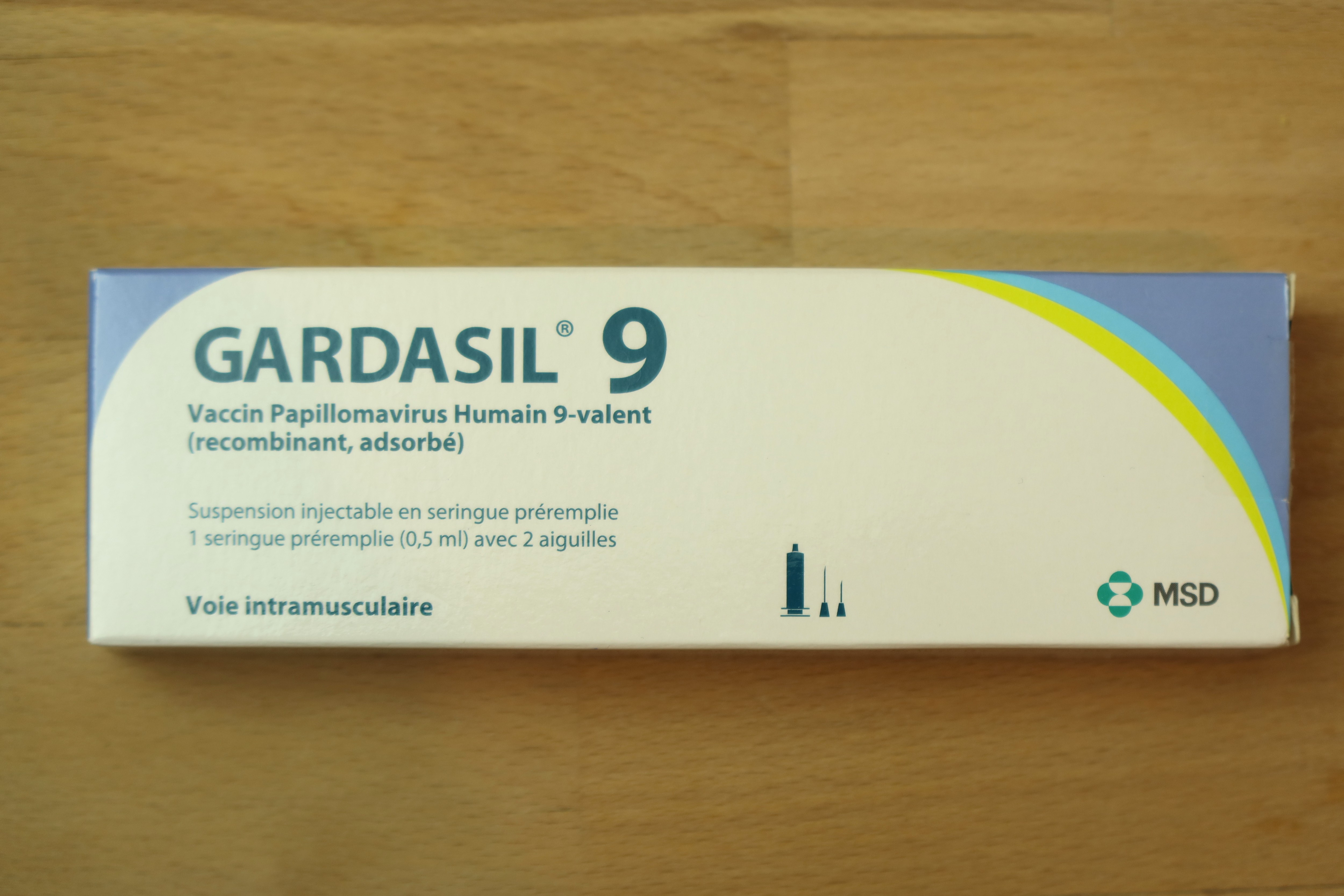
Gardasil 9 vaccine

On December 4, 2020, the MHLW approved Gardasil for use in males. In Japan, the approved indications include prevention of anal cancer, precancerous lesions, and genital warts. Internationally, the vaccine is also approved for oropharyngeal cancer, and G7 countries have adopted gender-neutral vaccination policies. Gardasil 9 (marketed as Silgard 9 in Japan) is approved in Japan for the prevention of anal cancer, precancerous lesions, and genital warts. In August 2025, Japan approved the use of the 9-valent HPV vaccine for males. However, as of that date, the vaccine remains available only through voluntary immunization and has not yet been included in the national routine schedule.

In September 2023, Governor Yuriko Koike (小池百合子) stated during a session of the Tokyo Metropolitan Assembly that HPV vaccination for males could help prevent male-specific cancers and contribute to herd immunity when administered to both sexes. She announced that the Tokyo Metropolitan Government would consider financial support for municipalities implementing such programs. Tokyo also indicated its intention to urge the national government to accelerate consideration of routine HPV vaccination for males, while simultaneously exploring support for municipalities that had already begun subsidizing such programs. In its fiscal year 2024 budget request, the Tokyo Metropolitan Bureau of Social Welfare and Public Health allocated approximately ¥389 million for municipal subsidies related to male HPV vaccination. In January 2024, following the governor's budget review, Tokyo announced its policy to cover half the cost of HPV vaccination for boys in grades 6 through 10 (roughly ages 12–16), provided that local municipalities offer financial assistance.

In March 2024, an advisory committee of the Ministry of Health, Labour and Welfare (MHLW) reviewed the cost‑effectiveness of introducing routine HPV vaccination for boys. Using a Markov model to estimate the direct preventive effects on various HPV‑related diseases in males, the analysis reported that, when limited to the prevention of male HPV‑related conditions, the cost‑effectiveness of male HPV vaccination substantially exceeded commonly used thresholds. In a subsequent review in September 2025, the committee again concluded that additional evidence was required before routine vaccination could be considered, and the discussion was continued without a decision. In July 2026, an advisory committee of the Ministry of Health, Labour and Welfare (MHLW) continued its deliberations on routine HPV vaccination for males, with a decision to continue discussions amid concerns over cost-effectiveness. Committee members emphasized that factors beyond cost-effectiveness, including gender equity and increasing overall HPV vaccination coverage, should also be considered. South Korea was cited as an example of a country that had introduced public HPV vaccination for males without relying solely on cost-effectiveness as the basis for the policy.

In response, a coalition of 32 academic societies—including the Japan Pediatric Society and the Japanese Urological Association—submitted a formal request to the MHLW in October 2025 calling for the introduction of routine HPV vaccination for males. On November 20, Norihisa Tamura, a member of the House of Representatives and chair of the bipartisan Parliamentary League for Promoting HPV Vaccination, expressed concern at a joint meeting with the League of Local Assembly Members for Promoting HPV Vaccination that, if Japan were to remain the only country where male oropharyngeal cancer persists due to the absence of routine male vaccination, the government might face future litigation for administrative inaction. He strongly urged the government to move forward with routine vaccination for boys.

== Impact and consequences ==
The suspension of proactive HPV vaccine recommendations in Japan has been associated with significant public health consequences. Multiple studies have estimated that this policy will result in more than 20,000 excess cases of cervical cancer and over 5,000 excess deaths among women born around the year 2000.

Clinical cases have also illustrated the potential consequences of delayed cervical cancer prevention and diagnosis. In January 2021, researchers from the National Cancer Center Japan reported two cases of neonatal lung cancer caused by transmission of HPV-positive cervical cancer cells from mother to infant during birth. The cases, published in The New England Journal of Medicine, highlighted the clinical consequences of delayed cervical cancer diagnosis and underscored the importance of HPV vaccination as a preventive measure.

The impact of Japan's HPV vaccine controversy has also attracted international attention. In January 2026, Nature published an article titled “What happens if fewer children get vaccinated? Japan holds lessons for the US”, discussing Japan's experience in the context of policies by Robert F. Kennedy Jr. that were expected to reduce vaccination rates in the United States.
