= Shūichi Katō (critic) =

Japanese critic and author (1919–2008)

- Born: 19 September 1919
- Died: 5 December 2008 (aged 89)

Shūichi Katō (加藤 周一, Katō Shūichi; 19 September 1919 – 5 December 2008) was a Japanese critic and author best known for his works on literature and culture.

== Biography ==
Born in Tokyo, Katō trained as a medical doctor at the University of Tokyo during World War II, specializing in haematology. The experience of living under Japan’s fascist government and the American bombing of Tokyo would shape a lifelong opposition to war, especially nuclear arms, and imperialism. It was also in this period that he began to write.

In the immediate postwar period, Katō joined a Japanese-American research team to assess the effects of the atomic bombing of Hiroshima. He subsequently travelled to Paris for a research fellowship at the Pasteur Institute. When he returned to Japan, he turned to writing full-time. After participating in a 1958 conference of writers from Asia and Africa, he gave up practicing medicine entirely.

While being deeply focused on Japanese culture and classical Chinese literature, Katō gained a reputation for examining Japan through both domestic and foreign perspectives. He served as lecturer at Yale University, professor at the Free University of Berlin and the University of British Columbia, guest professor at Ritsumeikan University (Dept. of International Relations), and curator of the Kyoto Museum for World Peace. From 1980 until his death, he wrote a widely read column in the evening culture pages of the Asahi Shimbun in which he discussed society, culture, and international relations from a literate and resolutely leftist perspective.

In 2004, he formed a group with philosopher Shunsuke Tsurumi and novelist Kenzaburō Ōe to defend the war-renouncing Article 9 of the Constitution of Japan.

He was a polyglot fluent in English, French, German, Italian and Chinese.

== Selected works ==
- Form, Style, Tradition: Reflections on Japanese Art and Society, Berkeley, University of California Press (1971)
- A History of Japanese Literature: From the Manyoshu to Modern Times, Tokyo, Kodansha International (1979)
- A Sheep's Song: A Writer's Reminiscences of Japan and the World, Berkeley and Los Angeles: University of California Press (1999)
- The Japan-China phenomenon: Conflict or compatibility?, Kodansha America (1974)
- Six Lives/Six Deaths: Portraits from Modern Japan by Robert Jay Lifton, Shuichi Kato, and Michael R. Reich, Yale University Press, New Haven (1979)
