= Mohammad Razai =

British doctor and researcher

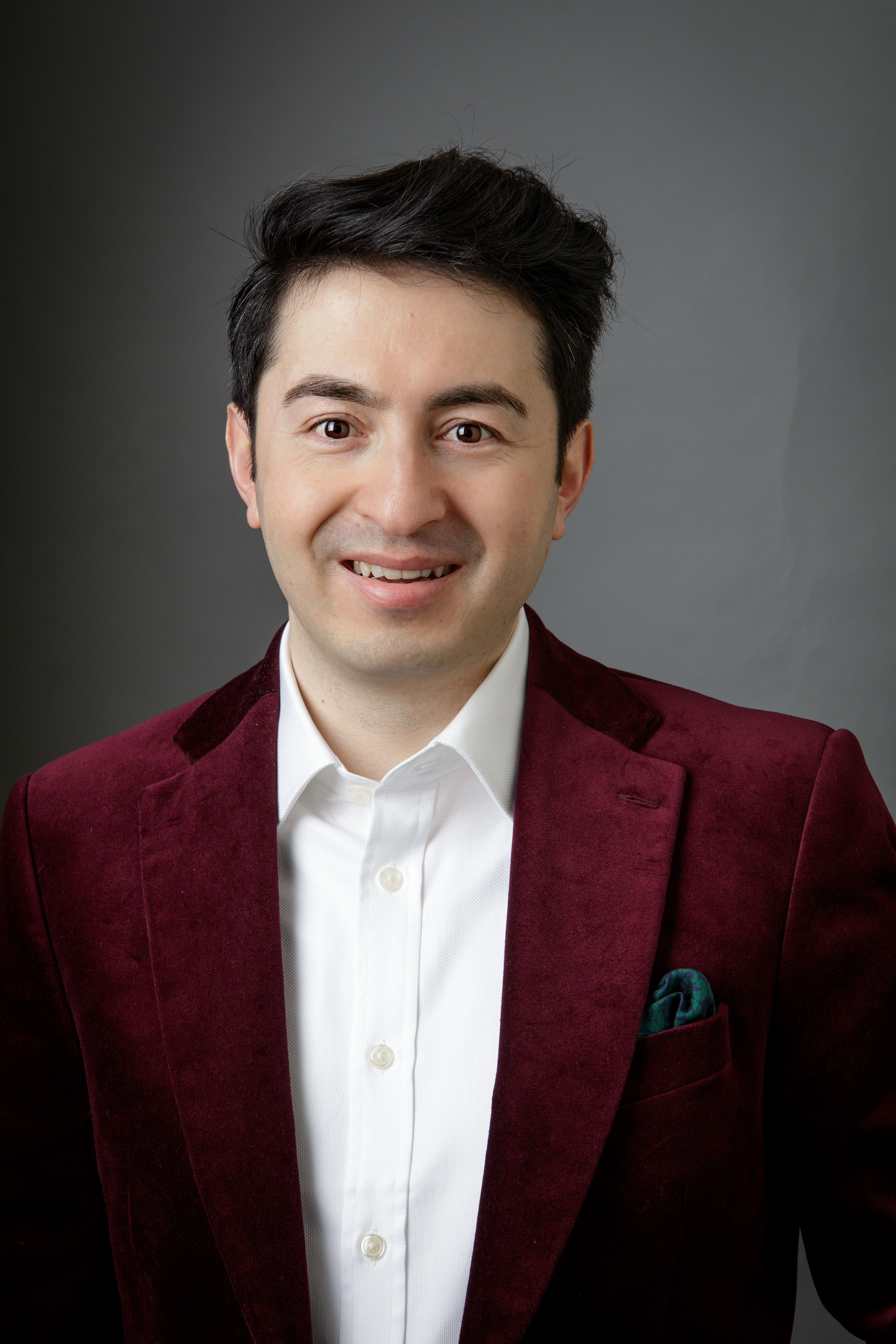
- Born: Kabul, Afghanistan
- Education: University of Cambridge
- Occupations: Medical doctor and writer
- Known for: Research in healthcare
- Medical career
- Field: Medicine, humanities, creative writing
- Institutions: University of Cambridge and St George's University of London
- Sub-specialties: General practice, medical humanities, poetry, and medical writing
- Awards: John Maddox Prize 2021
- Website: https://www.sgul.ac.uk/profiles/mohammad-razai

Mohammad Sharif Razai is a physician, poet, author and researcher. He was awarded the 2021 John Maddox Prize as an early career researcher, by Sense about Science and Nature for his work on racial health inequalities.

== Early life and education ==
Razai was born in Afghanistan and came to the UK when he was 14. He studied medicine at the University of Cambridge.

== Career ==
Razai works as a medical doctor in the UK's National Health Service, as lecturer and researcher at University of Cambridge and as a research fellow at St George's University of London.

Razai's writings deal with health inequalities in particular during the COVID-19 pandemic. Mohammad Razai is also a published poet and has written for the Poetry Review, Brittle Stars, Tears in the Fence, Under the Radar , Brixton Review of Books and other poetry magazines. He also contributes to the BMJ Opinion regularly on a wide range of topics.

== Awards and honours ==
Razai was awarded the John Maddox Prize in 2021 as an early career research. In 2021, there were over 100 nominations from across 23 countries, with the winners announced in a ceremony at the Wellcome Collection. The winners were chosen by an international panel of judges and were presented their awards following comments from Tracey Brown, director of Sense about Science, Nature editor-in-chief Magdalena Skipper and Bronwen Maddox, daughter of the late John Maddox. On receiving the award, Razai paid tribute to family members who had just fled Afghanistan. "No matter what obstacles and challenges we may face as scientists in the global north, it is not the same as Afghan scientists, especially women and those from racial minorities, who literally pay with their lives in speaking truth and standing up for their rights," he said. "I remember them and dedicate this prize to them."

In 2021, he received St George's University's excellence in public/civic engagement research award for his work to tackle ethnic and societal health disparities and inequalities.

Razai also received an award during his training as a doctor for his work during the COVID-19 pandemic by Pulse magazine.

In 2021, he was awarded a research fellowship by the National Institute for Health and Care Research (NIHR).

== Selected publications ==
- Razai MS, Mansour R, Goldsmith L, Freeman S, Mason-Apps C, Ravindran P, Kooner P, Berendes S, Morris J, Majeed A, Ussher M, Hargreaves S, Oakeshott P. Interventions to increase vaccination against COVID-19, influenza and pertussis during pregnancy: a systematic review and meta-analysis. J Travel Med. 2023 Dec 28;30(8):taad138. https://doi.org/10.1093/jtm/taad138
- Razai, Mohammad Sharif; Oakeshott, Pippa; Kankam, Hadyn et al. (21 May 2020). Mitigating the psychological effects of social isolation during the COVID-19 pandemic BMJ 2020; 369 :m1904 doi:10.1136/bmj.m1904
- Razai Mohammad Sharif, Kankam H K N, Majeed A, Esmail A, Williams D R. (15 January 2021) Mitigating ethnic disparities in COVID-19 and beyond BMJ 2021; 372 :m4921 doi:10.1136/bmj.m4921
- Razai, Mohammad Sharif, Oakeshott Pippa, Esmail A, Wiysonge CS, Viswanath K, Mills MC. COVID-19 vaccine hesitancy: the five Cs to tackle behavioural and sociodemographic factors. Journal of the Royal Society of Medicine. 2021;114(6):295-298. doi:10.1177/01410768211018951
- Razai, Mohammad Sharif, Doerholt K, Galiza E, Oakeshott P. Tick bite BMJ 2020; 370 :m3029 doi:10.1136/bmj.m3029
- Razai, Mohammad Sharif, Chaudhry U A R, Doerholt K, Bauld L, Majeed A. COVID-19 vaccination hesitancy BMJ 2021; 373 :n1138 doi:10.1136/bmj.n1138
- Elise Paul, Daisy Fancourt, Mohammad Sharif Razai. (05 May 2022). Racial discrimination, low trust in the health system and COVID-19 vaccine uptake: a longitudinal observational study of 633 UK adults from ethnic minority groups. Journal of the Royal Society of Medicine.
