= Eucharia Oluchi Nwaichi =

Nigerian toxicology biochemist

- Born: Abia State, Nigeria
- Education: University of Port Harcourt (BSc, MSc, PhD)
- Occupations: Biochemist; Environmental scientist Toxicologist
- Years active: 2003 - present
- Known for: L'Oréal-UNESCO Awards for Women in Science; Phytoremediation

Eucharia Oluchi Nwaichi // is a Nigerian environmental biochemist, soil scientist and toxicologist.

Her research interest focus on waste management, pollution prevention and phytoremediation, which involves the treatment of environmental problems (bioremediation) through the use of local plants that mitigate the environmental problem without the need to excavate the contaminant material and dispose of it elsewhere. She is an expert in elimination of toxic heavy metal such as cadmium, copper, mercury, lead and arsenic from contaminated soil.

== Education and career ==
She holds a B.Sc., an M.Sc. and a Ph.D. in Biochemistry all from the University of Port Harcourt where she later became a senior lecturer. Before she joined the services of the University of Port Harcourt, she worked at Shell Oil Company for one year (2009 - 2010).

She was made an international fellow at the 2013 L’Oréal-UNESCO Awards in Physical Sciences. She is a member of several academic organizations, such as the Organization for Women in Science for the Developing World, American Chemical Society, International Society For Environmental Technology, International Phytotechnology Society, Society for Functional Foods and Bioactive Compounds and the Nigerian Institute of Management.

In 2022 she was awarded the John Maddox Prize.
