= David Robert Grimes =

Irish science writer (born 1985)

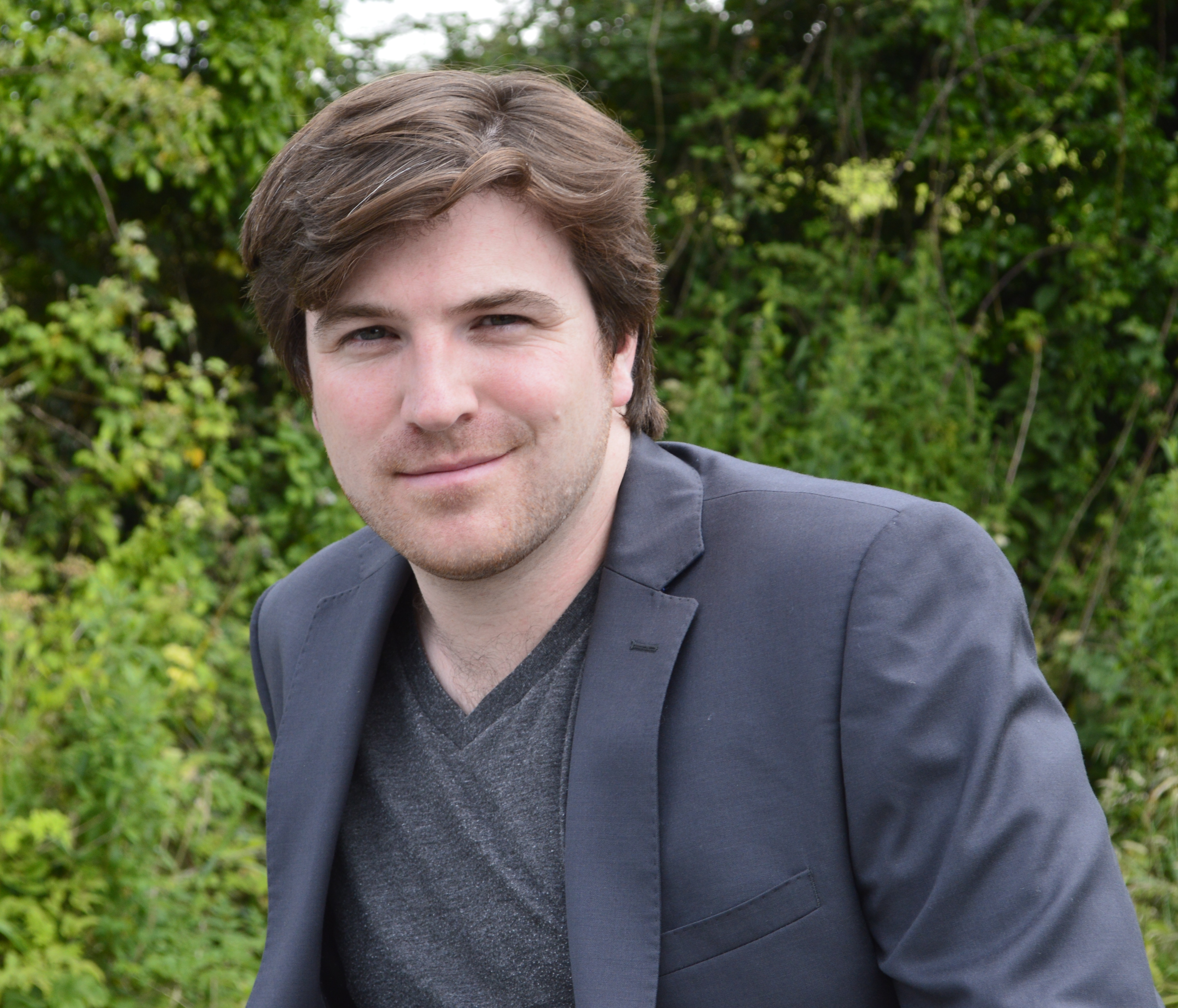
- Born: 1985 (age 40–41); Skerries, Dublin, Ireland
- Education: Dublin City University
- Occupation: Writer
- Awards: John Maddox Prize
- Website: davidrobertgrimes.com

David Robert Grimes (born 1985) is an Irish science writer with professional training in physics and cancer biology, who contributes to several media outlets on questions of science and society. He has a diverse range of research interests and is a vocal advocate for increased public understanding of science. He was the 2014 recipient of the Sense about Science/Nature Maddox Prize for "Standing up for Science in the face of Adversity", and is a fellow with the Committee for Skeptical Inquiry.

== Early life ==
David Robert Grimes, from a Skerries family, was born in Dublin in 1985. He spent over a decade in Riyadh, Saudi Arabia. As a student he was a keen musician and actor, with an interest in science. He undertook his undergraduate degree in applied physics at DCU, serving on the Student Union as faculty-wide Science and Health Convenor 2005–2006,and on the DCU drama committee, graduating in 2007 with a DCU Internal School Award, the Lyman Medal for physics.

== Professional biography ==
Grimes did doctoral work on ultraviolet radiation physics at Dublin City University funded by an Irish Research Council award, under professors Neil O'Hare and Greg Hughes, and graduated with a Ph.D. in 2011. He did a postdoctoral fellowship at the University of Oxford with Mike Partridge, and focused on medical physics and oncology, including 2015 research work on oxygen-radiation interactions (the "oxygen fixation hypothesis and oxygen enhancement ratio") about which he blogged and literature reviews on modelling tumour oxygen distribution and hypoxia in 2014), and on non-invasive imaging in 2017.

As of January 2018, Grimes had worked with Centre for Advanced and Interdisciplinary Radiation Research (CAIRR), and the School of Mathematics and Physics, Queen's University Belfast, in Belfast, United Kingdom.

As of 2022, Grimes is a fellow with the Committee for Skeptical Inquiry.

== Science outreach ==
Grimes is best known for science journalism and outreach, and has contributed to numerous publications, including Irish Times,, The Guardian, the BBC, and other outlets. His pieces focus on aspects of science and society, as well as debunking pseudoscience on topics that can be controversial in the public mind, such as vaccination, climate-change, gun control, nuclear power, public health and scientific misconceptions.

Grimes has advocated secularism in the Irish education system. He criticised Irish religious conservatives for misrepresenting the research on abortion and same-sex marriage for political purposes, acknowledging that, while they were entitled to ethical misgivings, their policy of "misrepresenting research... to bolster religious views is a transparently cynical exercise". The piece claiming misrepresented research prompted a strong rebuttal from John Murray, also in The Irish Times, that took Grimes to task, claiming various factual and interpretive errors in his piece.

=== Fluoride and cannabis campaigns ===
Grimes has been critical of anti-fluoride campaigns, in particular a 2013 Sinn Féin bill to ban fluoride in water. This stance made him the target of conspiracy theorists, and prompted a campaign to have him removed from his university post. The bill was ultimately defeated.

Grimes has also been publicly critical of a medicinal cannabis campaign by People Before Profit, specifically cure-all claims made by representatives of the campaign. He has particularly criticised dubious claims linking cannabis to cures for cancer and autism, saying that these positions are not supported by the evidence and could put patients at risk.

The work suggests that massive conspiracies should quickly collapse, and was widely covered in the media.

=== Criticism of anti-vaccine movement and false balance ===
Grimes has been particularly vocal against the anti-vaccine movement, focusing on assertions by anti-HPV vaccine groups whose arguments, Grimes says, consist of "anecdotes, emotive appeals and easily debunked assertions", opining that "lives of countless young men and women count on us being guided by evidence rather than rhetoric". In 2016, following controversy around the film Vaxxed, Grimes was drawn into a debate with former doctor Andrew Wakefield on Irish radio. Grimes later wrote of his reluctance to take part in the debate, and how providing Wakefield with any platform is false balance. He was extremely critical of the decision by Regent's University to host Wakefield, explaining that "Wakefield is a long-debunked fear merchant."

Grimes was also part of a subsequent successful campaign to have screenings of the movie pulled in both London and at the European parliament.

=== Advocating for evidence-based medicine ===
Grimes has drawn attention to charlatans who take advantage of vulnerable people using pseudoscience, particularly autistic people and cancer sufferers. Equally, he has been vocal about crowdfunding for dubious medical conditions and clinics, such as the Burzynkski clinic in Texas, US, stating that while emotive, "... raising money for such causes does not help sufferers one iota – it benefits only those with the audacity to push false hope at great expense.".

Grimes has written at length about questionable treatments for conditions such as electromagnetic hypersensitivity, which evidence suggests is a psychological rather than physiological illness, criticising clinics who claim to offer cures for the ailment. Grimes has been particularly critical of homoeopathy, both in academic work and in popular press, which has led to angry responses from homoeopaths.

=== Public understanding of science ===
Grimes states that a major challenge in communicating about science is not strictly information deficit but rather ideological bias, and that motivated reasoning is a vital factor to acknowledge. To support this claim, he points to the evidence that political leanings influence whether one accepts the scientific consensus on climate change. Similarly, he has argued, both in popular media and academically, that acceptance of nuclear power, gun control, and vaccination are strongly influenced by ideological beliefs. Grimes argues that overcoming our implicit biases and gaining a better understanding of the scientific method would improve our decision making and benefit both society and individuals.

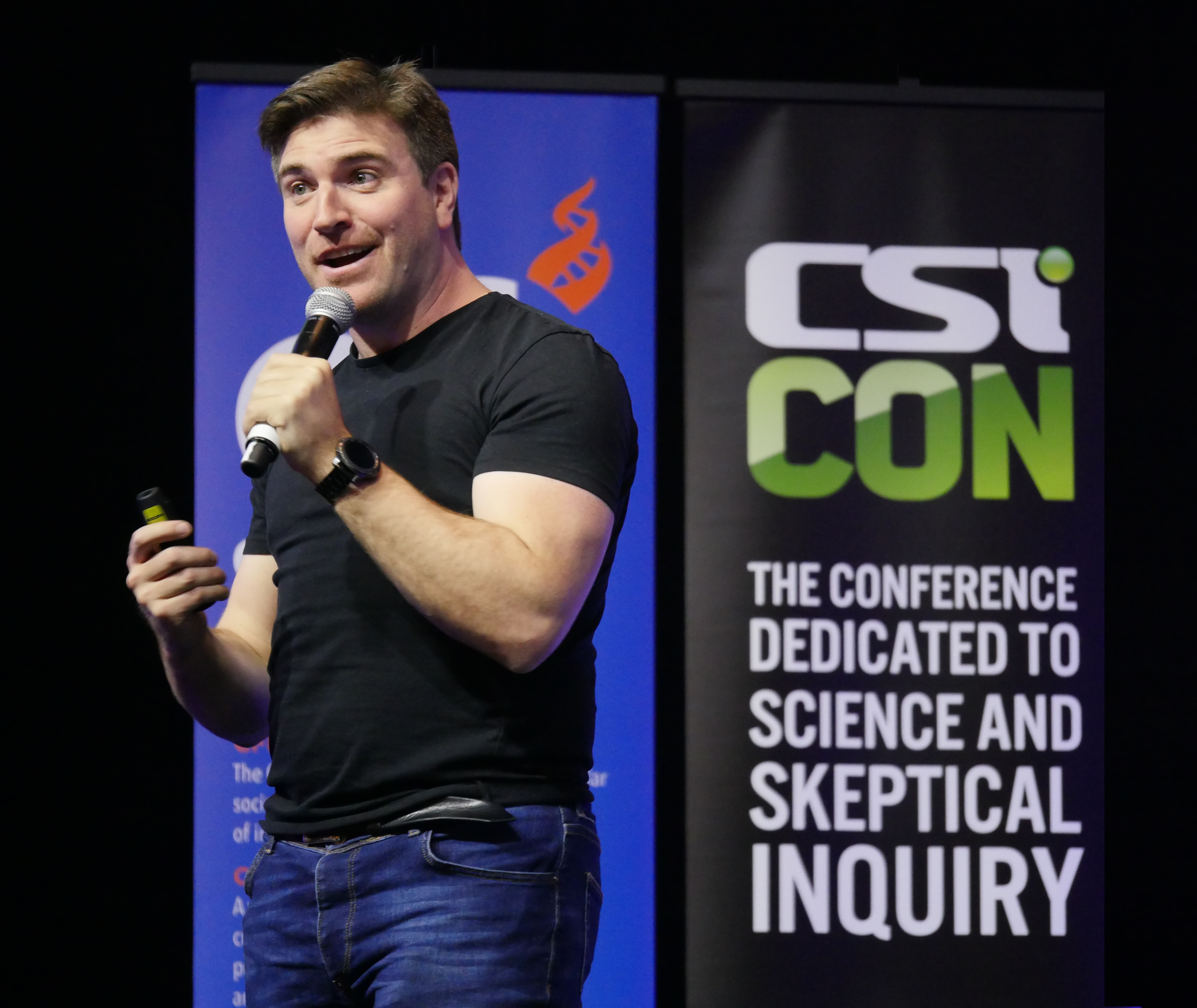
David Robert Grimes at CSICon 2022

== Awards and honours ==
In recognition of his efforts to present science despite hostility, Grimes was joint recipient of the 2014 Sense about Science / Nature Maddox Prize for standing up for science in the face of adversity, and was commended by Cancer Research UK for being "... an excellent media ambassador for CRUK, and for his efforts to dispel misconceptions in science and medicine". In 2015, he was also inducted into the Dublin City University Alumni Wall for his research and outreach work.

== Publications ==
As of October 2025, Scopus lists 57 publications by Grimes, which have been cited 1,302 times, and a h-index of 18.

=== Books ===
- Grimes, David Robert (5 September 2019). The Irrational Ape: Why Flawed Logic Puts us all at Risk and How Critical Thinking Can Save the World. Simon and Schuster – via Google books. Also published as Good Thinking: Why Flawed Logic Puts Us All at Risk and How Critical Thinking Can Save the World. in North America.

=== Selected articles ===
- On the Viability of Conspiratorial Beliefs (PLOS ONE: 2016). 26 January 2016 Vol 11, issue 1.
- Proposed Mechanisms for Homeopathy are Physically Impossible (Focus on Alternative and Complementary Therapies: 2012). Vol 17, issue 3, pages 149-155.
- String Theory–The Physics of String-Bending and Other Electric Guitar Techniques (PLOS ONE: 2014). 23 July 2014, Vol 9, issue 7.
