= John Maddox Prize =

Yearly award for standing up for science

The John Maddox Prize is an international prize administered by Sense about Science in partnership with Nature. One or two individuals are recognised annually by the Prize for their work promoting sound science and evidence despite hostility. The prize was started in 2012 in commemoration of John Maddox, former editor-in-chief of Nature, who was distinguished in his advancement of science for the public interest. Winners receive a monetary award and an announcement is published in Nature.

== Recipients ==
=== 2012 ===
In 2012, the John Maddox Prize was awarded to British psychiatrist Simon Wessely and Chinese science writer Shi-min Fang. Wessely was recognized for continuing his research on Myalgic Encephalomyelitis/Chronic Fatigue Syndrome despite criticism from patient groups, and Fang was recognized for his work exposing pseudoscience and fraud as a popular science writer in China. There have been objections to Wessely being awarded the prize, however, due to concerns about his quality of research.

=== 2013 ===
In 2013, British neuropsychopharmacologist David Nutt was awarded the John Maddox Prize for his influence on the evidence-based classification of drugs in the UK and elsewhere. He had faced adversity such as dismissal from his government position on the Advisory Council on the Misuse of Drugs.

=== 2014 ===
In 2014, the John Maddox Prize was awarded to US writer and journalist Emily Willingham and Irish physicist and science writer David Robert Grimes. Both winners are science writers who have communicated difficult science topics to the public despite intense criticism, and in Willingham's case, legal action.

=== 2015 ===
In 2015, University of Exeter academic physician Edzard Ernst and University of Oxford nutrition scientist Susan Jebb shared the John Maddox Prize. Ernst was recognized for applying evidence-based methodologies to research in complementary and alternative medicines, and for communicating this research despite severe hostility. Jebb was recognized for her work to promote evidence in public understanding of nutrition in the face of criticism and false claims of industry funding.

=== 2016 ===
Cognitive psychologist Elizabeth Loftus was awarded the 2016 John Maddox Prize for persistence in researching and communicating the evidence behind false memory.

=== 2017 ===
In 2017, Japanese doctor and journalist Riko Muranaka won the John Maddox Prize for her work countering misinformation about the HPV vaccine with science and evidence, despite hostility including lawsuits.

=== 2018 ===
The 2018 John Maddox Prize was awarded to marine biologist Terry Hughes for his work documenting coral reef decline despite lawsuits and death threats. The early career John Maddox Prize was awarded to former naturopath Britt Hermes for promoting evidence-based medicine.

=== 2019 ===
In 2019, the John Maddox Prize was awarded to Bambang Hero Saharjo, a professor of forestry and forest fire forensics at Bogor Agricultural University, for sharing his research findings as an expert witness for at least 500 forest fire cases in Indonesia since 2000 despite facing harassment, intimidation and lawsuits. The early career prize was awarded to Olivier Bernard, a pharmacist from Quebec, Canada, who became the target of a smear campaign for challenging the use of high-dose vitamin C injections in cancer patients.

=== 2020 ===
In 2020 the John Maddox Prize was awarded to Anthony Fauci, then director of the National Institute of Allergy and Infectious Diseases (NIAID), and Salim S. Abdool Karim, director of the Centre for the AIDS Programme of Research in South Africa, for communicating the science of COVID-19. The 2020 early career prize was awarded to Anne Abbott, a neurologist from the Central Clinical School at Monash University in Melbourne, Australia, for her perseverance in challenging unnecessary procedural treatment of carotid stenosis, which can lead to strokes.

=== 2021 ===
The 2021 prize was awarded to Elisabeth Bik for "outstanding work exposing widespread threats to research integrity in scientific papers". Mohammad Sharif Razai, from St George's, University of London, was awarded the early career prize for his work "tackling racial health inequalities; from vaccine hesitancy among ethnic minority groups, to revealing systemic racism as a fundamental cause and driver of adverse health outcomes".

=== 2022 ===
In 2022, the John Maddox Prize was awarded to Eucharia Oluchi Nwaichi, a biochemist at the University of Port Harcourt, Nigeria, for engaging communities in conflict to research solutions to pollution in the oil fields of the Niger Delta.

=== 2023 ===
The 2023 prize was awarded to Canadian scientist Nancy Olivieri for "her communication of the importance of being open with patients about medical research". Olivieri lost her post at the Hospital for Sick Children in Toronto after raising concerns about the drug deferiprone during a clinical trial of its use. The early career prize went to American epidemiologist Chelsea Polis, a specialist in sexual and reproductive health issues, for challenging false claims in the marketing of a fertility tracking device, overcoming a lawsuit from the manufacturer.

=== 2024 ===
The 2024 prize was awarded to Patrick Ball for his work analyzing data on human rights violations. The early career award was given to Kelly Cobey for advocating reform of research assessment and for her critique of predatory journals. The judges gave a special commendation to Shiba Subedi for his work on earthquake awareness in Nepal.

=== 2025 ===
The 2025 prize was awarded to Virginia Burkett, a coastal wetlands ecologist and former chief scientist for climate and land use change at the United States Geological Survey, for defending evidence-based science in the National Climate Assessment report despite political opposition. Her work to improve the understanding of the impact of climate change on ecosystems was also recognized. The 2025 early career award was granted to geographer Nicolás Zanetta-Colombo for his work engaging communities living near Chilean copper mines and for documenting heavy-metal contamination in the surrounding environment. The judges highly commended Andrew Macintosh for his work exposing the misuse of a carbon credit scheme in Australia.

=== 2026 ===
The 2026 prize was awarded to Siddhartha Roy, an environmental scientist at Rutgers University, for his work on the Flint water crisis. In 2015, Roy served on the Flint Water Study team that identified high levels of lead in Flint's tap water, contradicting official assurances from the Michigan Department of Environmental Quality that the water was safe. In 2024, he and his colleagues raised concerns about a paper published in Science Advances that linked poorer educational outcomes among Flint's children to the lead contamination crisis and was reported by ProPublica and The Washington Post. Roy has argued that the poorer educational outcomes could instead be explained by a nocebo effect. The 2026 early career award was granted to Mónica Guzmán-Rojo, a civil hydraulic engineer at the Universidad Católica Boliviana, for demonstrating the effect of deforestation and fires on the groundwater that rural and Indigenous communities in Bolivia depend on. Her work drew opposition from powerful land interests and led to legal protections for the aquifers. The judges gave a special commendation to Samer Abuzerr, a public health specialist at the University College of Science and Technology Khan Yunis, for continuing his research in Gaza despite the destruction of his university, including work on the resurgence of polio among children that contributed to the 2025 humanitarian ceasefire.
