= Michael R. Reich =

- Born: May 29, 1950 (age 76); Akron, Ohio, U.S.
- Education: Yale University (B.A., M.A., Ph.D.)
- Awards: Order of the Rising Sun
- Scientific career
- Workplaces: Harvard T.H. Chan School of Public Health, Boston

Michael R. Reich is an American political scientist and the Taro Takemi Research Professor of International Health Policy at the Harvard T.H. Chan School of Public Health in Boston, Massachusetts. a specialist in the political analysis of health reform, pharmaceutical policy and access to medicines, and health policy in Japan and Mexico.

== Biography ==
Reich received three degrees from Yale University: B.A. in molecular biophysics and biochemistry in 1974, M.A. in East Asian Studies (Japan) in 1975, and Ph.D. in political science in 1981. He joined the faculty of the Harvard T.H. Chan School of Public Health in 1983, and became Director of the Takemi Program in 1988, a tenured Professor in International Health Policy in 1992, Chair of Department of Population and International Health from 1997 to 2001, and Director of the Harvard Center for Population and Development Studies from 2001 to 2005. He served as Taro Takemi Professor of International Health Policy from 1997 to 2016.

== Work ==
Reich has published on public health policy and political analysis, including access to medicines and pharmaceutical policy, health policy in Japan, and the political economy of health reform. He co-authored the first book in English on Japan's environmental problems, Island of Dreams: Environmental Crisis in Japan, in 1974. His next book was Six Lives/Six Deaths: Portraits from Modern Japan, written with Robert Jay Lifton and Shuichi Kato, and was published in Japanese in 1977 and in English in 1979. His 2004 book Getting Health Reform Right: A Guide to Improving Performance and Equity, co-authored with Marc J. Roberts, William C. Hsiao, and Peter Berman, has been used around the world to guide reform processes and teach policymakers how to manage health reform. In 2014, he became founding co-Editor-in-Chief of the new journal Health Systems & Reform.

Reich has also been engaged in public health in Mexico, including two terms as visiting professor at the National Institute of Public Health in Cuernavaca (2005-6 and 2015) and co-teaching (with Martin Lajous) over the past five years an intensive three-week Harvard field course in Mexico on the national health reform.

In his teaching, he has promoted case-based learning. He has written many teaching cases related to global health policy on topics ranging from passing health reform in West Africa to partnering for malaria control in Zambia, to adopting national pharmaceutical reform, to reproductive health policy in Guatemala.

A 2021 study published in Vaccine by researchers including Takahiro Kinoshita and Reich of Harvard Kennedy School analyzed the decline in public confidence surrounding the HPV vaccine in Japan. The authors attributed the drop in coverage to a combination of sensationalized media reports, delayed government response, and erosion of public trust. They emphasized that rebuilding vaccine confidence requires transparent communication and stronger engagement between health authorities and the public.

=== The Takemi Program in International Health ===
Reich established the Takemi Program in International Health in 1983, a novel mid-career research and advanced training program at the Harvard School of Public Health. The program was named after Dr. Taro Takemi. Since its establishment in 1983, the program has hosted over 290 mid-career researchers (Takemi Fellows) from 56 countries.

== Awards ==
- On April 29, 2015, the government of Japan announced in its Spring Honors List the award of the Order of the Rising Sun, Gold Rays with Neck Ribbon, to Professor Reich, for his outstanding contribution to the promotion of Japan's policy for global public health as well as for advancing public health in Japan.
- In November 2016, Reich received the Award for Lifetime Service to the Field of Health Policy and Systems Research from the Alliance for Health Policy and Systems Research and from Health Systems Global.
