= Riko Muranaka =

Japanese medical doctor and journalist

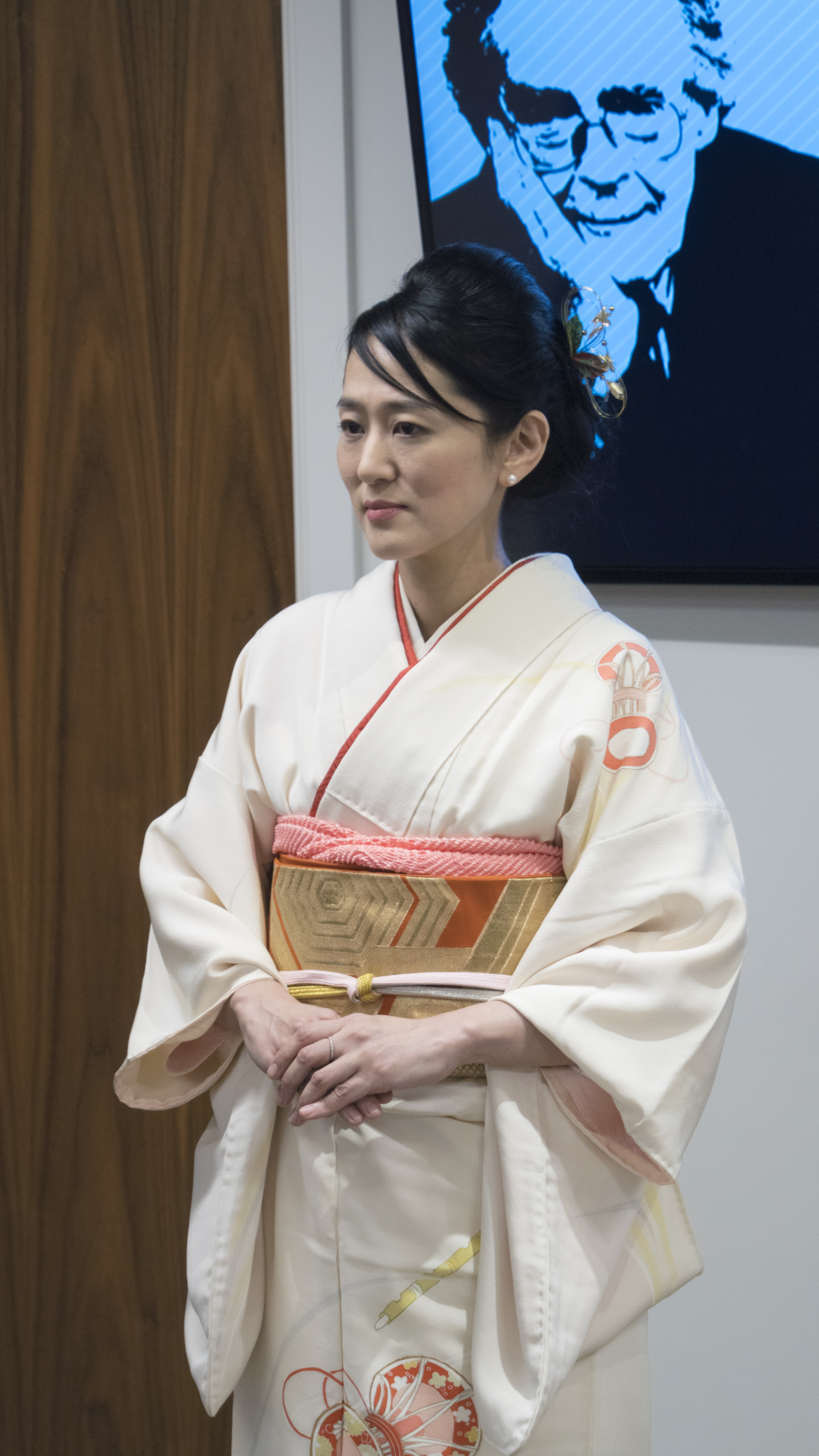
Muranaka at the 2017 John Maddox Prize delivery ceremony.

Riko Muranaka (村中 璃子, Muranaka Riko) is a medical doctor, journalist and recipient of the 2017 John Maddox Prize for fighting to reduce cervical cancer and countering misinformation about the human papilloma virus (HPV) vaccine dominating the Japanese media, despite facing safety threats. Despite the lack of evidence, the HPV vaccine is infamous in Japan due to misattributed adverse effects, with government suspending promotion and coverage. While the World Health Organization (WHO) safety and efficacy information about the vaccine is consistent with Muranaka's reporting, a court ruled against Muranaka in an unrelated slander lawsuit in 2016 for claims of alleged fabrication. Under threat of legal harassment by antivaccine activists, publishers declined some of her works including a book on the HPV vaccine (ultimately, Heibonsha accepted the book for publication).

== Biography ==
Muranaka received an M.A. in sociology from Hitotsubashi University and an M.D. from Hokkaido University School of Medicine. According to her own profile, she was known as a journalist writing about the Ebola fever in 2014. In February 2018, she published her first book.

Muranaka is part-time lecturer at the Japan Kyoto University School of Medicine. As of 2019, she lives in Germany.

== Lawsuit ==
In 2016, Muranaka wrote in the Wedge magazine about research done by Shinshu University neurologist Shuichi Ikeda, alleging that some experimental evidence for a link between an HPV vaccine and brain cancer in mice had been fabricated, resulting in a lawsuit against her for libel. While Japanese's Health Ministry stated that Ikeda's results "have not proven anything about whether the symptoms that occurred after HPV vaccination were caused by the HPV vaccine," the court ruled that evidence of fabrication was absent. The university investigation on Ikeda's work concluded that he did not commit scientific misconduct, but that conclusions may have been overstated, then released a statement, including that the research did not conclusively provide a link in relation to vaccine safety. Muranaka lost the libel case. Wedge magazine had to retract claims of fabrication from the article with both needing to pay for damages.

In support of Muranaka, Nobel laureate Tasuku Honjo submitted an expert opinion during the appeals process, criticizing the scientific basis of Ikeda's study and emphasizing the importance of reproducibility in biomedical research.

Muranaka intends to appeal, also stating that she needs to win the lawsuit for science and that the court case was still an opportunity to make friends and gain recognition despite its negative aspects. According to Heidi Larson, director of the Vaccine Confidence Project at the London School of Hygiene & Tropical Medicine, "I think what is important is that media coverage does not distort the point and imply Dr. Ikeda's science won: It was Dr. Muranaka's manners and language that lost".

== John Maddox Prize delivery ceremony ==
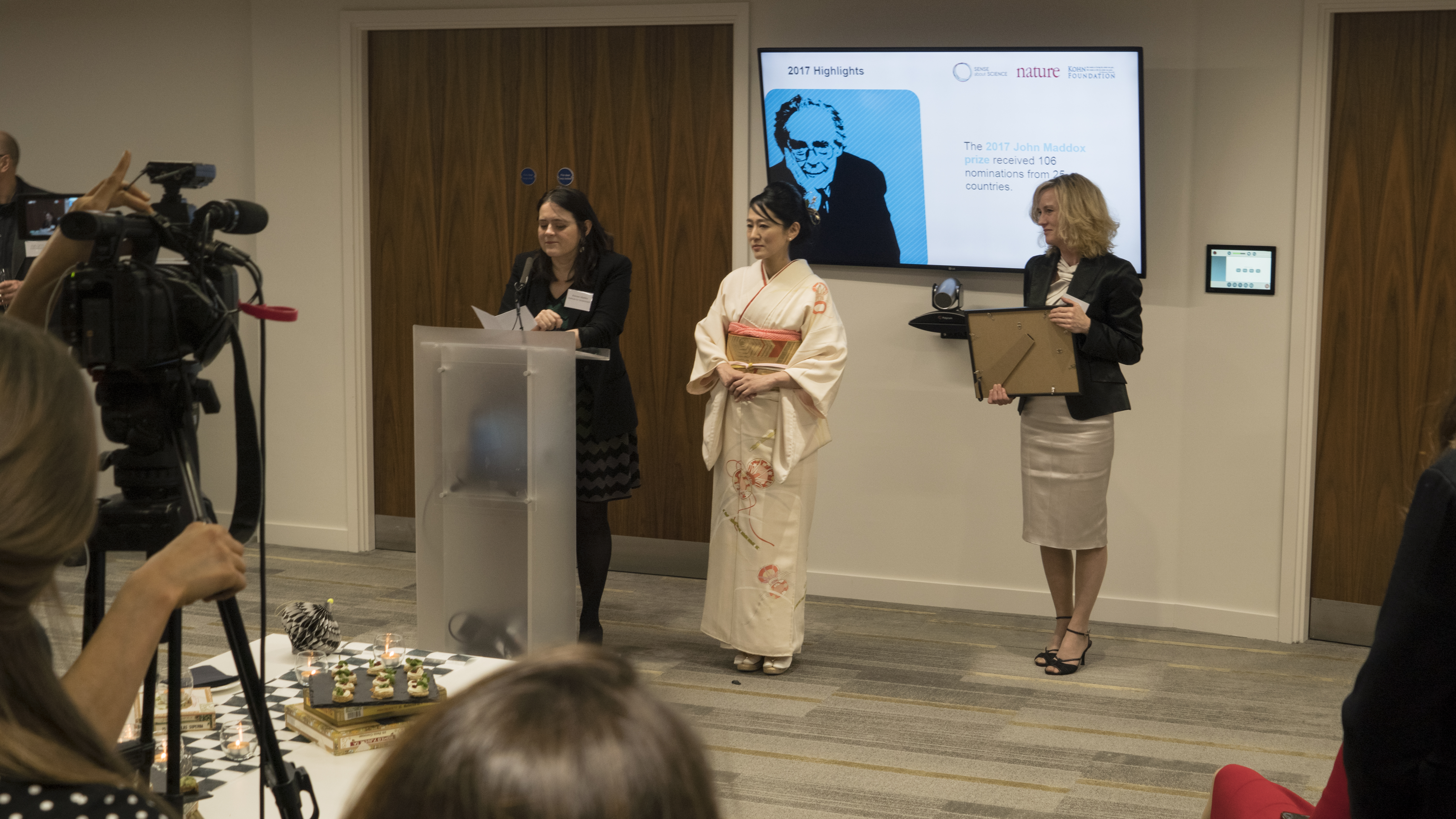
Ceremony held on November 30, 2017.

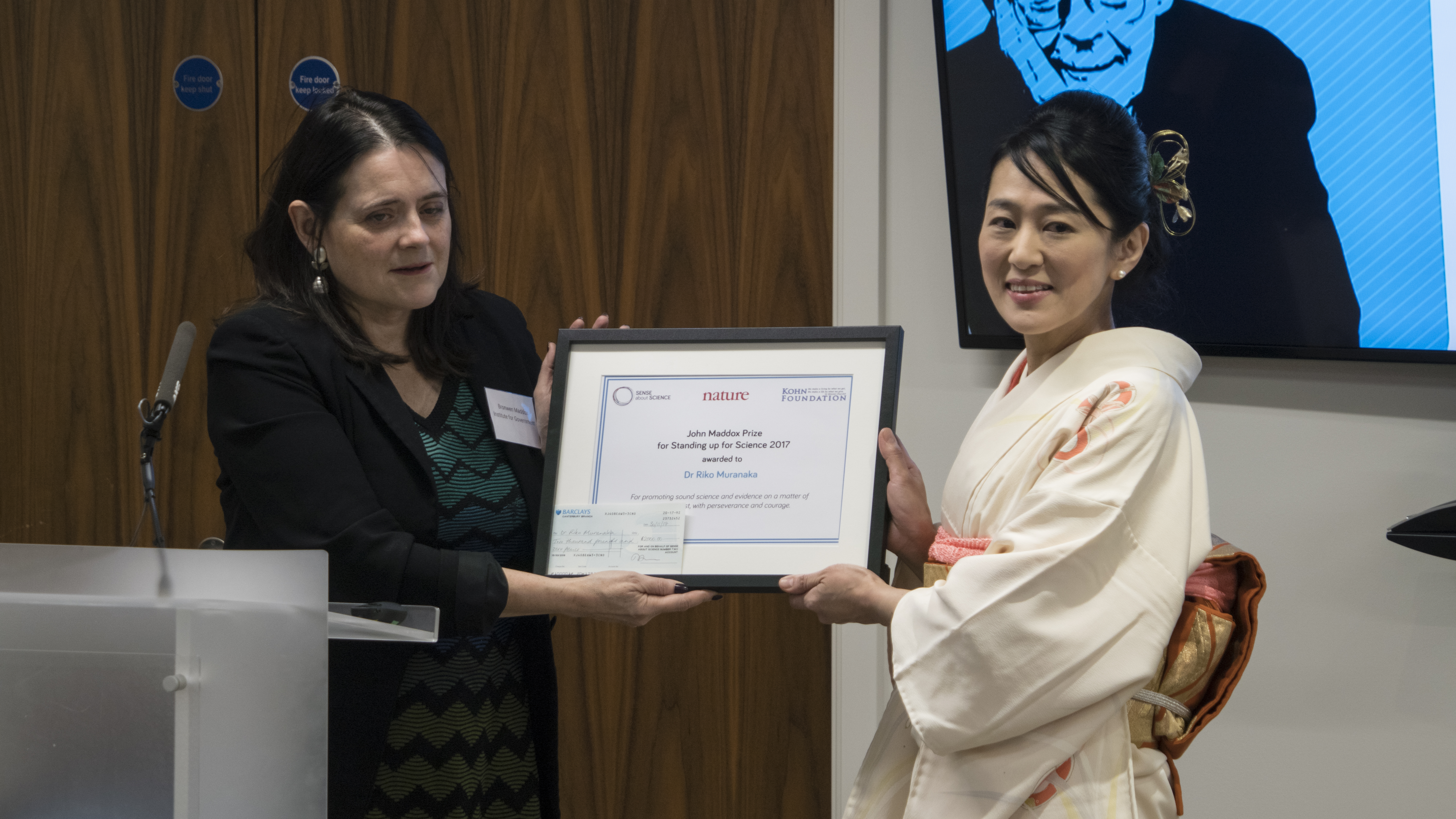

At the award ceremony of the John Maddox Prize, Riko Murunaka's speech highlighted the circumstances that, according to the award winner, could have given rise to the distinction received.

== Vaccination against human papillomavirus ==
The WHO has evaluated the effectiveness and safety of the vaccine against human papilloma virus (HPV) concluding that it is extremely safe and that it is not related to the adverse effects attributed to it.

At 2016, 79 out of almost 200 countries have HPV vaccine programs for girls and adolescents.

However, Japan stopped recommending vaccination despite the fact that its own technical committees found no relationship with the alleged adverse effects falsely attributed to this vaccine, and as a consequence, vaccination coverage fell to levels close to zero, not seen in any other country. In November 2021, the Ministry of Health, Labour, and Welfare of Japan finally resumed active recommendations of the HPV vaccine.

== Works ==
- Muranaka, Riko (2018). Jūmanko no Shikyū 10万個の子宮 [A Hundred Thousand Wombs] (in Japanese). Heibonsha.
