= New investigator =

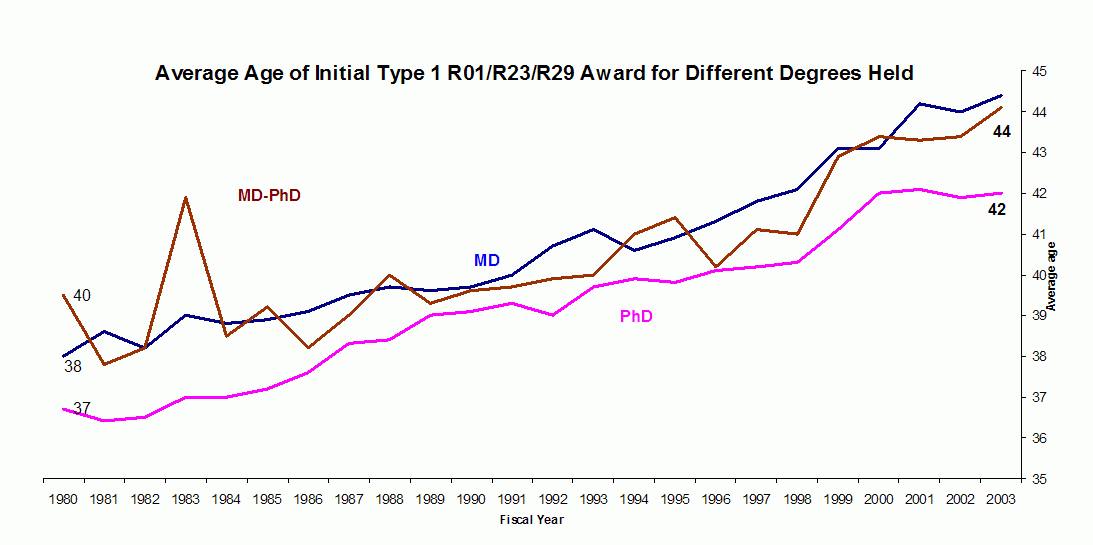
First major independent research support from NIH occurs at an ever-later age

Certain scholarly funding agencies make a distinction between investigators and new investigators. New investigators would be evaluated in a different way when competing for funding with more seasoned researchers, or they would be able to access funding resources specific to them. The rationale behind is to avoid the current trend that for certain grants the average age of the researchers receiving it for the first time keeps increasing over the years (See graph).

== Definition ==
The formal definition of a new investigator varies with the funding agency. For example, for the United States National Institutes of Health, a new investigator is one that does not have a story of previous funding. Other organizations, such as the Alzheimer's Association, consider a new investigator someone that is less than 10 years past their PhD degree. The Canadian Institutes of Health Research require a maximum of 60 months holding a full-time research appointment, and the Leukemia Research Foundation consider them to be within seven years of their first independent position. The Medical Research Council (UK) simply considers postdoctoral researchers in their first academic post.

The equivalent term Early Researcher (or Early Career Researcher) is also used in different ways, where for example, for the Australian Research Council it means someone that received a PhD or equivalent research doctorate within five years, or for the Ontario Ministry of Research and Innovation must be an independent researcher within the first five years of the start of their independent academic research career.

Many journals have recognized the essential contributions and achievements of early researchers and highlighted their profiles in different formats. For instance the Nature research group journal Communications Biology has launched a series for early career scientists, reporting some of the rising stars in all fields of biology throughout the year.
