= Nicorette =

Nicotine replacement therapy product brand

- Product type: Nicotine replacement therapy product
- Current owner: Kenvue (outside the US); Haleon (US only)
- Country: Sweden
- Introduced: 1978; 48 years ago
- Markets: Worldwide
- Previous owners: AB Leo; Pharmacia; Pharmacia & Upjohn; Smithkline Beecham; Pfizer; GSK; Johnson and Johnson
- Website: nicorette.com

Nicorette is the brand name of a number of products for nicotine replacement therapy (NRT) that contain nicotine polacrilex. Developed in the late 1970s in Sweden by AB Leo in the form of a chewing gum, Nicorette was the first nicotine replacement product on the market.

The product range encompasses chewing gum, lozenges, patches of two kinds (transparent and non-transparent), oral spray (Nicorette QuickMist), inhalator, sublingual tablets (Nicorette Microtab) and nasal spray.

Nicotine replacement products including gum and transdermal patches are on the World Health Organization's List of Essential Medicines. In April 2024, nicotine gum and patch products manufactured by Kenvue (marketed in many countries under the Nicorette brand) became the first nicotine replacement therapies to receive WHO prequalification, allowing their procurement through global health organizations and initiatives.

The brand name "Nicorette" comes from "nicotine" and Swedish: rette, "right way".

The brand is owned by Kenvue outside of the US, and Haleon in the US.

== Medical uses ==
Nicorette products are indicated for the relief of withdrawal symptoms associated with nicotine withdrawal and to aid in smoking cessation. It is suggested that Nicorette products should be used in "conjunction with a behavioural support programme". The World Health Organization released its first clinical treatment guideline for tobacco cessation in adults in 2024, recommending pharmacotherapy including nicotine replacement therapy alongside behavioral support.

Prior to 2005, nicotine products in Britain were only licensed to "assist smokers who were making an immediate and complete quit attempt". Following advice from a working group set up by the Committee on Safety of Medicines (since 2005, the Commission on Human Medicines) the Medicines and Healthcare products Regulatory Agency (MHRA) concluded that nicotine replacement therapy products should be used also by those who are unable to stop abruptly.

Nicorette products in the UK are indicated to:

- relieve craving (the urge to smoke),
- relieve withdrawal symptoms (irritability, impatience; difficulty in concentrating),
- improve the likelihood of a successful abrupt quit attempt,
- reduce the amount smoked in those not immediately motivated to quit.

The products are intended for adults and children over 12 years of age as well as pregnant and lactating women (it has been concluded that "the use of NRT in pregnancy does not give undue concern and any harm caused by nicotine replacement must be compared with that caused by continued smoking – which is extremely harmful to both the woman and her child".)

Nicorette, like all other nicotine replacement therapy products, are most beneficial for heavy smokers (more than 15 cigarettes per day). There are not enough studies to show that nicotine replacement therapy helps those who smoke fewer than 10 cigarettes per day.

== Contraindications ==
The typical contraindication (reason to not use) for Nicorette products is hypersensitivity to nicotine.

Cardiovascular disease was considered to be a contraindication to nicotine replacement therapy products. However, in 2003, the French Agency for the Safety of Health Products (AFSSAPS) removed all cardiovascular and cerebrovascular disease contraindications. In 2005, the UK Medicines and Healthcare products Regulatory Agency followed suit. The rationale is that the benefit of nicotine replacement therapy outweighs the risks of nicotine medication, even in smokers with cardiovascular disease.

In 2013, the US Food and Drug Administration (FDA) stated that the contraindication concerning usage of nicotine replacement therapy products while smoking is no longer valid.

The FDA approved labeling for Nicorette products with a warning concerning pregnancy and breastfeeding: "This medicine is believed to be safer than smoking. However, the risks to your child from this medicine are not fully known". The FDA suggests not using Nicorette products if the patient continues to smoke, or use chewing tobacco, snuff or other nicotine-containing products.

The FDA advises consulting a doctor before using the product if the patient previously had:

- heart disease, recent heart attack, or irregular heartbeat,
- high blood pressure,
- taken a prescription medicine for depression or asthma.

Specific contraindications listed by the FDA for various formats include sodium-restricted diet, stomach ulcer of diabetes (for gums and lozenges), or an allergy to adhesive tape or skin problems (for patches).

The FDA suggests stopping use of Nicorette products in cases of irregular heartbeat or palpitations, symptoms of nicotine overdose (nausea, vomiting, dizziness, weakness, and rapid heartbeat) or skin redness caused by the patch.

== Formats ==
=== Gum ===
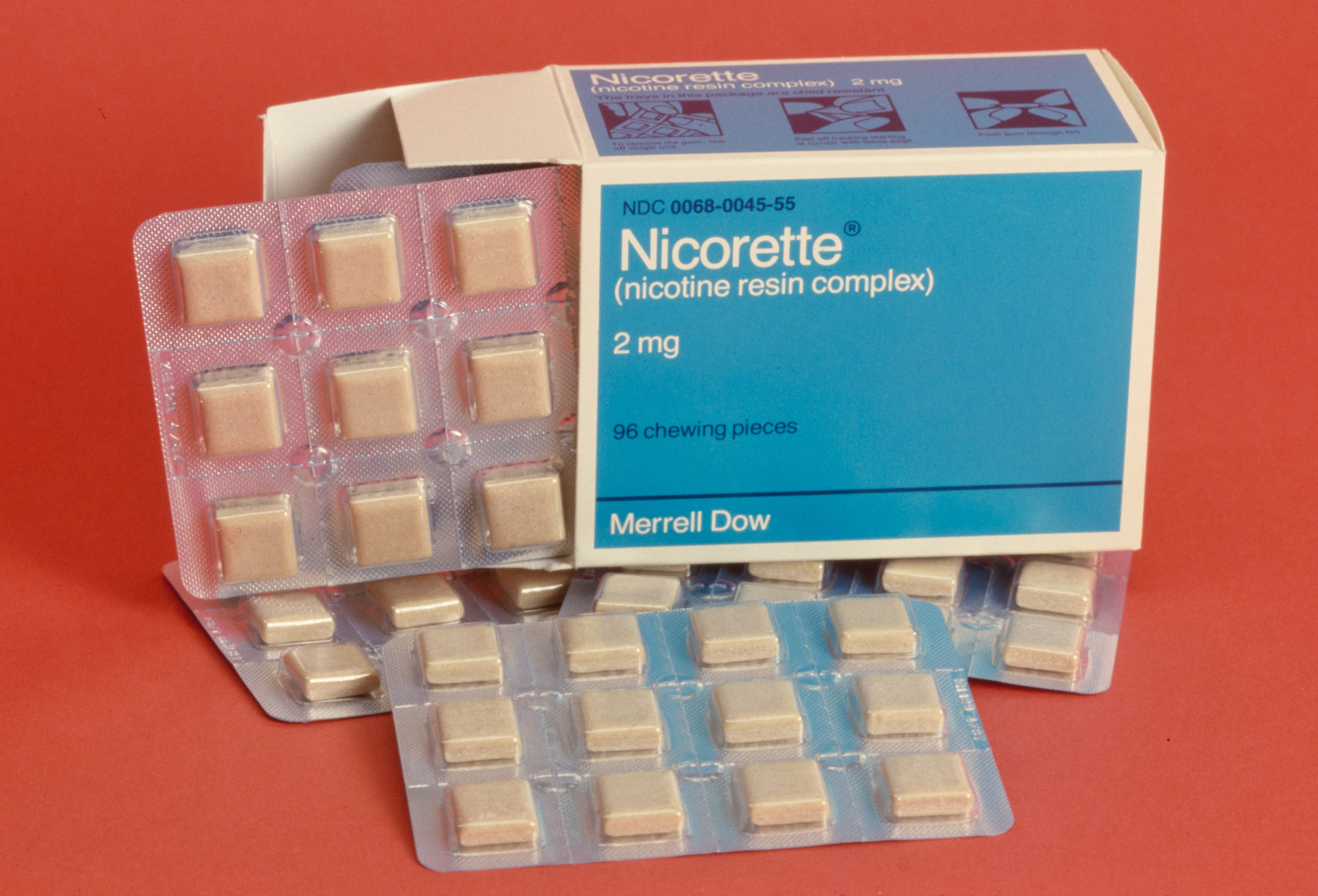
Nicorette chewing gum

Nicorette chewing gum releases nicotine while chewing. Nicotine then is absorbed across the oral mucosa into the systemic circulation. Patients are advised to chew the gum slowly and intermittently to avoid the risk of releasing too much nicotine. It is also suggested not to eat or drink while chewing since foods and beverages can reduce nicotine absorption.

Nicorette chewing gum is available in two strengths: 2 mg/piece and 4 mg/piece. Dosing would depend on the degree of nicotine dependence: light smokers should use 2 mg gum, heavy smokers (more than 25 cigarettes a day) should use 4 mg gum. Patients should chew gum once they feel the craving. FDA limits maximum daily amount of 2 mg gum pieces to 24 pieces.

=== Patch ===
The patches provide slow absorption of nicotine into blood within the day and work for 16 hours. They are usually applied in the morning and removed at bedtime.

The patch supports smoking cessation within 12 week programme: 25 mg patch (25 mg nicotine over 16 hours) for eight weeks (Step 1), 15 mg patch for two weeks (Step 2), 10 mg patch for the last two weeks (Step 3). Light smokers (less than 10 cigarettes per day) were recommended to start at Step 2 (15 mg) for eight weeks and reduce the dose to 10 mg for the last four weeks.

=== Microtab ===
Microtab supplies nicotine to the body by mouth. It is different from the chewing gum because instead of chewing the patient should allow the tablet to dissolve slowly under the tongue (the tablet dissolves in about 20-30 minutes). The action is similar to 2 mg nicotine gum.

Microtabs are used either for smoking cessation or smoking reduction. For smoking cessation the standard dose is one tablet (2 mg) per hour for patients who smoke less than 20 cigarettes per day. When the craving is strong two tablets can be taken instead of one. Most patients require between 8 and 24 tablets per day. British Medicines and Healthcare products Regulatory Agency recommends not to exceed 40 tablets per day limit. Treatment should be stopped when daily consumption is around 1-2 tablets per day.

=== Spray ===
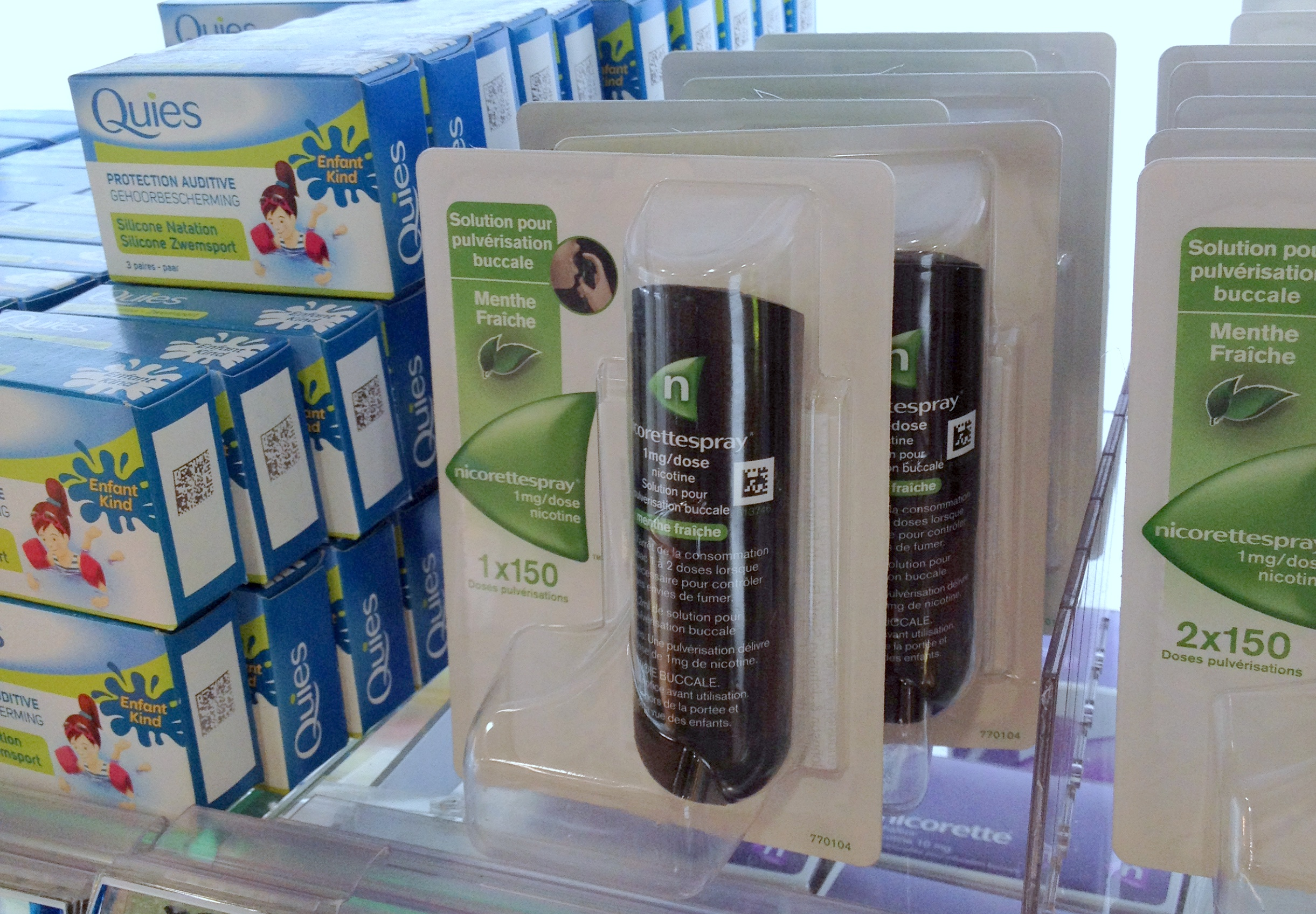
Nicorette spray at the pharmacy (France)

A spray of nicotine, Niorette QuickMist, is available. A 2024 placebo-controlled clinical trial in exclusive e-cigarette users showed that Nicorette QuickMist reduced urges to vape compared with placebo from 30 seconds up to at least 1–2 hours. It also found that participants who used the spray reported more adverse events than the placebo group. MHRA suggests not to use more than 2 sprays at a time, up to 4 sprays per hour and no more than 64 sprays per 24 hours period.

The product is able to connect to a smartphone app, that tracks doses and provides behavioral support for quitting smoking and vaping through Near-field communication (NFC) technology.

Other formats

In the UK Nicorette also sells an inhalator and nasal spray.

== History ==
=== Nicotine gum ===
The Nicorette brand started with a nicotine gum developed in Helsingborg (Sweden) by the company Leo AB, later part of Pharmacia & Upjohn. It was the first product for nicotine replacement therapy and gained its inventor, Ove Fernö, titles like "the founding father of modern pharmacotherapy for smoking".

In December 1967, Fernö, Vice President of Research and Development at AB Leo, received a mail from his friend Dr. Claes Lundgren at the Department of Aviation Medicine at the Physiological Institute of Lund University, suggesting he develop an orally consumed substitute for tobacco. He and his colleague Stefan Lichtneckert noted how submariners and aviation crews switched from cigarettes to chewing tobacco and snus when smoking was not possible. They also suggested the product name "Nicorette". Fernö began experimenting with nicotine gum in 1969, and quit smoking himself after one year of use.

The first nicotine chewing gum was produced at AB Leo in 1971. The innovation was in the use of ion-exchange resin (polacrilex) in order to control the rate of release of nicotine during chewing. Fernö explained, "Putting nicotine into chewing gum is not an invention. Fixing the nicotine to an ion exchange resin and putting that in a chewing gum to enable the chewer to control the rate of release—that is an invention". The same year Håkan Westling, Professor of Clinical Physiology at Lund University, started the first clinical trials of the gum as an aid to smoking cessation at the university hospital. His findings were presented at the Second World Conference on Smoking and Health in London and were published in 1973, in the journal Psychopharmacologia together with an article by Fernö.

Nicotine chewing gum was presented at the Third World Conference on Smoking and Health in New York in 1975, by Fernö in partnership with the British researcher Michael Russell from the Institute of Psychiatry, who pioneered the measurement of blood nicotine levels. Russell and his colleagues at the Addiction Research Unit at the Institute of Psychiatry became involved in further research into nicotine gum through randomised controlled trials funded by the British Medical Research Council and the UK Department of Health and Social Security.

Nicorette was registered as a drug in Switzerland in 1978, in Canada in 1979, and in the UK in 1980. It was registered in Sweden in 1981. Initially the Swedish Medical Products Agency declined to approve Nicorette as a medicine because it considered smoking not an addiction, but a lifestyle choice; and the Swedish National Board of Health and Welfare regarded orally consumed nicotine products not as medicine but as foodstuffs.

In January 1984, Nicorette chewing gum was approved by the US Food and Drug Administration after a 34-month review. It was brought to the US market by Marion Merrell Dow under licence from AB Leo.

In 2016, it was the third biggest selling branded over-the-counter medication sold in Great Britain, with sales of £66.0 million.

=== Further product ===
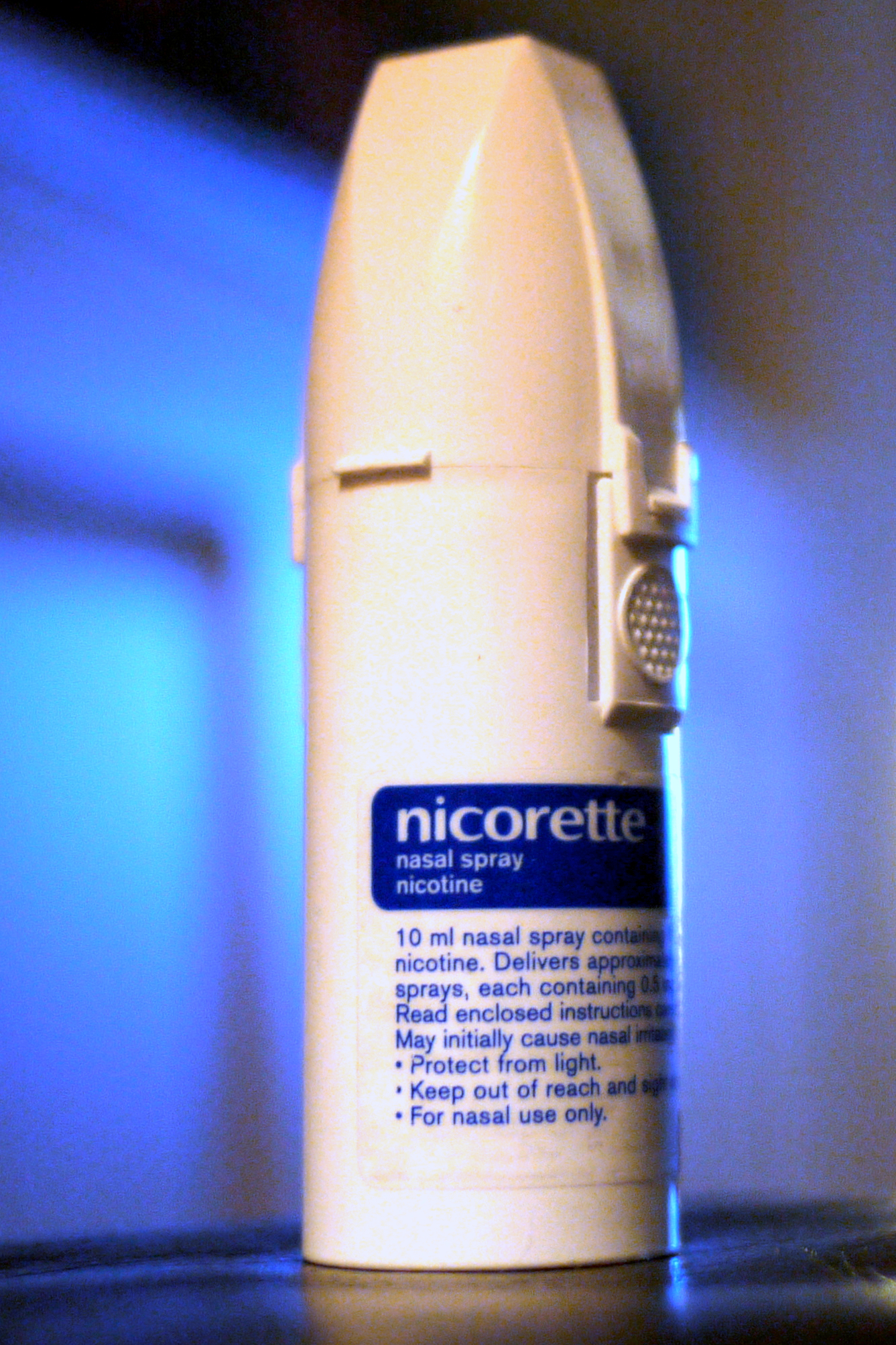
Nicorette Nasal spray

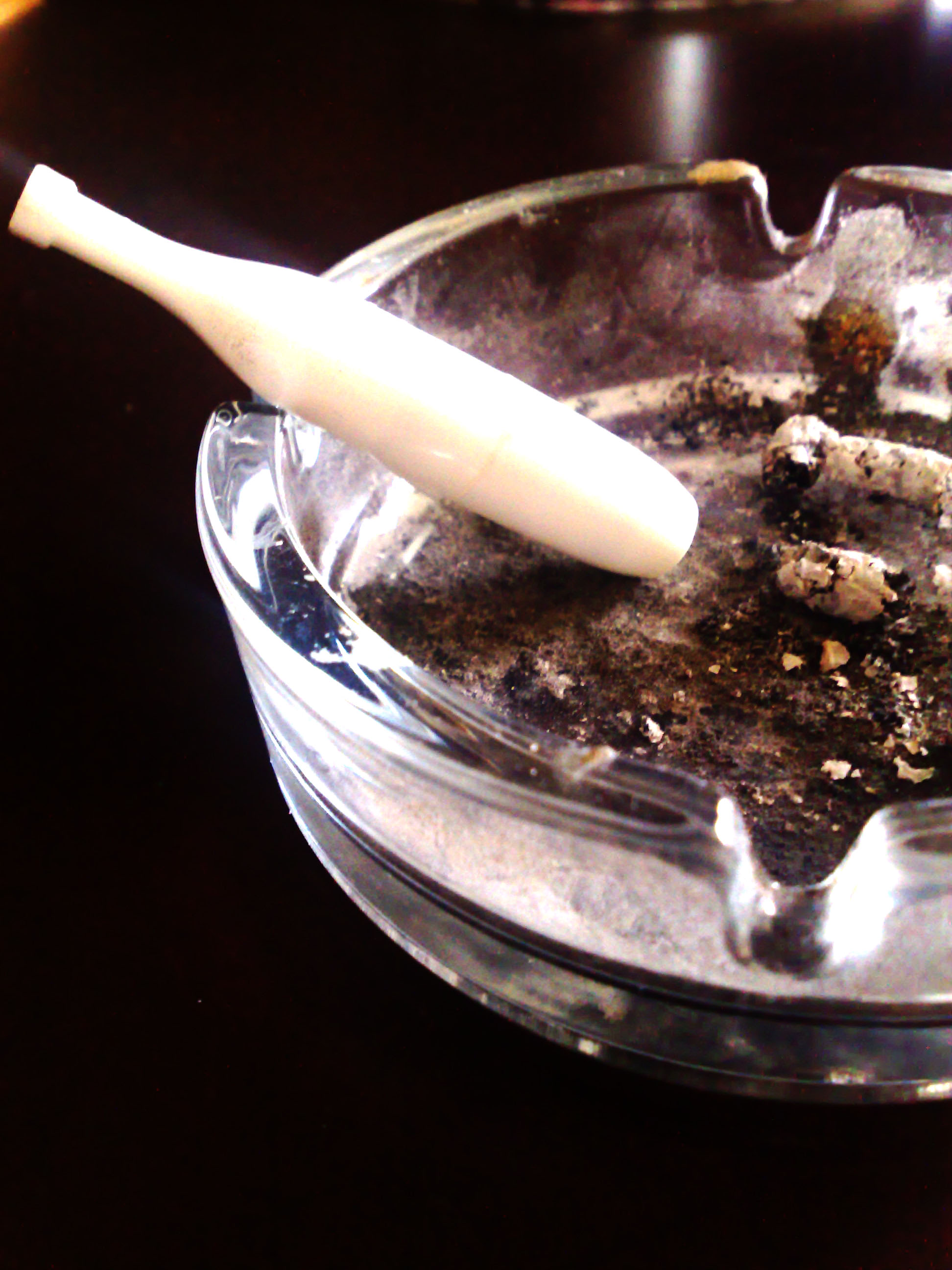
Nicorette inhaler

The Nicorette Patch was introduced to the market in 1991 and the nasal spray in 1994.

In 1996, the FDA approved the switch of Nicorette gum and the NicoDerm CQ transdermal nicotine patch to over-the-counter status in the US.

The Nicorette inhaler was launched in 1996 and Nicorette Microtab (sublingual tablets) in 1999.

In 2002, the FDA changed the status of Commit lozenges to over the counter in the US.

In 2004, Nicorette launched Peppermint, the first coated nicotine gum. A shell coating containing a sugar substitute (xylitol) and flavouring masks the nicotine taste. In 2005, Nicorette introduced Fresh Mint chewing gum.

In December 2008, Nicorette introduced a new semi-transparent nicotine patch under the trade name "Invisipatch". As stated by the UK Medicines and Healthcare products Regulatory Agency, in addition to this more discreet patch to encourage better customer compliance, new Nicorette transdermal patches have been developed to: reduce patch size; add a higher dosage strength of 25 mg of nicotine to the previously available 5, 10 and 15 mg; and increase the proportion of bioavailable nicotine).

In 2009, Nicorette introduced "Icy White" chewing gum with teeth whitening and Nicorette Mentolmint, a chewing gum with softer menthol taste.

At the end of November 2010, Nicorette introduced QuickMist 1 mg mouthspray, which provides more rapid absorption of nicotine than lozenges or gum. In 2025, Australia's Therapeutic Goods Administration (TGA) approved Nicorette QuickMist as the first registered medicine in Australia specifically indicated for nicotine vaping dependence.

In January 2011, Nicorette UK launched the ActiveStop mobile app for iOS featuring target setting, a wish list, distractions, achievement sharing, information and games.

In 2018, the brand released a new product, coated ice mint lozenges, shifting toward addressing e-cigarette dependence.

== Brand communication ==
=== Yacht race sponsorship ===
Nicorette has been sponsoring yacht racing since 1993 when it partnered with Ludde Ingvall, a Finnish-Australian sailor who started a non-smoking team in 1991.

The tobacco companies were ousted from land-based sports due to legislation that stopped them from promoting themselves in other sports… They all realized that yachting is in international waters, under a totally different legal framework, and they all started to sponsor yachts… I was absolutely furious when yachts (with names of tobacco companies) started arriving on the scene… I thought it was unfair that they were using my sport. It's a green sport, it's a healthy sport ... it is not a sport to be hijacked.

— in an article

In 1995, the Nicorette team was banned from the Cape to Rio Race, sponsored by the tobacco company Rothmans. The captain of "Nicorette" protested against the decision, saying that "Rothmans is scared of the boat and the healthy lifestyle it seeks to promote". A spokesperson for the organizing committee of the race later admitted that the yacht was barred because they considered the product to be in competition with the sponsor's product. In the same year the yacht won the Fastnet Race.

In 1997, the yacht broke the Transatlantic mono-hull record, covering the route from New York City to Lizard Point (Great Britain) in 11 days 13:22.58. Second and third generations of the yacht won the Sydney to Hobart Yacht Race in 2000 and 2004.

=== Car race sponsorship ===
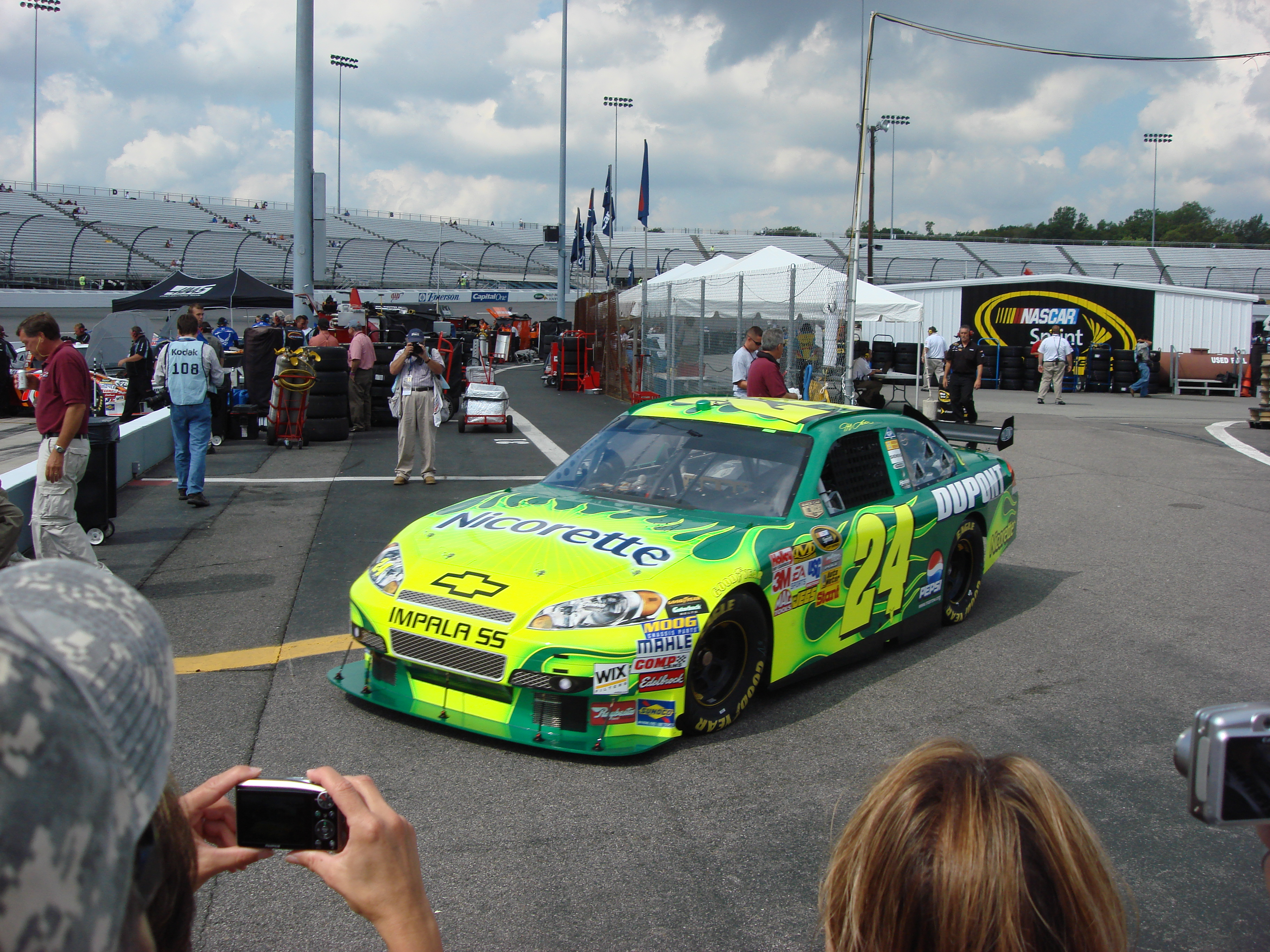
Jeff Gordon Nicorette DuPont race car

During the 90s Nicorette (GlaxoSmithKline) sponsored Dennis Vitolo (ex-smoker) in Payton Coyne Racing and The Grand Prix of Miami. In 2005, the brand entered NASCAR race sponsorship with Casey Mears. From 2006 to 2008, Nicorette sponsored Hendrick Motorsports with Jeff Gordon's car. During that same time period the NASCAR Nationwide Series race at Atlanta Motor Speedway carried the title Nicorette 300.

The brand also runs the Nicorette's Quit Crew program to help racers quit smoking.

It was reported that the brand supports car races because NASCAR fans are heavy smokers.

== See also ==
- Nicotine lozenges
- Nic Nac Naturals
- Nicotine pouches
- Nicotine replacement therapy
- Smoking cessation
- Zyn
