= Velo (nicotine pouches) =

Brand of nicotine pouches produced by British American Tobacco

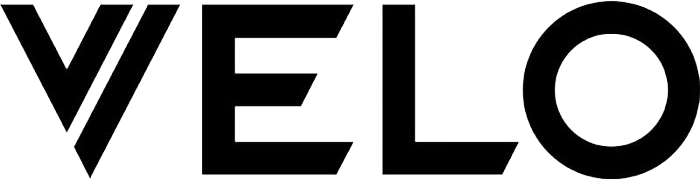
- Product type: Nicotine pouch
- Current owner: British American Tobacco
- Introduced: 2014; 12 years ago
- Related brands: Lyft
- Markets: Worldwide
- Website: Official Website

A can of Velo nicotine pouches

Velo (stylised as VELO) is a brand of tobacco-free nicotine pouches owned by British American Tobacco (BAT). In the United Kingdom, Velo products are distributed by Nicoventures Retail (UK) Ltd. Velo nicotine pouches contain nicotine but no tobacco leaf and are designed for oral use, being placed between the gum and lip.

Velo is sold in 49 international markets and is the flagship BAT brand in the modern oral tobacco-free category.

== History ==
BAT expanded its oral nicotine portfolio through several products and acquisitions before the introduction of Velo. In 2017, BAT acquired Swedish manufacturer Winnington AB, adding the Epok oral pouch brand, which is made using purified 'white tobacco', to its portfolio.

In late 2018, BAT introduced tobacco-free nicotine pouches under the Lyft brand in the United Kingdom and Sweden and under the Velo name in the United States. Epok, Lyft and Velo continued to be marketed alongside each other. In 2019, BAT announced the consolidation of its tobacco-free nicotine pouches portfolio under Velo, with the remaining Lyft products subsequently migrated to the Velo brand.

In its June 2025 trading update, BAT reported that Velo volume share had reached 14.3% of total oral and 29.7% of modern oral nicotine across its seven top markets: the United States, Sweden, Denmark, Norway, Switzerland, the United Kingdom and Poland. BAT stated that these seven markets represented approximately 90% of total industry modern oral revenue in 2024.

== Regulations and controversies ==
The product has drawn regulatory attention in several countries due to health-warning requirements and marketing practices. In 2024, reports in Business Daily Africa and The Guardian detailed how British American Tobacco lobbied health authorities in Kenya to soften nicotine-warning labels for Velo pouches. In Europe, several governments have implemented new restrictions on nicotine pouch sales, with France banning their sale in 2025 and explicitly citing brands such as Velo, Zyn, and On! in the legislation.

== See also ==
- Nicotine pouch
- Snus
- Nicotine lozenges
- Smoking cessation
- Nicotine replacement therapy
- Nic Nac Naturals
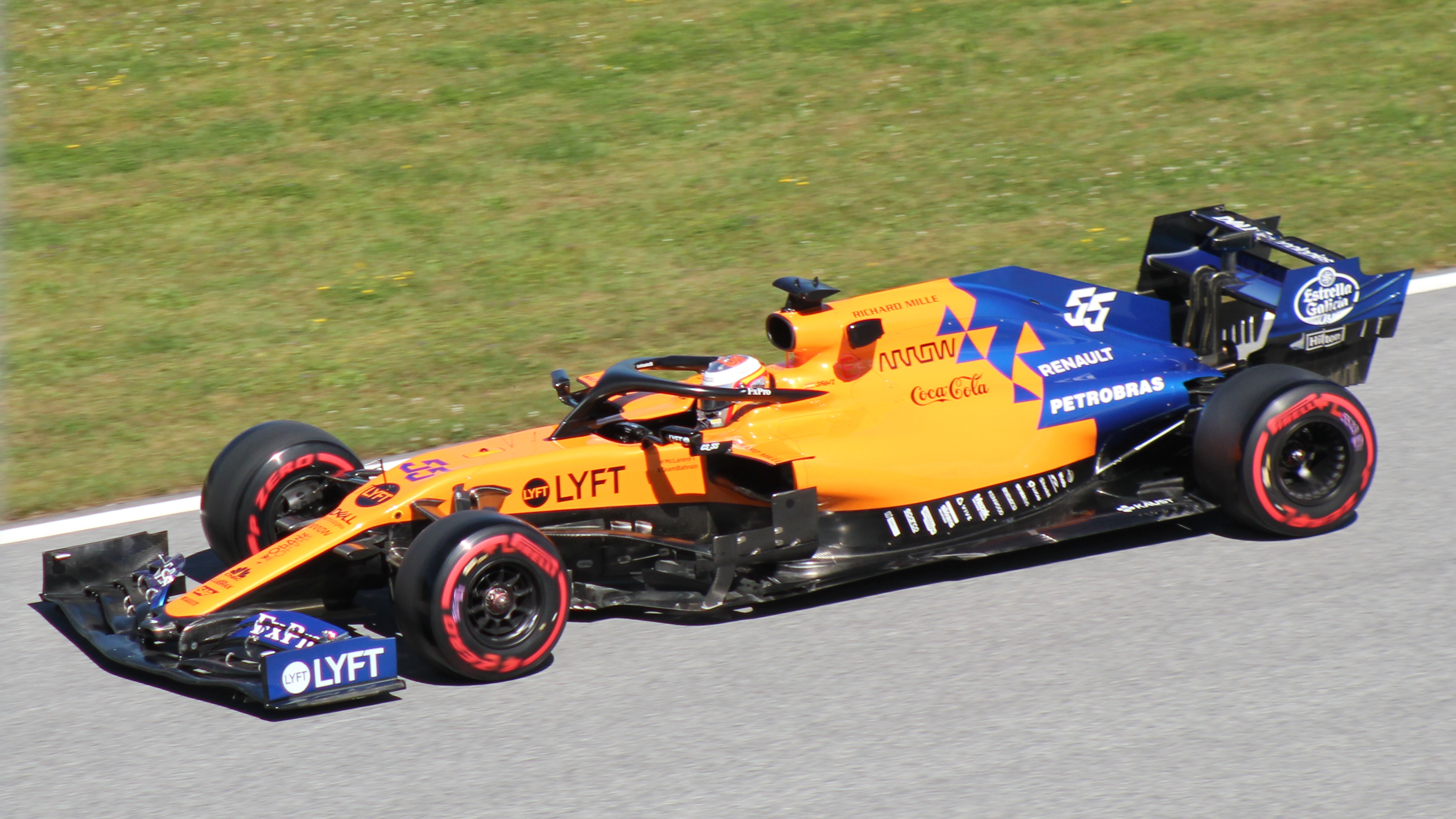

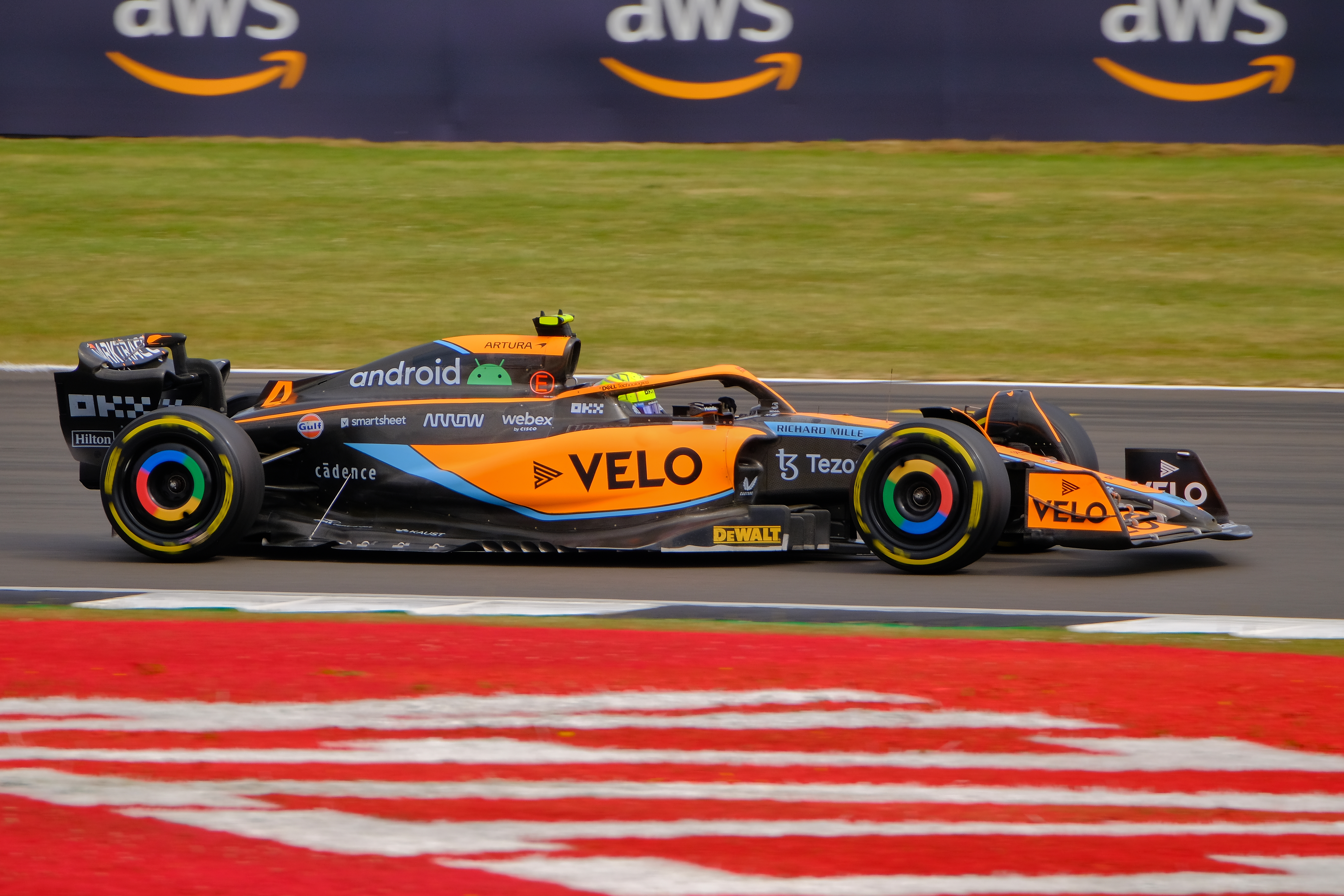
Lyft (top) and Velo (bottom) being advertised on the McLaren F1 Team cars though BAT's "A Better Tomorrow" sponsorship deal with McLaren.
