= Fagerström Test for Nicotine Dependence =

Medical tool

The Fagerström test for nicotine dependence is a standard instrument for assessing the intensity of addiction to nicotine. It evaluates the quantity of cigarette consumption, the compulsion to use, and dependence. In addition to this, the DSM-5 for tobacco use disorder can be used by physicians and nurse practitioners to make a diagnosis.

== Evaluation ==
Two of the questions are rated between zero to three including: How soon after you wake up do you smoke your first cigarette? and How many cigarettes per day do you smoke? The rest of the questions are answered "yes" or "no".

The higher the total Fagerström score, the more intense is the patient's physical dependence to nicotine. In many countries nurses and pharmacists can use Fagerström to assess nicotine use and may initiate Nicotine Replacement Therapy.

== See also ==
- Nicotine nasal spray
