= Nicotine vaccine =

Immunological strategy for treating nicotine addiction

Nicotine vaccine is a novel immunological strategy for treating nicotine addiction. Nicotine vaccine uses active immunization as the methodology to create polyclonal antibodies to the antigens, which is then used to treat drug abuse. The immune system is then able to identify nicotine as a foreign substance and initiate an immune reaction targeting the drug. As a result, the quantity of nicotine that enters the brain would decrease after receiving the vaccine. In preclinical studies, nicotine vaccines have demonstrated the ability to combat the negative effects of nicotine abuse, but none of the developed vaccines has been authorized for use in clinical trials as a smoking cessation strategy. Theoretically, the decrease of nicotine's rewarding effects should result in smoking cessation. Some companies have tested candidate vaccines in clinical trials, but evidence failed to show the adequate antibody responses or exhibit superior efficacy to factors concerning placebo.

== Addiction and withdrawal ==
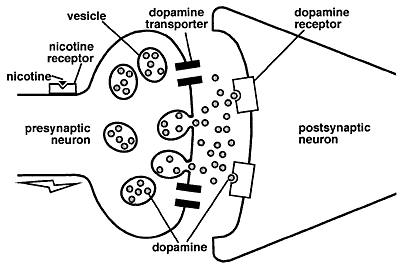
Nicotine increases dopamine release in a synapse

The aim of nicotine vaccines is to prevent smoking relapse. Past studies discovered that the region ventral tegmental area (VTA) in which the dopaminergic neurons are located, is where nicotine binds to and activates its nAChR receptor, resulting in the release of dopamine. Aside from dopamine release, there are additional neurotransmitters released, which include norepinephrine, acetylcholine, serotonin, γ-aminobutyric acid (GABA), glutamate, and endorphins.

Tobacco, the use of which is considered by the World Health Organization to be a global epidemic, contains the highly addictive substance nicotine. The increased dopamine level increases which results in drug dependence, in which smokers often face difficulties during the process of nicotine withdrawal.

The main neurotransmitter dopamine contributes strongly to the rewarding system experienced and reported by smokers, such as arousal, improved performance, pleasure and improved moods, which are all desired psychological states.

Nicotine withdrawal symptoms include anxiety, stress, irritability, depressed mood, difficulty concentrating, increased sense of hunger, increased eating, insomnia, and addiction to tobacco. Smokers that encounter these negative withdrawal symptoms choose to avoid such negative experiences and smoke tobacco again for the relief of nicotine withdrawal symptoms, resulting in relapse.

== Formulation ==
The constitution of nicotine vaccines involves the addition of adjuvants to the conjugation between synthetic drug-derived haptens which share structural similarities to nicotine, and the immunogenic carrier protein. Altogether, this formulation is known as a conjugate vaccine.

The linker is vital for linking the hapten to the carrier protein, providing the appropriate geometry for the binding of hapten to B cells. Linkers also ensure that the number of nicotine haptens available for binding to B cells is optimal. The carrier proteins used are all able to produce an immune response.

== Mechanism of action ==
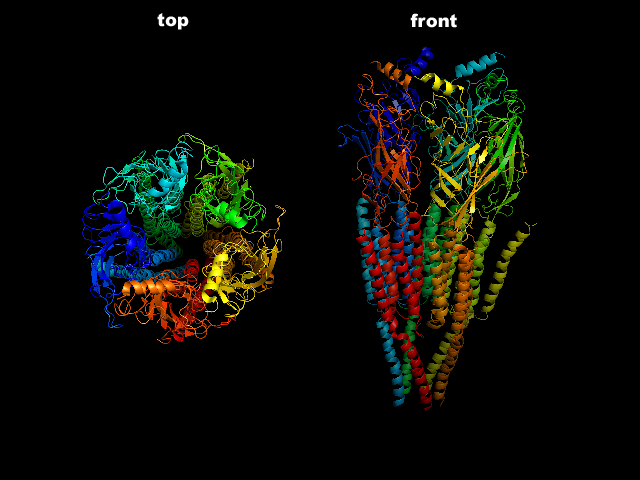
Nicotinic Acetylcholine receptor

Nicotine, an addictive natural substance present in tobacco, works as an agonist for the nicotinic acetylcholine receptor (nAChR). Pharmaceutical vaccine haptens attempt to imitate the structure of nicotine since the metabolites of nicotine (half-life of nicotine = 1–2 hours) are less physiologically active than the parent compound. Nicotine vaccines are immunogens made up of synthetic drug haptens connected to immunogenic carriers, which are then packaged in adjuvants to boost immunogenicity. The conjugate vaccine produces a strong immunogenic response from the body by stimulating the production of antibodies, which is administered through a vaccination.

A drug molecule with its structural composition altered and a chemical linker connected is referred to as a hapten. The immunogenic portion of the vaccine is linked to the hapten by a conjugated protein/macromolecular carrier. The entire configuration is called a hapten-conjugated protein/macromolecular carrier. Adjuvants are substances with aluminum content that strengthen immunity by improving the immune reaction to the antigen. Vaccine adjuvants are frequently used to curb drug abuse.

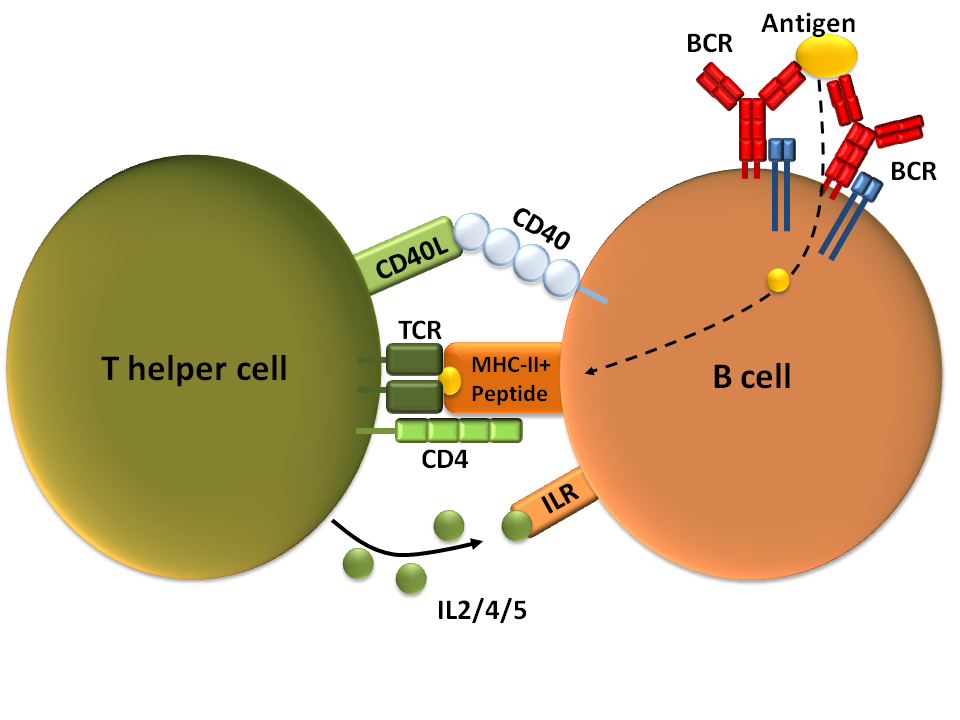
T-dependent B cell activation

Conjugated immunogens are injected to deliver the vaccine, which activates B and T cells in a T cell-dependent manner to create polyclonal anti-nicotine antibodies. The conjugated vaccine is exposed to lymphocytes by antigen-presenting cells. There is recognition of the peptide antigen by T-cell receptors. With the involvement of cytokines and B cells, a humoral response is elicited, which result in the synthesis of antibodies. Plasmatic cells produce immunoglobulins, the anti-nicotine antibodies that bind to nicotine. The nicotine and nicotine-specific antibodies are bound together, forming a complex. The complex prevents nicotine from passing through the blood-brain barrier, consequently inhibiting it from reaching the brain's nAChRs.

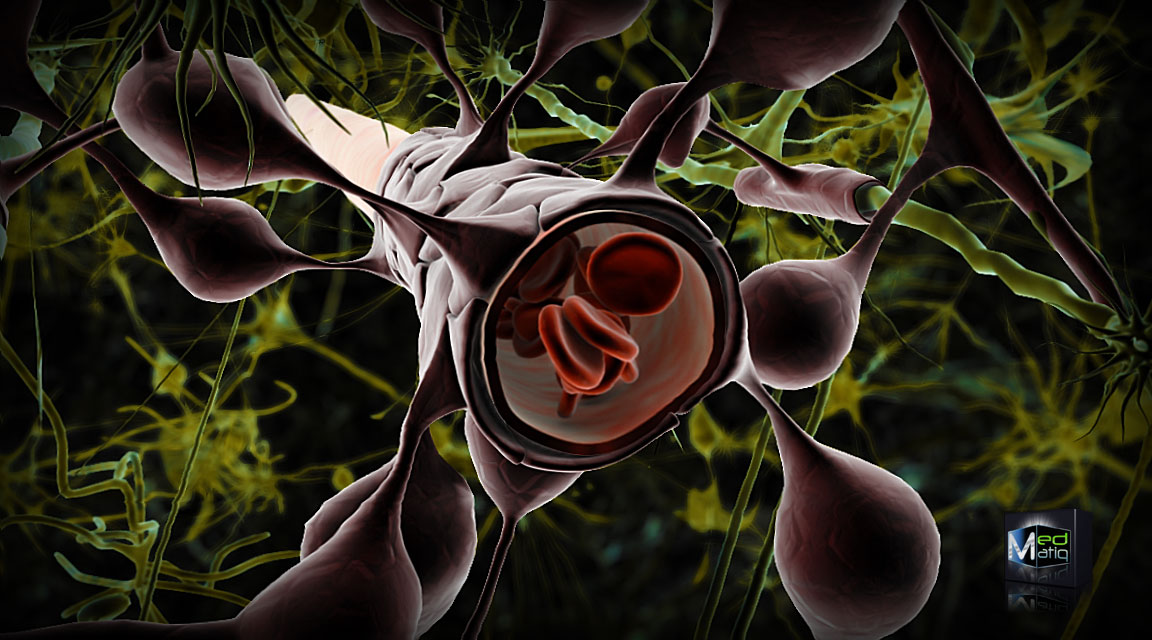
Blood Brain Barrier

The explanation for this is that when anti-nicotine antibodies bind to the nicotine molecules there is an increase in the overall molecular size. This blocks it from passing through the blood-brain barrier, and so nicotine is unable to generate the multiple neurotransmitters to exhibit its CNS effects.This prevents the synthesis of adrenaline and dopamine, which are the associated rewarding CNS effects that cause addiction, thereby inhibiting the pharmacological effects of nicotine.

== Alternatives for smoking cessation ==
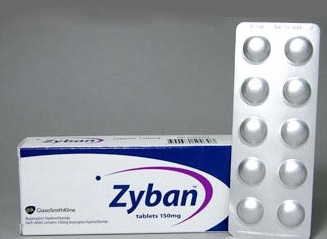
Bupropion

Only nicotine replacement (patches or gum), the antidepressant bupropion, and the nicotinic receptor agonist varenicline are approved to help tobacco users reduce their smoking while managing their addiction. However, less than one-third of the treatment receivers had quit, and only one-third of them succeeded in quitting for more than six months. Furthermore, more than half of those who received smoking cessation medication returned. New strategies are required to solve this significant health issue in the midst of these obstacles in order to promote smoking cessation.

Immunotherapy-based methods, such as the use of vaccines to treat addiction, have been documented in the literature since the 1960s and 1970s. A number of researchers re-evaluated the immunizations as side effects linked to licensed nicotine replacement therapy use have arisen. Due to their capacity to generate high-affinity anti-drug IgG antibodies, conjugate vaccines show potential as an alternative method of treating drug use disorders.

The list of nicotine vaccines that have been developed and included in trials include Nic-QB (NIC002), NicVax, Niccine and TA-NIC.

=== Developmental challenges ===
Despite substantial efforts that have been exerted to methodically examine the efficacy of nicotine-based haptens with various lengths, polarities, and flexibility, obtaining adequately high and stable immunogenicity over extended periods of time is a major challenge.

Although the use of nicotine vaccines may produce high levels of anti-nicotine antibodies to bind to all nicotine molecules and reduce the nicotine's effects on the brain by inhibiting its distribution, the dissociation rate constant (Kd) will determine whether there is a possibility of reversing the binding.

== Dosage ==
A total of three priming injections spaced 2–4 weeks apart are typically used in the conjugate vaccination regimen. The function of antibodies is dependent on two factors. The first factor is "titer", which refers to the number of antibodies present, and the second factor is the "affinity" of the anti-nicotine antibody to the nicotine.

Peak titer levels are reached between 2–4 weeks after a single injection and then begin to drop until a booster injection is given for the maintenance of nicotine antibody levels, due to the degradation of antibodies. The vaccine boosters are appropriate to use, usually 2–3 months after the last priming injection. Although infectious disease vaccines can be useful for many years without injecting boosters, drug vaccines are likely to require shorter booster intervals of one year or less.

=== Rationale for booster ===
The small size of nicotine molecule makes up its relatively low molecular weight, and an individual's immune system is unable to respond with an immune response. Thus the methodology and practice behind nicotine vaccines are through repeated vaccine administration in order to maintain the vital serum levels of nicotine antibodies. This rationale is from the consideration of therapeutic antibody degradation.

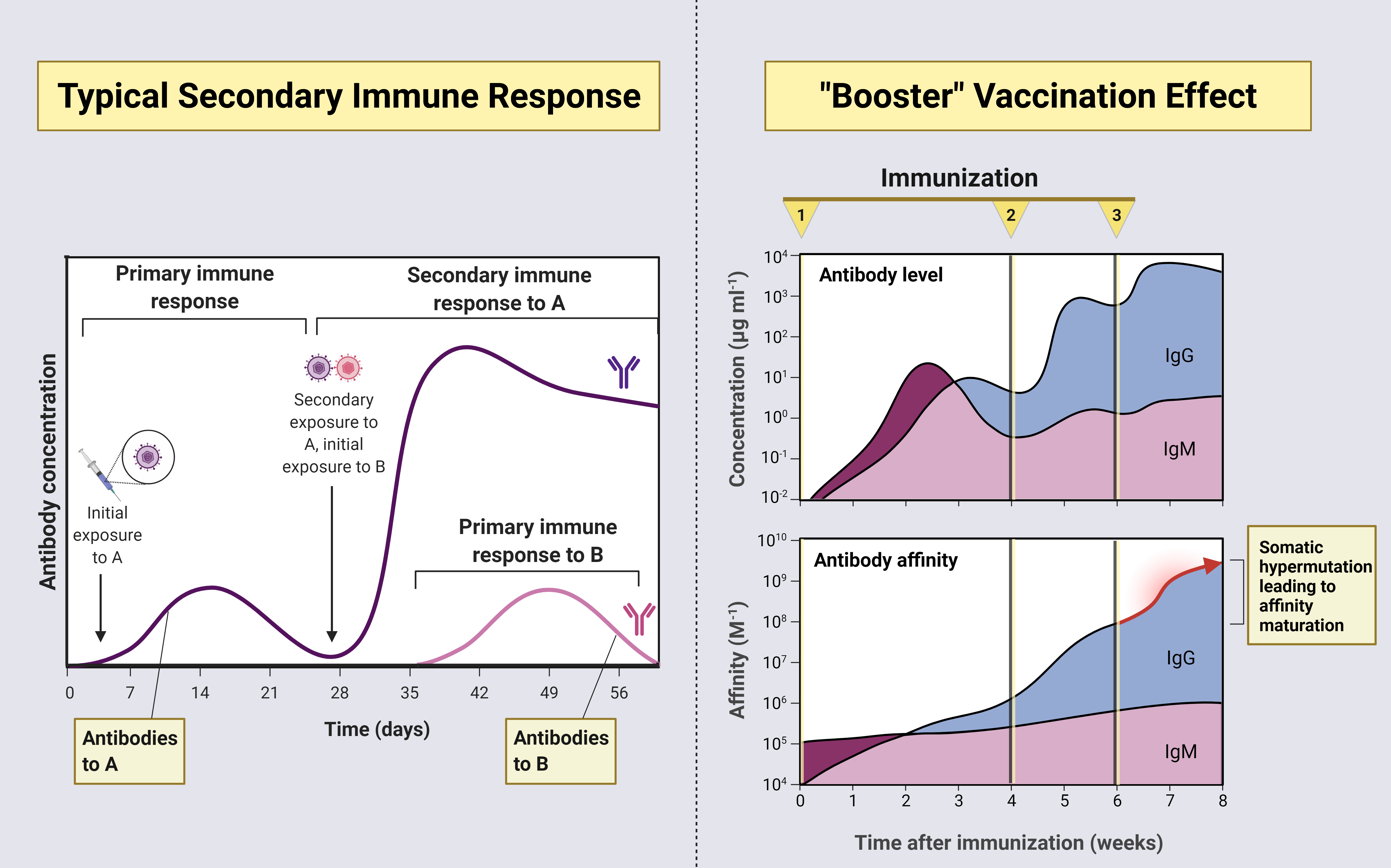
Secondary Immune Response

The purpose of the use of a booster is different from the mechanism of the first vaccination of the nicotine-conjugate vaccine. The first vaccination marks the immune system's initial contact with the antigen, which is how immunological memory functions. The booster vaccines are for the production of antibodies which utilize the immune system's memory regarding the encounter with antigens. This methodology will allow booster vaccines to generate a more rapid and efficient response to the antigen.

== Adverse effects ==
Clinical studies with cocaine and nicotine, which commonly used doses of 200 or 400 micrograms per dose, have shown convincing evidence that doses of immunobinding agents, even up to 2 mg per dose, are positively correlated with titer levels. Since there was no ceiling effect, these findings imply that the optimal dose was the highest dose of the vaccine that can be administered without causing adverse reactions. So far, no clinical conjugate vaccine studies have found any major adverse reactions to drug or vaccine conjugates.

== Pros and cons ==
The preferred technique for treating drug use disorders is active immunization because it is relatively safe and convenient in that the effect lasts even after several doses of the vaccine. Compared to small molecule medications, vaccines have a much-extended duration of action because they generate IgG antibodies with a longer half-life.

Conjugated vaccines act as immune antagonists that hinder the efficacy of the target substances. The anti-drug antibodies do not affect drug receptors in the brain or periphery, and therefore, the side effects are negligible.

One additional advantage of conjugate vaccines is that they are universal and can be created to target any single drug or drug combinations in theory.

Despite having long-lasting impacts, the vaccination strategy's antibody response is comparatively slow.

The effectiveness of the active vaccination method in changing behavior has not been established. They do not lessen withdrawal signs or drug cravings.

== Efficacy ==
=== Animal trials ===
To produce antibodies to measure nicotine amounts in human blood and urine, a trans-3′-succinimidylmethyl nicotine conjugate was coupled to KLH and administered to rabbits. Soon after, a 6-(p-aminobenzamide) nicotine conjugate-based BSA-conjugated vaccine was created, and it was once more shown to induce an animal model to generate an antibody response against nicotine. The produced antibodies were found to have a high affinity for nicotine at various binding locations, which strongly supported their use. After receiving a vaccination with a conjugate vaccine made of a 6-(carboxymethylurea)-()-nicotine conjugate conjugated with KLH, rats developed antibodies that significantly bound nicotine in the plasma but had no impact on nicotine levels in the brain, limiting the vaccine's potential efficacy. Animal studies have been more successful when using more contemporary methods. The nicotine levels in the rat brain and the rat's motor activity in reaction to a nicotine challenge were lowered by a vaccine using a non-nicotine conjugate linked to KLH via a novel linker protein (dubbed NIC).

In non-human primates, a second-generation nicotine combination called NIC7 demonstrated potential in producing anti-nicotine antibodies, which may lower the drug's concentration in the brain. It has been demonstrated that a completely synthetic nicotine vaccine (SEL-068) that contains an unidentified hapten prevents nicotine discrimination in non-human primates.

=== Human clinical trials ===
The results of several vaccine candidates that have reached human trials have, generally speaking, been discouraging.

In a Phase I trial involving 68 smokers, the 3′-AmNic-rEPA vaccine, also known as "NicVax," a 3'-aminomethyl nicotine conjugate conjugated to Pseudomonas aeruginosa exoprotein A, demonstrated a positive response. Higher doses resulted in higher levels of abstinence, and the medication had a favorable safety profile. Positive findings from phase II trials showed strong antibody outcomes and higher quit percentages in the treatment group in comparison to the placebo group. The vaccine was advanced to a phase III trial, but it was unable to achieve its endpoints as a single intervention or in combination with varenicline and counseling.

In trials, the Niccine tetanus toxoid conjugate vaccine, which had an acceptable safety profile, demonstrated a comparable impact without altering smokers' habits. NIC-002 contained nicotine conjugated to virus-like particles, also failed to achieve major clinical endpoints in the trial. It showed a marginally higher rate of smoking cessation at the two months but no change at the six months. TA-NIC was withdrawn since it failed to reach its clinical endpoints.

Despite many clinical trials, there is still a lack of evidence that supports vaccines as the effective solution to preventing drug abuse. Low antibody responses, short-lived antibody responses, individual differences in antibody responses, and continued substance use in the presence of an antibody response contribute to the undesired efficacy.
