= Nicotine replacement therapy =

Treatment for tobacco use disorder

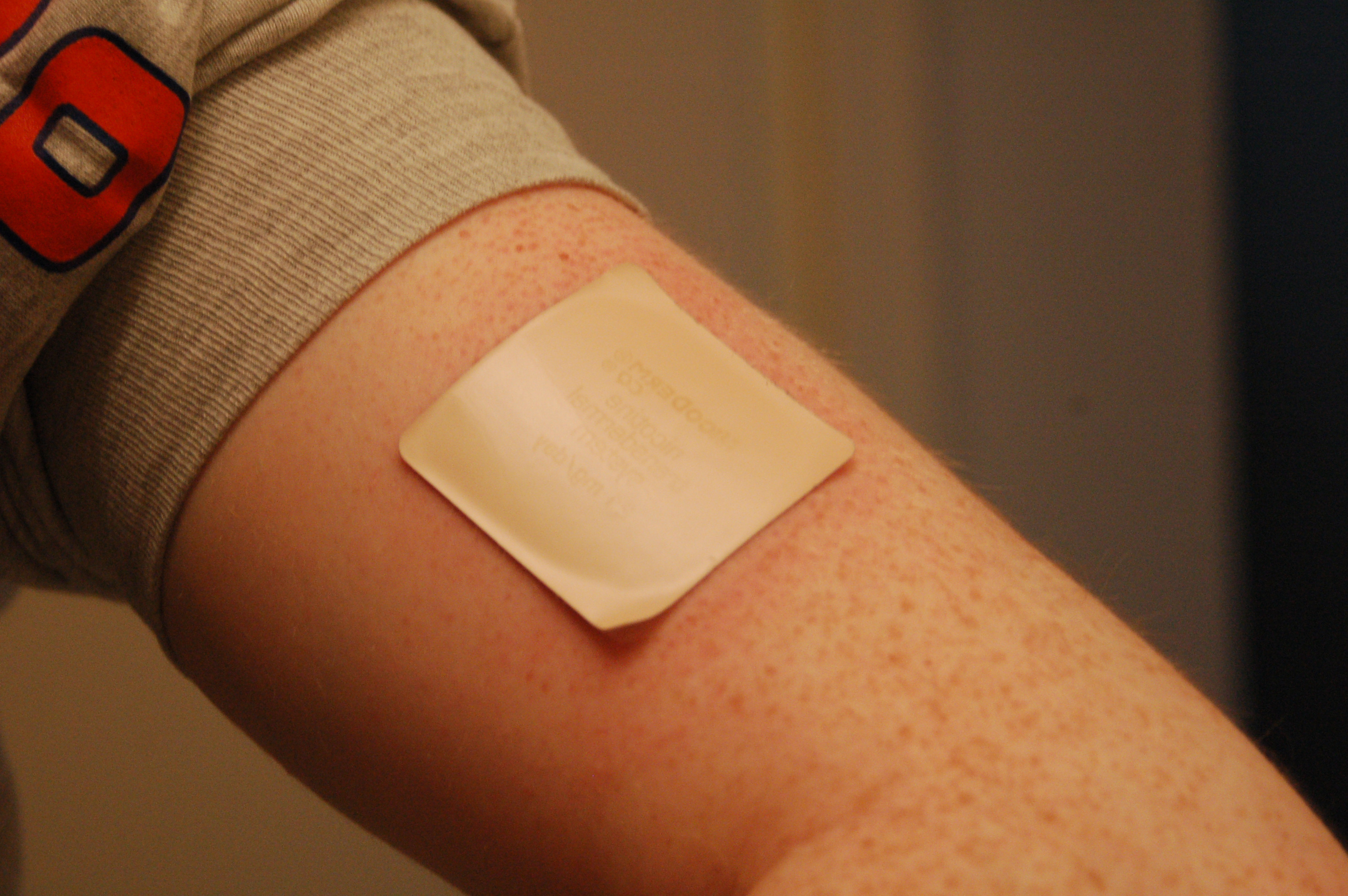
- A nicotine patch is applied to the left arm.

Clinical data
- Trade names: Nicoderm, Commit, Nicorette, others
- Other names: NRT
- AHFS/Drugs.com: Monograph
- MedlinePlus: a601084
- License data: US DailyMed: Nicotine
- Routes of administration: Oral, Inhalation, Transdermal
- ATC code: N07BA01 (WHO)

Legal status
- Legal status: US: OTC

Pharmacokinetic data
- Metabolites: Cotinine
- Excretion: Kidney

Identifiers
- IUPAC name: (S)-3-[1-Methylpyrrolidin-2-yl]pyridine
- CAS Number: 54-11-5
- PubChem CID: 89594
- ChemSpider: 80863
- UNII: 6M3C89ZY6R

Chemical and physical data
- Formula: C_{10}H_{14}N_{2}
- Molar mass: 162.236 g·mol^{−1}

Nicotine replacement therapy (NRT) is a medically approved way to treat people with tobacco use disorder by taking nicotine through means other than tobacco. It is used to help with quitting smoking or stopping chewing tobacco. It increases the chance of quitting tobacco smoking by about 55%. Often it is used along with other behavioral techniques. NRT has also been used to treat ulcerative colitis. Types of NRT include the adhesive patch, chewing gum, lozenges, nose spray, and inhaler. The use of multiple types of NRT at a time may increase effectiveness.

Common side effects depend on the formulation of nicotine. Common side effects with the gum include nausea, hiccups, and irritation of the mouth. Common side effects with the patch include skin irritation and a dry mouth while the inhaler commonly results in a cough, runny nose, or headaches. Serious risks include nicotine poisoning and continued addiction. They do not appear to increase the risk of heart attacks. There are possible harms to the baby if used during pregnancy. Nicotine replacement therapy works by reducing cravings caused by nicotine addiction.

They were first approved for use in 1984, in the United States. Nicotine replacement products are on the World Health Organization's List of Essential Medicines. They are available as generic medications.

== Medical uses ==
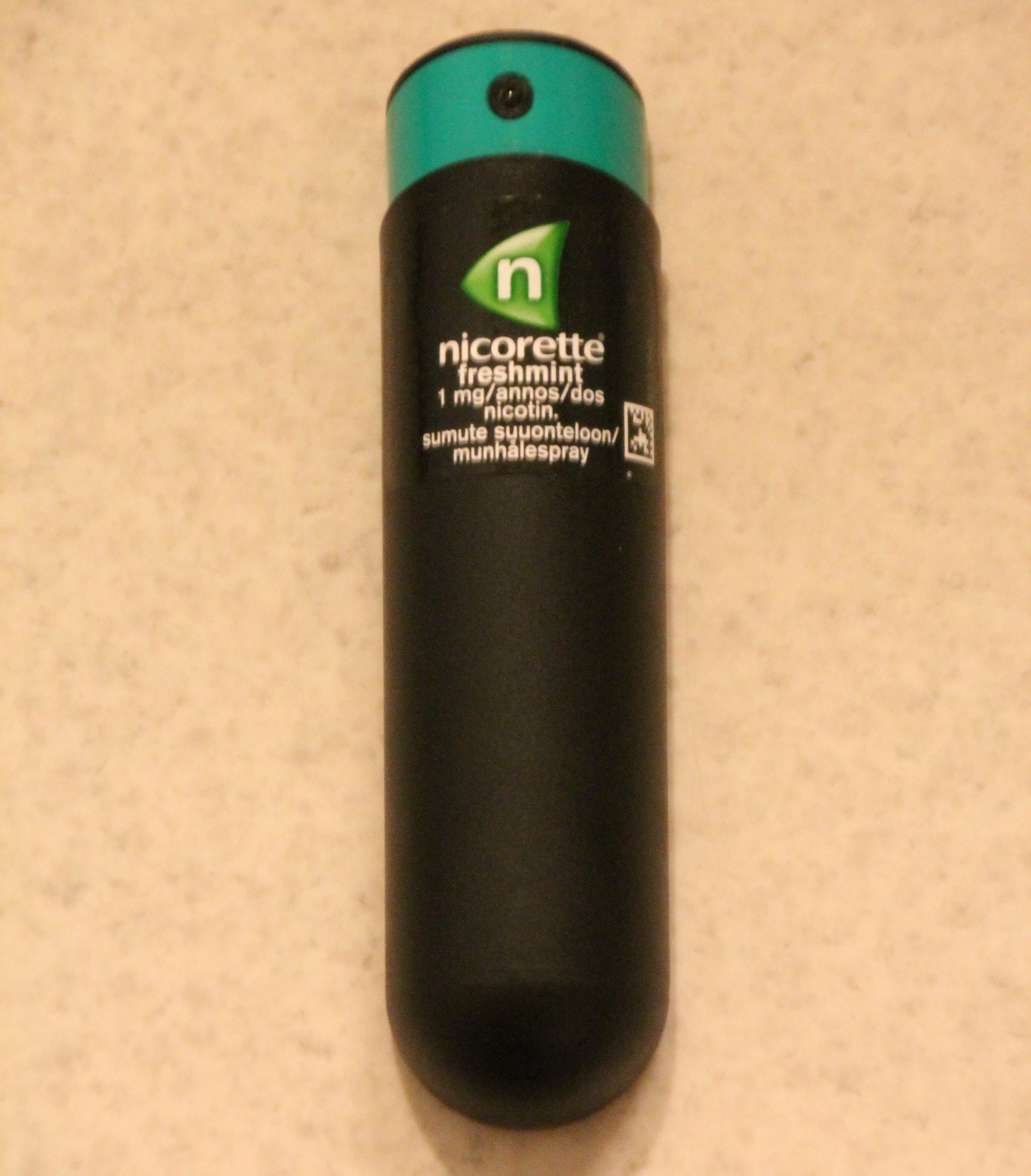
An oral nicotine spray

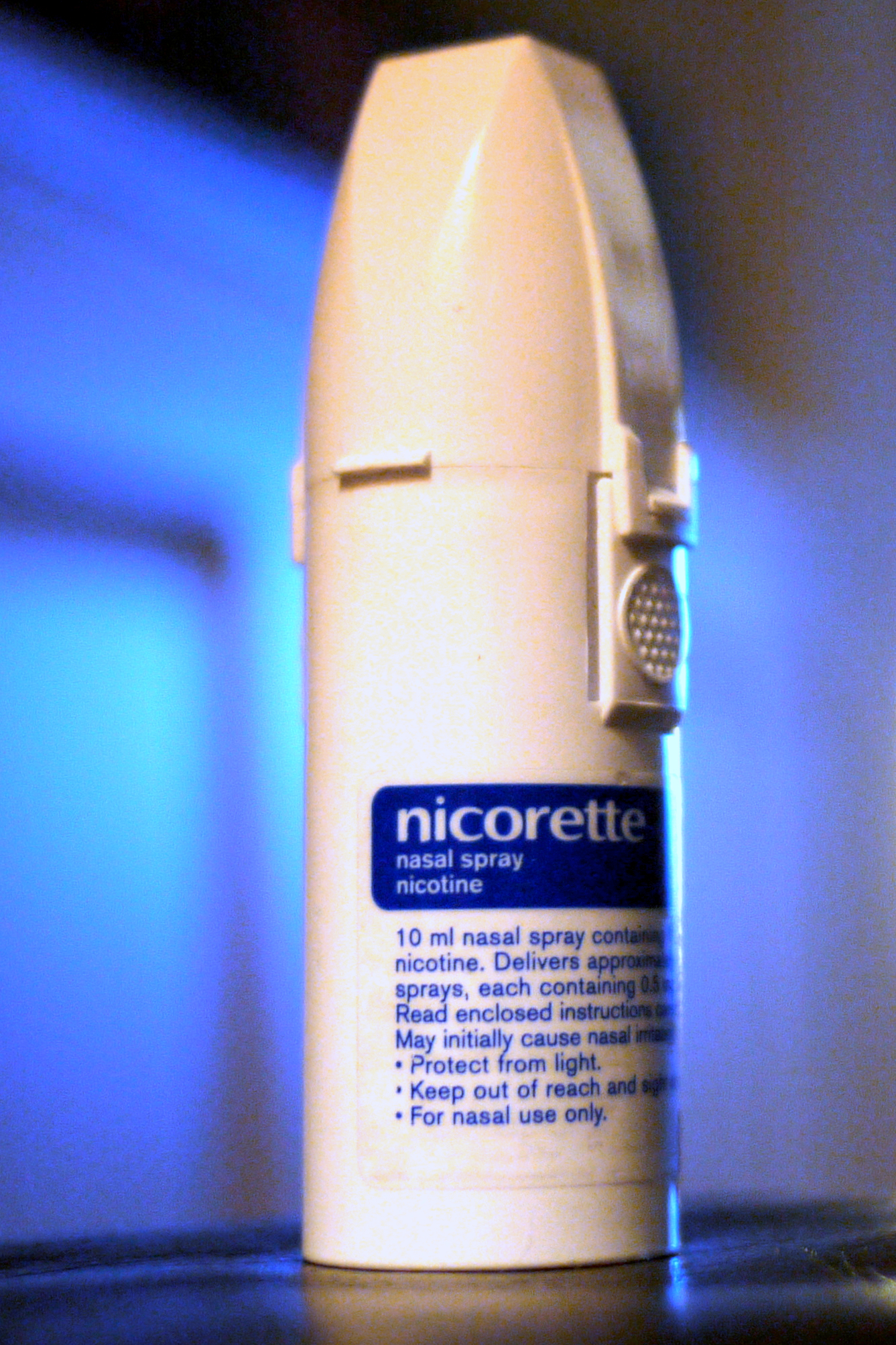
Nasal spray

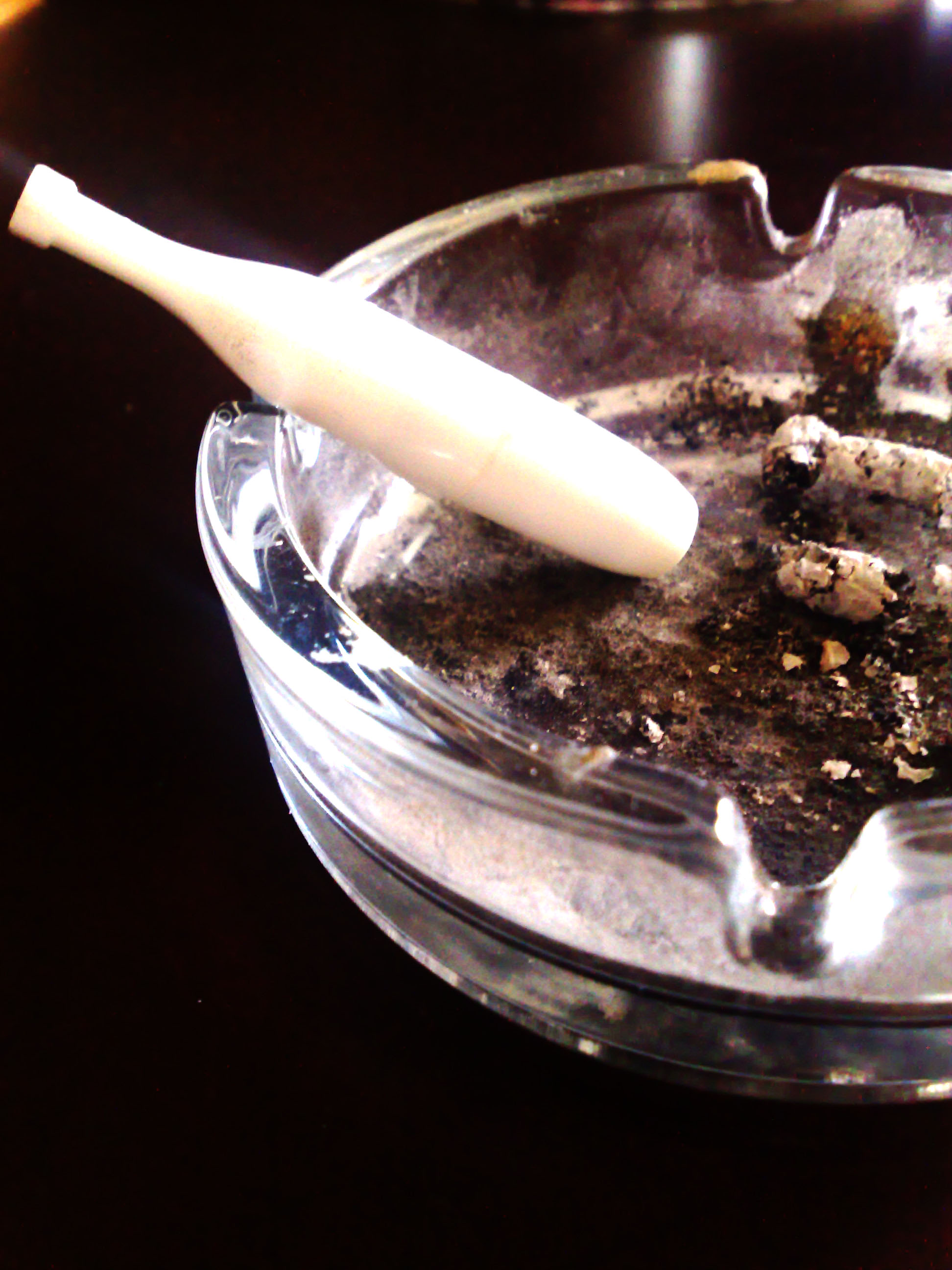
Nicorette inhalator, a nicotine vapour inhalator with disposable cartridges

Nicotine replacement therapy, in the form of gum, patches, nasal spray, inhaler and lozenges all improve the ability of people trying to quit tobacco products. Nicotine replacement therapy is as effective as medications, such as bupropion, in helping people quit smoking for at least six months. All forms of nicotine replacement therapy have similar success rates in terms of helping people stop smoking. However, the likelihood that someone will stick to a certain treatment varies, with compliance being the highest with nicotine patches, followed by nicotine gum, inhalers, and nasal sprays. Using a few different nicotine replacement methods in combination may improve success rates in stopping tobacco use. Additionally, using nicotine replacement with counseling has been proven to improve tobacco abstinence rates. These other strategies include: creating a plan to quit and utilizing quit programs, a quit phone line, or app that provides tips and inspiration to help quit.

Using nicotine replacement therapy to quit smoking should be considered for people who are severely dependent on nicotine. People who are severely dependent include those who smoke: more than one pack per day, within five minutes of awakening, while ill, when they wake up in the middle of the night, to ease withdrawal signs and symptoms.

Nicotine replacement products are most beneficial for heavy smokers who smoke more than 15 cigarettes per day. There are not enough studies to show whether NRT helps those who smoke fewer than 10 cigarettes per day.

=== Effectiveness ===
Evaluation of NRT in real-world studies produces more modest outcomes than efficacy studies conducted by industry-funded trials. The National Health Service (NHS) in England has a smoking cessation service based on pharmacotherapy in combination with counseling support. An Action on Smoking and Health (UK) (ASH) report claims that the average cost per life-year gained for every smoker successfully treated by these services is less than £1,000 (below the NICE guidelines of £20,000 per QALY (quality-adjusted life year). However, the investment in NHS stop smoking services is relatively low. A comparison with treatment costs for illicit drug users shows that £585 million is committed for 350,000 problem drug users compared to £56 million for 9 million users of tobacco. This is £6.20 for each smoker, compared to £1,670 per illegal drug user.

The claims for high efficacy and cost-effectiveness of NRT have not been substantiated in real-world effectiveness studies. Pierce and Gilpin (2002) stated their conclusion as follows: "Since becoming available over the counter, NRT appears no longer effective in increasing long-term successful cessation" (p. 1260). Efficacy studies, which are conducted using randomized controlled trials, do not transfer very well to real-world effectiveness. Bauld, Bell, McCullough, Richardson and Greaves (2009) reviewed 20 studies on the effectiveness of intensive NHS treatments for smoking cessation published between 1990 and 2007. Quit rates showed a dramatic decrease between 4-weeks and one year. A quit rate of 53% at four weeks fell to only 15% at one year. Younger smokers, females, pregnant smokers and more deprived smokers had lower quit rates than other groups.

The efficacy for each of the formulations alone (lozenges, nasal spray, gum, and transdermal patch) to aid in smoking cessation is equal. Efficacy increases 15% to 36% with combining treatments such as gum and lozenges. Higher doses increase the chance of stopping smoking for a period of six months and more. For patches, the most efficient doses were 25 mg worn over 16 hours or 21 mg worn over 24 hours. The evidence suggests that 4 mg nicotine gum leads to higher quit rates compared with 2 mg in heavy smokers. Prescription nicotine replacement therapy is associated with higher odds of quit success, whereas over-the-counter NRT was not associated with higher quit success.

== Toxicity ==
N-Nitrosonornicotine, a strong carcinogen present in unburned tobacco and cigarette smoke, has been found in the urine of some users of oral NRT products. Nicotine patches is an alternative.

== Side effects ==
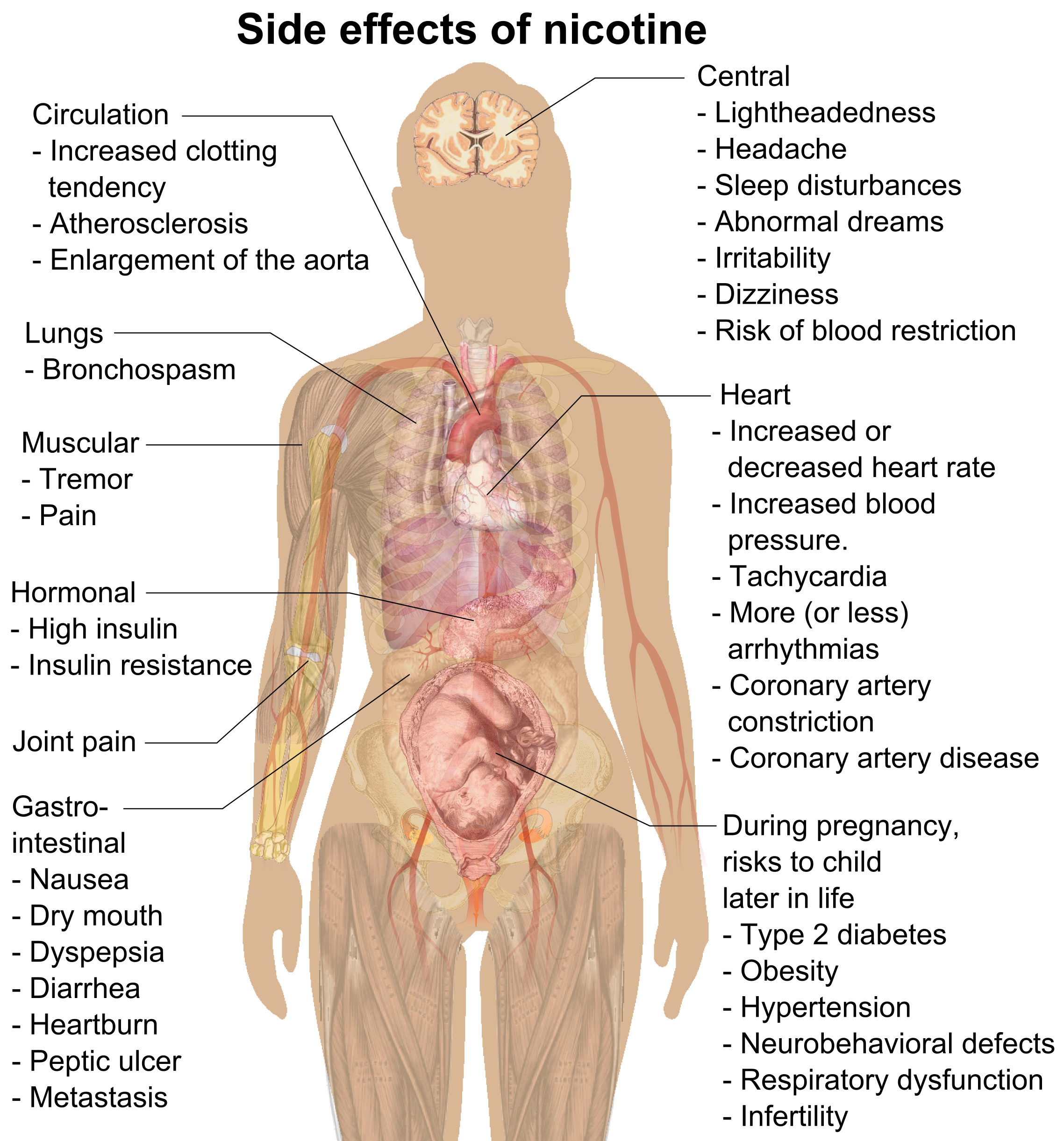
Possible side effects of nicotine

Some side effects are caused by the nicotine, and are common to NRT products. Other common side effects depend on the formulation of nicotine. Common side effects with the gum include nausea, hiccups, and irritation of the mouth. Common side effects with the patch include skin irritation and a dry mouth while the inhaler commonly results in a cough, runny nose, or headaches. To minimize local skin reactions from the patch, the application site should be moved daily. The nicotine patch can also cause strange dreams if worn while asleep. Nasal sprays commonly cause nasal irritation, watering eyes, and coughing.

Serious risks include nicotine poisoning, which includes symptoms like visual disturbances, hyper-salivation, nausea, and vomiting; and continued addiction to nicotine products. Avoiding smoking and other products with nicotine are recommended since it may lead to nicotine overdose. Although overdose is rare, it can be problematic, especially in children and pets. The symptoms of nicotine overdose include headache, pale skin and mouth, belly pain, weakness, diarrhea, tremors or seizures, agitation, confusion, restlessness, high or low blood pressure, fast or irregular heartbeat, fast breathing, and cold sweats.

Limited evidence exists regarding long-term NRT use.

A 2025 cardiovascular review described NRT as a time-limited cessation aid, rather than one for chronic use.

== Safety ==
=== Pregnancy ===
Nicotine is not safe to use in any amount during pregnancy. Nicotine crosses the placenta and is found in the breast milk of mothers who smoke as well as mothers who inhale passive smoke. There are possible harms to the baby if NRT is used during pregnancy. Thus, pregnant women and those who are breastfeeding should also consult a physician before initiating NRT. The gum, lozenge, and nasal spray are pregnancy category C. The transdermal patch is pregnancy category D. The transdermal patch is considered less safe for the fetus because it delivers continuous nicotine exposure, as opposed to the gum or lozenge, which delivers intermittent and thus lower nicotine exposure.

Strong evidence suggests that nicotine cannot be regarded as a safe substance of cigarette use. Nicotine itself could be at least partly responsible for many of the adverse after birth health results related to cigarette use while the mother was pregnant. There is evidence that nicotine negatively affects fetal brain development and pregnancy outcomes. There is also risk of stillbirth and pre-term birth. Nicotine use will probably harm fetal neurological development. Risks to the child later in life from nicotine exposure during pregnancy include type 2 diabetes, obesity, hypertension, neurobehavioral defects, respiratory dysfunction, and infertility. Nicotine exposure during pregnancy can result in attention deficit hyperactivity disorder (ADHD) and learning disabilities in the child. It also puts the child at increased risk for nicotine addiction in the future.

Pregnant women should consider behavioral therapy before NRT is considered.

=== Youth ===
In people under the age of eighteen, a physician is often consulted before starting NRT. The evidence suggests that exposure to nicotine between the ages of 10 and 25 years causes lasting harm to the brain and cognitive ability. Evidence is unclear whether adolescents gain benefit from cognitive-behavioral therapy or smoking cessation over the long-term as of 2017. Most tobacco users are under-eighteens when they start, and almost no-one over the age of 25 starts using. In 2025, the efficacy of NRT in adolescents was still unclear.

=== Cardiovascular conditions ===
While there is no evidence that NRT can increase the risk of heart attacks, individuals with pre-existing cardiovascular conditions or recent heart attacks should consult a physician before initiating NRT.

=== Other conditions ===
Nicotine replacement therapies should be used cautiously in individuals with the following conditions: severe reactive airway diseases (for nasal spray), chronic nasal disorders such as sinusitis, polyps, rhinitis, or allergy (for nasal spray), diabetes (insulin-dependent), gastrointestinal diseases such as esophagitis, active gastric or peptic ulcer disease, liver problems, hyperthyroidism, pheochromocytoma, phenylketonuria (for lozenges), renal problems, and skin conditions such as psoriasis or dermatitis (for the transdermal patch).

== Mechanism of action ==
Nicotine replacement therapy works by reducing cravings due to nicotine addiction. Smoking cigarettes releases high doses of nicotine to the brain in a matter of seconds as opposed to low doses released over a period of minutes to hours by the various forms of nicotine replacement therapy. Nicotine from NRT does not reach as high a concentration in the blood as does nicotine from smoke inhalation due to different absorption methods. NRT relies on systemic venous absorption, whereas nicotine from cigarettes reaches the arterial system. Nicotine replacement products vary in the time it takes for the nicotine to enter the body and the total time nicotine stays in the body. The more quickly a dose of nicotine is delivered and absorbed, the higher the addiction risk. It is possible to become dependent on some NRTs.

Nicotine patches are applied to the skin and continuously administer a stable dose of nicotine slowly over 16–24 hours. Nicotine gum, nicotine sprays, nicotine toothpicks, nicotine sublingual tablets, and nicotine lozenges administer nicotine orally with quicker nicotine uptake into the body but lasting a shorter amount of time. Nicotine inhalers are metered-dose inhalers that administer nicotine through the lungs and mucous membranes of the throat quickly, lasting for a short amount of time. For example, blood nicotine levels are the highest 5–10 minutes after using the nicotine nasal spray, 20 minutes after using a nicotine inhaler or chewing nicotine gum, and 2–4 hours after using a nicotine patch.

== Society and culture ==
NRT products were first approved for use in the United States in 1984. Nicotine replacement products are on the World Health Organization's List of Essential Medicines. In 2024, the World Health Organization's first clinical tobacco-cessation guideline recommended nicotine replacement therapy as an effective treatment for tobacco cessation, and nicotine gum and transdermal patches became the first WHO-prequalified NRT products. Nicotine replacement products are available as generic medication.

=== Formulations ===
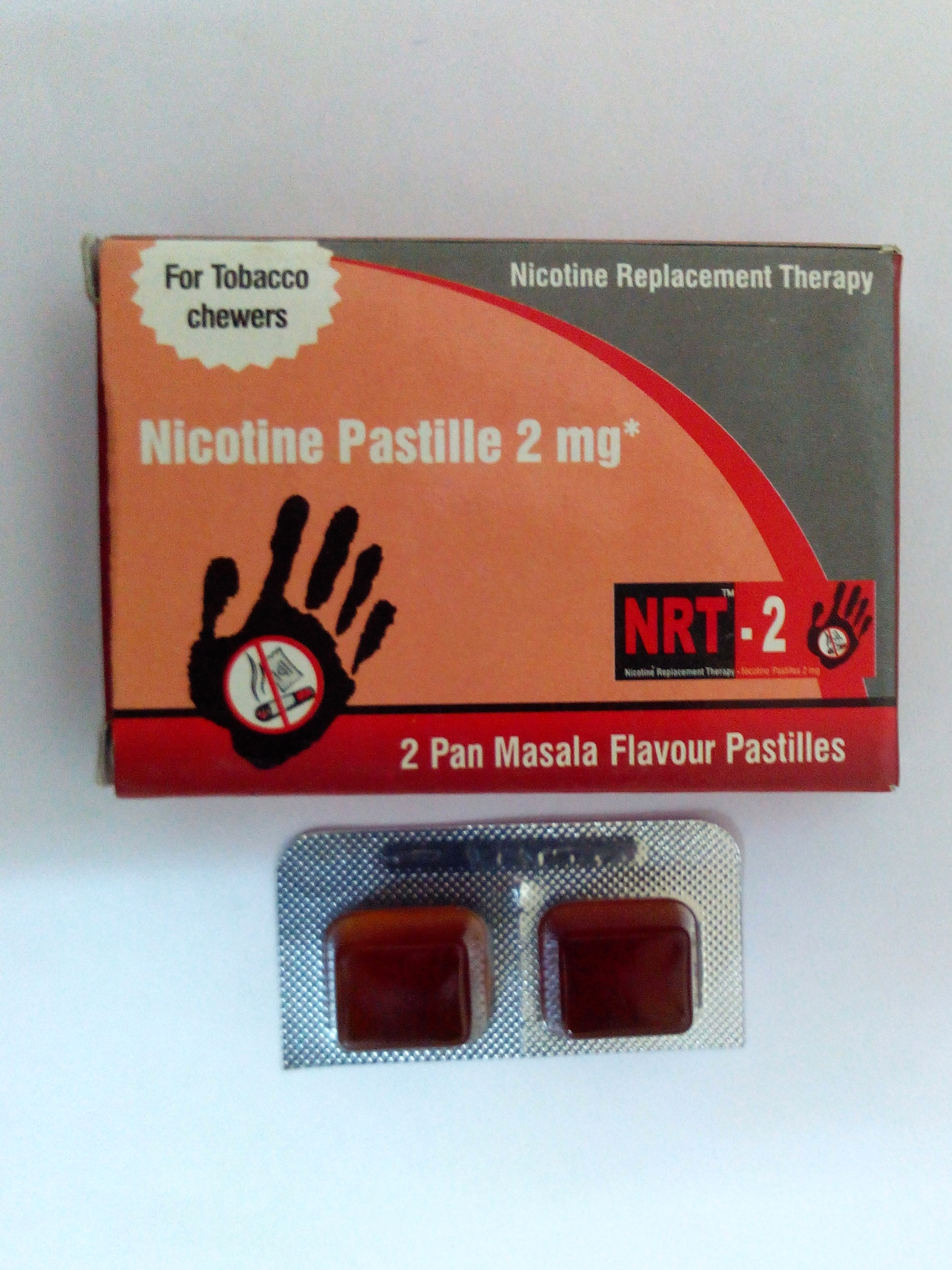
Nicotine pastilles

NRT Type	Device/package	Availability	How it works
Patch	Pouch	Over-the-counter	16 or 24 hours sustained-release transdermal patch
Lozenge	Blister pack	Over-the-counter	20 to 30 minutes modified-release dosage tablet containing nicotine polacrilex
Sublingual tablets	Blister pack	Over-the-counter	Quickly dissolves to releases nicotine through a hard candy
Gum	Blister pack	Over-the-counter	Chewing the gum releases nicotine as a modified-release dosage
Mouth spray	Mouth spray bottle	Over-the-counter	Spraying a mist into the mouth administers nicotine for buccal administration
Vapour inhalator	Nicorette Inhalator: with 10 mg nicotine disposable cartridges	Over-the-counter	Resembles cigarettes; A disposable cartridge contains about 10 mg nicotine (about 40% is released). Multiple inhaling through the mouthpiece administers sufficient nicotine.
Pressurized Metered-dose inhaler (pMDI)		Prescription	Inhaling through the mouthpiece administers nicotine
Nasal spray	Nasal spray bottle	Prescription	Spraying a pump bottle into the nose administers nicotine
Toothpicks		Over-the-counter	
Gel	Single-use packets	Over-the-counter	Weak evidence of efficacy

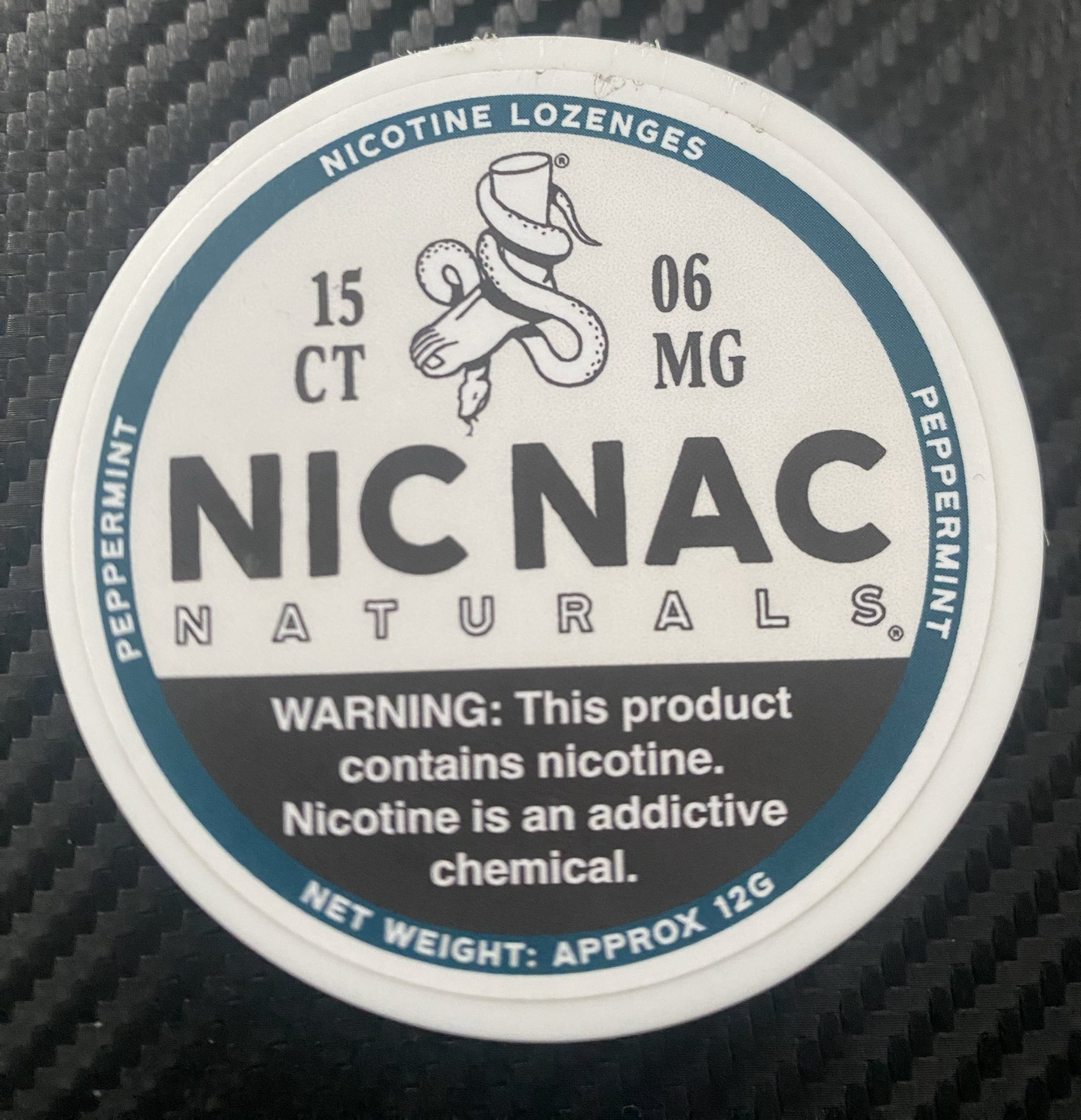
A can of Nic Nac Naturals lozenges

The nicotine patch is a once-daily, longer-acting form of NRT. An advantage of the nicotine patch is its simple compliance; it does not require active use throughout the day. The gum, lozenge, sublingual tablet, oral inhaler, oral spray, and nasal spray are acutely dosed products, providing the user with the benefit and ability of self-titrating based on cravings.

Brand names include Commit Lozenge, Nic Nac Naturals, Nicoderm, Nicogum, Nicosure, Nicorette, Nicotex, Nicotinell, and Thrive. NRT products contain similar pharmaceutical grade nicotine as is used in some e-cigarettes.

=== Medicines ===
In 2015, the United States Public Health Service listed seven agents for the stopping of tobacco, which included five nicotine replacement treatments (nicotine patches, gum, lozenges, inhalers, and nasal sprays) and two oral medications (bupropion and varenicline). Other NRT options are available, including nicotine mouth sprays and sublingual tablets.

=== Dosing ===
The dose of nicotine replacement therapy products is generally based on if the user is considered a heavy, average, or light smoker.

General guideline
Type of User	Dose of NRT	Amount of cigarettes	Amount of smokeless tobacco
Light	Lower	<10 cigarettes daily	<2 snuff cans or tobacco pouches weekly
Average	Moderate	10–20 cigarettes daily	2–3 snuff cans or tobacco pouches weekly
Heavy	Higher	1 or more pack of cigarettes daily	>3 snuff cans or tobacco pouches weekly

A cigarette delivers an average of 1 mg to 3 mg of the nicotine contained in it. NRT products typically aim to parallel this, but the amount of nicotine absorbed by the user is less than the original dose.

Nicotine nasal sprays are formulated in doses of lowest strength, available in 0.5 mg and 1 mg strengths.

Nicotine lozenges deliver doses as low as 1 mg up to 4 mg. It is not chewed as the gum would be, and dissolves in approximately 30 minutes. This formulation may be preferred by those individuals who do not find gum chewing to be acceptable.

Nicotine gum is available in doses of 2 mg and 4 mg. Using 4 mg nicotine gum versus 2 mg gum increases the likelihood of successful smoking cessation. When using the gum, acidic beverages like soda, coffee, or beer should be avoided fifteen minutes prior and during use because they can impede proper absorption of nicotine.

Nicotine inhalers come in 10 mg and 15 mg cartridge strengths and typically deliver around 4 mg in one dose. The inhaler may be preferred in individuals who want to satisfy the hand-to-mouth ritual that smoking provides.

Transdermal patches deliver between 5 mg and 52.5 mg of nicotine, which results in plasma levels similar to that of heavy smokers. Combining nicotine patch treatment with a faster nicotine-delivery means, like nicotine gum or spray, improves the likelihood of successful treatment.

=== Not approved as NRTs ===
Some smokeless consumer products available can function as alternative nicotine delivery systems (ANDS) but they have not received FDA approval as smoking-cessation therapy aids that are safe and effective.

Snus and nasal snuff also allow for nicotine administration outside of tobacco smoking. Nicotine pouches are described as similar to or a tobacco-free variant of snus. They are pre-portioned and are held in the user's lip or cheek allowing for sublingual or buccal delivery of flavors and high doses of nicotine. The small pouches are not like chewing tobacco, as the user does not need to spit since the contents of the pouches stay inside during use. Swedish pouches have been available on the American consumer market since at least 2016 but their popularity and controversy surged in 2019 and 2020. In the US and UK concerns have been raised that nicotine pouches are seemingly too similar to banned snus products, is aimed at teenagers, further complicating the youth vaping trend, falling into the hands of adolescents easily, and are discrete enough to easily pass for regular gums or lozenges.

Nicotine infused toothpicks are another product that has been available in the United States since at least 2013. They can have a total nicotine delivery that is comparable to that of nicotine gum. Nicotine toothpicks generally are infused with food-grade flavorings and 1–3 mg of nicotine, which is similar to that of other oral-delivery nicotine products and some cigarettes. In spite of these similarities, as of 2018 they have been a subject of controversy. Online retailers have been under scrutiny for allowing their products to be too easily purchased by youth. Various news outlets and school districts have expressed the concern that these products have a high appeal to minors wanting to experiment with nicotine due to; the multitude of sweet flavors offered, ease & speed of use, seeming innocuous, and having a discreet nature. In 2015, NRT sales fell for the first time since 2008 while sales for e-cigarettes or electronic nicotine delivery systems (ENDS) continued to increase at a substantial rate. The evidence is that UK smokers are trying to quit with e-cigarettes rather than NRT methods.

E-cigarettes are often, although not always, designed to look and feel like cigarettes. They have been marketed as less harmful alternatives to cigarettes, but very few are as yet approved as NRTs in any jurisdiction. Some electronic cigarettes have coarsely adjustable nicotine levels. Some healthcare groups have hesitated to recommend e-cigarettes for quitting smoking, because of limited evidence of effectiveness and safety. A 2014 study concluded that e-cigarettes appear to help smokers who were unable to stop smoking altogether to reduce their cigarette consumption when compared with placebo e-cigarettes and nicotine patches. A 2024 study concluded that the using e-cigarettes and smoking-cessation counseling resulted in greater abstinence from smoking tobacco than smoking-cessation counseling alone. Several studies have shown e-cigarettes to be the more effective tobacco smoking cessation tool in comparison to NRTs.

The U.S. Food and Drug Administration (FDA) has a list of additional tobacco products they are seeking to regulate, including electronic cigarettes. Most approved NRT products have been approved for over 20 years, however the FDA has also approved nicotine inhalers as a form of NRT. In 2024, the FDA cleared an investigational new drug (IND) application for a fast-acting inhalable NRT, which delivers nicotine without combustion or heating. 2025, the inhaler was successful in a first clinical trial, aiming to get approved by the FDA as the first smoking cessation drug since 2006.

Future approaches of NRT could include nicotine preloading, a true pulmonary inhaler, and nicotine vaccines. Nicotine preloading, otherwise known as pre-cessation or pre-quitting NRT, has found that using the patch for a few weeks before the quit date produces significantly higher quit rates than if it was started on the quit day. The true pulmonary inhaler would deliver nicotine to the lungs in a manner that more resembles cigarette smoking, which would provide better relief of background cravings as well as acute cravings. Nicotine vaccines are under investigation as a method to treat tobacco dependence through priming the body to mount an immune response against nicotine.
