= Nicogel =

Tobacco gel product

Nicogel was a "tobacco gel", applied to skin as a substitute for cigarette use. Nicogel was a smokeless tobacco product, and not a smoking cessation tool.

The product was shelled out in the early 2000s, set to make “millions of dollars” in the US due to its success in other countries, but the product has seemed to cease to exist.

== Usage ==
Nicogel claims to be a cigarette alternative and designed so tobacco users can continue using "tobacco" in a discreet form. Nicogel is sold as 50ml dispensers (containing "50 cigarette-equivalents") and as boxes of individually wrapped, single-use packets (containing either 10 or 120 cigarette-equivalents). Nicogel is "a water soluble gel containing liquefied tobacco."

Because many public places have placed bans on smoking, Nicogel touts itself as a more convenient tobacco product.

== Health effects ==
Nicogel claims that the product has 1/10 the nicotine of a cigarette. However, independent testing shows much less than 100 mcg per 1 ml. With so little nicotine, whether the product actually works is unclear. American Cancer Society's director, Thomas J. Glynn, Ph.D., warns that "no independent research has been conducted to validate whether it's effective and safe," and that there is "no indication of [the] toxicity or level of nicotine it delivers."

Nicogel has not been proven to be dermatologically tested, so there is no public data on whether the product is safe for use on normal skin. Nicogel may irritate sensitive skin and cause rashes, allergies, or red and swollen skin. The makers advise pregnant or breast-feeding women to avoid Nicogel, and assert that drinking alcohol in moderation is safe while using Nicogel.

Nicogel contains on average only .015 mg to max. 0.03 mg of nicotine per serving of approx. 1ml. According to the manufacturer, Nicogel does not contain (N)-Nitrosamines.. However, that has not been substantiated and no documents are available.

== See also ==
- Tobacco
- Nicotine
- Cigarettes
