= Nicotine patch =

Transdermal patch that releases nicotine into the body

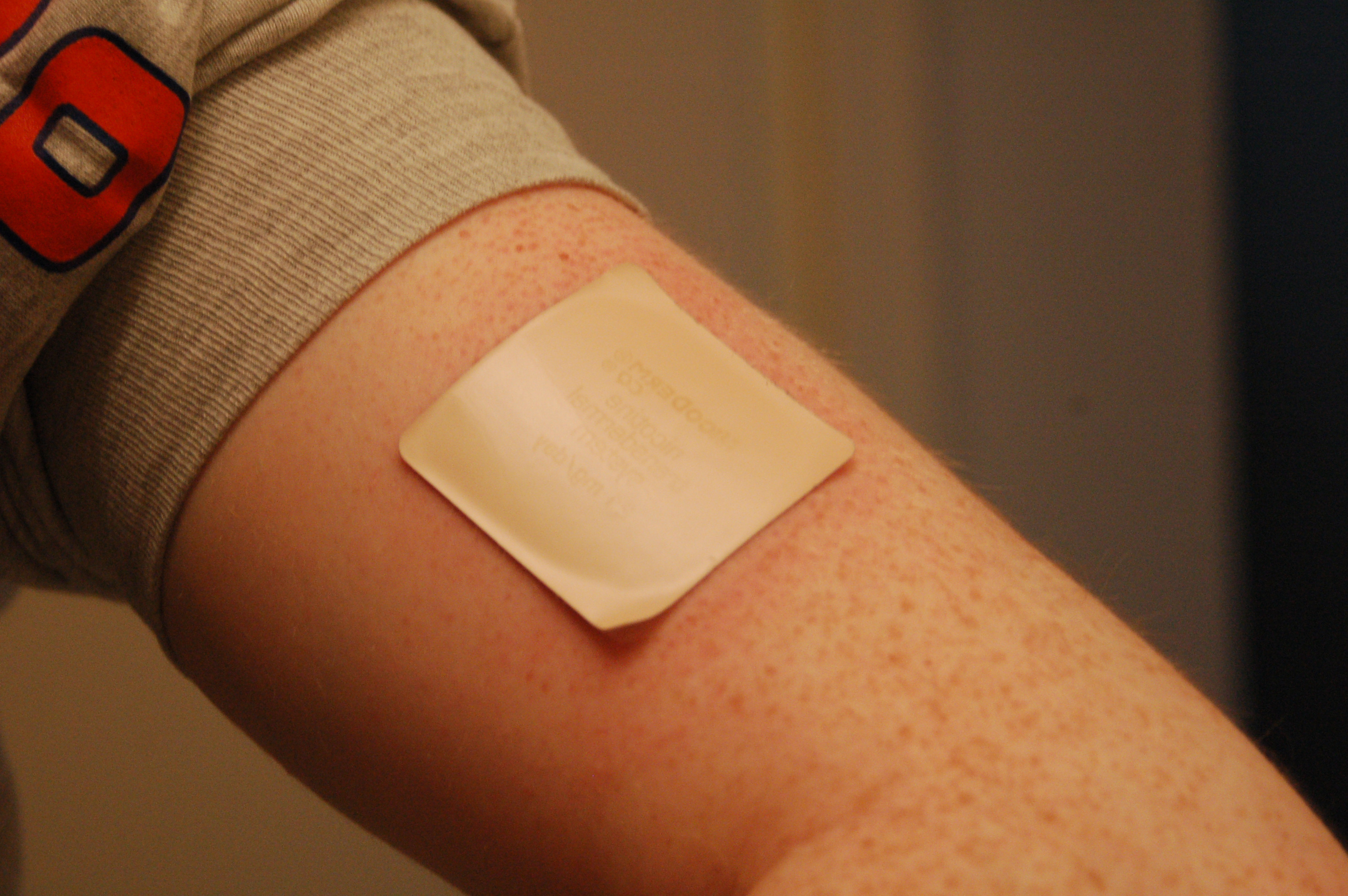
A 21 mg dose patch applied to the arm

A nicotine patch is a transdermal patch that releases nicotine into the body through the skin. It is used in nicotine replacement therapy (NRT), a process for smoking cessation. Endorsed and approved by the U.S. Food and Drug Administration, it is considered one of the safer NRTs available for the treatment of tobacco use disorder.

Nicotine replacement products including gum and transdermal patches are on the World Health Organization's List of Essential Medicines.

== Medical uses ==
A 2018 meta-analysis found that fewer than 20% of people treated with nicotine replacement therapy remain abstinent from smoking at one year.

== History ==
The first study of the pharmacokinetics of a transdermal nicotine patch in humans was published in 1984 by Jed Rose, Murray Jarvik, and Daniel Rose, and was followed by publication by Rose et al. (1985) of results of a study of smokers showing that a transdermal nicotine patch reduced craving for cigarettes. Frank Etscorn filed a patent in the United States on January 23, 1985 and was issued the patent on July 1, 1986. The University of California filed a competing patent application nearly three years after Etscorn's filing on February 19, 1988, which was granted on May 1, 1990. Subsequently, the U.S. Patent Office declared an interference action and, after a thorough review of conception, reduction to practice and patent filing dates, issued on September 29, 1993, a priority decision in favor of the Rose et al. patent.

== Research ==
Research has shown that NRT in combination with cognitive behavioral therapy (CBT) can improve the rates of smoking cessation in pregnant women. CBT counseling includes motivational interviewing, Transtheoretical Model of Behavior Change, and Social Cognitive Theory.

Nicotine patches are under study to help relieve the symptoms of postoperative pain and to treat early dementia.

Studies are being conducted about the use of transdermal nicotine patches to treat anxiety, depression, and inattentiveness in subjects with attention deficit hyperactivity disorder and to treat late-life depression.

Two small studies have shown that transdermal nicotine patches improve some symptoms of ulcerative colitis. However, this is not the case with Crohn's disease, a similar health condition, where smoking and nicotine intake in general worsen the disease's effects.

== Application ==
The patch is typically worn for 16 to 24 hours. Patches can be removed at night prior to bed if vivid dreams are experienced and undesirable.

== Side effects ==
A study published in the medical journal JAMA Internal Medicine in 2015 found that the most common side effects experienced when using a nicotine patch include: cough, headache, nausea, light-headedness, insomnia, disturbing dreams, sweating, watery eyes, shortness of breath, and skin irritation at the application site. The same study found that the following side effects were reported by patch wearers less frequently: diarrhea, dizziness, coldness in limbs, vomiting, and fast or pounding heart beat.

== Availability ==
Nicotine patches are available for purchase over-the-counter from various manufacturers, without a prescription.

Example of nicotine patch regimen (NicoDerm CQ)
NicoDerm CQ patch strength	For a person who smokes 10 or fewer cigarettes per day	For a person who smokes more than 10 cigarettes per day
21 mg	Do not use this patch strength.	Step 1: Apply 1 patch per day for 6 weeks.
14 mg	Step 1: Apply 1 patch per day for 6 weeks.	Step 2: Apply 1 patch per day for 2 weeks.
7 mg	Step 2: Apply 1 patch per day for 2 weeks.	Step 3: Apply 1 patch per day for 2 weeks.
	Total patch treatment period: 8 weeks	Total patch treatment period: 10 weeks

== See also ==
- Nicotine lozenge
- Nicotine gum
