= Nicotine gum =

Type of chewing gum that delivers nicotine to the body

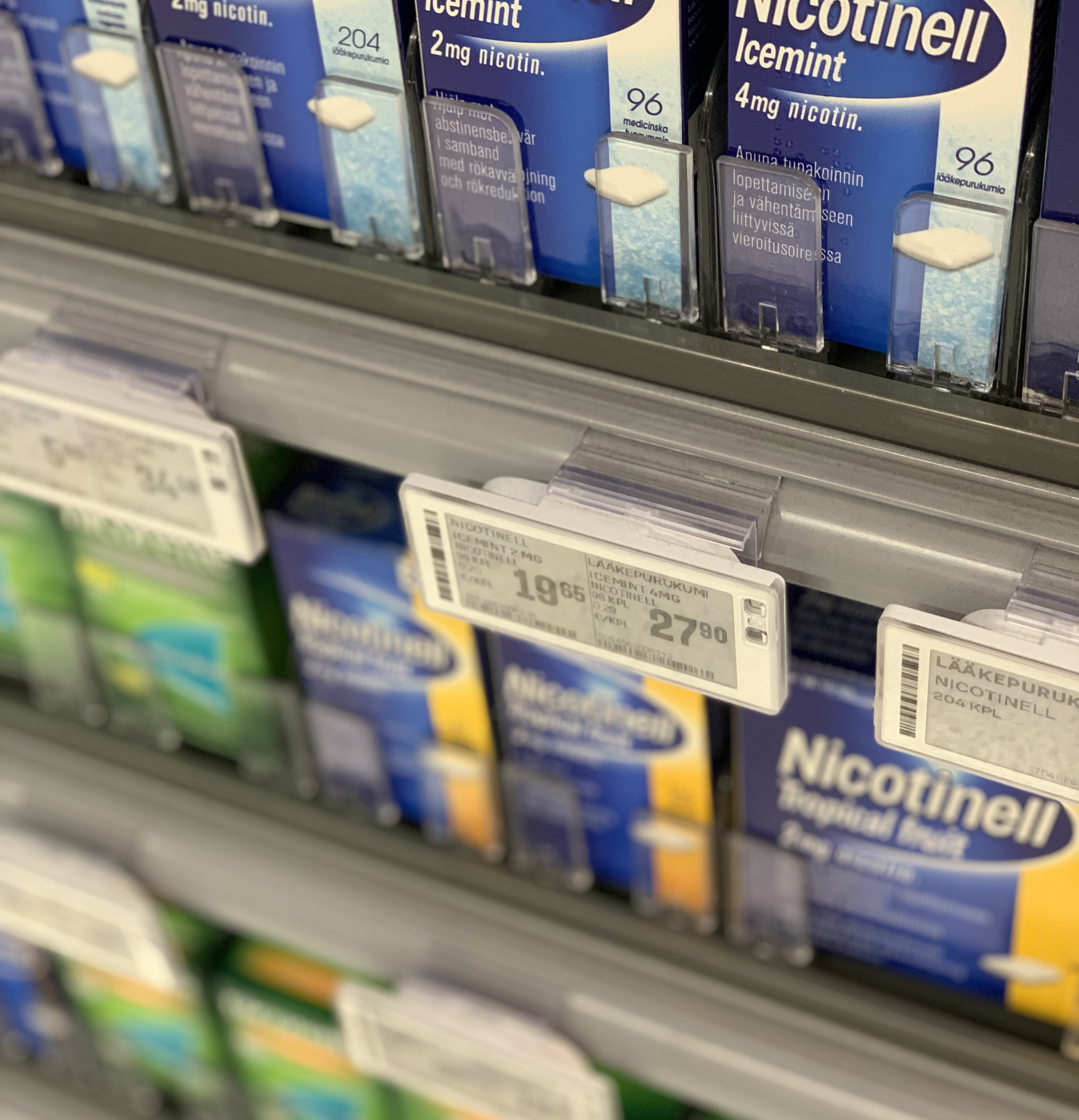

Nicotine gum is a chewing gum containing the active ingredient nicotine polacrilex. It is a type of nicotine replacement therapy (NRT) used alone or in combination with other pharmacotherapy for smoking cessation and for quitting smokeless tobacco. NRT gives nicotine without the other harmful chemicals in tobacco smoke.

Nicotine gum is available via general, pharmaceutical, and online sales without the need for a prescription. Flavor options range from mint and cinnamon to various fruit flavors, and doses range from 2–6 mg, though it is most commonly sold in 2 and 4 mg strengths. Common side effects include mouth irritation or ulcers, jaw pain, and hiccups. Although nicotine in tobacco products is associated with increased cardiovascular risk, hyperlipidemia, and increased insulin resistance, there is insufficient evidence to demonstrate that nicotine found in nicotine gum has the same health effects. The Food and Drug Administration (FDA) states that nicotine is the addictive chemical in tobacco, but that the mix of thousands of chemicals in tobacco and tobacco smoke, rather than nicotine, is what causes serious disease and death in tobacco users.

Nicotine gum and other NRT products are on the World Health Organization's List of Essential Medicines.

== Medical use ==
Nicotine gum is a chewing gum containing a small dose of nicotine polacrilex. It is classified as a short-acting (also called fast-acting) form of NRT because it relieves the cravings and symptoms that occur with smoking cessation more quickly than a long-acting NRT (i.e., the nicotine patch). It can be used alone or in conjunction with other forms of pharmacotherapy for cessation of tobacco products.

The nicotine contained in nicotine gum is released with chewing and is absorbed through the lining of the mouth to enter the bloodstream. Due to this fact, nicotine gum is not chewed like regular chewing gum, but follows a "chew and park" protocol: the gum is chewed slowly until a peppery taste or tingling sensation can be felt in the mouth; the gum is then "parked" and held between the gums and the inside of the cheek for about a minute until the tingling subsides; chewing is resumed when the tingling fades. This procedure repeats, occasionally changing where the gum is parked in the mouth, until the tingle can no longer be felt, usually about 30 minutes after starting. On account of its short-acting nature, nicotine gum requires repeated use throughout the day, and its reliance on chewing as the mechanism of nicotine release leads to more variable levels of nicotine in the blood than the patch.

=== Monotherapy vs combination therapy ===
Whether using two types of NRT or pharmacotherapy (e.g., bupropion, varenicline) plus NRT, a combination of interventions has been shown to be more effective than monotherapy in achieving tobacco cessation. In addition, behavioral interventions such as in-person counseling, telehealth services, and self-help programs have been shown to further improve tobacco cessation rates.

Nicotine gum is often used in conjunction with a long-acting nicotine patch. The patch delivers nicotine slowly and consistently throughout the day to achieve a stable level of nicotine in the blood, and the short-acting gum is used as needed to provide immediate relief of breakthrough cravings and withdrawal symptoms. Side effects and adherence rates of using the gum and patch together are similar to using either NRT alone.

== Dosing ==
Nicotine gum is commonly available in two strengths: 2 mg and 4 mg. Dosing is based on cigarette usage. Individuals who smoke their first cigarette within 30 minutes of waking up or smoke more than 25 cigarettes daily are recommended to use the 4 mg gum. Individuals who smoke their first cigarette at least 30 minutes after waking or smoke fewer than 25 cigarettes daily are recommended to use the 2 mg gum. Individuals who smoke fewer than 10 cigarettes daily or do not smoke every day may prefer a lower dose and to use the gum less frequently.

Nicotine gum is not a direct replacement for cigarettes, but rather aims to reduce the nicotine level in the blood gradually over a period of twelve weeks. Both 2 mg and 4 mg strengths follow the same dosing schedule:

Dosing schedule
Week	Pieces of gum
Weeks 1–6	1 piece every 1–2 hours
Weeks 7–9	1 piece every 2–4 hours
Weeks 10–12	1 piece every 5–8 hours

Because acidic foods and beverages such as soda, coffee, and beer interfere with the absorption of nicotine by the oral mucosa, eating or drinking 15 minutes prior to or during chewing gum use is discouraged. For strong or frequent cravings, a second piece of gum may be used within an hour of finishing the previous piece. However, continuous back-to-back usage is discouraged to minimize the risk of side effects. In the initial six weeks, a minimum of 9 pieces and a maximum of 24 pieces of gum are recommended daily. It is recommended to complete the full twelve-week regimen.

== Side effects ==
Side effects of nicotine gum arise from vigorous chewing, which releases excess nicotine. Chewing nicotine gum may cause jaw soreness. Oral mucosal irritation or ulcers can occur if the gum is repeatedly "parked" in the same location in the mouth. Similarly, excess nicotine swallowed with saliva may cause a sore throat due to esophageal irritation, or gastrointestinal symptoms such as abdominal pain, nausea, and vomiting. It can aggravate gastrointestinal conditions such as peptic ulcer disease, gastroesophageal reflux disease, and pancreatitis. Hiccups may occur due to nicotine's vasodilatory effects on blood vessels in skeletal muscle. As an activator of the sympathetic nervous system, nicotine can cause light-headedness or dizziness, headache, and increased saliva production.

Due to nicotine's vasoconstrictive effects in the skin and heart, nicotine gum transiently increases heart rate and blood pressure, and consequently myocardial work. However, there is no consensus information available regarding the cardiovascular risk of NRT relative to smoking. Furthermore, smoking while using NRT has not been shown to increase the risk of a cardiovascular event.

In addition to following the chewing instructions, the dose of nicotine gum can be adjusted for individuals experiencing side effects.

== Safety concerns ==
=== Dependence ===
Compared to cigarettes, NRT products deliver nicotine to the brain more slowly and produce lower levels of nicotine in the blood. No relationship has been established between NRT use and risk of dependence when products are used as instructed.

=== Cancer ===
No causal relationship has been shown between exposure to nicotine in NRT and cancer. The Centers for Disease Control and Prevention stated that using a nicotine medicine does not cause cancer like smoking.

=== Dental health and TMJ disorders ===
Nicotine gum is sugar-free. Chewing nicotine gum does not increase risk for cavities or gum disease beyond the inherent risk associated with nicotine. However, nicotine gum may exacerbate poor dentition and may not be compatible with dental appliances such as dentures, bridges, and crowns. The frequent chewing associated with nicotine gum use can also worsen temporomandibular joint (TMJ) disorders.

=== Cardiovascular health ===
Smoking increases the risk for acute cardiovascular events such as myocardial infarction and stroke, and chronic cardiovascular disease such as atherosclerosis. However, no association has been established between NRT and increased cardiovascular risk. Side effects of nicotine gum include increased heart rate and blood pressure (see side effects, above), but nicotine gum is not contraindicated in individuals with coronary disease. The Centers for Disease Control and Prevention stated that nicotine replacement therapy is much less likely to cause heart disease than continued smoking.

=== Diabetes ===
Nicotine from cigarettes is known to increase blood sugar levels and promote insulin resistance in type 2 diabetics. However, there is insufficient evidence regarding the relationship between NRT and diabetes.

=== Hyperlipidemia ===
No relationship has been established regarding NRT use and its impact on cholesterol, HDL, or LDL levels.

=== Hepatotoxicity ===
Nicotine that enters the gastrointestinal system is largely metabolized by the liver. Nicotine used in NRT products has not been shown to cause or worsen liver damage.

=== Reproduction and development ===
There is insufficient evidence to establish a relationship between NRT use in pregnancy and increased risk of fetal loss and spontaneous abortion, birth weight, preterm birth, neonatal intensive care admissions, or incidence of congenital abnormalities. There is no evidence of significantly poorer reproductive or developmental outcomes in NRT users who are pregnant. No studies on nicotine gum use in nursing mothers have been reported.

Nicotine gum is designated pregnancy risk category C by the US Food and Drug Administration, indicating that while animal studies have demonstrated an adverse effect on the fetus, there is an absence of adequate and well-controlled studies in pregnant women. The potential benefits may therefore warrant the use of nicotine gum in pregnant women despite the potential risks.

=== Adolescent use ===
The US FDA has not approved NRT for use by adolescents under 18 years of age. There is limited research available on the effectiveness of NRT on pediatric populations. Following, there is insufficient evidence to suggest serious adverse effects caused by NRT use in adolescents. Adolescents require a prescription from a healthcare provider for all forms of NRT.

== See also ==
- Nicotine replacement therapy
- Smoking cessation

=== Short-acting NRT ===
- Nicotine lozenge
- Nicotine inhaler
- Nicotine nasal spray

=== Long-acting NRT ===
- Nicotine patch
