= Nicotine polacrilex =

Nicotine in ion-exchange resin

Clinical data
- Trade names: Nicorette
- License data: US DailyMed: Nicotine polacrilex
- Routes of administration: By mouth
- ATC code: None

Legal status
- Legal status: UK: General sales list (GSL, OTC); US: OTC; EU: OTC; SE: OTC

Identifiers
- UNII: 6M3C89ZY6R

Nicotine polacrilex is nicotine bound to an ion-exchange resin (polymethacrylic acid, such as Amberlite IRP64, Purolite C115HMR or Doshion P551). It is added to gum and hard lozenges used for nicotine replacement therapy in smoking cessation, such as in the Nicorette range of products. The use of the polymer as a delivery system maximizes the amount of nicotine released and absorbed by the oral mucosa. 80 to 90 percent of the nicotine released from the gum is absorbed by the mouth. Side effects of the gum include bad taste, nausea, dyspepsia, and stomatitis.
