= Nicotine lozenge =

Nicotine product for tobacco cessation

A nicotine lozenge is a modified-release dosage tablet (usually flavored) that contains a dose of nicotine polacrilex, which dissolves slowly in the mouth to release nicotine over the course of 20 to 30 minutes. Nicotine lozenges are intended to help individuals quit smoking and are generally an over-the-counter medication. Nicotine lozenges are commonly found in 2 mg and 4 mg strengths, although other strengths may be found. The nicotine is absorbed through the lining of the mouth and enters the blood vessels. It is used as an aid in nicotine replacement therapy (NRT), a process for smoking cessation.

== Side effects ==
- Nausea
- Mouth irritation
- Sore throat
- Heartburn
- Hiccups
- Cravings for cigarettes
- Restlessness
- Difficulty concentrating

== Drug interactions ==
There are few interactions between nicotine and prescription medications (e.g., adenosine, cimetidine, varenicline), but the act of quitting smoking can impact the effect of other medications. Some of the medications are:

- Antipsychotic medications
- Heart-related medications
- Caffeine

== Contraindications and precautions ==
Nicotine replacement therapy cannot be used in those with any type of nicotine sensitivity. Nicotine lozenge should not be used in those with soy allergies.

Pregnant women or women who are breast feeding should speak with their health care providers and get their approval before using nicotine lozenges.

Nicotine lozenge should be used in caution in those with the following:

- Diabetes
- Heart disease
- Asthma
- Stomach ulcers
- A recent heart attack
- High blood pressure
- A history of irregular heartbeat
- Mouth problems
- Been prescribed another medication to help quit smoking

== Symptoms of overdose ==
Symptoms of nicotine overdose include the following:

- Vomiting
- Diarrhea
- Dizziness
- Irregular heartbeat

== Storage and disposal ==
It is recommended that nicotine lozenges be kept in the original container, at room temperature and away from excessive heat or moisture. The container should be stored in a secure location away from children or pets.

Unused lozenges should be taken to a medication take-back program or otherwise disposed of in accordance with applicable laws.

== See also ==
- Nicotine replacement therapy
- Nic Nac Naturals
- Nicotine gum
- Nicotine patch
