= Nic Nac Naturals =

American nicotine lozenge company

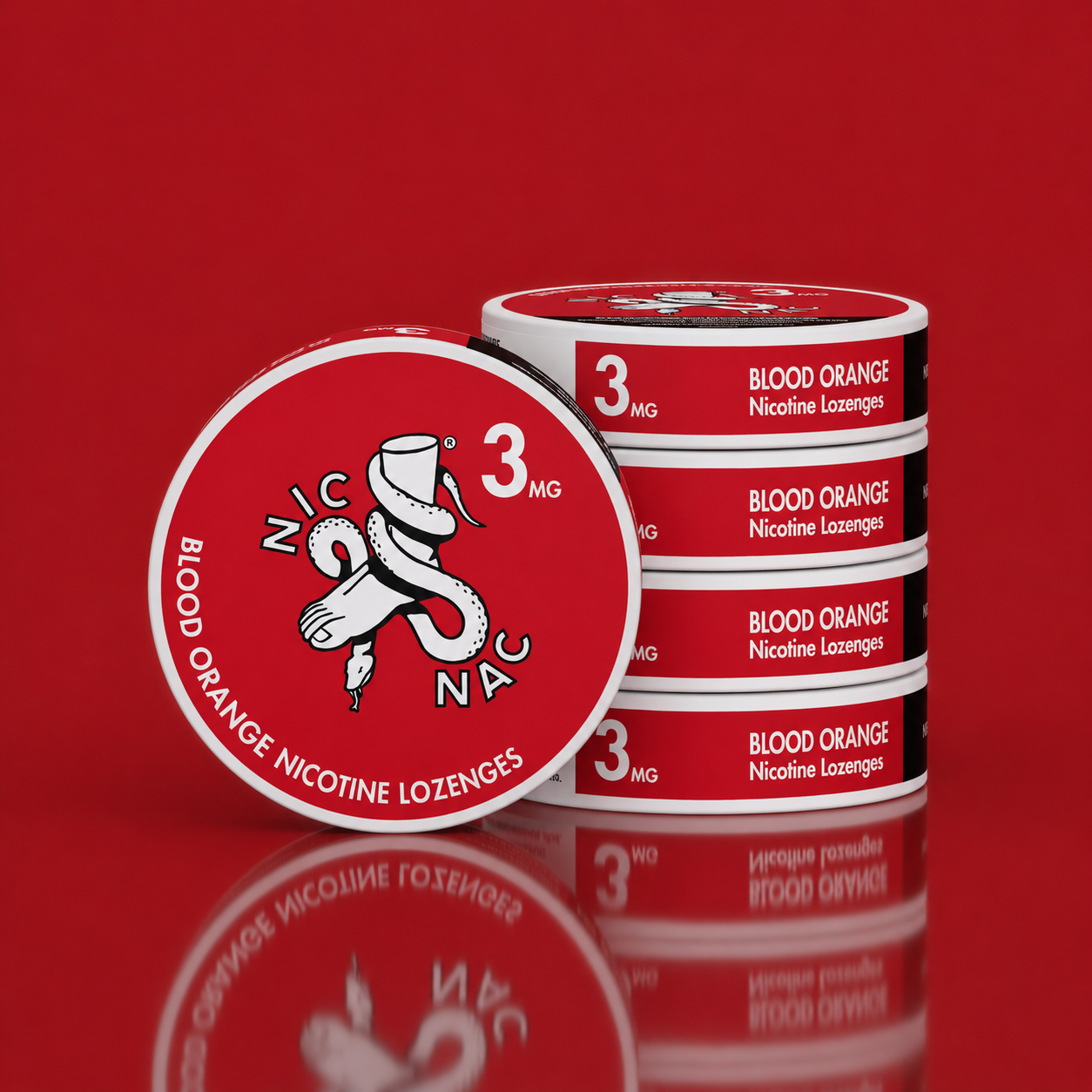
Nic Nac Packaging, Non-Tobacco Nicotine Lozenges

Nic Nac Naturals, LLC "Nic Nac" is a Spokane, Washington-based company that manufactures dissolvable nicotine lozenges." The company was founded by Nicco Magnotto, who launched the company in late 2018.

== Products ==
Nic Nac produces nicotine lozenges in mint and fruit flavors. The dosages are 3-milligram and 6-milligram nicotine strengths and are made using non-tobacco (synthetic) nicotine. It also uses xylitol and essential oils for flavoring. Magnotto and others describe the lozenges as a discreet way to consume nicotine, free from artificial sweeteners, fillers, and harsh pH adjusters.

== Regulatory issues ==
On November 7, 2023, the U.S. Food and Drug Administration (FDA) issued a warning letter to Nic Nac Naturals for marketing unauthorized dissolvable nicotine products. FDA stated that it regulates non-tobacco nicotine as it would tobacco nicotine. FDA noted that these products lacked premarket authorization, rendering them adulterated and misbranded under the Federal Food, Drug, and Cosmetic Act. The company was given 15 working days to respond with corrective actions to avoid further regulatory measures. Nic Nac subsequently responded to the warning letter by submitting a new PMTA following the changes described in its response to the FDA. This included updates to the company name, product labeling, website, and marketing materials, including changing "nicotine mints" to "nicotine lozenges". As of July 2026, the FDA has not announced any further enforcement action against the company, and no close-out letter has been published.

== Operations ==
In 2018, Nic Nac was formed. The founder, Nicco Magnotto, raised $650,000 from friends and family to start the company. In 2021, Nic Nac leased a 6,500-square-foot facility in Spokane's Hillyard neighborhood. By February 2023, the company reported $100,000 in sales and aimed to distribute products to 100 locations in the Spokane area by the end of 2023.
