= Nicotine nasal spray =

A nicotine nasal spray is a nasal spray that contains a small dose of nicotine, which enters the blood by being absorbed through the lining of the nose. This helps stop nicotine cravings and relieves symptoms that occur when a person is trying to quit smoking. A prescription is needed for nicotine nasal spray in many countries. In the United Kingdom, it can be purchased in a pharmacy as an over-the-counter drug.

In the United States, nicotine nasal spray is marketed under the brand name Nicotrol NS. The product was approved by the Food and Drug Administration in 1996 as a prescription aid for adult smokers attempting to stop smoking.

According to U.S. product labelling, Nicotrol NS is indicated as an aid for smoking cessation and temporary relief of nicotine withdrawal symptoms and should be used as part of a comprehensive behavioural smoking-cessation programme. The labelling states that treatment is generally recommended for about three months, and that the safety and efficacy of use beyond six months have not been adequately studied, therefore prolonged use is not recommended.

Common adverse effects of nicotine nasal spray include a hot or peppery sensation in the nose or throat, sneezing, coughing, watery eyes, runny nose and throat irritation, particularly during the first week of treatment; these local symptoms usually lessen with continued use.

In a randomized, double-blind, placebo-controlled trial of adult smokers seeking to quit, 27% of participants assigned to nicotine nasal spray plus behavioural support remained continuously abstinent at 12 months compared with 15% in the placebo-spray group, with abstinence verified by exhaled carbon monoxide measurements.
