= Philip Morris Ukraine =

Ukrainian subsidiary of Philip Morris

PJSC Philip Morris Ukraine
- Company type: Private joint-stock company
- Industry: Tobacco industry
- Founded: 24 May 1994
- Headquarters: Kyiv, Ukraine
- Parent: Philip Morris International
- Divisions: Manufacturing facility in Dokuchaievske village (Kharkiv Oblast)
- Subsidiaries: LLC Philip Morris Sales and Distribution
- Website: pmi.com/markets/ukraine/uk

Philip Morris Ukraine is the Ukrainian subsidiary of the American tobacco corporation Philip Morris International, with a product portfolio consisting of cigarettes and smoke-free products.

Philip Morris is one of the largest investors and taxpayers in Ukraine. According to company data, during the period of operation in Ukraine (as of August 2021), the company paid more than US$12.3 billion in taxes, while total investments exceeded US$700 million.

The company is one of the largest exporters in Ukraine – during the first 9 months in 2022, exports amounted to US$48 million.

The company has been repeatedly recognized as one of the best employers in Ukraine.

== History ==
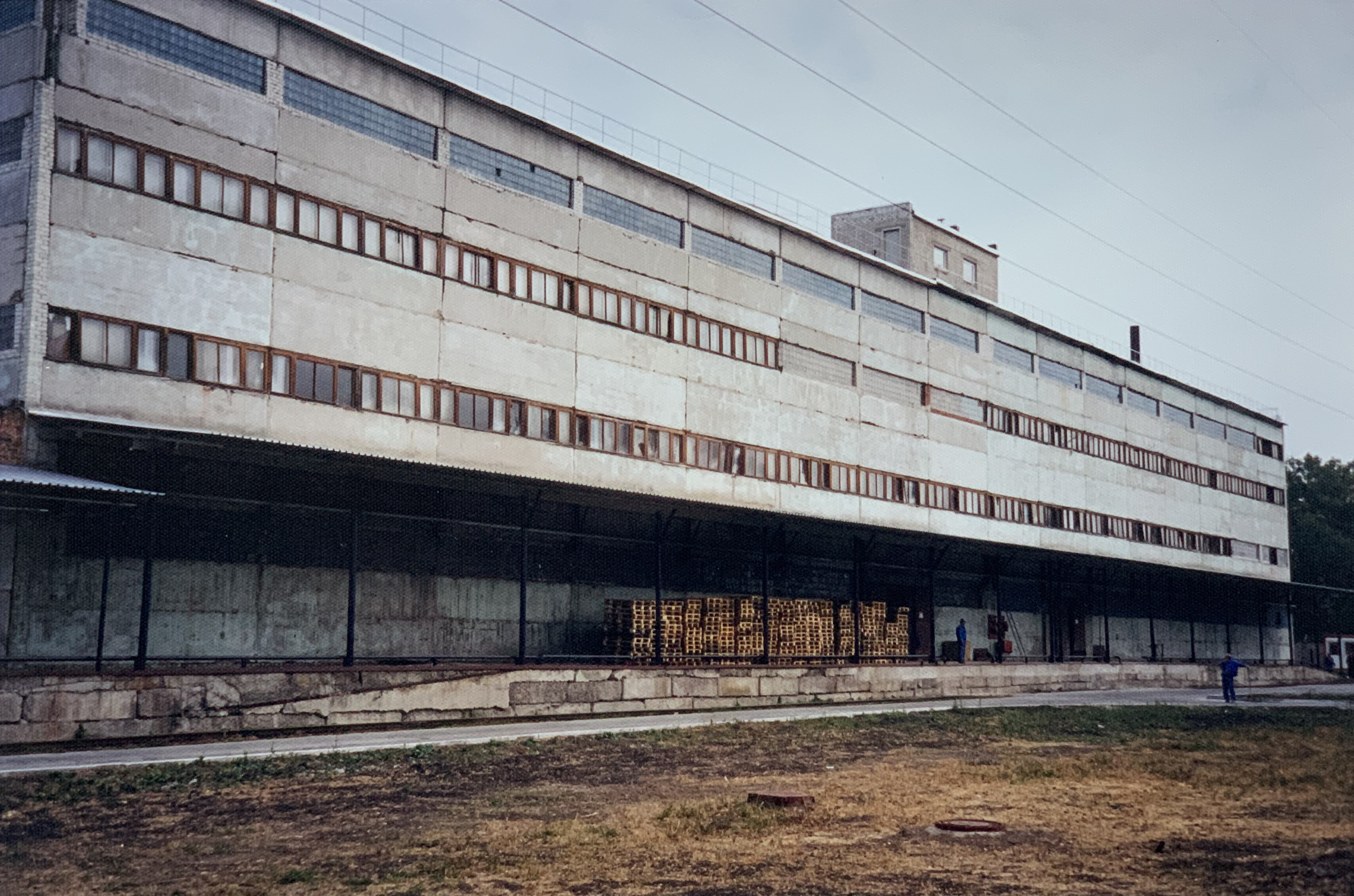
Tobacco factory in Kharkiv before reconstruction

Philip Morris International established the Philip Morris Ukraine subsidiary in 1994. The same year, PMI acquired a 51% stake in a tobacco manufacturing facility in Kharkiv. Until 1998 the facility was upgraded, with almost 90% of equipment replaced.

In 2003, the company started construction of a new facility in Dokuchaievske village Kharkiv region, Kharkiv oblast, which opened in May 2006.

Before the full-scale Russian invasion of Ukraine the company's Kharkiv factory produced almost 20 billion cigarettes per year. Half of these were exported to more than 20 countries worldwide including Armenia, Czech Republic, Egypt, Georgia, Israel, Japan, Lithuania, Moldova, Montenegro, South Korea and others.

Following the February 2022 full-scale Russian invasion of Ukraine, the Philip Morris facility in the Kharkiv oblast temporarily suspended its operation due to ongoing hostilities in the region. To ensure stable supply to Ukraine, the company initially arranged imports from eight Philip Morris International facilities in Switzerland, the Czech Republic, Poland, Portugal, Kazakhstan, Turkey, Mexico, and Brazil. In August 2022, the company organized temporary partnership with a third-party manufacturer in Kyiv.

In June 2023, Philip Morris International announced an investment of US$30 million to launch a new production facility in the Lviv oblast. Company officials explained: "Philip Morris wants to send a powerful signal to other international investors that Ukraine is a place where we can and should invest despite current risks". The location for construction of the new plant was suggested by Ukraine's government investment agency UkraineInvest. Pre-construction activities began in August 2023. The facility is scheduled to be open and running in early 2024.

In 2023, Philip Morris paid more than UAH 30 billion in taxes to the Ukrainian budget.

== Smoke-free Future Strategy ==
Philip Morris International (PMI) is the first tobacco corporation with a strategy to deliver a smoke-free future. The company started developing smoke-free products in 2008. As of 2022, PMI had invested US$10.5 billion into research and development involving over 400 researchers.

In 2014, the Philip Morris International launched the IQOS tobacco heating system in Japan and Italy. On 30 April 2019, the US Food and Drug Administration (FDA) authorized sales of IQOS in the US. On 7 July 2020, the FDA authorized the marketing of IQOS as a modified risk tobacco product (MRTP).

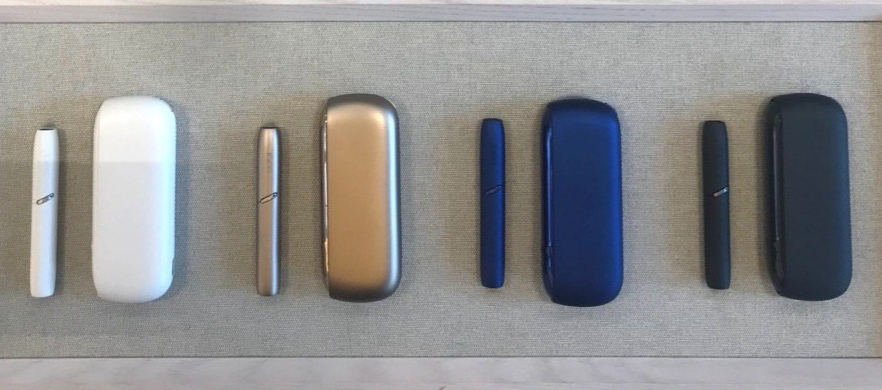
IQOS 3 in different colors

Since 2016, PMI smoke-free products have been available for sale in Ukraine. As of June 2020, according to company information, more than 600,000 adult smokers in Ukraine switched to IQOS and stopped smoking traditional cigarettes. As of January 2022, the number of IQOS users in Ukraine reached 1.4 million persons.

In September 2020, Ukraine became the second market where PMI launched sales of the new Lil SOLID tobacco heating device, along with Fiit tobacco heat sticks.

In December 2021, the company established the recycling of electronic devices sold in Ukraine, such as IQOS, IQOS VEEV, and lil.

== Brands ==
Tobacco heating systems

IQOS is a tobacco heating system. This electronic device heats tobacco-filled sticks without burning to generate a nicotine-containing aerosol. The device consists of a pen-like holder and a charger. It is compatible with HEETS tobacco sticks.

Lil SOLID is an “all-in-one” tobacco heating system (no separate holder and charger). It has been commercialized in line with an agreement between KT&G and Philip Morris International. It is compatible with Fiit tobacco sticks.

BONDS is an “all-in-one” tobacco heating system. Unlike IQOS and lil, BONDS has no heating blade or pin-based. It heats the tobacco thanks to resistive external heating. It is compatible with BLENDS tobacco sticks.

For tobacco heating systems, the company has developed a range of tobacco sticks under the HEETS, Fiit and BLENDS brands..

Cigarette brands:

Philip Morris cigarette brands on the Ukrainian market include international trademarks such as Marlboro, Chesterfield, L&M, Bond Street, Parliament, Philip Morris, and others.

== Social Responsibility ==
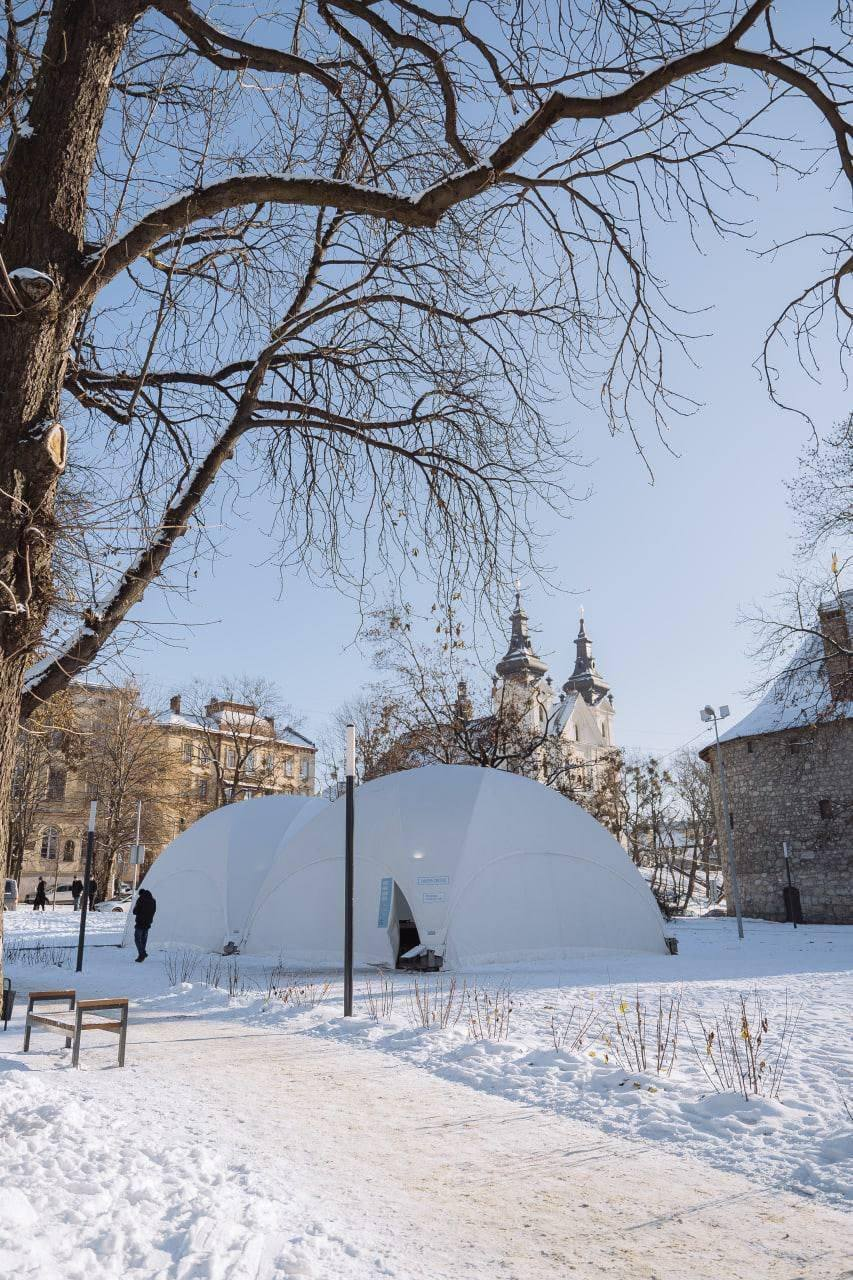
Social space "Spheres of Light"

At the onset of the full-scale Russian invasion of Ukraine, the company helped to evacuate Philip Morris employees from Kharkiv, Kyiv, Chernihiv, and other cities in danger. Altogether, the company evacuated more than 1600 people, including employees with their families and pets.

Philip Morris International parent company has contributed approximately US$10 million for humanitarian needs in Ukraine. These funds were used to purchase 22 ambulance vehicles and an X-ray machine for a hospital in Ivano-Frankivsk, as well as to procure essential supplies for Ukrainians. Philip Morris Ukraine funded two mobile intensive care units for the transportation of critically wounded patients. The company also purchased special resuscitation equipment for a hospital in the Dnipropetrovsk Region.

The company co-sponsored the Feminine Shuttle project — a special diagnostic vehicle for women's medical examinations in de-occupied territories where medical and social infrastructure has been destroyed.

Philip Morris International employees from 80 countries around the world donated over US$550,000 to support Ukrainians as a part of the Project with a Heart charity. Moreover, office employees from Poland, Moldova, Slovakia, Romania, Hungary, and Switzerland provided additional support.

In December 2022, during a period of intensified electricity blackouts, Philip Morris Ukraine, together with DTF Agency, established 5 “Spheres of Light” social spaces (in Kyiv, Odesa and Lviv) equipped with generators, charging stations, and Starlinks.

In 2023, the company procured 13 generators to support communities in de-occupied Kharkiv region.

Philip Morris Ukraine supported the RE: Ukraine Housing project to construct temporary modular housing near Bucha for families that were forced to abandon their homes or lost their housing.

To overcome the consequences of the COVID-19 pandemic, Philip Morris Ukraine donated UAH 10 million to the Health for Everyone Charitable Foundation to procure personal protection equipment for doctors and hospitals.

== Sustainable Development ==
Philip Morris Ukraine cooperates with the Waste Management Center and collects damaged IQOS, lil, pod systems, and electronic e-cigarettes for proper ecological recycling. Accumulator batteries from used devices are recycled in Romania (the GreenWEEE facility specializes in used electric appliances and battery recycling).

In November 2021, the company's Kharkiv facility successfully completed assessment for the AWS (Alliance for Water Stewardship) international water standard.

In 2020, the enterprise reinstated the status of implementing the system of environmental protection legislation according to the ISO 14000 international standard.

In 2019, Philip Morris Ukraine invested more than UAH 8 million to enhance drainage systems at the Kharkiv facility, which allowed for the use of rainwater for industrial needs. Additionally, repeat use water tanks were installed, decreasing the water usage rate from the city systems by 30%, and the water dumping rate by 25 thousand cubic meters per year.

The same year, a solid fuel boiler fueled by sunflower husks was installed. This technology made it possible to switch from natural gas to non-fossil biological solid fuel sources. As a result, CO2 emissions decreased by 11%. Facility equipment upgrades also enabled the repeated use of 91% of industrial waste in the production cycle.

== Illicit Trade Prevention ==
In August 2023, Philip Morris Brands Sarl, which owns tobacco brands in Ukraine, sued for UAH 1.4 million for counterfeiting their Bond trademark cigarettes. A Lviv court delivered a guilty verdict against three members of a criminal group who illegally produced and sold cigarettes under the Philip Morris brand. For the company, this was the first successful court case of its kind in Ukraine.

== Controversies ==
In October 2019, the Antimonopoly Committee of Ukraine imposed a penalty on the largest tobacco product manufacturers, Philip Morris, Japan Tobacco, Imperial Tobacco, British American Tobacco, Prilucky Tobacco Company amounting to UAH 6,5 billion. The Philip Morris penalty share amounted to almost UAH 1.2 billion (Philip Morris Ukraine — UAH 810 million, Philip Morris Sales and Distribution — UAH 370 million).

According to the ACU, cigarette manufacturers’ concerted actions in 2011-2012 reduced the number of direct contracts with other distributors in favor of the Tedis Ukraine distribution company, although in 2011, this company received permission from the ACU for concentration and concerted actions.

In March 2021, the court satisfied the lawsuits` complaints of Philip Morris Ukraine and Philip Morris Sales and Distribution, canceling the imposed penalties.

== Awards ==
The Top Employer Institute recognized Philip Morris as one of the best employers in Ukraine and worldwide throughout 2014–2023.

In 2023, Philip Morris Ukraine was ranked 5th in the "50 Best Wartime Employers" rating according to Forbes and Work.ua online portal.

Also in 2023, Forbes featured Philip Morris Ukraine in the list of top 25 employers for veterans. The same year, the company ranked 3rd in a ranking of the best employers by Delo.ua.

In 2022, Philip Morris Ukraine was featured among the top-companies most attractive to Ukrainian jobseekers, according to research by Ernst & Young.

== See also ==
- Philip Morris International
- IQOS
