= Jacek Olczak =

CEO of Philip Morris International (1965-)

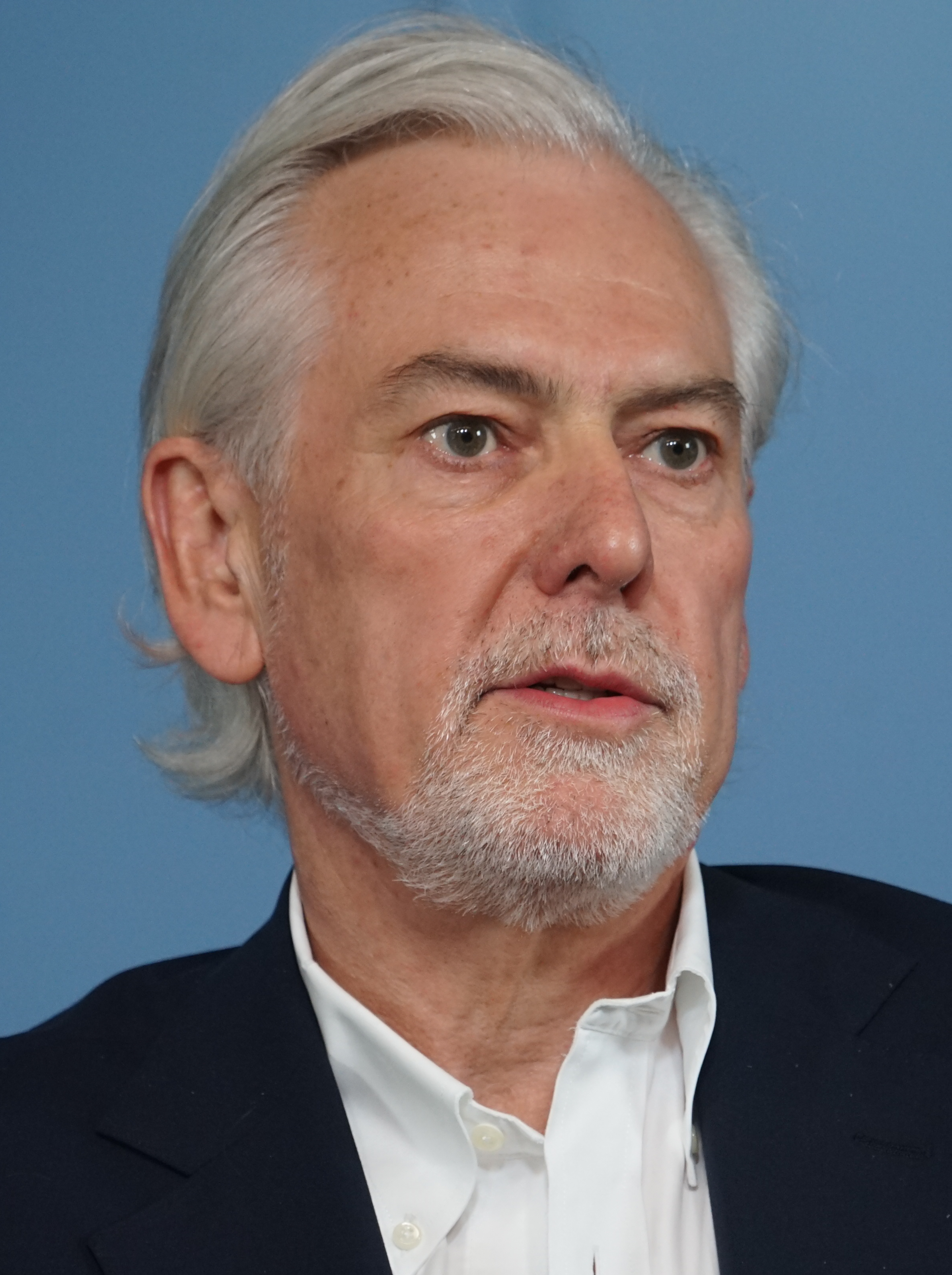
- Olczak in 2025
- Born: Jacek Olczak; 23 January 1965 (age 61); Łódź, Poland
- Education: University of Łódź (Master's degree in economics)
- Title: CEO of Philip Morris International

Jacek Olczak (born 23 January 1965) is a Polish businessman and the chief executive officer (CEO) of Philip Morris International, the largest publicly traded tobacco company in the world. He is the first Pole to take the chair of a global company.

== Early life ==
He earned a graduate degree in economics from the University of Łódź in Poland.

== Career ==
Olczak began his career at BDO in London and Warsaw.

In 1993, he joined the finance department of the Polish branch of the Philip Morris group, then in 1995 he joined the internal controls team in Lausanne, Switzerland. In 1996, he became the director of sales for Philip Morris Polska, then took up the same role at the Romanian branch of the company from 1999. Over the years that followed, he held leadership or management positions for operations in several central European divisions, notably in the Baltics, in Hungary (whose supervisory board he became a member of in 2006), as well as in Germany and Austria (which he joined the leadership of in 2006).

In 2009, he was appointed as president for the European Union market region at Philip Morris International. He then became the group chief financial officer (CFO) in 2012, then the chief operating officer (COO) in 2018. In December 2020, the company announced the retirement of executive chairman Louis Camilleri, to be replaced by outgoing CEO André Calantzopoulos. Olczak became CEO at the following shareholders' meeting in May 2021.

As the CFO of Philip Morris International, his total salary averaged around US$7 million annually between 2012 and 2018, reaching 11 million as COO in 2020. Olczak lives near Lausanne and has four children.
