= Tobacco (Last Week Tonight with John Oliver) =

HBO news satire television episode

- Last Week Tonight with John Oliver segment
- Episode no.: Season 2 Episode 2 (segment)
- Presented by: John Oliver
- Original air date: February 15, 2015
- Running time: 18 minutes

"Tobacco" is a segment of the HBO news satire television series Last Week Tonight with John Oliver about the tobacco industry. It first aired on February 15, 2015, as part of the second episode of the series' second season. During the eighteen-minute segment, comedian John Oliver discusses tobacco industry trends and practices.

Toward the end of the segment, Oliver introduces Jeff the Diseased Lung, a mascot he created for the American global cigarette and tobacco company Philip Morris International, the makers of Marlboro cigarettes. The anthropomorphic diseased lung, who smokes and coughs, has been compared to Joe Camel and the Marlboro Man. Oliver and his team promoted the cartoon character by sending shirts with Jeff's image to Togo and displaying billboards in Uruguay, and by encouraging use of the hashtag #JeffWeCan, which trended on Twitter following the broadcast.

After the segment, Philip Morris issued a response that received some criticism. The "Tobacco" segment received widespread media coverage, with several outlets praising Oliver's ability to launch successful marketing campaigns and change perceptions about smoking through the creation of the mascot. The Jeff caricature was later used at a May 2015 protest organized by the Campaign for Tobacco-Free Kids in New York City.

== Description ==
External videos
- Last Week Tonight with John Oliver: Season 2 Episode 26 on HBO
- Last Week Tonight with John Oliver: Tobacco (HBO) on YouTube

"Tobacco", an eighteen-minute segment about the tobacco industry, was delivered by John Oliver on February 15, 2015, during the second episode of Last Week Tonight's second season. Oliver introduces the topic of tobacco smoking by showing video clips of "trusted newsmen, cartoon characters, and cowboys in TV commercials" who are smoking cigarettes. He says that the cowboy in the clip is Marlboro Man, a figure used in advertising campaigns for Marlboro cigarettes, and notes that four of the actors portraying Marlboro Man have died from lung cancer or smoking-related illnesses. Oliver says that cigarette smoking is no longer as prevalent in the United States because of, among other things, mandatory warnings on all cigarette boxes and a ban on TV advertisements for cigarettes. The comedian says that tobacco executives adamantly refused to acknowledge the potential drawbacks to smoking, despite strong evidence to prove these drawbacks. He shows a video of Joseph Cullman, the former CEO of the tobacco company Philip Morris International (PMI), saying that "some women would prefer having smaller babies" in response to a reporter's comment that pregnant women who smoke will give birth to smaller babies as a result. Even so, the restrictions on smoking advertisements contributed to a decline in smoking rates among American adults, as only 18% of adults smoked in 2014, compared to 43% of adults in 1965.

Oliver then shows a clip of a tobacco farmer saying, "This is the best time ever to be a tobacco farmer." The comedian says that while American smoking rates have gone down, smoking rates in the rest of the world have gone up. He displays a viral video of a chain smoking baby in Indonesia who reportedly threw tantrums when he did not get to smoke. Oliver then states that the baby's favorite brand of cigarettes is owned by PMI, one of the tobacco companies that has "flocked" Indonesia and contributed to its smoking epidemic. He cites the World Health Organization's report on the prevalence of tobacco consumption, which stated that 67% of Indonesian males smoked in 2013. and shows an ABC News video of Indonesian schoolboys lighting cigarettes at a kiosk outside their school. He also says that PMI, by its own count, sells "seven of the world's top 15 international brands" of tobacco, including Marlboro.

Afterward, Oliver tells his viewers about tobacco companies' worldwide actions to "attack laws intended to protect public health". One of these laws was in Australia, where the federal government replaced all branding on tobacco boxes with "plain packaging" photographs that showed the effects of smoking, including "the toe tag on the corpse, the cancerous mouth, the nightmarish eyeball, [and] the diseased lung". He references the Department of Health, which states that smoking consumption had declined to historically low levels after the law was passed. Following the passage of this legislation, British American Tobacco and Japan Tobacco unsuccessfully sued the Australian federal government in the High Court of Australia and, in the process, were forced to pay the government's legal fees. PMI then transferred the ownership of its Australian division to one of its other businesses located in Hong Kong, taking advantage of a treaty that prevented Australia from seizing the property of businesses located in Hong Kong. PMI Hong Kong then sued Australia's government in international court, claiming that Australia was stealing the brands on its boxes by adding the photographs of the effects of smoking. (PMI would lose this lawsuit as well in July 2017.)

Oliver says that Ukraine, Honduras, and the Dominican Republic had also filed complaints with the World Trade Organization over Australia's tobacco-box law. He points out that according to Ukrainian MP Lesya Orobets, Ukraine and Australia did not trade any tobacco products with each other, so Ukraine's complaint was unwarranted. The comedian says that according to Bloomberg.com, these nations' complaints to the WTO have been funded by PMI, British American, and other tobacco companies.

Oliver next describes tobacco companies' lawsuits against smaller nations. He says that PMI has sued Uruguay for including obligatory health warnings on tobacco boxes, and that Uruguay's legal fees had become so costly that the billionaire Michael Bloomberg donated $500,000 to help pay these fees. According to the International Tobacco Control Project, the law helped reduce smoking rates between 2006 and 2012, and the rate of smokers who supported federal regulation of smoking had also risen. Additionally, PMI had also sued Togo, which had mandated that each tobacco box sold in the country contain health warnings written in French, a language many of the nations' residents did not read. Oliver compares PMI's US$80 billion revenue in 2013 to Togo's $4.3 billion GDP during the same year. He then reads a cease-and-desist letter from PMI to the Togolese government and says that PMI had cherry-picked a quote from the one dissenting judge in the Australia lawsuit who had ruled in favor of the tobacco industry. The comedian states that British American and its affiliates had sent similar letters to the governments of Namibia and the Solomon Islands.

=== Jeff the Diseased Lung ===
Jeff the Diseased Lung
- Created by: John Oliver

In-universe information
- Full name: Jeff the Diseased Lung in a Cowboy Hat
- Occupation: Cowboy

Toward the end of the segment, Oliver offers the mascot Jeff the Diseased Lung for Philip Morris International's use, free of charge. Jeff, whose full name is "Jeff the Diseased Lung in a Cowboy Hat", is a fictional anthropomorphic cartoon character who smokes and coughs. He has been compared to the Marlboro Man and described as Oliver's version of Joe Camel.

Jeff has been described as a "cartoon-like, diseased lung cowboy created by crossing the diseased lung pictured on cigarette packs in Australia with the Marlboro Man". Similarly, Rolling Stone's Daniel Kreps said Jeff helps to "bridge the gap between the Marlboro Man ... and a 'lung that looks like you're breathing through baked ziti'". Alicia Lu of Bustle wrote:

Sure, he may be an anthropomorphic lung that's decaying from being exposed to years of cigarette smoke, which might not be Big Tobacco's first choice for branding, but he's a cowboy. Look at his regal cowboy hat, his spiffy red cowboy boots, and the way that cigarette nonchalantly dangles from his lips – doesn't Jeff remind you of a figure from days of yore? If you squint, I swear you'll see the Marlboro Man.

Oliver and his team promoted the character by sending shirts with his image to Togo and displaying billboards with his likeness in Uruguay. During the segment, Oliver encouraged viewers to use the hashtag "#JeffWeCan", which later trended on Twitter. He also called on viewers to upload images of the mascot to Google+ accounts so Jeff would be displayed on Google Images searches for "Marlboro". A live version of Jeff appears at the end of the "Tobacco" segment. Sarene Leeds of The Wall Street Journal called Jeff's appearance "a full-on Disneyland-ish nightmare" and wrote: "there is nothing more disturbing – or awesome – that you will see today than the sight of John Oliver dancing around a guy dressed up as a smoking, infected lung surrounded by more than a dozen children". After the segment, the HBO Shop started selling T-shirts that depicted the mascot.

A performer in a Jeff costume appeared at Kick Butts Day, a protest organized by the Campaign for Tobacco-Free Kids and youth advocates, which was held outside Philip Morris' annual shareholders' meeting in New York City on May 6, 2015. The protests featured a flash mob with fifty dancers performing a choreographed dance to a song with the lyrics, "We don't want your cigarettes. Jeff we can!" The performance ended with the mascot: "rolling around on the floor in a coughing fit and loss of breath". Shana Narula, the campaign's coordinator, said:

The whole concept is to use Jeff and the hashtag #JeffWeCan and #StopMarlboro to show that these marketing tactics are not allowed and tobacco is still the leading cause of preventable disease and death in the world. And the fact is it's the only consumer product that when used as intended, it kills its user. This is very, very unique — no other consumer product does this. Most people think that tobacco is not really an issue in this country anymore and that's completely not true. That's what we want to shed light on today, in a fashion where people will take notice.

== Reception ==
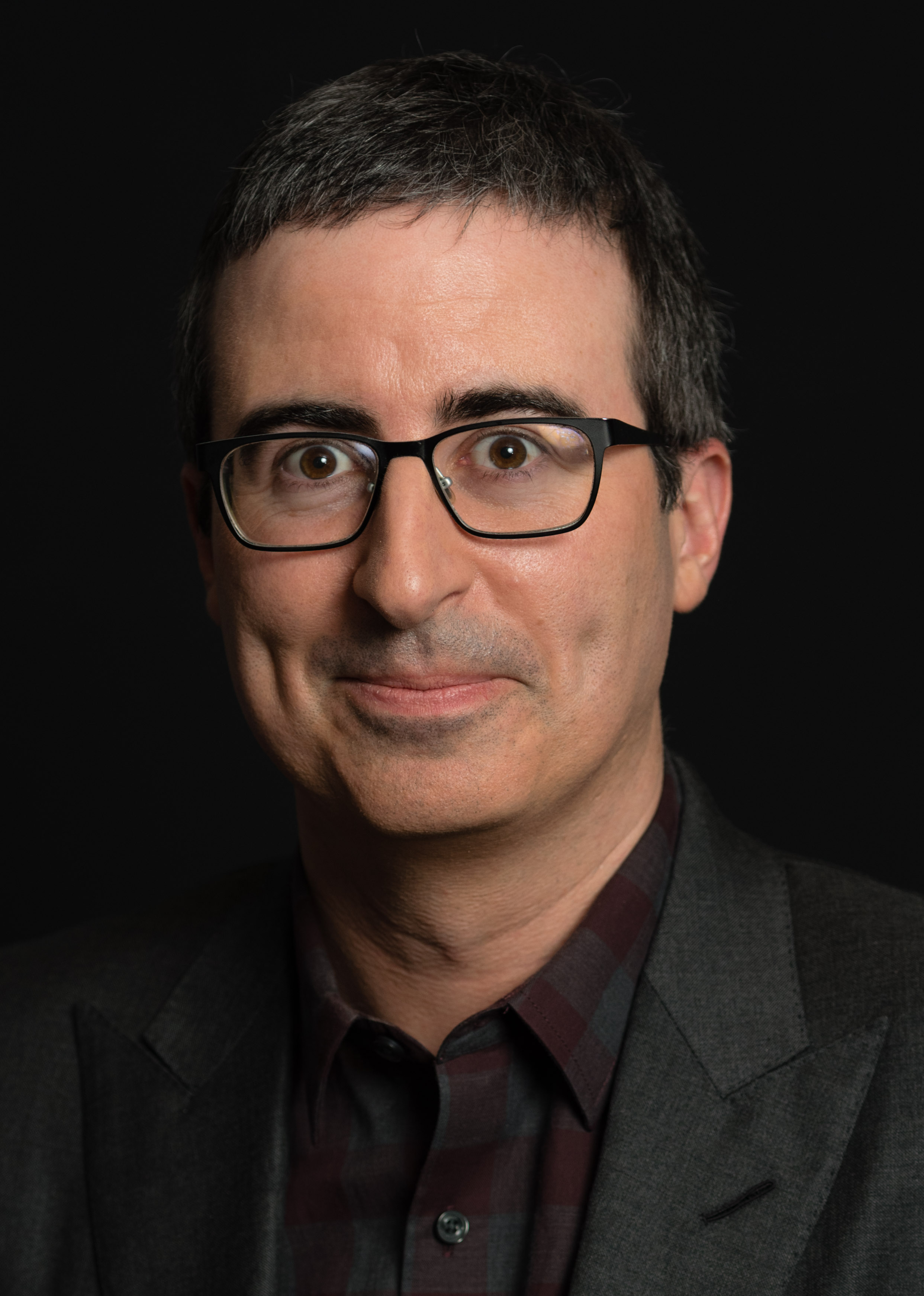
John Oliver (pictured in 2016) was praised for his ability to market the mascot Jeff the Diseased Lung.

By the morning of February 16, the "Tobacco" segment had been viewed more than two million times. The segment received widespread media coverage, with several outlets praising Oliver's ability to launch successful marketing campaigns and "alter perceptions about smoking" through the creation of the mascot Jeff. Her Campus's Kelly Tierney noted the enthusiasm displayed by Oliver's fans during the segment and wrote:

While John Oliver simply considers himself a comedian, it is apparent that he is doing much more than comedy. He informs us of real issues we otherwise wouldn't hear or think deeply about, which in and of itself is brilliant, but what really sets him apart is his way of calling his audience to action about these issues. He shows us that there really is something we can do and helps us to see how we can enact change.

MediaPost Communications' Marketing Daily published an article called "What Marketers Can Learn from John Oliver", in which James G. Brooks, Jr. complimented Oliver's ability to encourage audience participation. He wrote, "Jeff trended worldwide. This kind of reaction is ideal for any marketing campaign." Alex Frail of The Massachusetts Daily Collegian said, "One of his funnier bits, Jeff the Diseased Lung, took aim at the tobacco industry; landed on cigarette packs throughout Australia and on billboards throughout Uruguay; and delivered t-shirts to Togo. The power to spark a movement like Jeff the Diseased Lung isn't shared by Oliver's contemporaries." Jeffrey Wasserman, vice president and director of RAND Health, opined: "John Oliver's 'Jeff' character is of course a mockery of an iconic figure, the Marlboro Man, whose legacy turned out to be cruelly ironic. As Oliver noted in his show, four former Marlboro men died of smoking-related causes. Let's hope that 'Jeff' going viral causes current and prospective smokers—mainly teens and preteens—to recognize cigarette smoking for what it is: the most deadly habit."

In July 2015, Slant Magazine's Julia Pressman describes the "Tobacco" segment in her article "The British Dude Who Is Winning America's War on Bullshit", in which she features five ways Oliver "has owned 2015 thus far". The website Inverse included the February 15 segment, the second most effective from the show's second season, saying it "may be the most lasting of the entire year". Furthermore, the website's Matthew Strauss wrote, "Jeff shows up when you Google Image-search 'Marlboro'; he's on bus stops in Uruguay; and he's on t-shirts in Togo. Jeff is an icon. Oliver hasn't taken down Big Tobacco, but he sure didn't make them look too good." In August, the Los Angeles Times named Oliver, and costume designer Mikaela Wohl, winners in the "Costume designer's quietest cry for help" category for the paper's 2015 Envy Awards, a parody of the annual Emmy Awards. Randee Dawn complimented both for their hard work and humor, but said Wohl's work on "amazing" costumes, such as Jeff and Russian Space Sex Gecko, distracted her from using her "creative energies" for dressing Oliver.

=== Response by Philip Morris International ===
Philip Morris International issued a statement which read in part:

On February 15, 2015, the 'Last Week Tonight with John Oliver' show dedicated a significant portion of its program to our company [...] Last Week Tonight with John Oliver is a parody show, known for getting a laugh through exaggeration and presenting partial views in the name of humor. The segment includes many mischaracterizations of our company, including our approach to marketing and regulation, which have been embellished in the spirit of comedic license [...] While we recognize the tobacco industry is an easy target for comedians, we take seriously the responsibility that comes with selling a product that is an adult choice and is harmful to health [...] We support and comply with thousands of regulations worldwide – including advertising restrictions, penalties for selling tobacco products to minors, and substantial health warnings on packaging. We're investing billions into developing and scientifically assessing a portfolio of products that have the potential to be less harmful and that are satisfying so smokers will switch to them. And, like any other company with a responsibility to its business partners, shareholders and employees, we ask only that laws protecting investments, including trademarks, be equally applied to us.

The statement also provided readers with a "balanced view", and facts about the issues raised by Oliver, including the company's marketing practices and "approach to regulation". Philip Morris included links to its "Be Marlboro" campaign, which is "aimed at competing for existing adult smoker market share", reasons why the company is challenging Australia and Uruguay's censorship of its trademarks, and "facts about smoking prevalence in Australia after the introduction of plain packaging".

Chris Morran of Consumerist said Philip Morris did a "really poor job of trying to defend its actions". He wrote, "[...] this should be where the very serious folks at Philip Morris go point by point and explain where Oliver exaggerated and embellished, but they don't. It's a classic non-response in which the accused tried to undercut the accuser's argument by claiming he can't possibly be providing the truth." He noted that Philip Morris does not deny making legal threats to suppress regulations on cigarette packaging and questions how the company: "[expects] to be taken seriously when it readily admits that the products it sells are 'harmful to health'". Furthermore, Chris Morran takes aim at the company's claim that it "[supports] and [complies] with thousands of regulations worldwide", writing:

[...] the tobacco industry doesn't support these regulations. It only supports the ones it can't fight in a courtroom. Once it loses a battle – or realizes a battle can't be won – then suddenly Big Tobacco, just like every other heavily regulated industry, claims to support and abide by the rules.

Finally, he said of the statement's final sentence: "That's honestly the best Philip Morris and Big Tobacco can come up with – We've spent a lot of money and have a lot of investors so please don't mess with our packaging because it might cause us to earn smaller profits [...] It's an argument that might be tenable if cigarettes did anything other than poison the people who buy them – or live in the same house with them."

== See also ==
- Cigarette packets in Australia
- Prevalence of tobacco consumption
- Tobacco in the United States
- Tobacco marketing targeting African Americans
- Tobacco packaging warning messages
- Usage of electronic cigarettes
