= Bond Street (cigarette) =

Philip Morris International brand

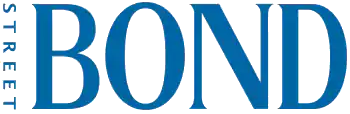

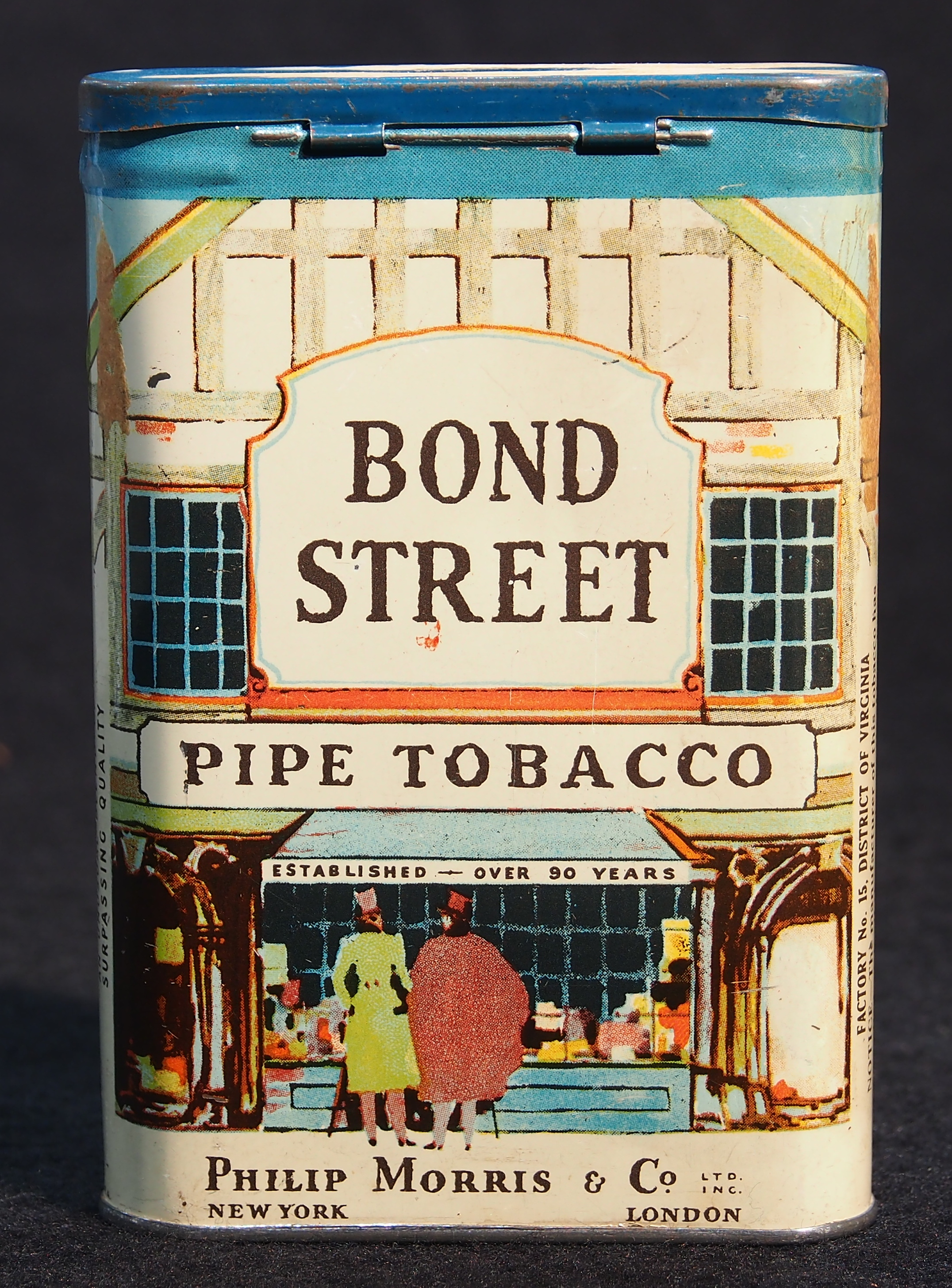
- Bond Street old pipe tobacco tin
- Product type: Cigarette
- Current owner: Philip Morris International
- Produced by: Philip Morris International
- Introduced: 1902; 124 years ago
- Markets: See below

Bond Street is an international non-US brand of cigarettes produced by Philip Morris International.

== History ==
Formerly called Old Bond Street, this brand's history goes back to 1902. Philip Morris, the founder of the company, had a boutique on Bond Street in London. And 1902 was the year when one of the greatest admirers of the company, King Albert of Belgium, presented the boutique with the title of the Royal Tobacconist.

In the mid-1990s, there was a process of re-branding. In 2006 a "premium" version, Bond Street Special was launched.

The brand is not available in the United Kingdom, despite the fact that it is named after a street in London.

In 2016, it was the fifth-largest international brand, with a volume of 45 billion cigarettes.

== Controversy ==
In September 2012, Australia's Department of Health wrote to Philip Morris warning the new plain packaging of its Bond Street cigarettes may break the country's plain tobacco packaging laws, saying the packaging only "heavily resembles the plain packaging requirements".

"We note that if these products are sold, offered for sale or otherwise supplied after 1 December 2012 the packaging would not be compliant with the Act. The breach of the act could expose the company to massive fines of up to $1.1 million". The department took issue with the use of the word "cigarettes" in small type on the side of the packet, saying the outer surfaces of the packet must have a matt finish and warned the pack may not be the correct colour — Pantone 448C.

The department referred the health warnings contained on the pack to the Australian Competition & Consumer Commission to see if they complied with regulations.

== Markets ==
Bond Street are sold in the following countries: United States, Argentina, Sweden, Finland, The Netherlands, Italy, Poland, Hungarian People's Republic, Hungary, Czech Republic, Moldova, Slovakia, Slovenia, Bosnia and Herzegovina, Serbia, Estonia, Ukraine, Russia, Kazakhstan, Armenia, Sierra Leone, Togo, Israel, Malaysia, Australia and New Zealand.
