= Philip Morris (cigarette) =

American cigarette brand

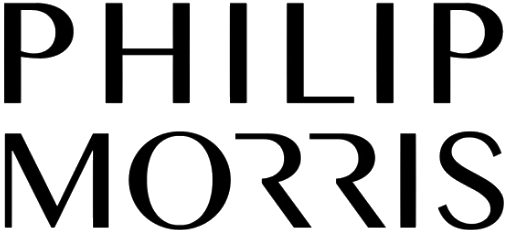
- Product type: Cigarette
- Current owner: Philip Morris International
- Produced by: Philip Morris International
- Country: United States
- Introduced: 1847; 179 years ago
- Markets: See Markets
- Tagline: "Call for Philip Morris!", "Have a Commander, welcome aboard"

Philip Morris is an American brand of cigarettes, currently owned by Philip Morris International. It is manufactured by the firm worldwide except in the US, where Philip Morris USA produces it.

== History ==
Philip Morris’ eponymous brand was first made in England, it was introduced to the United States in 1847. Philip Morris incorporated in New York in 1902; until 1929, when the company purchased its first cigarette factory in Richmond, Virginia, their brands were made under license by Stephano Brothers of Philadelphia.

Philip Morris English Blend was introduced as a non-filter, regular-size (70 mm) brand in 1933 by Philip Morris USA. To advertise the brand, Philip Morris hired 3-foot, 11-inch tall bellboy Johnny Roventini as their pitchman; through the 1950s on radio, television, and in print advertisements, Johnny would shout out the famous slogan: "Call for Philip Morris!" Also known as Johnny Philip Morris, Roventini essentially became a living trade mark.

The name of Philip Morris English Blend was changed to Philip Morris Special Blend in 1948. In the 1950s, the brand was the sponsor of C.B.S. television’s I Love Lucy show; when it was originally broadcast, the show’s credits would appear over a package of Philip Morris cigarettes. When ”I Love Lucy” was packaged for syndication, images of Philip Morris were replaced with the now-familiar heart on satin seen in the end-credits, though the original images have been restored as an extra for the D.V.D. box-sets of the series.

Philip Morris was introduced in king-size (85 mm) and queen-size (100 mm) in 1953, in filter 85s, non-filter and menthol-flavored filter 100s; the latter was renamed Commanders in 1960. The brown packaging of Philip Morris was first changed in 1955. The filter varieties were relaunched in 1963 (as Multifilter, featuring a charcoal filter) and 1966 (in Menthol); uniquely, they were both sold in plastic boxes. The non-filtered versions of Philip Morris are still made today by its parent company.

The brand is still made and sold by Altria in Argentina, the European Union, Japan, and Uruguay. In Canada, Philip Morris was originally made by the Tuckett Tobacco Company, which had bought out Philip Morris' Canadian subsidiary early in the twentieth century. Tuckett itself was bought by Imperial Tobacco Canada in 1930, although it continued manufacturing until 1966, when Imperial shut down the Tuckett factory and took over its brands. The last survivor in Canada of the Philip Morris brand, the king-sized, plain-end version, was discontinued in the early 1990s.

Nowadays the brand is the 15th best selling international brand and Philip Morris' sixth largest international brand, with a volume of 36 billion cigarettes sold in 2016, and the brand is sold in over 40 countries worldwide.

== Advertising ==
In 1955, Philip Morris sales were at their lowest point- even “I Love Lucy” wasn't selling them as fast as they wanted the public to smoke them (that's why they dropped their sponsorship of Lucy's program that June). They discovered they needed to change their advertising approach. In Vance Packard "The Hidden Persuaders" (1957), it was revealed that Philip Morris conducted a survey in mid-1955 to find out why people weren't buying them.

Participants were asked to complete this sentence: "When I think of Philip Morris, I think of __________." The majority of them answered, "irritation". This was because in previous advertising campaigns, Philip Morris stressed their brand was "entirely free of a source of irritation found in the manufacture of all other leading cigarettes"- and people remembered that even when they abandoned that claim after 1953. It was decided they would project a more "positive" approach- and a different pack replaced the brown one that had been used for at least 40 years.

They also retired Johnny Roventini, their famous "Call for Philip Morris!" bellhop, who had been central to their ad campaigns since 1933. By the end of 1955, Philip Morris introduced a white pack with stripes and a new logo, and stressed the word "gentleness" in their advertising. It worked: according to Packard, first-quarter sales in 1956 were up 26% over the previous year. And Philip Morris continued to use this approach, emphasizing "young smokers", "mildness" and a preference for cigarettes "without filters" towards the end of the 1950s (Liggett & Myers also stressed "If you like a mild smoke, but you don't like filters, join the 'Chesterfield People'---get Chesterfield King!" in their 1965 ad campaign).

By 1958, however, they revived "old memories" of Johnny, "Call for Philip Morris!", and "On the Trail" (from Ferde Grofé's Grand Canyon Suite, used as their musical signature on radio and TV for 22 years) in their ads. Veteran actor/announcer Michael Rye was the announcer heard in the 1959 ads.

In 1960, they altered their "King Size" brand into "Philip Morris Commander". Again, they "rewrapped" the pack a bit, and stressed a "nautical" theme in their advertising.

Douglas Edwards and the News, CBS' early evening 15 minute newscast [7pm(et) in most areas, with a 7:15pm "feed" in others], was sponsored on alternate evenings by Philip Morris, who continued to be a regular sponsor after Walter Cronkite succeeded Douglas Edwards in April 1962.

Over the years, Philip Morris USA made many poster and television ads to promote the Philip Morris and Commander brand, starting from 1933 and ending in 1966, when the brand started to lose appeal.

A special thermometer depicting Marlboro at the top and Philip Morris at the bottom, as well as a Philip Morris Commander lighter were also made.

=== Marketing to the black community ===
Historian Keith Wailoo argues the cigarette industry targeted a new market in the black audience starting in the 1960s. It took advantage of several converging trends. First was the increased national attention on the dangers of lung cancer. Cigarette companies took the initiative in fighting back. They developed menthol-flavored brands like Kool, which seemed to be more soothing to the throat, and advertised these as good for your health. A second trend was the Federal ban on tobacco advertising on radio and television. There was no ban on advertising in the print media, so the industry responded by large scale advertising in Black newspapers and magazines. They erected billboards in inner city neighborhoods. The third trend was the Civil rights movement of the 1960s. Big Tobacco responded by investing heavily in the Civil Rights Movement, winning the gratitude of many national and local leaders. Menthol flavored cigarette brands systematically sponsored local events in the black community, and subsidized major black organizations especially the NAACP (National Association for the Advancement of Colored People). They also subsidized many churches and schools. The marketing initiative was a success as the rate of smoking in the black community grew, while it declined among whites, furthermore three out of four black smokers purchased menthol cigarettes.

== Markets ==
Philip Morris was or still is sold in the following countries: Canada, United States, Mexico, Chile, Uruguay, Argentina, Romania, Luxembourg, Netherlands, Germany, Sweden, Finland, France, Switzerland, Austria, Portugal, Spain, Italy, Hungary, Czech Republic, Slovenia, Slovakia, Croatia, Greece, Cyprus, Estonia, Latvia, Lithuania, Ukraine, Russia, Georgia, Philippines, Hong Kong, Japan, Australia, Algeria, and Indonesia.

== In Italy ==
In June 2015, the brand changed its name and look from Diana to Philip Morris.

== See also ==
- Cigarette
- Tobacco smoking
