= André Calantzopoulos =

Greek businessman

André Calantzopoulos (born 1957) is a Greek businessman. He is executive chairman of tobacco giant Philip Morris International (PMI), having previously been CEO. He worked as a design engineer in the automotive industry before joining PMI at 28 years old.

== Early life ==
He was born and raised in Pyrgos, Greece. At 18, he moved to Lausanne, Switzerland, to further his education at EPFL.

== Education ==
Calantzopoulos studied electrical engineering at the Ecole Polytechnique Fédérale de Lausanne (the Swiss Federal Institute of Technology), Lausanne. He then went to work in robotics, in the electronics field. Some years later Calantzopoulos returned to education, getting an MBA from the Institut Europeen d’Administration des Affaires (the European Institute of Business Administration, INSEAD, in Paris, France).

== Philip Morris International ==
In 1985, Calantzopoulos started working at Philip Morris International (PMI) as a business development analyst in the Business Development Department. Two years later, he moved over to the Area Operations Department. Since then he has worked in a variety of high executive positions at the firm – throughout central Europe – including: managing director of PM Poland, general manager of Philip Morris Finland, area director of Central Europe, area director of Hungary & Central Europe South and president of the Eastern European region. As general manager for the firm in Czechoslovakia, in 1992, Calantzopoulos played a principal role in PMI's acquisition of Tabak a. s., and as area director of Poland & Hungary, in the firm's procurement of ZPT, a Kraków local tobacco company.

In 1999, Calantzopoulos became president of the firm's Eastern European region. Three years later he was promoted to president of the whole company. On March 28, 2008, he was appointed to the role of chief operating officer when PMI was established as a separate entity. On May 8, 2013, Calantzopoulos became chief executive officer. He also currently sits on the company's board of directors.

He has been described by Louis C. Camilleri as having "an intellect, many, many cannot reach…He has a capacity for work, which is unbelievable. He has an incredible knowledge of the industry. He’s ambitious and he has got a heart". According to statistics from Soulati Media, "PMI has doubled earnings every 10 years since André Calantzopoulos, CEO, joined the firm in 1985, and investors have earned 122% since the spinoff in 2008, compared with 67% for the S&P 500 index."

In December 2020, Philip Morris International announced that its chairman Louis Camilleri would be stepping down, to be replaced by Calantzopoulos.

== Company shares ==
The first share sales transaction Calantzopoulos had in 2014 was on May 12 when he sold 40,000 PMI shares for $3,443,088, an average of $86.08 each. Prior to this sale, the CEO of PMI sold 30,000 shares for $2.8 million, an average of $93.15 each on Feb 12, 2013. His current status for PMI shares is 695,370, representing a less than 1 percent stake in the company.

== Board positions ==
Calantzopoulos was on the SMPM AB International board of directors – a joint venture between Swedish Match and PMI before its dissolution. In addition, he is on the American European Community Association (AECA) advisory board.
