= Fabriques de tabac réunies =

Swiss cigarette manufacturer

- Trade name: Philip Morris Products S.A. (from 2001)
- Industry: Tobacco
- Founded: 1925
- Headquarters: Neuchâtel (Serrières), Switzerland
- Products: Cigarettes
- Brands: Brunette; Marlboro (under license)
- Number of employees: More than 400 (Neuchâtel factory)
- Parent: Philip Morris International
- Website: pmi.com/markets/switzerland

Fabriques de tabac réunies (FTR; German: Vereinigte Tabakfabriken) is a Swiss cigarette manufacturer, founded in Solothurn in 1925 through the merger of family firms. It moved its head office and production to Neuchâtel in 1942. From 1957 it produced Marlboro cigarettes under license, and in 1963 it was bought by Philip Morris Inc.

== History ==
FTR was founded in Solothurn in 1925 through the merger of family firms, with a share capital of 1.2 million francs. The origins of the two main firms, F. Schürch & Cie in Solothurn and E. Schönholzer & Cie in Steffisburg, go back to the 1820s. FTR moved from a diversified production to the exclusive manufacture of cigarettes, with the Brunette brand in 1928. Directed by Fritz Schürch-Sieburg, a key figure in the Swiss Association of Cigarette Manufacturers (Association suisse des fabricants de cigarettes) founded in 1933, FTR played an important role in the far-reaching cartelization and concentration of the industry. Between 1939 and 1956 it bought Athanasiou, Batschari, Orienta, Virginia Tobacco, Madehn, and Memphis.

In 1942 the head office and production were moved to Serrières in Neuchâtel, as the city and the canton granted substantial tax advantages. Strong postwar growth accelerated from 1957 with the licensed production of the Marlboro brand, which was the first contract in Europe for Philip Morris Inc. of New York. In 1963 Philip Morris Inc. bought FTR and pursued a steady policy of investment in automation and in research and development.

The workforce grew from 150 in 1941 to 1,500 in 1980 and numbered 1,200 at the turn of the 21st century, making the company one of the largest private employers and taxpayers in the canton. The Philip Morris holding company, one of the world's three largest multinationals in cigarettes and food, was renamed Altria Group in 2002.

== Bibliography ==
- La Tabatière (company magazine), 1960–
