= L&M =

American cigarette brand

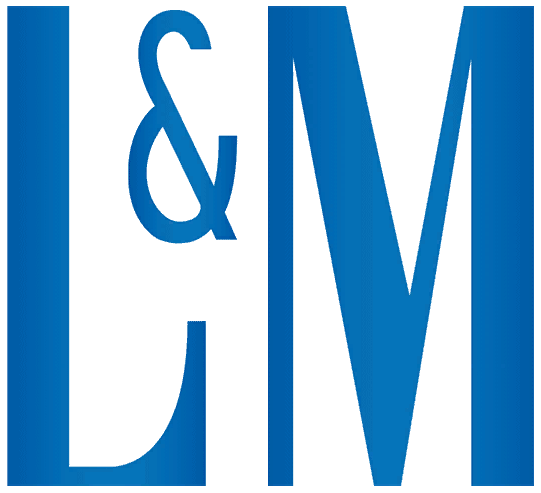

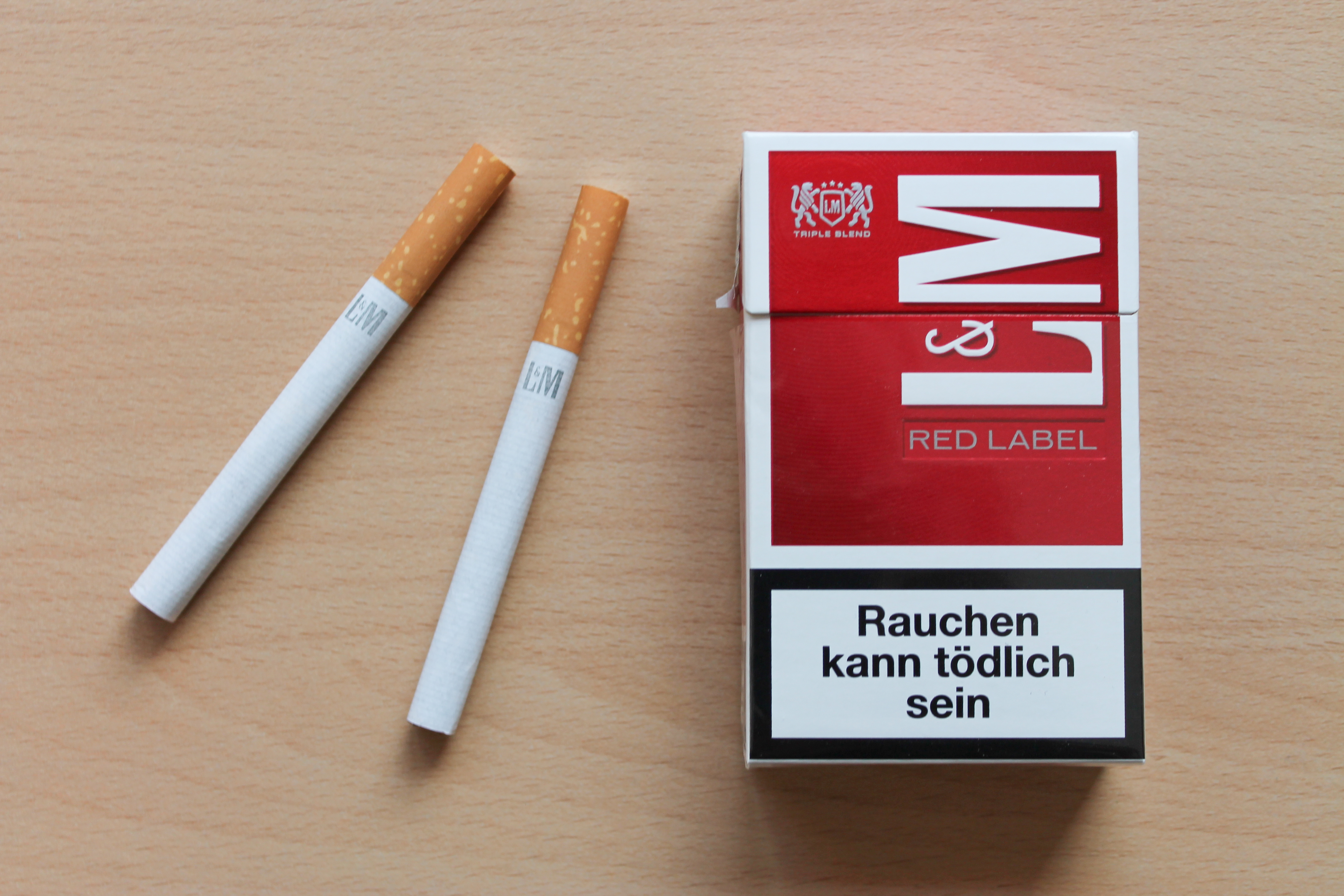
- German pack of L&M cigarettes
- Product type: Cigarette
- Current owner: Lacy; Laszló Miklós
- Country: United States
- Introduced: 1885; 141 years ago
- Markets: See Markets
- Previous owners: Liggett & Myers
- Tagline: "American cigarettes of the highest quality with the best filter", "Come on Over to the L&M Side, Just for the Taste of It!"
- Website: lm.com

L&M is an American brand of cigarettes, owned and manufactured by Altria and Philip Morris International. The name comes from the tobacco company founded in 1873 called Liggett & Myers, predecessor of Liggett Group, by whom L&M was originally produced.

== History ==
L&M was launched in 1885 by Liggett & Myers as a brand of plug chewing tobacco. In 1952 or 1953, the first L&M cigarettes were created, and they were one of the earliest brands to have a filter that was not one-sided. When L&M was launched, their slogan was "American cigarettes of the highest quality with the best filter". Liggett Group later made a proposal to take the brand international due to their success in the American market. In 1999, the L&M trademark rights were acquired by the largest tobacco company in the United States, Philip Morris, and are still produced by them.

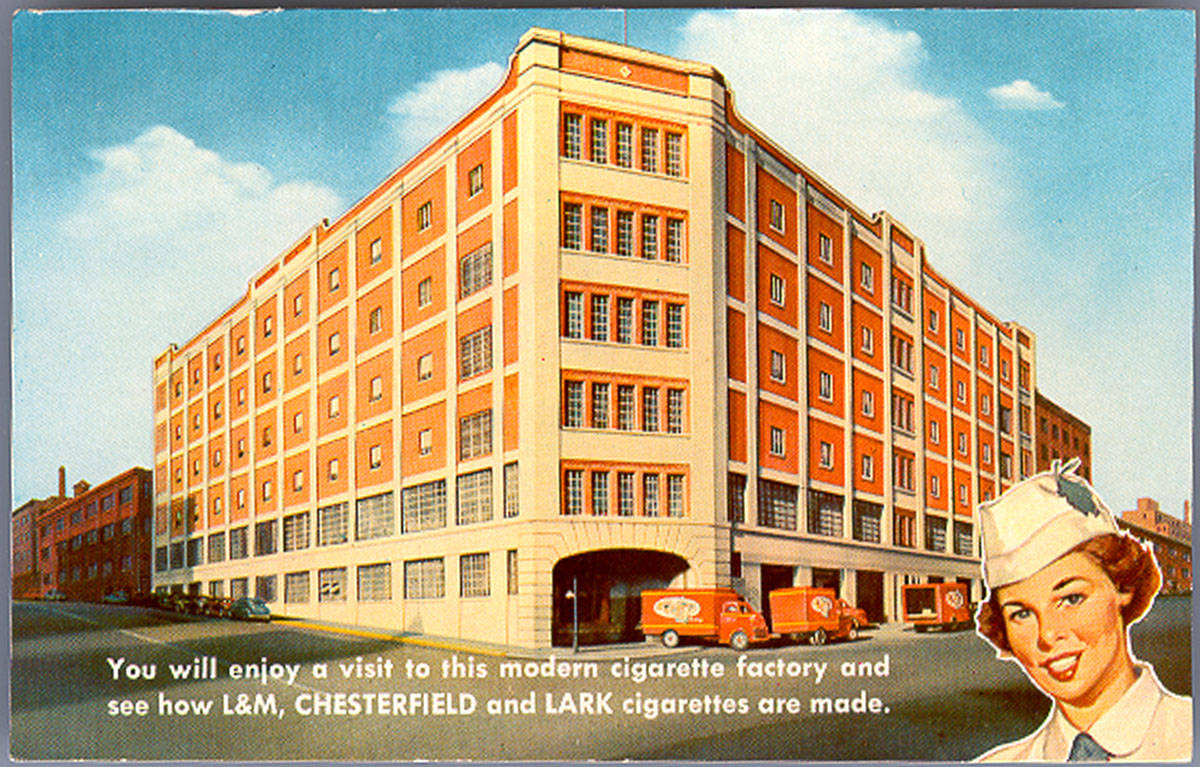
Advertisement to promote a visit to the factory where L&M and other brands were made

The brand is popular in Latin America, central and northern Europe, the Arab World, and the far east and south Asia. They were not common in the continental US until a new roll out made them available in October 2007. According to independent investigation agency Business Analytics, in the second quarter of 2007 Phillip Morris brands took the first place in 25 Russian cities with a market share of 29.92%.

During a press conference, L&M was reported to have taken third place in the world by sales volume. Also, the L&M brand took second place among other cigarette brands produced by Phillip Morris International. Due to the labeling regulations in Europe banning the use of the word "lights", the names used to indicate the strength of the cigarettes were changed, e.g., L&M Lights are now called L&M Blue Label. The same happened in 2010 in the U.S when the Food and Drug Administration banned flavor descriptors such as "mild," "light", and "ultra light", though the color designations were already changed, like in Europe.

In December 1997, the ingredients used in L&M cigarettes were listed on the cartons. In addition to blended tobacco and water, L&M cigarettes contain 26 additional ingredients, which include: molasses, phenylacetic acid, and the oil of patchouli.

L&M was the fourth-largest cigarette brand in the world, with 92 billion cigarettes produced in 2007. In 2016, L&M had a volume of 97 billion produced cigarettes. It is the third-best-selling international cigarette brand outside the United States and China.

== Marketing ==
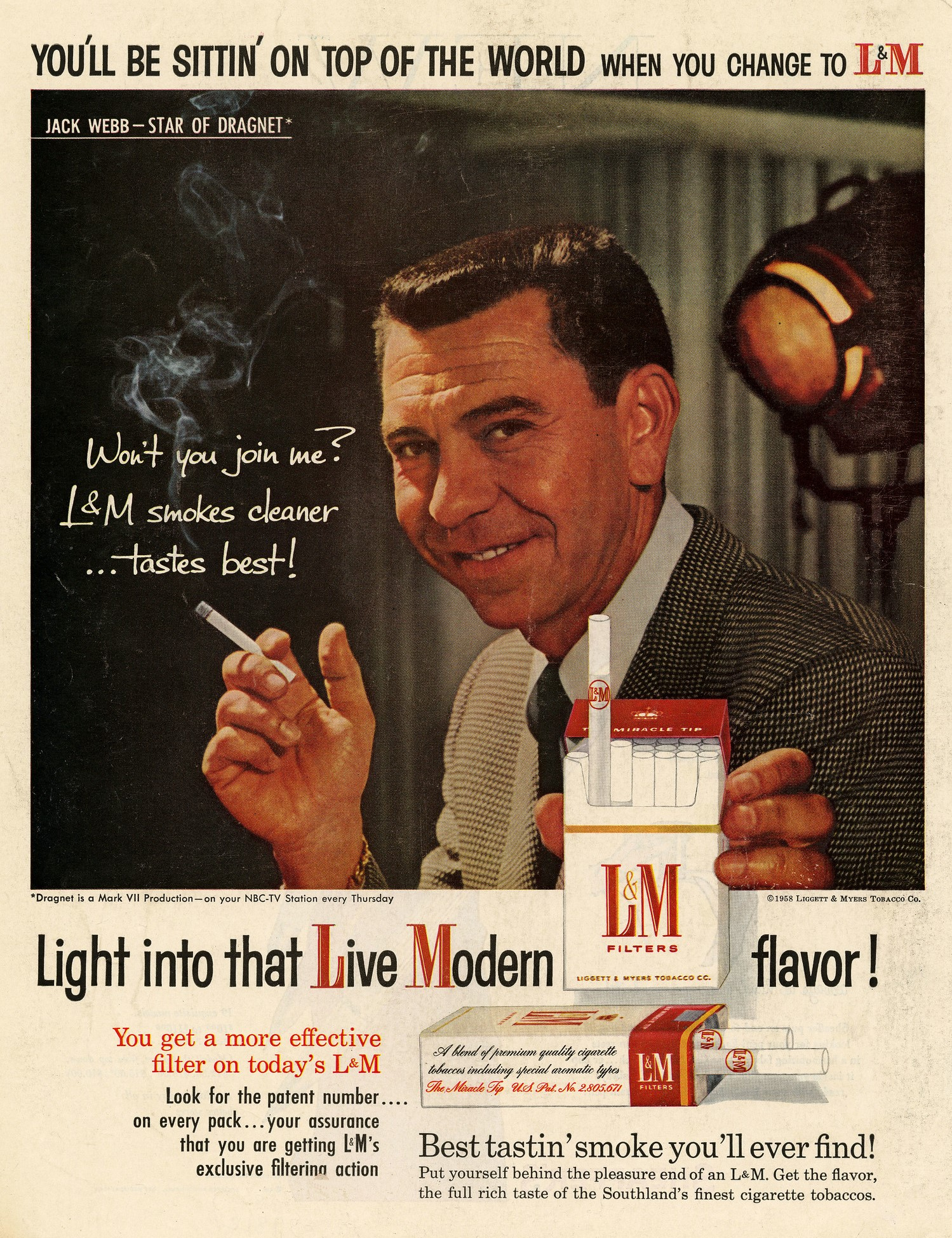
1958 advertisement featuring actor Jack Webb, promoting L&M's "exclusive filtering action"

Over the years, Liggett & Myers made many poster and magazine advertisements to promote the brand, which included slogans such as "No cigarette ever went so far so fast!". Hollywood celebrities such as Barbara Stanwyck, Rosalind Russell and Fredric March starred in various print advertisement to promote the brand by claiming that L&M filters were "Just what the doctor ordered!".

Various TV advertisements were also created. The best known ones were the "Just What The Doctor Ordered", "Live Modern", "Stay Fresh, Stay Fresh With L&M", and "Come on Over to the L&M Side" ads.

== Markets ==
L&M cigarettes are sold in Afghanistan, Albania, Algeria, Argentina, Armenia, Austria, Belgium, Belarus, Bolivia, Brazil, Bulgaria, Chile, Cyprus, Czech Republic, Denmark, Dominican Republic, Egypt, Estonia, Finland, France, Georgia, Germany, Greece, Guatemala, Ireland, India, Indonesia, Israel, Italy, Kazakhstan, Latvia, Libya, Lithuania, Luxembourg, Malaysia, Mexico, Moldova, Morocco, Netherlands, Norway, Oman, Peru, Poland, Portugal, Romania, Russia, Saudi Arabia, Serbia, Singapore, Slovakia, Slovenia, South Korea, Spain, Sweden, Switzerland, Taiwan, Thailand, Turkey, Ukraine, United Arab Emirates and the United States.

== Controversy ==
=== L&M and doctor-approved cigarettes ===
In the 1950s, L&M introduced an ad campaign called "Just What the Doctor Ordered!". This campaign came at the time L&M introduced the first filtered cigarette. In these L&M advertisements from the early 1950s, "just what the doctor ordered" had a double-meaning. Not only did it imply that L&M cigarettes were satisfying in that they offered both flavour and protection, but it also implied that doctors approved of the brand. In an advertisement that appeared in a February 1954 issue of Life, Hollywood star Fredric March made an assertion after having read the letter written by a "Dr. Darkis" that was inset into the advertisement. Darkis explained in this letter that L&M filters used a "highly purified alpha cellulose" that was "entirely harmless" and "effectively filtered the smoke".

Similar contemporaneous advertisements from Viceroy claimed that their filtered cigarettes were healthy because doctors recommended Viceroys to patients. These ads claimed health benefits for filters, though filters actually did little to reduce the hazards of smoking. In fact, tobacco industry chemists were aware that most filters actually removed no more tar and nicotine than would the same length of tobacco. However, a series of Reader's Digest articles worked to publicize these dubious health claims for filters in the 1950s.

One such article, entitled "How Harmful are Cigarettes?" (1950) claimed that artificial filters took out nicotine and that silica-gel cartridges removed 60% of nicotine from cigarettes. This article spurred Viceroy to print advertisements a week later which read: "Reader's Digest tells why filtered cigarette smoke is better for your health." These health claims sparked a boom in Viceroy cigarette sales, as well as an onslaught of new filter cigarette brands flooding the market. Kent was introduced in 1952 with a filter made of treated asbestos on crepe paper. In 1953, L&M followed with a miracle tip, and Philip Morris advertised its diethylene glycol (Di-Gl) filter cigarette as the cigarette that took the fear out of smoking. In the next two years, Marlboro was re-released as a filter cigarette that targeted men (it had previously targeted women, with a beauty tip to protect the lips), and Winston was introduced with an advertising budget of $15 million.

=== Bulgarian Customs destroy counterfeit L&M cigarettes ===
On July 21, 2011, the Bulgarian customs authorities and Phillip Morris Bulgaria representatives organized the destruction of over 7 million counterfeit cigarettes bearing the mark L&M. The destroyed cigarettes were part of over 14.5 million cigarettes seized by the Bulgarian customs officials in September 2010 and February 2011 at the border checkpoints Kulata and Ilinden, southwestern Bulgaria. Bulgaria’s Customs Agency and Philip Morris Bulgaria had signed a co-operation agreement aimed at fighting the illicit trade of tobacco products. L&M cigarettes made 3% of all seized cigarettes in Bulgaria in 2010 and 9% of all seized cigarettes during the first five months of 2011.

== Sponsorship ==
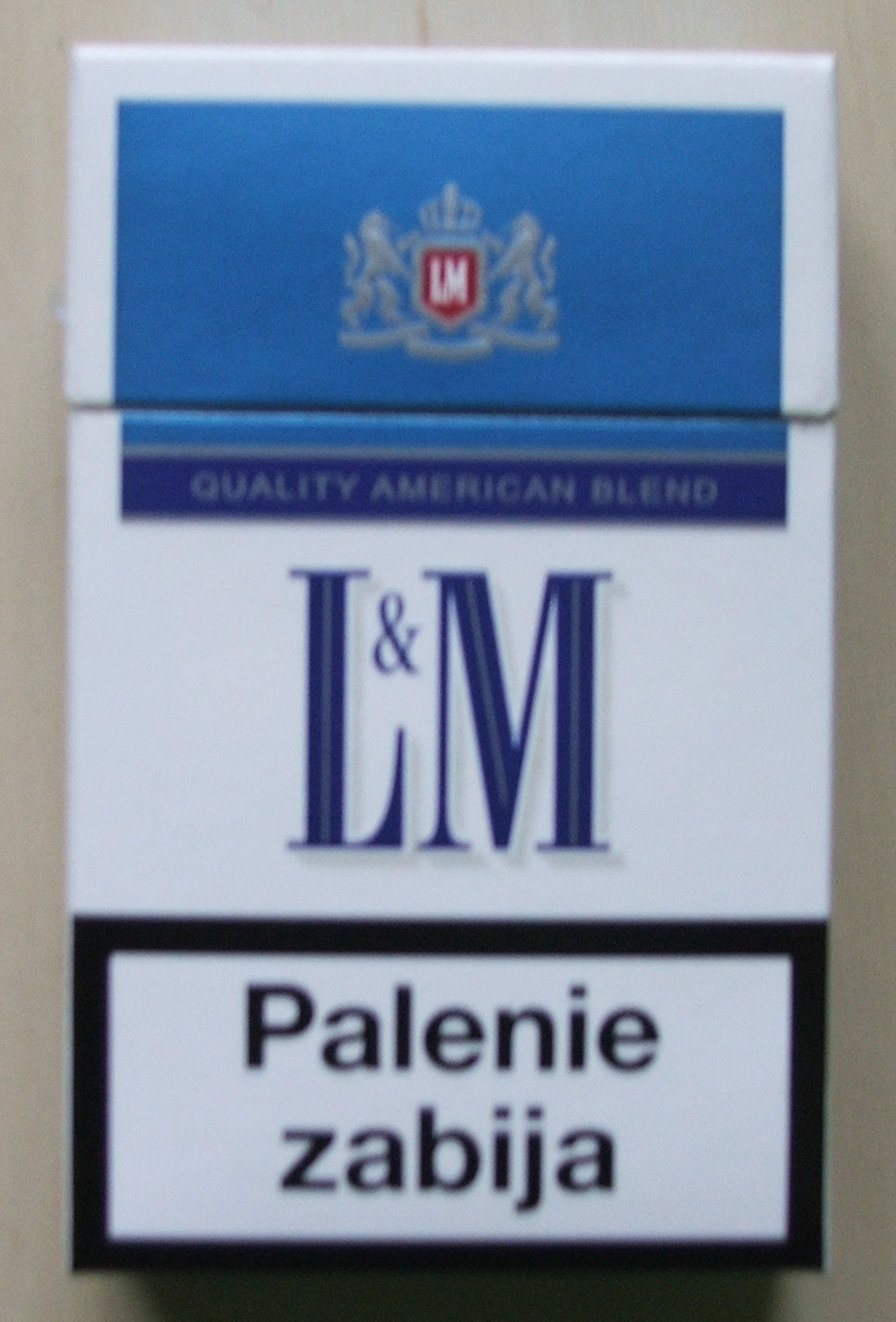
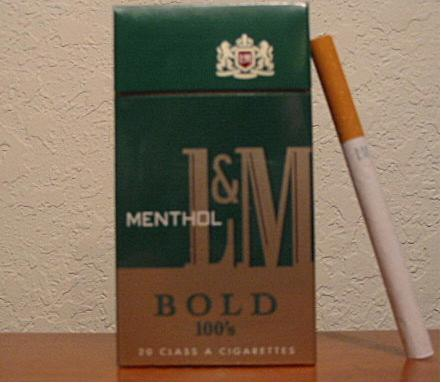
Different packs of L&M cigarettes

=== Motorsports ===
L&M sponsored the Carl Haas Racing's Lola cars driven by Peter Revson in the 1970 Can-Am season and Jackie Stewart in 1971. In 1972 L&M supported the Penske Racing Porsches of George Follmer and Mark Donohue.

L&M sponsored one of the Ducati bikes that Ben Bostrom drove in 2001 and 2002. The company also sponsored the Derbi factory team competing in the 2001 Grand Prix motorcycle racing season on the 125-cc class.

=== Television shows ===
L&M, as well as Kellogg's, were the main sponsors of the Hotel de Paree television show from October 2, 1959, until June 3, 1960.

Gunsmoke was even advertised off-camera by Matt Dillon (James Arness) and Doc Adams (Milburn Stone). L&M also sponsored the radio version of "Gunsmoke".

Jackie Gleason's You're in the Picture ("Apology" episode) has Mr. Gleason pitching and smoking L&M cigarettes.

== See also ==
- Tobacco smoking
