= Werner Geissler =

German businessman

Werner Geissler (born 1953) is a German businessman, with extensive experience in the United States, Japan, Europe and Emerging Markets.

== Biography ==
=== Early life ===
Werner Geissler was born in 1953 in Hachenburg, Heuzert, Germany. After graduation from the Gymnasium Marienstatt in 1972, he joined the Air Force. He received an M.B.A. (Diplom-Kaufmann) from the University of Cologne in 1979.

=== Career ===
He joined Procter & Gamble (P&G)as Assistant Brand Manager after graduation in 1979. He held positions of increasing scope and responsibility in Marketing/Brand Management (e.g. BM for Mr. Proper, Pampers) before becoming Marketing Director in Holland and Germany. In 1991, he was promoted to General Manager of a new Cosmetics and Fragrances business unit before becoming Vice President of Fine Fragrances for the Western Hemisphere, based in Santa Monica/California. Following stints as Vice President for the Laundry, Cleaning & Paper business in Germany as well as subsequently for P&G's operation in Turkey/Caucasia/Central Asia, Geissler became President of P&G's business in Northeast Asia in 2001. In 2004 he was promoted to Group President for the Central & Eastern Europe, Middle East and Africa business unit. In July 2007, he became Vice Chairman in charge of Global Operations with responsibility for all country and manufacturing operations globally and served in this capacity until his retirement in January 2015, after almost 36 years of service.

Post-retirement, Geissler has been an Operating Partner at the Private Equity Firm Advent International. He is also an active investor in several Start ups covering a broad range of industries. Amongst those are Chefslist (a leading platform to connect Food wholesalers and restaurants) peaq (a platform for the economy of things) and datacAIre, a AI-based system to clean up and self-heal master and operational data, based in Boston.

He has been a member of the Board of Directors (BoD) of The Goodyear Tire and Rubber Company (2011 - 2026) and a member of the BoD of Philip Morris International (PMI) since 2015. At PMI, he is Chairman of the Compensation & Leadership Development Committee. He has been a member of the Worldwide Business Council for Sustainable Development and an Advisor to the Governor of the Hyōgo Prefecture in Japan.

He has served on the Supervisory Board of the International Institute for Management Development in Lausanne, Switzerland from 2007 to 2017, on the Management Board of GS 1 from 2008 to 2015, and on the Summit Committee of the Consumer Goods Forum. He is the recipient of an Honorary Doctorate from the International University in Geneva. Geissler has also served on the BoD of economiesuisse and the board of Keidanren (Japan Business Federation) in Japan. In 2005, he was awarded an Honorary Doctorate from the International University in Geneva and in 2013, Geissler was appointed Visiting Professor at China Executive Leadership Academy in Pudong/Shanghai (CELAP).

=== Personal life ===
Geissler and his family have lived in places like Frankfurt, Rotterdam, Los Angeles, Istanbul, Kobe, Geneva and Cincinnati. He is now based in Munich. In 2012, he served as International Chair of the World Choir Games. In 2018, he served as "Schirmherr"of the 750th Anniversary of his birthplace, Heuzert/Westerwald. He is married to his wife Sabine and has 2 daughters, Anna and Lena.
