= Philip Morris (tobacconist) =

British tobacconist and cigarette importer (1835–1873)

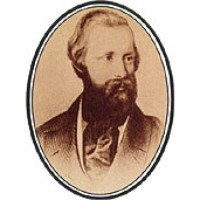
Philip Morris

Philip Morris (1835–1873) was a British tobacconist and cigarette importer, whose name was later used for Philip Morris & Co. Ltd. established in New York City in 1902.

== Life and career ==
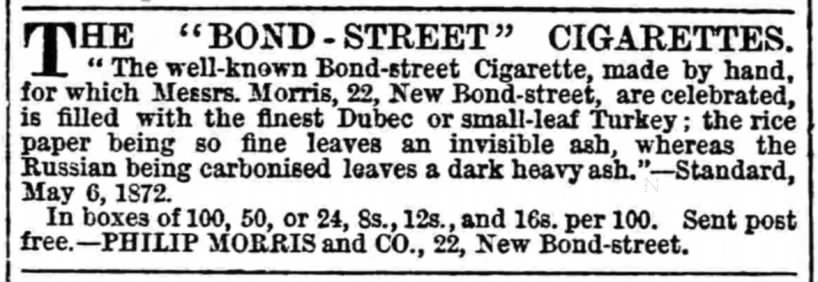
An 1872 advert in The Morning Post for Morris's cigarettes

In 1847, Philip Morris's family opened a tobacco shop on Bond Street in London, where he sold loose tobacco and pre-rolled cigarettes. By 1854, he had started making his own cigarettes. In 1870, Morris began to produce Philip Morris Cambridge and Philip Morris Oxford Blues (later called Oxford Ovals and Philip Morris Blues).

Morris died in 1873 at age 38, while his widow Margaret and brother, Leopold Morris, carried on his cigarette trade.
