= Johnny Roventini =

American actor (1910–1998)

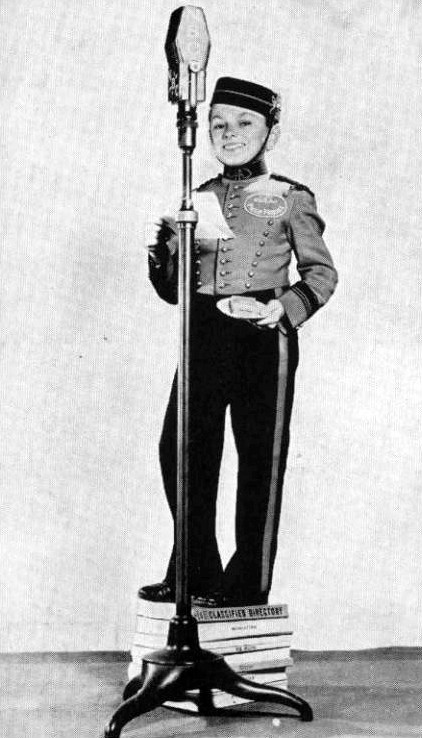
- Johnny Roventini as "Johnny the Bellboy" for Philip Morris, c. 1940s
- Born: John Louis Roventini; August 15, 1910; Brooklyn, New York, U.S.
- Died: November 30, 1998 (aged 88); Suffern, New York, U.S.
- Occupations: bellboy character actor
- Known for: Character of Johnny the Bellboy for Philip Morris advertising.

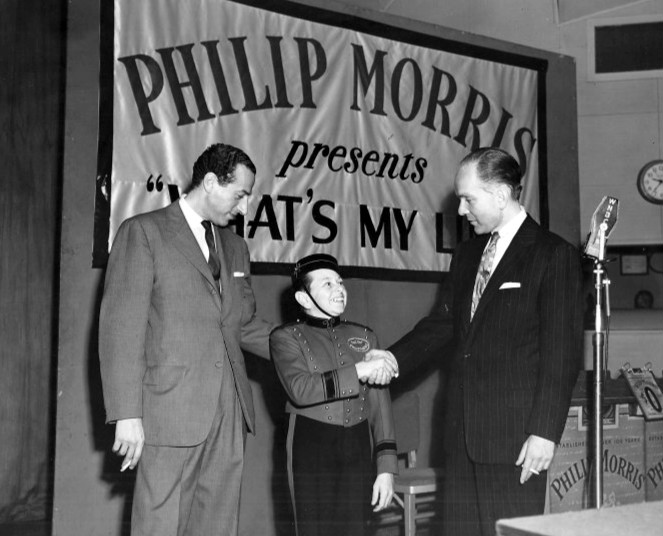
Mark Goodson, Johnny Roventini, and Bill Todman (1952)

Johnny Roventini, also known as John Louis Roventini and popularly as Johnny Philip Morris, (August 15, 1910 – November 30, 1998), was an American actor.

Less than four feet tall as a fully developed adult, Roventini was working as a bellboy at the New Yorker Hotel in 1933 when he was discovered by an advertising mogul, who had him perform a page, issuing a "Call for Philip Morris". He reportedly could always vocalize a perfect B-flat tone as he repeated those words, literally over a million times during his career, according to his own estimate.

He soon became famous as a product spokesman for Philip Morris brand cigarettes in radio, television and print advertising media. He was described by Philip Morris personnel as a "living trademark", and represented the company for over 40 years. He also played roles in the growth of broadcast media, most notably helping Lucille Ball and Desi Arnaz with the initial success of their innovative I Love Lucy comedy series beginning in 1951.

== Early life ==
Roventini was born in Brooklyn, New York, to Italian immigrants. Physically, he was a dwarf. As an adult, he was 47 inches tall (3'11") and weighed 59 pounds. Employed as a bellman (or "bellboy") in the New Yorker Hotel in New York City, his size and distinctive, high-pitched voice led the hotel to promote him as the "smallest bellboy in the world".

== Discovery ==
The Call for Philip Morris advertising campaign began during World War I, involving a drawing of a bellboy presenting Philip Morris cigarettes on a tray. The campaign was successful, continuing for fifteen years with minimal changes.

In 1933, the advertising account of Philip Morris was managed by Milton H. Biow, the principal of the Biow Agency. Set on revamping Call for Philip Morris, and having heard of Roventini, he went to the New Yorker with Philip Morris executive Alfred E. Lyons to observe Roventini at work. According to legend, he paid Roventini a dollar to page a man named Philip Morris. Roventini repeatedly cried, "Call for Philip Morris!", not knowing until later that he was auditioning to become a mascot for cigarettes.

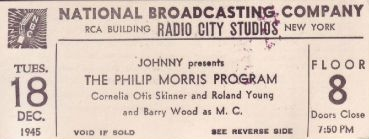
Ticket for the Philip Morris Program radio show, 1945, presented by "Johnny"

The page was exactly what Biow and Lyons wanted. In April 1933, Roventini was hired to make a "Call for Phil-ip Mor-rees" on the different radio programs sponsored by the company. Roventini had been earning $15 a week at the hotel (about $370 today) and received $100 (about $2,490 today) for his very first radio commercial. He later recounted that he only accepted the new job after checking with his mother, with whom he lived much of his life. He was soon earning $50,000 annually, a substantial wage for such work in those years (as it was about $1,243,570 in today's money), according to his biography.

== Career ==
It was obvious to his fans that Roventini enjoyed playing the smallness of his character, which Biow and others helped him capitalize upon. Philip Morris Tobacco Company provided a small chauffeur-driven American Austin convertible automobile to take Roventini to the live radio broadcasts. He became a friend to movie stars, sitting on popular actress Marlene Dietrich's lap in a publicity shot. During World War II, he patriotically tried joining the Coast Guard Auxiliary and, probably to no one's surprise, was rejected for being too short. He shared a dinner table with General and Mrs. Dwight D. Eisenhower, clowned around with Red Skelton, sat ringside with fighter Jack Dempsey, and participated in numerous parades and other public events. There were at least ten other Johnnys, known as "Johnny Juniors", including Albert Alteiri. This made it possible for Johnny to appear simultaneously in various sections of the country.

Roventini was heard on popular live radio programs and appeared in his short-jacketed bellboy outfit on some of the most-watched television shows of the 1950s and 1960s, including I Love Lucy, Candid Camera, The Red Skelton Show and The Jackie Gleason Show.

== I Love Lucy ==
He was probably most well known for his Philip Morris promotional work in the sitcom I Love Lucy. In 1951, in the early days of commercial broadcast television in the United States, the new comedy show ran into difficulties when it first sought sponsorship. This was due to the Cuban character played by Desi Arnaz. Advertisers were fearful of unknown public acceptance of the show featuring a marriage of mixed ethnicity in that era. After failing to win financial backing from CBS executives, Arnaz traveled to New York to hawk the show, and struck a deal with advertising mogul Milton Biow, who bought the show for his client, Philip Morris cigarettes. The tobacco company sponsored I Love Lucy exclusively from its premiere on October 15, 1951, through Christmas of 1954 (it then shifted to an "alternate sponsorship" with Procter & Gamble until June 1955). Although Philip Morris had a rich return for its investment and risk-taking in backing I Love Lucy, Arnaz also had the wisdom to retain ownership of the I Love Lucy shows, effectively inventing both the "rerun" and syndication procedures for the fledgling television industry.

The show was enormously popular with the viewing public, and with Lucy and Desi, and sidekicks William Frawley and Vivian Vance (as neighbors Fred and Ethel Mertz), Johnny and Philip Morris gained into unprecedented national television prominence. Johnny's voice and face was often the first thing one heard and saw respectively on Monday evenings on the CBS television network as I Love Lucy opened. Johnny also did a number of commercial spots with stars of the hit show, Lucille Ball and Arnaz, who were expected to promote products sponsoring their shows in that era, when embedding ads straight into programs and in having the stars of shows do ads for the sponsors was common practice. In a particularly memorable episode, "Lucy Does a TV Commercial", the actress dresses up in the "Johnny the Bellhop" costume. Industry watchers reported that Lucy, Desi and Johnny had soon become fast friends while working together.

As I Love Lucy was enjoying its enormous popularity, the U.S. was in an early period of the Cold War. The politics of communism and the possibilities that subversive pro-communism activities were active within the United States became known as a Red Scare. In September 1953, allegations surfaced from columnist Walter Winchell that Lucille Ball was being investigated by the House Committee on Un-American Activities in the U.S. Congress for alleged communist ties. Johnny traveled from his home in New York to be with her at Desilu studios in Los Angeles, a gesture of support from both Roventini and her show's sponsor, Philip Morris, which she never forgot. Although with much difficulty, Lucy was able to disprove the charges.

== Later years ==
A Philip Morris representative once described Johnny Roventini as a "living trademark". In 1959, NBC Radio aired a special half-hour program to celebrate the 25th anniversary of his career, describing him (with an apparent double entendre) as "an advertising giant".

In April 1970, Congress passed the Public Health Cigarette Smoking Act banning the advertising of cigarettes on radio and television starting on January 2, 1971. In the years after tobacco advertising was prohibited in broadcast communications regulated by the U.S. Federal Communications Commission (FCC), Roventini made personal appearances for Philip Morris until he retired in 1974.

== Death ==
In retirement, Roventini enjoyed sailing. He never married and died in a hospital near White Plains, New York, in 1998, at the age of 88. The cause of death was listed as "natural causes".

"Johnny's fame as an advertising legend was enhanced by an ever-present smile and outstretched hand that won him friends wherever he went," Philip Morris eulogized.

== Legacy ==
Johnny Roventini's original uniform (red usher's jacket, piped trousers, black pillbox hat and white gloves) was donated to the American Advertising Museum, which was located in Portland, Oregon, before closing in 2004.

His catchphrase was the inspiration for Call Federal Credit Union, a credit union that initially served only Philip Morris employees.
