= Louis C. Camilleri =

American businessman (born 1955)

Louis Carey Camilleri
- Born: Louis Carey Camilleri; 13 January 1955 (age 71); Alexandria, Egypt
- Education: University of Lausanne (B.B.A.)
- Title: CEO of Ferrari N.V. Chairman of Philip Morris International
- Spouse: Marjolyn Camilleri (div. 2004)

Signature
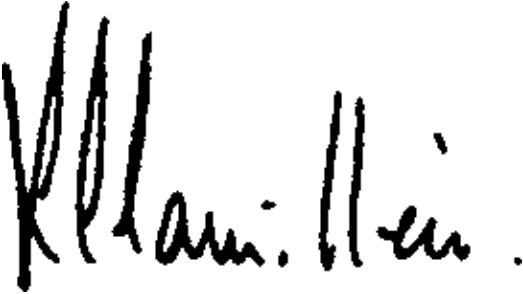

Louis Carey Camilleri (born 13 January 1955) is a former CEO of Ferrari and former chairman of Philip Morris International. He resigned from both positions with immediate effect on 10 December 2020, citing personal reasons.

== Career ==
=== Philip Morris International ===
After working as a business analyst with W. R. Grace and Company, in Lausanne, Camilleri joined Philip Morris Europe in 1978 as a business development analyst. He held various positions of increasing authority involving the cigarette business in Europe and the Middle East. In December 1995, he was appointed president and chief executive officer of Kraft Foods. In November 1996, he was named senior vice president and chief financial officer of Philip Morris.

In April 2002, Camilleri became CEO of Philip Morris, now Altria Group. In early 2007, Camilleri became CEO of Philip Morris International when the tobacco company spun off from Altria Group.

=== Ferrari ===
In July 2018, Camilleri was named CEO of Ferrari, replacing Sergio Marchionne. Since starting work with Ferrari, the brand's Formula One team adopted the Mission Winnow monicker.

== Personal life ==
Camilleri was born in Egypt, to Maltese parents.

Divorced since 2004, Camilleri is the father of three. He speaks fluent English, French, Italian, Arabic, and Maltese as well as some German.

In 2008, Camilleri earned a total compensation of $32,028,923, which included a salary of $1,567,308, stock awards of $14,151,629, and non-equity incentive plan compensation of $9,450,000. His total compensation increased by 33.2% compared to the year before.

Business positions
Preceded by Geoffrey Bible	Chairman and CEO of Altria Group; 2002–2008	Succeeded by Michael Szymanczyk
