= List of tobacco-related topics =

Nicotiana is the genus of herbs and shrubs which is cultivated to produce tobacco products.

Tobacco is an agricultural product processed from the fresh leaves of plants in the genus Nicotiana.

Tobacco may also refer to:

== Actions ==
- Chipper (tobacco)
- Smoking pipe (tobacco)
- Tobacco harm reduction
- Tobacco rings
- Tobacco smoking
- Usages of tobacco

== Tobacco ==
=== Types ===
- Burley (tobacco)
- Criollo tobacco
- Latakia (tobacco)
- Turkish tobacco
- Langkum

=== Products ===
- Cavendish Tobacco
- Chewing tobacco
- Cigarette card
- Dipping tobacco
- Kodiak tobacco
- Queen's Tobacco-pipe
- Shag (tobacco)
- Smokeless tobacco
- Snuff
- Snus
- Tobacco barn
- Y1 (tobacco)

=== Pathogens ===
- Satellite Tobacco Mosaic Virus
- Tobacco etch virus
- Tobacco leaf curl virus
- Tobacco mosaic virus
- Tobacco necrosis virus
- Tobacco ringspot virus
- Tobacco streak virus
- Tobacco stunt virus
- Tobacco vein mottling virus

== Legal ==
=== Legislation ===
- Tobacco Damages and Health Care Costs Recovery Act
- Tobacco Master Settlement Agreement
- Tobacco packaging warning messages
- Tobacco Products Control Act
- Tobacco taxation

=== Court cases ===
- FDA v. Brown & Williamson Tobacco Corp.
- Imperial Tobacco v. British Columbia
- The Cherokee tobacco case
- United States v. American Tobacco Co.

=== Agreements ===
- Tobacco litigation
- Tobacco lobby
- Tobacco Lords

== Movements ==
=== Culture ===
- Legacy Tobacco Documents Library Multimedia Collection

=== Campaigns ===
- Tobacco Protest
- Anti-tobacco movement in Nazi Germany
- Smoking ban
- Tobacco advertising
- Tobacco Advertising and Promotion Act 2002
- Tobacco cessation clinic
- World Health Organization Framework Convention on Tobacco Control

=== Education ===
- Drug, Alcohol, and Tobacco Education

== Names ==
=== Brands ===
- Drum (tobacco)
- Oliver Twist Tobacco
- Prince Albert (tobacco)
- Skoal tobacco

=== Businesses ===
- Altadis
- Altria Group
- American Tobacco Company
- Bloch Brothers Tobacco Company
- British American Tobacco
- Brown & Williamson
- China National Tobacco Co.
- Donskoy Tabak
- Fortune Tobacco
- Imperial Tobacco
- Japan Tobacco
- KT&G
- Liggett Group
- Lorillard Tobacco Company
- Mac Baren
- Republic Tobacco
- R. J. Reynolds Tobacco Company
- Reemtsma
- Santa Fe Natural Tobacco Company
- Scandinavian Tobacco Group
- SEITA
- Tabacalera
- Tabaqueira
- Taiwan Tobacco and Liquor Corporation
- Tekel
- Tobacco Institute
- Tobacco Radio Network
- U.S. Smokeless Tobacco Company
- Vector Tobacco
- W. T. Blackwell and Company Tobacco Factory

=== Persons ===
- Louis Tobacco
- Old Tobacco
- Young Tobacco
- Tobacco (musician)

=== Locations ===
- Bakery, Confectionery, Tobacco Workers and Grain Millers' International Union
- Duke Homestead and Tobacco Factory
- Mail Pouch Tobacco Barn
- Model Tobacco Building
- Northern Wisconsin Co-op Tobacco Pool Warehouse
- Port Tobacco Village, Maryland
- Rose Hill (Port Tobacco, Maryland)
- Sarajevo Tobacco Factory
- Stanley Dock Tobacco Warehouse
- Tobacco Bay (Bermuda)
- Tobacco Dock
- Tobacco Garden Creek
- Tobacco Road (disambiguation)
- Tobacco Root Mountains
- Tobacco Row
- Tobacco Township, Michigan

=== Organizations ===
- Canadian Council for Tobacco Control
- Delaware Division of Alcohol and Tobacco Enforcement
- Florida Division of Alcoholic Beverages and Tobacco
- Georgia Alcohol and Tobacco Division
- Indiana Alcohol and Tobacco Commission
- Lakson Group
- Maryland Alcohol and Tobacco Tax Bureau
- Oxford Tobacco Research Station
- Thailand Tobacco Monopoly FC
- Youth Tobacco Cessation Collaborative

=== Other ===
- Iwan Ries and Co.
- Tobacco Road (novel)
- Tobacco (tribe)
- Tobacco Plains Indian Band

== See also ==
- Big Tobacco
- Bureau of Alcohol, Tobacco, Firearms and Explosives
- History of commercial tobacco in the United States
- List of countries by tobacco consumption per capita
- Plantation economy
- Nicotine
- Smoking
- Tar (tobacco residue)
- Tobacco and health
- Tobacco and other drugs
- Prevalence of tobacco usage
