= Tobacco (disambiguation) =

Tobacco is a common plant.

Tobacco may also refer to:

- Tobacco (musician) (born Thomas Fec, 1980), American electronic musician
- "Tobacco" (Last Week Tonight with John Oliver), an HBO news satire television series episode
- Tobacco (film), a 1962 Bulgarian drama film
- Tobacco (tribe), an indigenous Iroquoian people eastern North America
- Tobacco River (disambiguation), two rivers in Michigan
- Tobacco Road (disambiguation)
- Tobacco Township, Michigan

== See also ==
- Tabaco, a city in Albay, Philippines
- Tabasco (disambiguation)
