= Jewelers Building =

The Jewelers Building or Jewelers' Building may refer to:

- Jewelers Building (1882) in Chicago, Illinois, built in 1881–1882, designed by Dankmar Adler and Louis Sullivan; also known as the Little Jewelers Building and the Iwan Ries Building
- 35 East Wacker in Chicago, Illinois, built in 1925–1927, designed by Joachim G. Giaver and Frederick P. Dinkelberg
