= Imperial Tobacco Canada =

Cigarette company

Imperial Tobacco Canada Limited
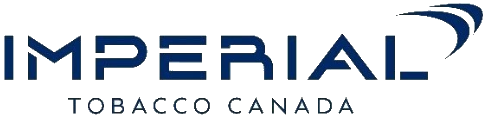

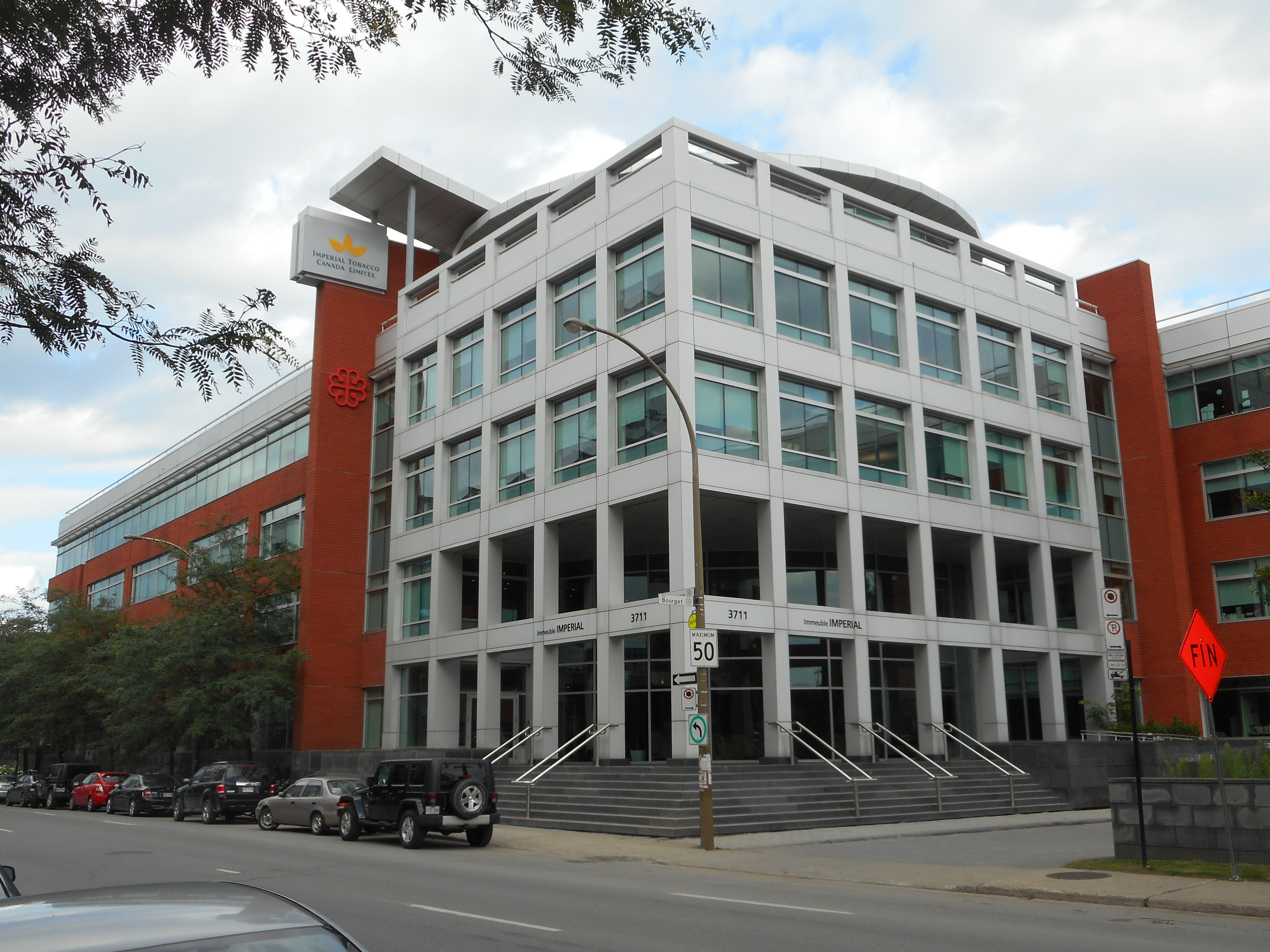
- Company building in Montreal, 2016
- Type: Subsidiary
- Industry: Tobacco
- Founded: 1908; 118 years ago
- Headquarters: Montreal, Quebec, Canada
- Area served: Worldwide
- Key people: Frank Silva (CEO)
- Products: Cigarettes
- Brands: Du Maurier; John Player Special; Marlboro; Matinée; Medallion; Pall Mall; Viceroy; Vogue
- Parent: British American Tobacco
- Website: imperialtobaccocanada.com

Imperial Tobacco Canada Limited is a cigarette manufacturing company operating in Canada. It is a wholly owned subsidiary of British American Tobacco. It was created in 1908 and bought out the Canadian interests of the American Tobacco Company, which was a monopoly in the United States until it was reorganized in 1911. Imperial Tobacco Canada has had no relationship to Imperial Tobacco Group plc since 1980, though British American Tobacco was established as a joint venture between Imperial Tobacco Group and American Tobacco. Imasco sold their stake to BAT in 2000.

== History ==
Imperial Tobacco Company of Canada was created in 1908 out of the merger of the Canadian interests of the American Tobacco Company with local Canadian tobacco companies.

American Tobacco, which had acquired the Kinney Brothers Tobacco Company, makers of the then-popular cigarette brand Sweet Caporal (which commanded a 50% share of the Canadian cigarette market at the time Imperial Tobacco acquired American Tobacco), had entered the Canadian market by acquiring the Montréal-based American Cigarette Company and D. Ritchie and Company, forming the American Tobacco Company of Canada, Ltd. Imperial Tobacco Company of Canada Ltd. was created out of the cigarette companies founded by Bartholome Houde and George E. Tuckett.

=== B. Houde & Co. ===
The company now known as B. Houde & Grothe was founded in 1841 in Quebec City by Bartholome Houde, who passed on his tobacco company to his son-in-law, Francois Xavier Dussault in 1882, after he retired. Francois's sons, J. A. Dussault and J. E. Dussault, turned the concern into the limited company B. Houde & Co. Ltee. in 1903.

In 1908, B. Houde was absorbed by American Tobacco Ltd., the Canadian arm of the United States cigarette monopoly the American Tobacco Co., at the time that American Tobacco merged with Empire Tobacco Co. Ltd. in 1908 to form the Imperial Tobacco Company of Canada. Imperial Tobacco still operates under its 1912 Dominion charter.

=== George E. Tuckett ===
George E. Tuckett began making cigars and plug tobacco in Hamilton, Ontario in the years before Confederation. Elected to the Hamilton City Council in 1864, at the age of 29, he later became Hamilton's 32nd Mayor. After his son George T. Tuckett entered the family cigar-making business in 1880, it began to expand, and it began manufacturing cigarettes in 1896. Starting from the original small shop George the elder had opened in Hamilton, the Tuckett Tobacco Company grew into a major manufacturer of cigarettes, cigars, and pipe tobaccos. The company was acquired by Imperial Tobacco in 1930.

=== Litigations ===
Imperial Tobacco was the first Canadian cigarette manufacturer to be successfully sued by a governmental entity in Canada. The province of British Columbia's lawsuit against Imperial was upheld by the Supreme Court of Canada in the landmark case British Columbia v. Imperial Tobacco Canada Limited, [2005] 2 S.C.R. 473, 2005 SCC 49. The Supreme Court ruled that the provincial Tobacco Damages and Health Care Costs Recovery Act, which allowed the government to sue tobacco companies, was constitutionally valid.

On June 1, 2015, the Quebec Superior Court ruled against Imperial Tobacco Canada, JTI-Macdonald, and RBH in two Quebec class action suits. The judgment against Imperial Tobacco was in excess of $10 billion – the highest tobacco judgement in Canadian history. The court found that Imperial failed in its duty of care to Quebec consumers prior to 1998. The court required a $1 billion payment to the plaintiffs within 60 days, regardless of appeal.

== Brands and products ==
Imperial Tobacco Canada (known as BAT Canada since approx. 2017) is a Canadian market leader in tobacco products, with approximately 50% market share of total tobacco products. Brands that BAT Canada markets include Du Maurier, John Player Special, Marlboro, Matinée, Medallion, Pall Mall, Viceroy, and Vogue.

BAT Canada recently (since approx. early 2018) started marketing a vaping product called Vype (later renamed Vuse), an alternative to combustible tobacco.
