= Du Maurier (cigarette) =

Canadian cigarette brand

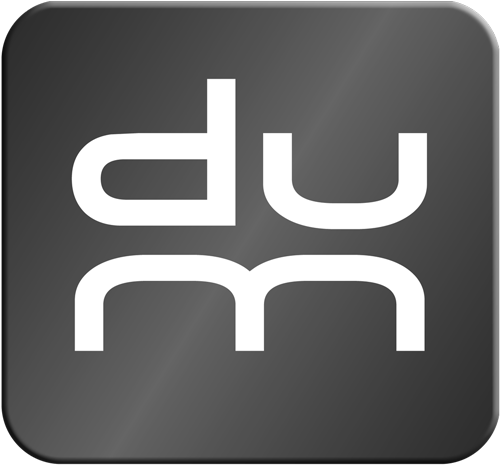
- Product type: Cigarette
- Current owner: British American Tobacco
- Produced by: Imperial Tobacco Canada; West Indian Tobacco Company (Trinidad and Tobago only)
- Country: Canada
- Introduced: 1930; 96 years ago
- Markets: Worldwide
- Previous owners: Peter Jackson Ltd.
- Website: dumaurier.ca

Du Maurier is a Canadian brand of cigarette produced by Imperial Tobacco Canada, a subsidiary of conglomerate British American Tobacco. The brand is named after Sir Gerald du Maurier, the noted British actor. The brand is also produced under license by the West Indian Tobacco Company in Trinidad and Tobago.

== History ==
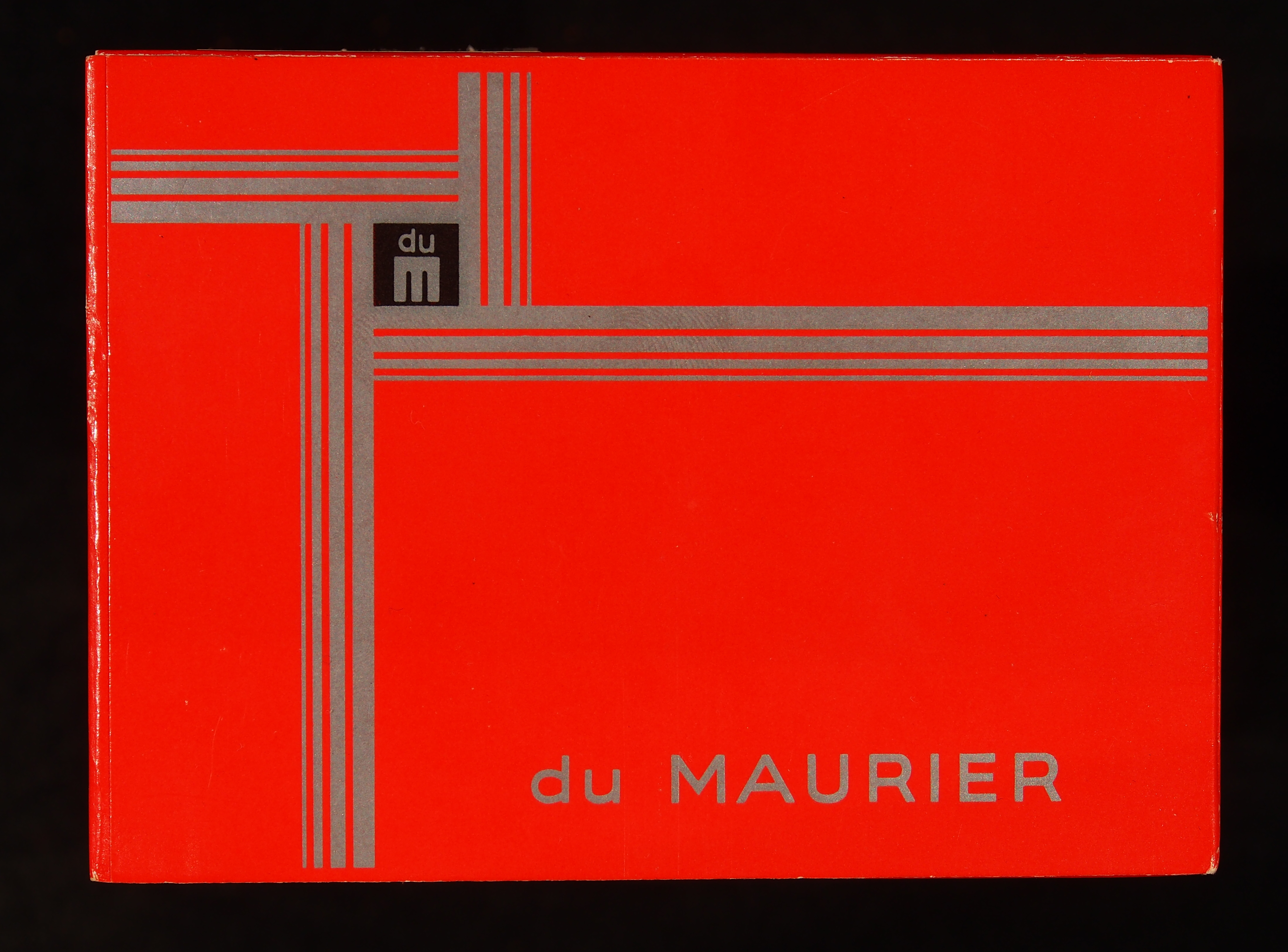
Pack of Du Maurier

The brand launched in the United Kingdom in 1930 after actor and producer Sir Gerald du Maurier (father of writer Daphne du Maurier) made requests for "a cigarette less irritating to his throat". He lent his name to the creation of a cigarette brand, the royalties for which he used to pay down his substantial tax liabilities. The tobacco company that launched the brand, Peter Jackson, was a subsidiary of International Tobacco, which was taken over by Gallaher in 1934.

In 1979, the brand passed to British American Tobacco, which had owned the trademark overseas since they acquired Peter Jackson (Overseas) Ltd.

In 2005, Du Maurier changed the aesthetic of their packs and cigarette vending machines. Various advertising posters were made for this brand.

== Sponsorship ==
Du Maurier was the sponsor of the Canadian Women's Open golf from 1988 until 2000, as well as the Canadian Open's women's tennis from 1997 until 2000, when new anti-tobacco legislation came into force in Canada and prohibited tobacco companies from sponsoring major sporting events.

== Product ==
Du Maurier markets the following varieties of cigarettes:

- Signature (red)
- Distinct (blue)
- Distinct Silver (silver)
- Mellow (beige)
- Menthol (green) (discontinued in Canada)
- Fine Cut Blend (discontinued) 2019
- Master Blend (discontinued) 2019
- Fresh Blend (discontinued in Canada)
- Special Blend

== See also ==
- Tobacco smoking
- Caballero (cigarette)
