= Gateway drug effect =

Substance-related disorder

The gateway drug effect (alternatively, stepping-stone theory, escalation hypothesis, or progression hypothesis) are terms denoting the hypothesis that the use of a psychoactive substance is coupled to an increased probability of the use of further substances. Possible explanations for this connection include environmental influence, personality traits that favour seeking both soft and hard drugs, alterations in the brain due to earlier substance exposure, as well as similar attitudes of people who use different substances, and therefore experience a "common liability to addiction".

A 2018 literature review conducted by the National Institute of Justice, which analyzed 23 peer-reviewed research studies, concluded "that existing statistical research and analysis relevant to the "gateway" hypothesis has produced mixed results", and that "no causal link between cannabis use and the use of other illicit drugs can be claimed at this time." However, in 2020, the National Institute on Drug Abuse released a research report which supported allegations that marijuana is a "gateway" to more dangerous substance use, despite stating that "most people who use or have used cannabis do not go on to use other substances later in life". One of the peer-reviewed papers cited in the report claims that while "some studies have found that use of legal drugs or cannabis are not a requirement for the progression to other illicit drugs ... most studies have supported the "gateway sequence", although the authors of the study itself conceded that they were "not able to ascribe causality". A study in Spain supports the claim that lifetime cannabis use (as well as early age of onset) greatly increased the likelihood of later legal substance use, as well as illegal substances and polysubstance.

== History ==
While the phrase gateway drug was first popularized by anti-drug activists such as Robert DuPont in the 1980s, the underlying ideas had already been discussed since the 1930s by using the phrases stepping-stone theory, escalation hypothesis, or progression hypothesis.

The scientific and political discussion has intensified since 1975 after the publications of several longitudinal studies by Denise Kandel and others.

In 2019, a research report by the National Institute on Drug Abuse determined that marijuana use is "likely to precede use of other licit and illicit substances", and cited a longitudinal study in which "adults who reported marijuana use during the first wave of the survey were more likely than adults who did not use marijuana to develop an alcohol use disorder within 3 years; people who used marijuana and already had an alcohol use disorder at the outset were at greater risk of their alcohol use disorder worsening." They further claimed that marijuana use "is also linked to other substance use disorders including nicotine addiction." While stating that their "findings are consistent with the idea of marijuana as a "gateway drug"", they conceded that "the majority of people who use marijuana do not go on to use other, "harder" substances", and that "cross-sensitization is not unique to marijuana. Alcohol and nicotine also prime the brain for a heightened response to other drugs and are, like marijuana, also typically used before a person progresses to other, more harmful substances."

On the other hand, the 2018 report issued by the National Institute of Justice states "that the current state of research on this issue is limited, and the studies that have been conducted suffer from difficulties in collecting information and applying the findings to a larger population. The report further notes that although many of the reviewed studies found statistically significant associations between cannabis use and the users' later use of other illicit drugs, there is currently no conclusive evidence that cannabis use caused the later use of harder illicit drugs."

== Sequence of first-time use ==
=== Concept ===
The concept of gateway drug is based on observations that the sequence of first-time use of different drugs is not random but shows trends. On the basis of established techniques of longitudinal studies such trends can be described precisely in terms of statistical probability. As to the interpretation of the observed trends, there is a difference between sequence and causation. Both may – but need not – be coupled, a question which is subject of further research, e.g., by physiological experiments.

=== Examples of trends ===
From a sample of 6,624 people who had not used other illegal drugs before their cannabis consumption the overall probability of later use of other illegal drugs was estimated to be 44.7%. Subgroup analyses showed that personal and social conditions, such as gender, age, marital status, mental disorders, family history of substance use, overlapping illegal drug distribution channels, alcohol use disorder, nicotine dependence, ethnicity, urbanicity, and educational attainment influenced the height of probability.

A study of drug use of 14,577 U.S. 12th graders showed that alcohol consumption was associated with an increased probability of later use of tobacco, cannabis, and other illegal drugs. Adolescents who smoked cigarettes before age 15 were up to 80 times more likely to use illegal drugs. Studies indicate vaping serves as a gateway to traditional cigarettes and cannabis use.

Large-scale longitudinal studies in the U.K. and New Zealand from 2015 and 2017 showed an association between cannabis use and an increased probability of later disorders in the use of other drugs.

Students who regularly consume caffeinated energy drinks have a greater risk of alcohol use disorder, cocaine use and misuse of prescription stimulants. The elevated risk remains after accounting for prior substance use and other risk factors.

A meta-analysis about the use of e-cigarettes of 2018 said that "Because the term 'gateway' has historically been used in colloquial, non-scientific settings and lacks a clear definition, it is not used in this report".

== Associations aside from first-time use ==
The role of cannabis use in regard to alcohol use and Alcohol Use Disorder (AUD) is still not fully understood. Some studies suggest better alcohol treatment completion for those who use cannabis, while other studies find the opposite. A 2016 review of 39 studies which examined the relation between cannabis use and alcohol use found that 16 studies support the idea that cannabis and alcohol are substitutes for each other, 10 studies found that they are complements, 12 found that they are neither complementary nor substitutes, and one found that they are both.

A study involving self-reported data from a sample of 27,461 people examined the relationship of cannabis use and AUD. These respondents had no prior diagnosis of AUD. Of the 27,461 people, 160 had reported cannabis use within the past year. At the end of a three-year period, it found that those who had previously reported cannabis use were associated with a five times greater odds of being diagnosed with AUD than those who had not. After adjustment for select confounders (age, race, marital status, income, and education), these odds were reduced to two times greater risk. Another sample of self-reported data from 2,121 persons included only those who had already been diagnosed with AUD. In this sample, it was found that those who had reported cannabis use in the past year (416 people) were associated with 1.7 greater odds of AUD persistence three years later. After adjustment for the same confounders as before, these odds were reduced to 1.3.

== Causes ==
Because a sequence of first-time use can only indicate the possibility – but not the fact – of an underlying causal relation, different theories concerning the observed trends were developed. The scientific discussion (state of 2016) is dominated by two concepts, which appear to cover almost all possible causal connections if appropriately combined. These are the theories of biological alterations in the brain due to an earlier drug use and the theory of similar attitudes across different drugs.

=== Alterations in the brain ===
Adolescent rats repeatedly injected with tetrahydrocannabinol increased the self-administration of heroin (results based on 11 male rats and >50 male rats), morphine (study based on 12 male rats) and also nicotine (34 rats). There were direct indications that the alteration consisted of lasting anatomical changes in the reward system of the brain. Because the reward system is anatomically, physiologically, and functionally almost identical across the class of mammals, the importance of the findings from animal studies for the reward system in the human brain in relation to the liability to the use of further drugs has been pointed out in several reviews.

In mice, nicotine increased the probability of later consumption of cocaine, and the experiments permitted concrete conclusions on the underlying molecular biological alteration in the brain. The biological changes in mice correspond to the epidemiological observations in humans that nicotine consumption is coupled to an increased probability of later use of cannabis and cocaine, as well as other drugs.

In rats, alcohol increased the probability of later addiction to cocaine and again relevant alterations in the reward system were identified. These observations thus correspond to the epidemiological findings that the consumption of alcohol in humans is coupled to a later increased risk of a transition from cocaine use to cocaine addiction.

Controlled animal and human studies showed that caffeine (energy drinks) in combination with alcohol increased the craving for more alcohol more strongly than alcohol alone. These findings correspond to epidemiological data that people who consume energy drinks generally showed an increased tendency to take alcohol and other substances.

=== Personal, social and genetic factors ===
According to the concept of similar attitudes across different drugs (common liability to addiction), a number of personal, social, genetic and environmental factors can lead to a generally increased interest in various drugs. The sequence of first-time use would then depend on these factors. Violations of the typical sequence of first-time drug usage give credit to this theory. For example, in Japan, where cannabis use is uncommon, 83.2% of the people who used illicit substances did not use cannabis first. The concept received additional support from a large-scale genetic analysis that showed a genetic basis for the connection of the prevalence of cigarette smoking and cannabis use during the life of a person.

The results of a twin study presented indications that familial genetic and familial environmental factors do not fully explain these associations, and are possibly only relevant for sequences of some drugs. In 219 same-sex Dutch identical and non-identical twin pairs, one co-twin had reported cannabis use before the age of 18 whereas the other had not. In the cannabis group the lifetime prevalence of later reported use of party drugs was four times higher and the lifetime prevalence of later reported use of hard drugs was seven times higher than in the non-cannabis group. The authors concluded that at least family influences – both genetic and social ones – could not explain the differences. The study noted that, besides a potential causal role of cannabis use, non shared environment factors could play a role in the association such as differing peer affiliations that preceded the cannabis use.

Another twin study (of 510 same sex twin pairs) also examined the association of earlier cannabis use and later hard drug use. Like other studies it examined later drug use differences between siblings where one sibling had used cannabis early and the other had not. The study examined identical twins (who share approximately 100% of their genes) and non-identical twins (who share approximately 50% of their genes) separately and adjusted for additional confounders such as peer drug use. It found, after confounder adjustment, that the associations with later hard drug use existed only for non-identical twins. This suggests a significant genetic factor in the likelihood of later hard drug usage. The study suggested that a causal role of cannabis use in later hard drug usage is minimal, if it exists at all, and that cannabis use and hard drug use share the same influencing factors such as genetics and environment.

== See also ==
- Drug policy
- Substance abuse prevention
- Substance use disorder
- Tobacco and other drugs
