= Tobacco cessation clinics in India =

Tobacco Cessation Clinic is an initiative by the World Health Organization (WHO) and the Ministry of Health of India. Tobacco cessation activities formally began with the opening of 13 tobacco cessation clinics in Anand, Bhopal, Bangalore, Chandigarh, Chennai, Cuttack, Delhi (2), Goa, Jaipur, Lucknow, Mumbai, and Patna in 2002. Tobacco cessation clinics were renamed to tobacco cessation centers in 2005. Five more tobacco cessation centers were established in Mizoram, Guwahati, Kolkata, Hyderabad and Trivandrum, which makes a total of 18 centers.

The services offered at the clinic include individual intervention in the form of behavioral counseling, medication, and nicotine replacement therapy. The centers also intend to create awareness among the general public about the negative effects of tobacco and about tobacco cessation through awareness programs, exhibitions training programs on tobacco cessation for various professionals, and information booklets and manuals aimed at specific groups of the population.

The Tobacco Cessation Clinic Resource Center (TCCRC), which is functioning in the National Institute of Mental Health and Neurosciences, (NIMHANS), Bangalore, is the national coordinating center for all the TCCs. The center in Bangalore runs an out patient clinic twice a week (Saturdays and Mondays) in the de-addiction OP section of the NIMHANS.

== Locations ==
Center	Place	State
Shree Krishna hospital and PSM college	Anand	Gujarat
National Institute of Mental Health and Neurosciences (NIMHANS)	Bangalore	Karnataka
Jawaharlal Nehru Cancer Hospital & Research Centre	Bhopal	Madhya Pradesh
PGIMER	Chandigarh	Chandigarh
Cancer Institute (Adyar Cancer Institute)	Chennai	Tamil Nadu
A.H. Regional Cancer Centre	Cuttack	Orissa
Institute of Human Behaviour & Allied Sciences (IHBAS)	Dilshad Garden	Delhi
Vallabhbhai Patel Chest Institute	University Of Delhi	Delhi
Vaidya Hospital	Panaji	Goa
Bhagwan Mahaveer Cancer Hospital & Research Center	Jaipur	Rajasthan
King George's Medical College	Lucknow	Uttar Pradesh
Tata Memorial Hospital	Mumbai	Maharashtra
Indira Gandhi Institute of Cardiology	Patna	Bihar
Directorate of Hospital and Medical Education	Aiswal	Mizoram
Dr. Bhubaneswar Borooh Cancer Institute ( Regional Institute for Treatment and Research)	Guwahati	Assam
MNJ institute of Oncology and Regional Cancer Center	Hyderabad	Telangana
Chittaranjan National Cancer Institute	Kolkata	West Bengal
Regional Cancer Centre, Thiruvananthapuram	Thiruvananthapuram	Kerala
