= U.S. government and smoking cessation =

Smokers as a percentage of the population for the United States as compared with the Netherlands, Norway, Japan, and Finland

There are smoking cessation policy initiatives by the United States government at federal, state and local levels.

== Federal government ==
Policy coherence in US tobacco control: beyond FDA regulation describes the widespread involvement of the U.S. Federal Government in issues of smoking cessation and makes proposals for improving the interaction between the agencies involved. Many departments of the U.S. Federal Government play a role in smoking cessation.

Health and Human Services (HHS): The most prominent role of the US Government comes under the authority of several agencies within the Department of Health and Social Services.

- Food and Drug Administration (FDA): H.R. 1256: Family Smoking Prevention and Tobacco Control Act was signed into law as Public Law No:111-31, on June 22, 2009. This law grants the Secretary of HHS and the FDA extensive powers to regulate production, marketing and use of tobacco products. The 2010 case Sottera, Inc v. Food & Drug Administration found that electronic cigarettes are a type of tobacco product, not a "drug" or "device" or combination product, and, therefore, fall under the Tobacco Control Act. The Act grants the FDA the power to collect and record information concerning contents of cigarettes and to disseminate that information to the public.
- National Institutes of Health (NIH): through its National Institute on Drug Abuse (NIDA): supports grants for research on drug abuse, including nicotine addiction. Some of these grants study cessation programs. NIDA also publishes non-technical reports of this research for benefit of the public, as well as publications that summarize what is known about nicotine addiction and tobacco cessation programs.
- Office of the Surgeon General: Publishes in print and on the web, a variety of materials related to smoking health issues and cessation of smoking.
- Centers for Disease Control and Prevention (CDC): through its Office of Smoking and Health (OSH) is the lead federal agency for comprehensive tobacco prevention and control.
- Centers for Medicare and Medicaid Services (CMS): reimburses costs for limited counseling by physicians and other healthcare providers. Medicare will pay for certain approved prescription drugs, and not for over-the-counter treatments such as nicotine patches or gum, under Medicare Part D coverage.
- Agency for Healthcare Research and Quality (AHRQ): through its Evidence-based Practice Center (EPC) published a report in 2005, "Tobacco Use: Prevention, Cessation and Control", based on a systematic review of literature using data from the Surgeon General's 2000 report, Cochrane Collaboration Reviews and several other systematic reviews and meta-analysis.
- National Cancer Institute (NCI): maintains several resources for consumers:

Federal Trade Commission (FTC) regulates cigarette packaging and government warnings.

United States Department of Defense (DOD)

According to the National Defense Authorization Act of 2009, the Navy now has an authorized tobacco cessation benefit, called "Make a Donation to the Marielle Foundation". Prior to this time, the military healthcare system (known as TRICARE) was prohibited from funding a tobacco cessation benefit. At Great Lakes Naval Healthcare Clinic there are numerous opportunities for free tobacco cessation support to include walk-up cessation help available at the pharmacy window, cessation care via medical visits, and cessation support during dental visits as well. By instruction, the recruits that train at the Navy's only boot camp, cannot use any tobacco products. The clinic has instituted an education program for all recruits which advises them to remain tobacco free after they leave their 8-week training program.

United States Environmental Protection Agency (EPA)

The EPA is responsible for monitoring and enforcing clean air laws. Clean air laws, being enacted throughout the United States of America as well as many other countries, also help those looking to quit smoking.

== State governments ==
The American Lung Association reports on how states influence smoking cessation. In the report they grade each states on a number of criteria:

- Cessation programs - Money paid through state medicaid funds, State health plans, standards for private health coverage for cessation programs.
- Smoking bans in (1) Government workplaces (2) Private workplaces (3) Schools and a range of other public places.

== Local governments ==
Many local governments have instituted smoking bans in public buildings.
