= Jawaharlal Nehru Cancer Hospital & Research Centre =

Geography
- Location: Bhopal, India
- Coordinates: 23.273298°N 77.380603°E

Organisation
- Type: Specialist

Services
- Speciality: Oncology

History
- Opened: 1995

Links
- Lists: Hospitals in India

Jawaharlal Nehru Cancer Hospital & Research Centre is a private cancer care hospital and research centre in Bhopal, India. It was founded in 1995 by Madhya Pradesh Cancer Chikitsa Evam Seva Samiti (meaning: Madhya Pradesh Cancer Treatment and Service Society).
