= Youth Tobacco Cessation Collaborative =

Policy group

The Youth Tobacco Cessation Collaborative (YTCC) was formed in the United States in 1998 to address the gap in knowledge about what cessation strategies are most effective in assisting youth to quit smoking. Collaborative members represent major organizations that fund research, program, and policy initiatives related to controlling youth tobacco use.

The National Blueprint for Action for youth and young adult tobacco-use cessation was published in the Spring of 2000 by the Youth Tobacco Cessation Collaborative. The youth cessation blueprint was developed as a consensus document to guide decisions regarding funding research and programs related to youth tobacco-use cessation, to reflect common goals and objectives among national organizations that fund such efforts, to help ensure that funding plans and programs across organizations build the strongest possible national efforts to support youth cessation, and to coordinate funding efforts.

The blueprint includes two-, five-, and 10-year objectives and funding strategies for research, implementation, and support and demand. Since publishing the blueprint, collaborative members have worked successfully to collectively address many of the needs identified in the blueprint, with a focus on its two-year objectives.

Among the more significant and important developments are the relationships that have formed among the collaborative organizations, the increase in collaboration across organizations, the co-funding of research and other projects, and the increase in attention to the issue of cessation among youth. In addition, the blueprint approach has become a model for other activities such as the National Blueprint for Disseminating and Implementing Evidence-Based Clinical and Community Strategies to Promote Tobacco-Use Cessation and the National Partnership to Help Pregnant Smokers Quit’s Action Plan (May 2002).

== Blueprint goal ==
The ten-year goal of the National Blueprint is to ensure that every young tobacco user (age 12–24) has access to appropriate and effective cessation interventions by the year 2010.

The Collaborative recognizes that there is a need to explore and address the cessation needs and interests among different segments of the population of young tobacco users, defined by factors such as:

- Different stages of tobacco use (from experimentation to addiction);
- Varying patterns of regular use (across times of days, days of the week, and seasons of the year);
- Use of different types of tobacco products;
- Different development stages of adolescence;
- Cultural and demographic difference (e.g. gender, race and ethnicity, social groups, and geographic location);
- Differences in life points or settings (e.g. school, college, workplace, incarceration, shelters);
- Co-morbidities with mental health conditions (e.g. attention deficit disorder, depression)
- Use of multiple substances.

In addition, it must be recognized that youth considering quitting do so within the context of other competing needs (e.g. family or living situation) and societal influences (e.g. accessibility to tobacco products). The Collaborative affirms the need to examine a broad range of possible interventions including individual, interpersonal, and organizational approaches. The Collaborative also encourages the involvement of youth in efforts to reach the objectives articulated in the National Blueprint for Action.

In order to reach the ten year goal, a range of needs must be addressed in funding and conducting research, in developing and supporting proven interventions, in implementing and maintaining policy changes, in increasing public awareness of and support for youth tobacco-use cessation, and in raising young tobacco-users’ interests in cessation.

== Achievements ==
To provide an update on the accomplishments of its work, YTCC publishes a “highlights” document that outlines activity of the collaborative toward its short- and long-term goals. These activity highlights illustrate just some of the progress that has been made. Although progress is significant, more attention to this issue is needed.

== YTCC members ==
Collaborative members represent major organizations that fund research, program, and policy initiatives related to controlling youth tobacco use.
