= Tobacco River =

Tobacco River may refer to:

- The Tobacco River (Keweenaw County, Michigan), on the Upper Peninsula of Michigan in the United States
- The Tobacco River (Tittabawassee River), on the Lower Peninsula of Michigan in the United States
