= Old Tobacco =

Old Tobacco was the English name given to a Piankeshaw chief who lived near Post Vincennes during the American Revolution.

Old Tobacco may have been the father of an influential chief known as Young Tobacco.

When Captain Leonard Helm came to Vincennes representing Colonel George Rogers Clark, he imitated Clark's presentation in Cahokia by presenting two belts for the Piankeshaw to choose from: a red belt representing war and a green one representing peace. Old Tobacco was upset with the presentation of good and evil together, and he kicked the belts from Helm's hands.

At some point, Old Tobacco sold land farther north on the Wabash River, where Wea villages were located. When Lt-Governor Henry Hamilton led an expedition to Vincennes in 1778, he received several complaints from native villages about Old Tobacco, and burned down Old Tobacco's cession of lands as it did not comply with British law.

Other natives informed Hamilton that both Old Tobacco and Young Tobacco favored the Americans against the British. If Old Tobacco committed any acts of resistance to the British crown, Hamilton did not record it in his journal.
