= Massachusetts Tobacco Cessation and Prevention Program =

The Massachusetts Tobacco Cessation and Prevention Program (MTCP) is an anti-tobacco program run by the Massachusetts Department of Public Health with the goal of decreasing tobacco prevalence in the state of Massachusetts. MTCP has four main components: preventing youth smoking, protecting against second hand smoke, assisting current smokers with quitting, and eliminating tobacco related disparities. Since the program began in, adult smoking rates have declined from 22.6% in 1993 to 16.1% in 2008, allowing Massachusetts the 4th lowest smoking rates in the country.

== History ==
Massachusetts Tobacco Cessation and Prevention Program (MTCP), previously known as the Massachusetts Tobacco Control Program, began in November 1992 after residents of Massachusetts voted to increase the excise tax on cigarettes (from $.26 to $.51 per pack) in order to fund health related programs. The money raised from the excise tax went to support the Massachusetts Health Protection Fund and around 40% of that money went towards financing the MTPC. Within a year, the MTPC had created several major strategies to lower smoking rate. These initiative began with a major media campaign which used television, newspapers, and radio, as well as other types of media, to educated the citizens of Massachusetts about the negative side effects of smoking and to inform them of new programs being developed to lower smoking prevalence within the state.

The MTPC is funded entirely through taxes on cigarettes and smokeless tobacco products. Between the years of 1995 and 1997, MTCP operated on an average yearly budget of $40 million. By 2009, MTCP had reduced its yearly budget to $12.2 million.

== Goals ==
The main goal of MTCP is for all Massachusetts residents to live tobacco free. More, specifically, MTCP has four major goals under which they structure their various programs. These include youth smoking prevention, assistance in quitting smoking, protection against second hand smoke, and elimination of tobacco related disparities. The MTCP has focused on different aspects of these goals throughout the seventeen years the program has been in effect. Over that time frame, they have garnered success in decreasing second hand smoke and smoking rates, especially within the youth population.

== Youth smoking prevention ==
Youth smoking prevention has been one of the major goals of MTCP since the beginning. In general, MTPC implements youth prevention programs through education, supporting youth civic engagement, and educating retailers about the dangers of selling to minors. MTPC has also increased enforcement of laws against selling tobacco products to minors.

One of the more aggressive forms of youth smoking prevention has been the strict enforcement of laws that prevent sale of tobacco products to minors. Massachusetts has been extremely successful in decreasing youth tobacco sales. Illegal tobacco sales to minors dropped form 44% in 1994 to 11% in 1999. Additionally, illegal sales of tobacco were cut in half from 2006 to 2007.

Youth prevention programs also play a key role in lowering smoking rates among minors. Throughout MTCP, many anti-tobacco programs have been created to encourage youth to avoid using tobacco products. One example of such a program is known as The Eighty-Four . The Eighty Four refers to the 84% of youth in Massachusetts that do not use tobacco products. The Eighty Four is a movement created by MTCP to encourage youth to actively participate in fighting tobacco use. The Eighty Four maintains local chapters in high schools throughout the state, as well as a youth friendly website on which high students can blog and participate in online discussions. The initiative also runs programs such as short film contests where students can actively be involved in helping prevent youth smoking. Through various programs and control measures throughout the state, MTCP has reduced youth smoking rates among high school students from 30% in 1993 to 16% in 2009.

== Assistance to quit smoking ==
MTCP provides assistance to smokers who want to quit smoking. It also encourages lower smoking rates through increased taxes on cigarettes and through distributing information on the harmful effects of smoking.

One of the largest initiatives of MTCP is the Massachusetts Smokers' Helpline. The smokers helpline is a toll-free helpline (1-800-TryToStop) that offers free referral and counseling to Massachusetts residents who are trying to quit smoking. They have English, Spanish, and Portuguese speaking counselors available. In addition to the helpline, MTCP has created an interactive website (www.TryToStop.org) where smokers can get information and tools to assist in their efforts to quit smoking. The website contains information in nine different languages.

Another interactive website called Quitworks (www.quitworks.org) is for smokers referred by health care providers. Quitworks was created as a joint effort between MTCP and major health care insurance companies in Massachusetts.

MTCP has continued over the years to encourage smokers to quit through increasing taxes on cigarettes. In 1993, when the program began, taxes were increased from $.26 to $.51 per pack. They were raised to $.76 per pack in 1996 and $1.51 per pack in 2002. An additional $1 tax increase was implemented on July 1, 2008. To accompany the most recent tax increase, MTCP gave away a two-month supply of nicotine patches to smokers who wanted to quit. This program was advertised through MTCP helpline and health care providers.

== Protection against secondhand smoke ==
MTCP is committed to decreasing environmental tobacco smoke (ETS) in Massachusetts. Through smoking bans and educating the public on dangers of secondhand smoking, MTCP has been able to significantly reduce the amount of second hand smoke throughout the state. One of their first and most successful initiatives focused on creating smoke-free workplaces. They saw a significant decline in smoking in workplaces during the initial phases of the program and as of July 5, 2004, all workplaces in Massachusetts with any employees must be completely smoke-free. There have also been significant results from smoking bans in restaurants. Additionally, MTCP is encouraging smoke-free homes through educating the public.
