= British Columbia v Imperial Tobacco Canada Ltd =

Pivotal Canadian lawsuit against the tobacco industry

- Supreme Court of Canada

Hearing: June 8, 2005 Judgment: September 29, 2005
- Full case name: Imperial Tobacco Canada Limited et al. v. Her Majesty the Queen in Right of British Columbia
- Citations: [2005] 2 S.C.R. 473, 2005 SCC 49
- Prior history: Judgment for Respondent in the (Court of Appeal for British Columbia)
- Ruling: Appeal dismissed.

Holding
- The Act (Tobacco Damages and Health Care Costs Recovery Act) is constitutionally valid.

Court membership
- Chief Justice: Beverley McLachlin; Puisne Justices: John C. Major, Michel Bastarache, Ian Binnie, Louis LeBel, Marie Deschamps, Morris Fish, Rosalie Abella, Louise Charron

Reasons given
- Unanimous reasons by: Major J.

Laws applied
- Air Canada v. British Columbia, [1989] 1 S.C.R. 1161; Authorson v. Canada (Attorney General), [2003] 2 S.C.R. 40, 2003 SCC 39

British Columbia v Imperial Tobacco Canada Ltd, [2005] 2 S.C.R. 473, 2005 SCC 49, is a decision of the Supreme Court of Canada where the Court found that the provincial Tobacco Damages and Health Care Costs Recovery Act, which allowed the government to sue tobacco companies, was constitutionally valid. Imperial Tobacco Canada is an indirect subsidiary of British American Tobacco.

== Background ==
The British Columbia government passed the Tobacco Damages and Health Care Costs Recovery Act that granted the government power to sue tobacco manufacturers for breach of duty to recover costs on the health care system for people suffering from tobacco related illnesses. The tobacco companies sued under the Act challenged its constitutional validity.

On June 5, 2003, the Supreme Court of British Columbia found that the Act violated the territorial limits of provincial law and was unconstitutional. The Court of Appeal, in May 2004, overturned the decision on the basis that the pith and substance, i.e. the dominant characteristic, of the law fell under the property and civil rights provision of the Constitution Act, 1867. The challenge against judicial independence, and rule of law were also dismissed.

On June 22, 2004, Imperial Tobacco Canada appealed the case to the Supreme Court of Canada. On the same day, four other tobacco companies and the Canadian Tobacco Manufacturers' Council also filed for appeal. On December 17, 2004, the Supreme Court agreed to hear the case and it upheld the decision of the Court of Appeal on September 29, 2005.

Three issues were put to the Court:

1. Is the Act ultra vires the province by reason of extraterritoriality?
2. Is the Act constitutionally invalid as being inconsistent with judicial independence?
3. Is the Act constitutionally invalid for violating the rule of law?

The Court answered "no" to all of these issues.

== Opinion of the Court ==
The unanimous opinion was written by Major J.

=== Extraterritoriality ===
Similar to the reasoning of the Court of Appeal, Major found that the pith and substance of the Act was within the authority of the province under section 92(13) of the Constitution Act, 1867. The subject matter of the Act, compensation for health costs, and the effect, suing companies who harmed those in the province, all point at a valid provincial law. No other province has a greater relationship to the cause of action. The duty breached by the companies in the manufacturing and selling of tobacco has little significance, Major said, on the connection between the cause of action and the province.

=== Judicial independence ===
At no point during an action under the Act is the independence of the judiciary interfered with. The Court dismissed the suggestion that the shift in burden to the accused or the unconventional rules of procedure and evidence created by the Act have any effect on independence.

=== Rule of law ===
The tobacco companies had claimed that the retrospectivity and retroactivity of the Act violated the rule of law by creating an unfair trial. Further, they felt that legislation should neither target a particular sector nor confer special privileges on the government.

The rule of law, as protected by the Constitution, does not require that Acts ensure a fair civil trial or avoid giving the government advantages.

The Supreme Court held that accepting this amorphous conception of the rule of law would render several provisions of the Charter redundant because they are more narrowly formulated.

== Significance ==
The Court limited the four unwritten principles of the Constitution, which were outlined in Reference re Secession of Quebec. It reaffirmed that a textual basis for review must be submitted because of the stability and predictability provided by a written constitution.

"Because of this ruling, Canada became the first country outside the United States where governments can sue tobacco manufacturers to recover smoking-related healthcare costs; as much as $10 billion in costs was at stake in this B.C. case. Manitoba, New Brunswick, Newfoundland and Labrador, Nova Scotia, Ontario, and Saskatchewan have since drafted or adopted legislation based on this B.C. model."

== See also ==
- List of Supreme Court of Canada cases (McLachlin Court)
