= Young Tobacco =

Young Tobacco was the English name given to a Piankeshaw chief who lived near Post Vincennes during the American Revolution. His influence seems to have extended beyond his own village to all those along the Wabash River.

George Rogers Clark, in his memoir, refers to him as "Tobacco's Son", and British Lt-Governor Henry Hamilton's journal often refers to "Old Tobacco and his son." The relationship of the two chiefs, Old Tobacco and Young Tobacco, seems probable but is not certain. It may be that the British and Americans presumed Piankesaw leadership passed from father to son, but this was not common among Miami tribes.

Clark's memoir describes Young Tobacco as being very dedicated towards the American cause, declaring himself to be a "big knife". When Hamilton recaptures Vincennes and occupies Fort Sackville with the American prisoner Captain Leonard Helm, Young Tobacco declares openly that Helm is his brother, and voluntarily imprisons himself to stay with Helm. Knowing the influence of Young Tobacco among the area natives, Hamilton offers him several gifts to regain his favor, which Tobacco accepts for himself and Helm to use. Hamilton does not describe these events in his journal.

As Clark and his army nears Vincennes to recapture it, Young Tobacco musters a large band of native warriors and requests permission to join Clark's army. This offer is declined, but Tobacco continues to favor the Americans during the siege of Fort Sackville.

Hamilton's journal offers a contrasting view of Young Tobacco. Rather than being an open supporter of the Americans, Young Tobacco seems to favor whoever is in power at the time. He offers excuses to Hamilton for his lack of loyalty when the residents of Vincennes first mobilized in favor of the Americans. In a war council meeting, Young Tobacco blames this on other chiefs for not coming to his support, and declares that he was too weak to resist the Americans and too young to make such decisions on his own. Hamilton seemed suspicious of Young Tobacco in his journal, but does not describe any open acts in support of the Americans.

After the Americans had secured Vincennes, they had trouble with Delaware along the White River. Clark ordered a punitive expedition against them, but Young Tobacco brokered a peace deal. He accepted responsibility for future Delaware raids but promised to "chastise them" if they again attacked Americans.

Clark says that Young Tobacco died two years after the battle for Fort Sackville, and was carried to Cahokia and buried with military honors.
