= Tobacco and other drugs =

Association between tobacco and other drug use

An association between tobacco and other drug use has been well established. The nature of this association remains unclear. The two main theories, which are not mutually exclusive, are the phenotypic causation (gateway) model and the correlated liabilities model. The causation model argues that smoking is a primary influence on future drug use, while the correlated liabilities model argues that smoking and other drug use are predicated on genetic or environmental factors.

== Causation model ==
A 1994 report from the Center on Addiction and Substance Abuse at Columbia University found a correlation between the use of cigarettes and alcohol and the subsequent use of cannabis. The report asserted a link between alcohol and cannabis use and the subsequent use of illicit drugs like cocaine. It found that when younger children used, the more often they use them, the more likely they were to use cocaine, heroin, hallucinogens and other illicit drugs. The report concludes that the data is already robust enough to make a strong case to step up efforts to prevent childhood use of cigarettes and to take firm steps to reduce children’s access to these "gateway drugs".

Researchers have found that craving nicotine also increases craving for illicit drugs among people who use substances who smoke tobacco, and this suggests that people who smoke in drug rehabilitation programs may be less successful in abstaining from other substances than people who do not smoke while in rehabilitation.

In mice, nicotine increased the probability of later consumption of cocaine. The experiments permitted concrete conclusions on the underlying molecular biological alteration in the brain. The biological changes in mice correspond to the epidemiological observations in humans that nicotine consumption is coupled to an increased probability of later use of cocaine.

== Correlative model ==
Smoking may have a genetic predisposing factor; one 1990 study posited that 52% of the variance in smoking behaviour is attributable to heritable factors. The concept received support from a large-scale genetic analysis of 2016 that showed a genetic basis for the connection between the prevalence of cigarette smoking and cannabis use during the life of a person.

== See also ==
- Gateway drug theory
