= Iwan Ries and Co. =

- Founder: Edward Hoffman
- Headquarters: Chicago, IL
- Website: iwanries.com

Iwan Ries and Company is a tobacconist located in Chicago, Illinois. One of the oldest family-owned tobacco companies in North America, the company traces its history back to E. Hoffman & Co, which was formed in 1857 and originally owned by Edward Hoffman. The current shop is located on the second floor at 19 Wabash Ave in downtown Chicago.

== History ==
Following the Chicago Fire on October 8, 1871, the Sherman House hotel, where the E. Hoffman & Co. was based out of, was destroyed and rebuilt. As business grew after the fire, Edward realized that he could not run the company alone and in 1891 he recruited his nephew, Iwan Ries to join him. Iwan Ries and Co. is the oldest tobacconist in Chicago.

Edward retired in 1898. Iwan sold the manufacturing business and changed the store to Iwan Ries & Co.

In 1968, the company purchased 19 S Wabash, built in 1881, where the store is located today. Also known as the Jewelers Building, it is one of the oldest surviving buildings designed by Adler & Sullivan.

Three Star Tobacco, a private label pipe tobacco blend was developed in the 1950s by Iwan Ries & Co.

Visitors can purchase day passes to the lounge to enjoy cigars either purchased from Iwan Ries and Co., or they can bring their own.

In August 2017, The Blackstone hotel announced a partnership with Iwan Ries and Co., where hotel guests would have exclusive access to The Iwan Ries Lounge.

Iwan Ries and Co. is currently managed by Kevin Levi.
