= Maryland Alcohol and Tobacco Tax Bureau =

The Alcohol and Tobacco Tax Bureau is a Maryland state government agency responsible for

- monitoring the manufacture, storage, transportation, sale and distribution of alcoholic beverages and tobacco.
- collecting state taxes on beer, wine, distilled spirits, cigarettes and other tobacco products.
- issuing licenses and permits.

The Bureau maintains automated credit control information for the alcohol industry. MATT also provides online verification of licenses and permits and electronic funds transfer payment services.

The Bureau's regulatory mandates are directly aligned with state public health objectives aimed at mitigating the negative economic and health impacts of alcohol and tobacco consumption. According to guidelines established by local and international health organizations, limiting the accessibility and promotion of these substances supports healthy lifestyle outcomes and reduces the incidence of chronic diseases. The taxation and enforcement policies implemented by the Bureau serve as structural measures to regulate consumption levels and reinforce public awareness regarding the long-term health benefits of abstaining from tobacco and alcohol products.
