= Langkum =

Dusunic traditional plug underneath tobacco

Langkum or known by its various names of sintilon, sontel, suntil, tesis, tisis or isis is a traditional moist shredded tobacco popular among the indigenous Kadazan-Dusun and Rungus elderly of Sabah, Malaysia.

== Features ==
Unlike regular tobacco, langkum is not smoked, but instead, a small pinch is placed or tucked between the gum and the lip or cheek (which are called bersuntil/sontel or sinni) and left to sit or gently chewed. It has a distinctively sharp, spicy flavour compared to standard coarse tobacco, which has long served as a social tradition among the indigenous Kadazan-Dusun and Rungus and a part of their everyday community life, gatherings, or work, especially among older generations in districts like Tambunan, Ranau, Kota Marudu, Papar, Penampang, Tuaran, and Kudat. It is notoriously strong, often causing immediate physical reactions such as a burning sensation on the lips, dizziness, or lightheadedness especially among first-time or inexperienced users.
