= Jewelers Building (1882) =

- U.S. National Register of Historic Places
- Chicago Landmark
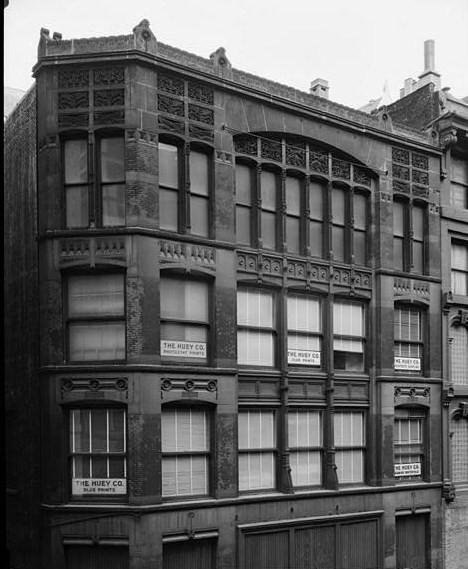
- (1964)

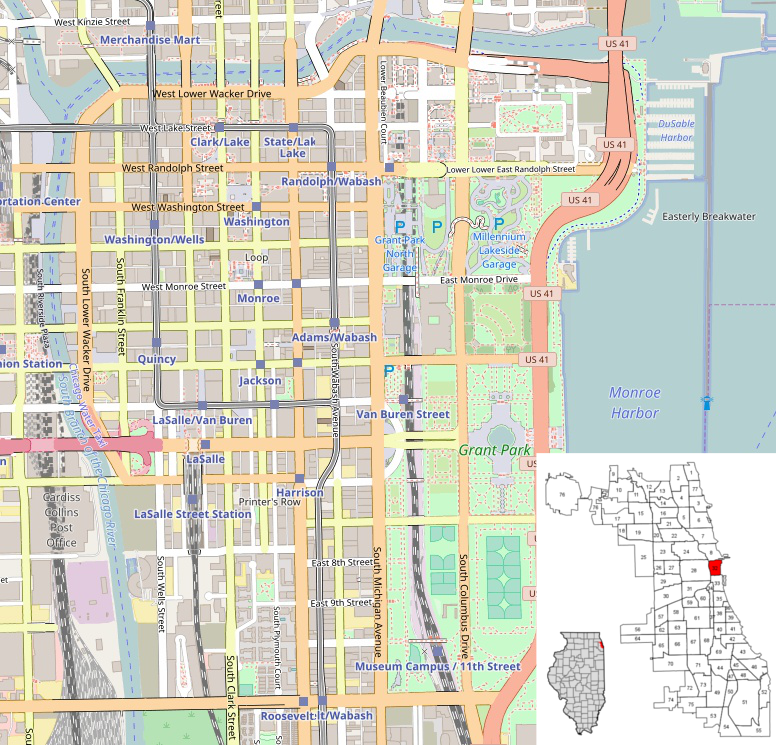
- Location within Chicago Loop
- Location: 15–17 S. Wabash Avenue, Chicago, Illinois, US
- Coordinates: 41°52′53″N 87°37′33.01″W
- Built: 1881–82
- Architect: Adler & Sullivan
- NRHP reference No.: 74000752

Significant dates
- Added to NRHP: August 7, 1974
- Designated CHICL: December 18, 1981

The Jewelers Building is at 15–17 Wabash Avenue between East Monroe and East Madison Streets in the Loop community area of Chicago in Cook County, Illinois, United States. It was built in 1881–82 and was designed by Dankmar Adler and Louis Sullivan. It is the only example of the early work of Adler & Sullivan that survives in the Loop. It is also known as the Iwan Ries Building, and the "Little" Jewelers Building to distinguish from the larger structure at 35 East Wacker Drive, which was built in 1925–27.

The building is a common loft building in construction and plan, but its facade departs dramatically from others of its type. An open exterior, using cast iron mullions rather than masonry piers in the central bay, and Sullivan's stylized floral ornament provide distinction.

The building was listed on the National Register of Historic Places on August 7, 1974, and was designated a Chicago Landmark on December 18, 1981. It is located in Chicago's Jewelers Row District.

== See also ==
- National Register of Historic Places listings in Central Chicago
