= Tobacco Road =

Tobacco Road may refer to:

== Prose ==
- Tobacco Road (novel) (1932), by Erskine Caldwell
  - Tobacco Road (play) (1933), by Jack Kirkland
  - Tobacco Road (film) (1941), directed by John Ford

== Music ==
- "Tobacco Road" (song) (1960s), by John D. Loudermilk
  - Also recorded by The Nashville Teens in 1964
  - Also recorded by David Lee Roth on the 1986 album Eat 'Em and Smile
- Tobacco Road (Bobbie Gentry album), from the 1968 album The Delta Sweete
- Tobacco Road (Common Market album)
- Tobacco Road (Jack McDuff album)
- Tobacco Road, an album by Lou Rawls
- Tobacco Road, a song by Eric Burdon and War (band)
- Tobacco Road, a song by The Blues Magoos on the 1968 album Psychedelic Lollypop

== Other uses ==
- Tobacco Road (bar), in Miami, Florida
- Tobacco Road (rivalry), a rivalry between four universities in North Carolina
- Tobacco Road FC, an American soccer team based in Durham, North Carolina
- Tobacco Road Formation, a geologic formation in Georgia
- Tobacco Road, a road in Augusta, Georgia
