= Tobacco Damages and Health Care Costs Recovery Act =

Anti-tobacco law in British Columbia, Canada

British Columbia's Tobacco Damages and Health Care Costs Recovery Act was approved by the Supreme Court of Canada, opening the door for the province to sue cigarette makers, in order to recover the billions spent on inflicted healthcare costs. The act came into force in July 2000.

== See also ==
- Imperial Tobacco v. British Columbia
