= Alp Supply Co. =

Nicotine and caffeiene pouch company

- Type: Private
- Industry: Nicotine pouches Caffeine pouches
- Founder: Tucker Carlson
- Owners: Tucker Carlson Network; Turning Point Brands
- Website: https://alppouch.com/

Alp (stylized as "ALP") is a brand of nicotine and caffeine pouches created by Tucker Carlson and Turning Point Brands, a subsidiary of American conservative group Turning Point USA. Alp pouches are designed to be placed between the lip and gums of the user, allowing the product to be to be absorbed into the bloodstream through oral soft tissue.

Alp pouches are marketed towards adult male users, particularly within conservative spaces. Carlson, who was formerly a "Zynfluencer" (someone who promotes usage of Zyn nicotine pouches), co-founded Alp as a right-wing alternative after Zyn donated to the campaign of Democratic presidential candidate Kamala Harris during the 2024 election. Alp is also marketed to the Make America Healthy Again movement as a healthier alternative to snus and chewing tobacco. However, these claims have been questioned by health experts, particularly concerning usage among children under 18.

== Alp Drifters ==
In 2026, Alp released a limited edition variation of their nicotine pouches called Alp Drifters. The pouch flavors are described as "fruit forward with an icy finish", with flavors such as Blueberry Lemonade Ice and Mango Freeze. Sometime in March of that year, a shipment containing more than 378,000 tins of Alp Drifters was stolen from a truck heading from California to Kentucky. A $100,000 bounty was placed by Tucker Carlson for any information regarding the stolen goods, and the following month the shipment was recovered by the Los Angeles Sheriff's Department.

== Caffeine Break ==
While Alp primarily focuses on their nicotine pouches, they also have a sub-brand of caffeine pouches referred to as Alp Caffeine Break. These pouches do not contain nicotine, instead containing 50 milligrams of caffeine. Caffeine pouches do not have any age restrictions, and can be purchased in store by users under 21.
