= Nicokick =

American e-Commerce company

- Industry: E-commerce, Nicotine products
- Headquarters: Washington, D.C., United States
- Area served: United States
- Parent: Haypp Group AB
- Website: nicokick.com

Nicokick is a United States-based e-commerce company specializing in the online retail of oral nicotine products, primarily tobacco leaf-free and synthetic nicotine pouches. The platform operates a direct-to-consumer model and restricts sales to adults aged 21 and older. Nicokick is owned and operated by Haypp Group, a Swedish company listed on Nasdaq First North Growth Market.

== Background ==
Nicokick operates as a United States-based online retailer of oral nicotine products, primarily tobacco leaf-free and synthetic nicotine pouches. The platform developed its product catalog, logistics network, and customer base over time, becoming a notable brand within the Haypp Group portfolio.

Nicokick ships to most US states, with distribution adapted to meet applicable federal and state-level regulations, including age verification requirements, health warning mandates, and jurisdiction-specific flavor restrictions.

== Operations ==
Nicokick is headquartered in Washington, D.C., and operates a warehouse and logistics hub in Houston, Texas. The company fulfills orders through partnerships with FedEx, UPS, and USPS.

Customers are required to verify that they are 21 years of age or older before completing a purchase and upon delivery of their order, in accordance with US tobacco retail laws. Although nicotine pouches do not contain tobacco leaf and are not classified as tobacco products, they are subject to the same federal and state distribution, age verification, and delivery regulations as tobacco products in the United States.

== Products ==
Nicokick's catalog includes tobacco leaf-free nicotine pouches, which contain nicotine derived from tobacco but without tobacco leaf material, available in various flavors and nicotine strengths. The platform also carries synthetic nicotine pouches, which contain lab-created rather than tobacco-derived nicotine.

Additional product categories include nicotine gums and oral products designed to address side effects associated with nicotine use. Nicokick does not sell combustible tobacco products, electronic cigarettes, or vaping devices.

Nicokick’s product testing and transparency efforts are reflected in the publication of nicotine pouch laboratory results, made publicly available through the independent NicoLeaks platform, which hosts Eurofins laboratory reports on product composition and quality standards.

== Editorial platform ==
Nicokick maintains an editorial platform called Pouch Perfect, which features articles aimed at adult nicotine users on product information and category developments, and also publishes a recurring Nicotine Pouch & Oral Nicotine Report, a market analysis drawing on consumer survey findings and purchasing data about oral nicotine use in the United States.

== Ownership and structure ==
Nicokick is owned and operated by Haypp Group AB, a Swedish e‑commerce group headquartered in Stockholm, which operates multiple online platforms including Nicokick.com. Haypp Group AB also manages several other oral nicotine brands and platforms in Europe and North America.

== See also ==
- Nicotine pouch
- Tobacco harm reduction
- Oral tobacco
