= ALP =

ALP or AlP may refer to:

== Science and technology ==
=== Chemicals and particles ===
- AlP, molecular formula for aluminium phosphide
- Alkaline phosphatase, an enzyme
- Axion-like particle, pseudo Nambu-Goldstone boson

=== Computer science ===
- Algorithmic probability
- Association for Logic Programming

=== Computing ===
- IBM ALP, Assembly Language Processor, for 32-bit OS/2
- Access Linux Platform, a mobile operating system
- Appliance Link Protocol, used by Sun Ray computers

== Arts and entertainment ==
- Alien Loves Predator, a webcomic
- Anna Livia Plurabelle, character in the book Finnegans Wake
- Arthur Loves Plastic, American electronic music band

== Political parties ==
- Alberta Liberal Party, in Canada
- All Liberian Party, in Liberia
- American Labor Party (defunct), in the US
- Antigua Labour Party, in Antigua and Barbuda
- Australian Labor Party, in Australia

== Transport ==
- ALP (automobile), manufactured in Belgium in 1920
- Several locomotives:
  - ABB ALP-44
  - Bombardier ALP-45DP
  - Bombardier ALP-46
- Air Alpes, a defunct French airline
- Aleppo International Airport, Syria
- Alpine (Amtrak station), Texas, US
- Althorpe railway station, North Lincolnshire, England
- Alphington railway station, Melbourne, Australia

== Other uses ==
- Aerial Ladder Platform, a type of firefighting apparatus
- Afghan Local Police
- Association of Lincoln Presenters, an American historical society
- Average Labor Productivity
- Alpine skiing at the Winter Olympics (International Olympic Committee code ALP)

== See also ==
- Alp (disambiguation)
- Alps (disambiguation)
- ALPS (disambiguation)
