= Alp =

Alp may refer to:

- Alp, any mountain in the Alps
- Alp (name), including people so named
- Alp (folklore), a creature of German myth
- Alp, Spain, a town in Catalonia
- Alp (river), Switzerland
- Alpine pasture or alp
- Alpine meadow or alp
- Alp Supply Co., a brand of nicotine and caffeine pouches
- Alp or Alıp, an Ottoman title

== See also ==
- ALP (disambiguation)
- Alp 2500, a ski resort in Catalonia, Spain
- Alps (disambiguation)
- ALPS (disambiguation)
