= Minami Alps (disambiguation) =

Minami Alps (南アルプス, Minami Arupusu, meaning "Southern Alps" in Japanese) may refer to:

- Akaishi Mountains or Minami-Alps, Japan
- Minami-Alps, Yamanashi, a city in Yamanashi Prefecture, Japan
- Minami Alps National Park, in the Akaishi Mountains, Honshū, Japan

== See also ==
- Japanese Alps
- Southern Alps (disambiguation)
