= Iqos =

Heated tobacco products by Philip Morris International

IQOS

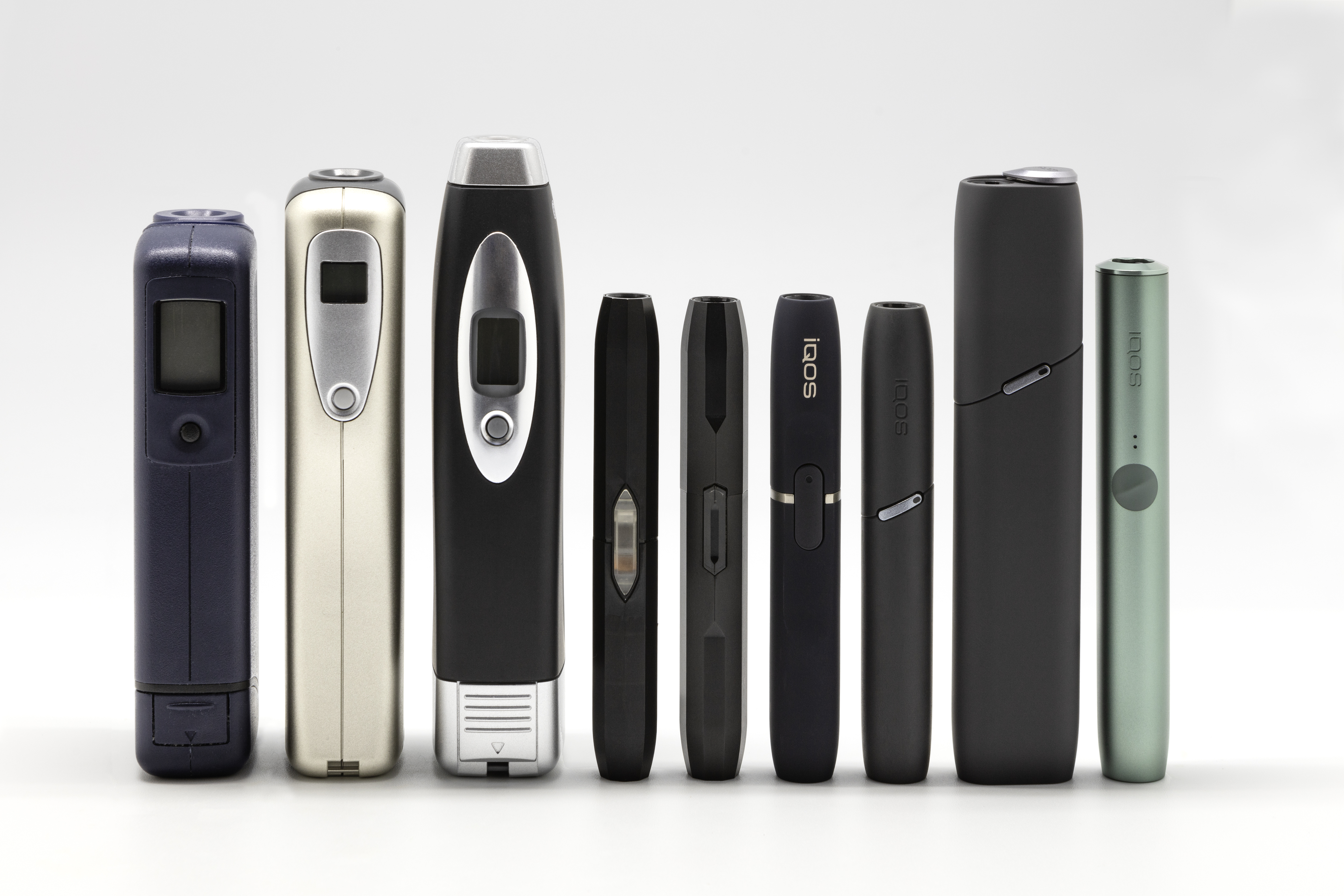
- Iqos devices, from Accord to Iluma
- Product type: Heated tobacco products
- Current owner: Philip Morris International
- Introduced: 2014; 12 years ago
- Related brands: Veev
- Markets: Worldwide
- Website: https://www.iqos.com

IQOS (/ˈaɪkoʊs/ EYE-kohs) is a line of heated tobacco products designed to be used with tobacco and nicotine-containing consumables. They are manufactured by Philip Morris International (PMI). The brand was first introduced in November 2014 in Japan and Italy.

In 2020, the U.S. Food and Drug Administration authorized PMI to make "reduced exposure" marketing claims for Iqos in the United States, although this was accompanied with controversy, as Reuters published documents and testimonies from former employees alleging irregularities in the clinical trials.

According to a review by the World Health Organization, the existing evidence does not indicate that people smoking heated tobacco products are exposed to less harm from tobacco-related diseases compared to people smoking conventional cigarettes. According to Philip Morris’s own estimates, heated tobacco products generate a net profit margin 2.6 times higher than that of conventional cigarettes.

== History ==
=== Prototypes and early devices ===
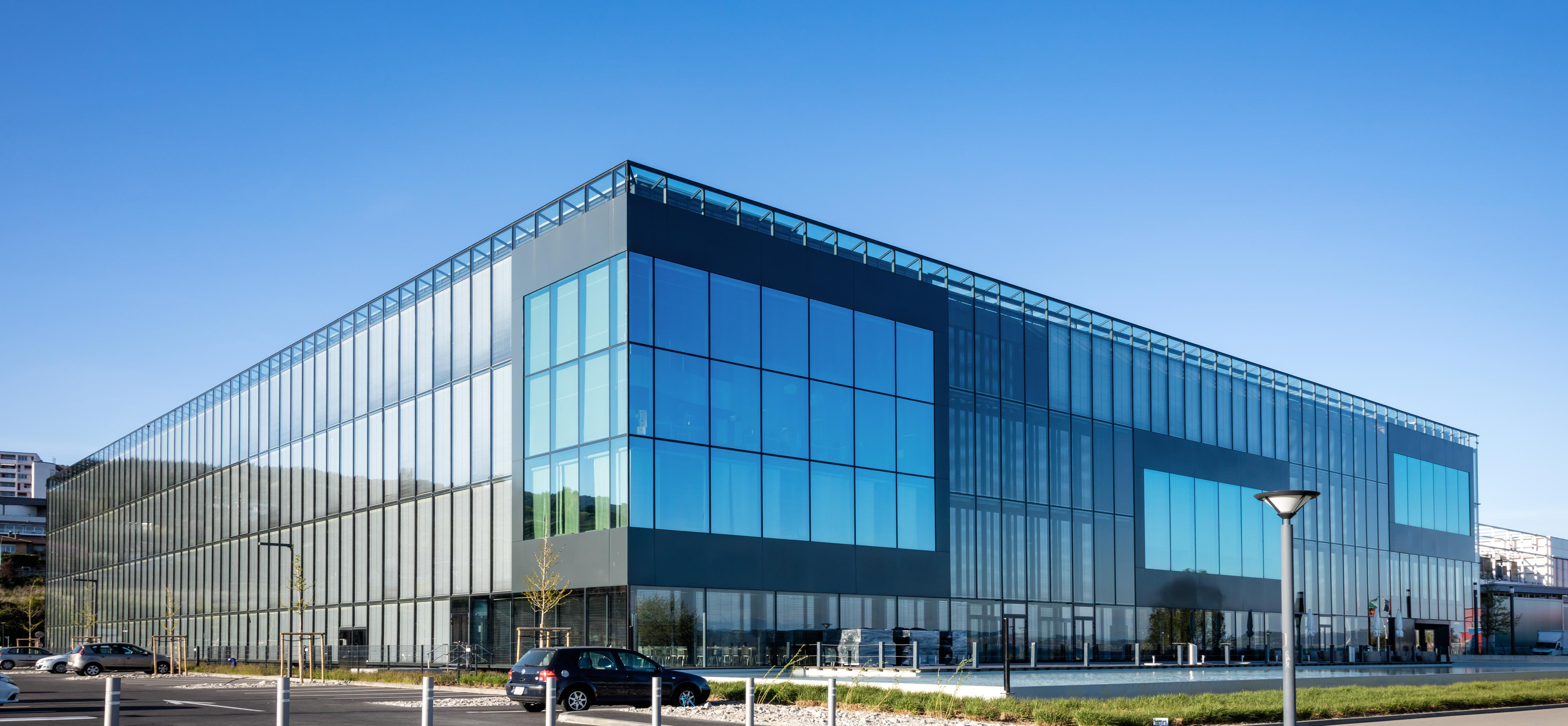
'The Cube', Philip Morris International's main research and development facility, in Neuchâtel, Switzerland.

Alternatives to cigarettes have been researched for several decades. In 1990, Philip Morris presented its first prototype of a device for heating tobacco without burning it (Project Beta). The company then put two devices on the market intended to heat a cigarette while limiting the combustion of tobacco: "Accord", a device sold in the United States from 1998 to 2006 (the device was also released in Japan under the name "Oasis"), then the "Heatbar", a device sold by the company's international subsidiary launched in 2006 in Australia and Switzerland, before being withdrawn from the market.

One year after its 2008 spin-off from the Altria Group, Philip Morris International opened a $200+ million R&D facility in Neuchâtel, Switzerland for research around "reduced risk" products and alternatives to cigarettes. Between 2011 and 2014, PMI carried out various strategic operations in this direction, including purchasing patents, acquiring companies, and developing partnerships. In 2011, PMI acquired a smoke-free technology from inventors at Duke University including Professor Jed Rose, a leading expert in nicotine addiction research who was instrumental in the development of the nicotine patch. In 2013, PMI announced an agreement with Altria to sell Altria's e-vapor technology outside the U.S., with Altria gaining exclusive rights to sell future alternative heated tobacco products developed by Philip Morris International in the U.S.

=== Launch of Iqos ===
In January 2014, Philip Morris International announced an investment of €500 million to build a factory near Bologna, Italy, dedicated to the production of heated tobacco products. In November 2014 the first version of Iqos was released, first marketed in Nagoya, Japan, and Milan, Italy, before being gradually rolled out to other countries.

Starting in 2016, Philip Morris began heavily focusing commercial efforts on nicotine-containing cigarette alternative products. In 2016, PMI launched Iqos Mesh in the UK. The next generation of Iqos ("Iqos 3" and "Iqos 3 Multi") was launched in Tokyo in October 2018 and then in other markets around the world.

In 2017, the smoke-free segment generated sales of $3.6 billion for PMI (13% of its overall sales), compared to $64 million in 2015. By the beginning of 2018, Iqos brand products accounted for 15% of the tobacco industry's market share in Japan. By 2020, Iqos accounted for 5.5% of the global tobacco market while being available in 52 countries only, this number jumping to almost 70 a year later. According to PMI financial releases, sales of smoke-free products represented nearly 30% of the company's revenue during the first quarter of 2021, and 40% by the end of 2023, with Iqos revenues surpassing those of cigarette brand Marlboro.

In January 2020, PMI and South Korea's KT&G announced a partnership for the international distribution of Lil, a hybrid e-cigarette/heated tobacco product, as part of the Iqos portfolio. The following summer, PMI rebranded Mesh as Veev and launched it in New Zealand before gradually extending distribution to other countries. Iluma, a new system using induction heating technology, was launched in Japan in August 2021.

In July 2020, the US FDA granted Philip Morris International an authorization to make "reduced exposure" marketing claims, considering that the Iqos tobacco heating system met the requirements for designation as a Modified Risk Tobacco Product, the second set of products ever authorized after Swedish Match's General Snus. The FDA explicitly stated that the product should not be considered as "safe or FDA approved."

On 17 April 2026, the FDA renewed modified risk granted orders for two Iqos system holders and chargers and three HeatSticks variants, allowing exposure-modification claims while stating that the orders did not permit marketing implying FDA endorsement or product safety.

== Construction ==
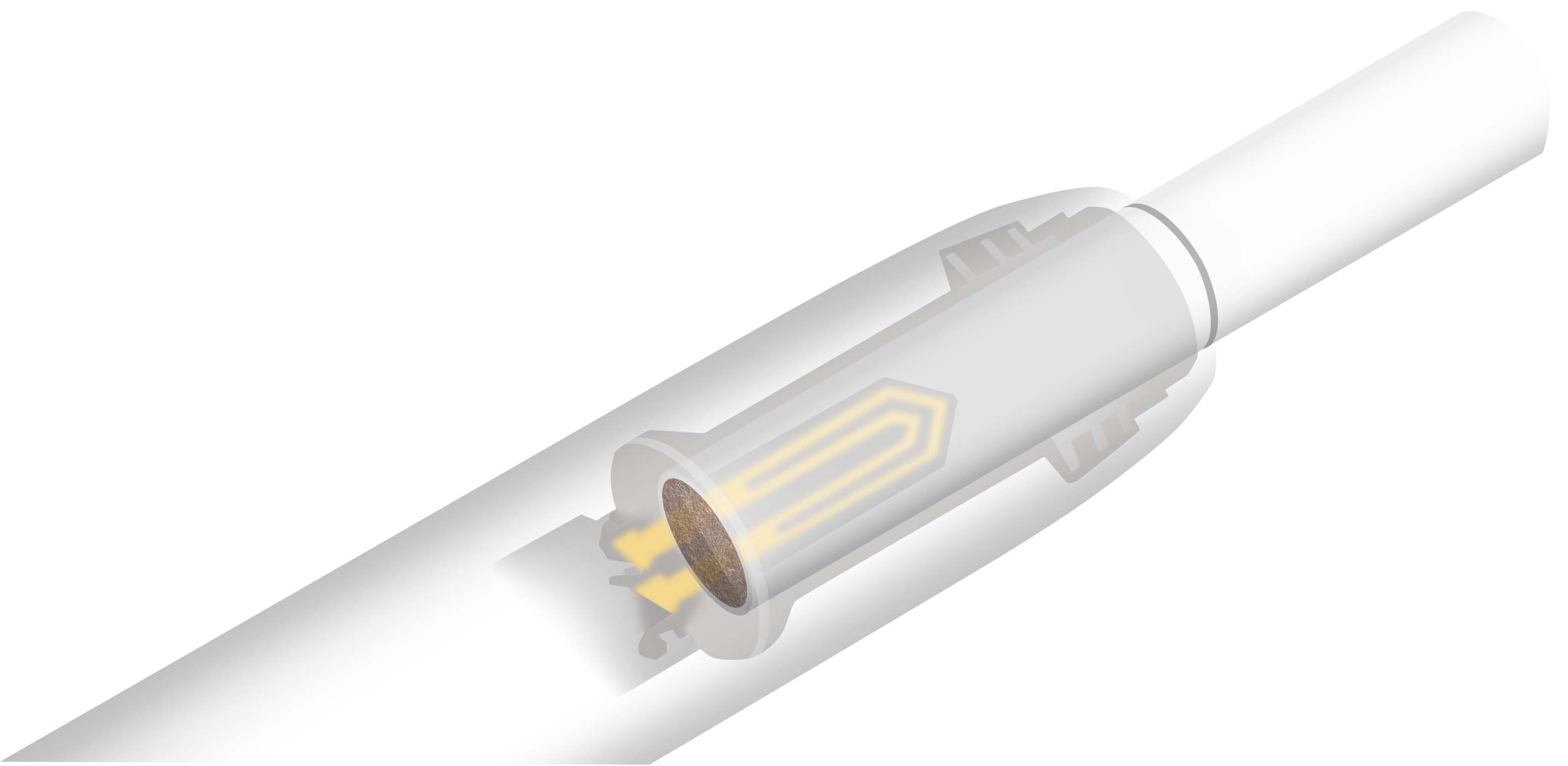
An early version of IQOS that heated tobacco through a blade fixed in the device.

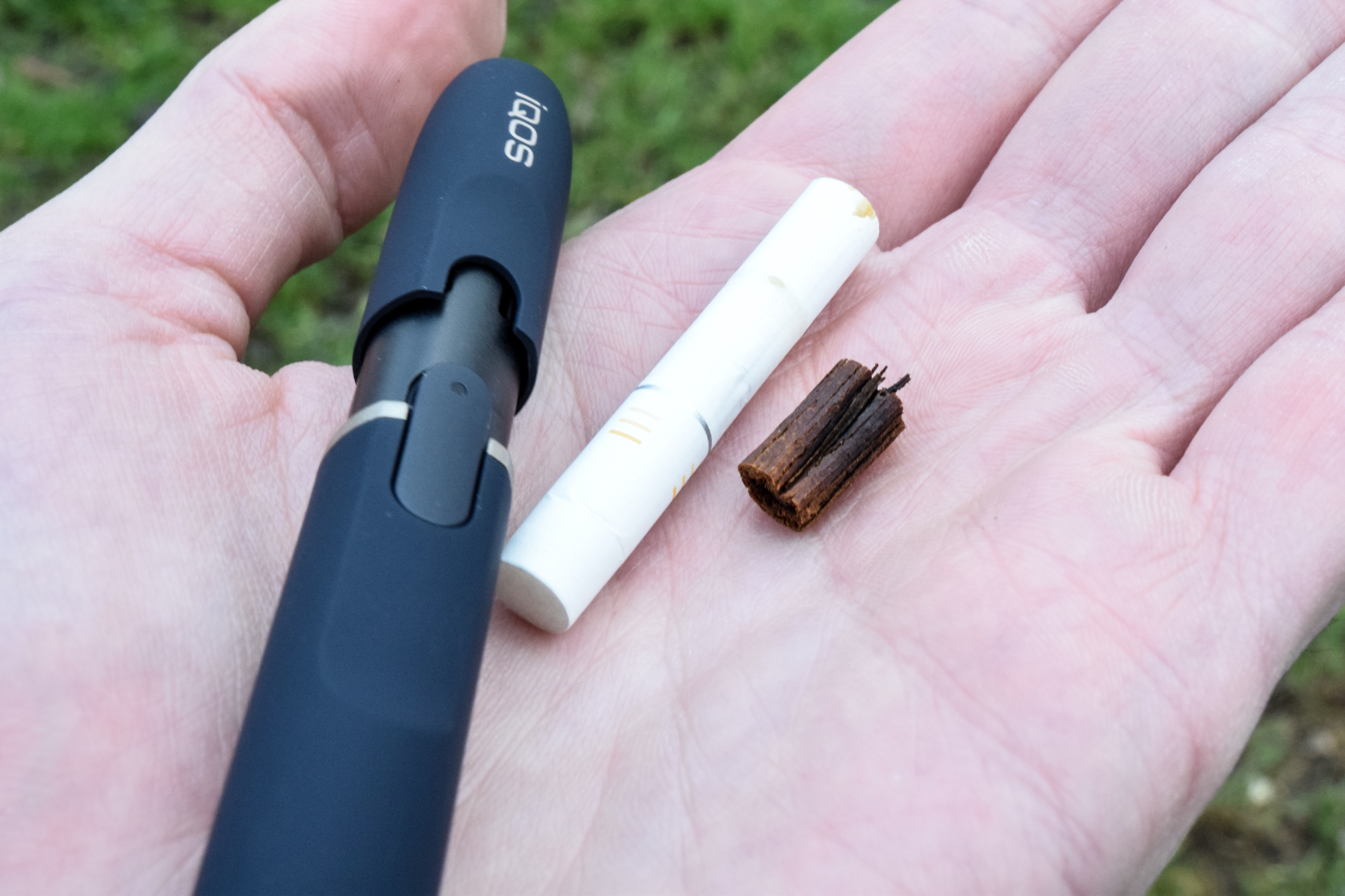
Charred tobacco after use in IQOS 2.

=== Components ===
Most Iqos models consists of a charger and a pen-like holder. A disposable stick (called "HeatStick" or "Heets") containing processed tobacco and glycerin is inserted into the holder, which then heats it to temperatures up to 350 °C (660 °F) for inhalation. Iluma, a more recent iteration, relies on induction to heat the tobacco sticks (called "Terea").

Between 2009 and 2017, more than 1,900 patents linked to Iqos have been filed by Philip Morris International. According to Fortune, the company helped make "electronic smoking devices" the second fastest growing category of new technologies in 2020.

=== Health effects ===
A 2022 Cochrane review found moderate-certainty evidence that heated tobacco users had lower exposure to toxicants or carcinogens than tobacco smokers.

In 2024, the Centers for Disease Control and Prevention stated that heated tobacco product emissions contain lower levels of harmful ingredients than cigarette smoke.

== Marketing ==
The Iqos 2.2 was the first commercially launched device under the brand name. The name has often been described by early adopters to be a backronym of "I Quit Ordinary Smoking." Philip Morris has not directly used this acronym to market their products, but has a history of deliberately playing into the idea that their products can assist with smoking cessation, while lobbying against provisions in the WHO Framework Convention on Tobacco Control.

=== Direct marketing ===
Philip Morris is regularly accused of circumventing laws prohibiting the promotion of tobacco by claiming that Iqos is not a tobacco product. Canada updated its tobacco laws to clearly include heated tobacco devices in the list of regulated tobacco products. In France, it was reported that Philip Morris was promoting its devices at private parties, with salespersons sometimes offering alcoholic beverages to interested customers.

Philip Morris has also reportedly carried out several marketing campaigns directly mentioning Iqos, presenting the product as a "smoke-free" and a "reduced-risk" alternative, encouraging consumers to quit smoking or switch to Iqos.

=== Youth-oriented marketing ===
In 2019, Reuters reported that Philip Morris was using social media influencers in several countries to make them "ambassadors" for the brand and promote Iqos to a young audience. PMI responded that it would cease use of influencers.

Also in 2020, a report on Philip Morris' Iqos implementation strategy in Australia pointed out that "Philip Morris has strongly lobbied the Australian government to legalize heated tobacco products, while simultaneously making plans to sell Iqos at young adult-friendly premises such as bars, clubs and pubs if its proposed legislative changes are made."

== Criticism and controversies ==
In December 2017, Reuters published documents and testimonies from former employees alleging irregularities in the clinical trials conducted by PMI for the approval of the Iqos product by the U.S. FDA. This investigative work reported that Philip Morris was lobbying to block or weaken the provisions made under the WHO Framework Convention on Tobacco Control (FCTC), going against the idea that the company would support a smoke-free future.

=== Patent ===
In September 2021, the U.S. International Trade Commission ruled that Philip Morris International and its commercial partner Altria must stop the sale and import of the Iqos device in the United States because of a patent case filed by R.J. Reynolds. The U.S. International Trade Commission found that the cigarette alternative infringed on two of Reynolds' patents. Philip Morris International announced its plans to appeal the trade agency's decision. The disagreement with British American Tobacco (BAT) got resolved in February 2024. PMI and BAT came to a non-monetary agreement that settled the ongoing patent infringement lawsuits between them regarding their heated tobacco and vapor products.
