= Alpes =

Alpes (French and Latin for 'Alps') may refer to:

== Places ==
- Alpes-de-Haute-Provence (formerly Basses-Alpes), a French department in the south of France
- Hautes-Alpes, a department in southeastern France
- Alpes-Maritimes, a department in the extreme southeast corner of France
- Montes Alpes, a mountain range in the northern part of the Moon's near side
- The Alps, the biggest and most extensive mount range on Europe.

== Other uses ==
- Catherine Ribeiro + Alpes, a French rock band of the 1970s

== See also ==
- Alps (disambiguation)
