= Grinds Pouches =

Caffeine pouch brand

- Type: Private
- Industry: Caffeine Pouches
- Founded: 2009; 17 years ago in San Luis Obispo, California
- Founder: Matt Canepa; Pat Pezet
- Website: https://www.getgrinds.com/

Grinds Pouches, also knowns as Grinds Coffee Pouches or simply Grinds (stylized as GR1NDS) is a brand of caffeine pouches advertised as a healthy alternative to chewing tobacco. The company was founded in 2009 by Matt Canepa and Pat Pezet, making it one of the first caffeine pouches, nearly a decade before they rose to popularity in the mid-2020s. The original Grinds pouches were made with coffee grounds, but the company has also made energy and focus pouches with natural plant fibers, similar to other caffeine pouches currently on the market. Grinds was founded in California, and they are currently headquartered in Indiana.

two unused pouches inside the catch lid of a Grinds energy pouch.

Grinds was created while Canepa and Pezet attended college at Cal Poly, having met while playing for the college's baseball team. Their business pitch for a contest held by the university awarded them with $15,000, which was used for the initial production. Due to their connections in the world of baseball, word quickly spread and the brand gained popularity with Major League Baseball players. When asked about Grinds and its connection to baseball, Canepa said “We knew a bunch of players since we’d been playing with them in college. We’d played with them in the minor leagues. Word gets around very quickly inside the locker rooms.”

Grinds Coffee Pouches were featured in Season 4 of Shark Tank, where the company managed to get a deal with sharks Daymond John and Robert Herjavec. However, said deal died in negotiations. The promotion of Grinds on Shark Tank did boost their popularity, earning $330,000 the month the episode premiered.
