= Caffeine pouch =

Pouches containing caffeine

An open packet of Mojo caffeine pouches

Caffeine pouches, also known as energy pouches, are small, rectangular sachets containing caffeine and flavoring. They can also sometimes including nootropic blends. Similar in appearance and use to nicotine pouches, they can contain anywhere from 50-225 milligrams of caffeine, and are kept in the mouth for 20-60 minutes, depending on the pouch.

== Description and use ==
Caffeine pouch packaging, one closed, one closed with catch lid open and one open.

Caffeine pouches can also include amino acids, minerals and vitamins. These pouches are similar in appearance and use to nicotine pouches and snus, but they do not contain nicotine or tobacco. Caffeine pouches can contain anywhere from 50-225 milligrams of caffeine, depending on the brand and flavor. Similarly to nicotine pouches, caffeine pouches are placed in between the user's lip and gum and left in while the taste releases. Users leave the product in their mouth for 20-40 minutes, then dispose of the pouch or keep it in a storage area built into the container to discard later.

Nootropic pouches are similar to caffeine pouches, however they are marketed as delivering nootropics to the user to help with focus, calm alertness and other health or wellness goals. Some nootropic pouches contain caffeine, but not all of them do.

== History ==
The first caffeine pouch brand to enter the market is widely recognized to be Grinds Pouches (then known as Grinds Coffee Pouches), having been established in 2009. These pouches are made with ground coffee, though the brand also has products similar to modern day caffeine pouches. Grinds uses the "coffee pouches" name for their coffee ground products to this day.

Caffeine pouches grew in popularity during the 2020s, alongside the rise of nicotine pouches such as Zyn. The pouch brand Wip sold over 2.5 million units in their first year, and Ultra nootropic pouches sold 1 million units in their first 6 months.

Due to the popularity and widespread adoption of caffeine pouches, energy drink brands such as C4 Energy, Rockstar and Bucked Up have entered the caffeine pouch market, with the former two's products releasing in 2027, and Bucked Up's product, PWR Buck, releasing in 2026. In 2025 and 2026, caffeine pouches generated controversy among parents. While these pouches are designed and marketed towards adult users, teenagers have also begun using the products. On social media sites such as TikTok, users talk about, and even promote through TikTok Shop, caffeine pouches and similar products containing melatonin. The slang terms "upper/lower deckies", "lip cushies" and "lip pillows" are used to describe the pouches.

== Usage among youth ==
While caffeine pouches are primarily targeted towards and used by adults, due to a lack of age restriction in most areas, anyone is able to purchase caffeine pouches online or in retailers that sell them. This has led to usage of caffeine pouches among teenagers. Online influencers advertise these products to kids and teens, primarily through TikTok and its dedicated Shop section. A representative for LyvWel, a caffeine pouch brand that is advertised by online influencers, stated about influencer ads targeting children "Although caffeine products are legally available to anyone who can purchase tea, coffee, or energy drinks, LyvWel was created specifically as an alternative for adult nicotine pouch users[...] We do not market to teens." As of May 2026, there are thousands of posts on social media about the pouches. Posts with slang terms "upper decky" and "lip pillow" have between 9,000-10,000 posts, while #caffeinepouch" only has 2,200 posts, in contrast.

Some teens use caffeine pouch packaging to disguise usage of nicotine pouches such as Zyn due to their similar appearance. The similarities have also caused concern among adults that they could be a gateway into usage of nicotine pouches. Richard Mumby, the CEO of caffeine pouch brand Wip, was criticized for his role as the former marketing executive for Juul, an electronic cigarette brand that was accused of advertising to underage users. In a statement to NBC News, Dr. Robert Jackler of Stanford Medicine claimed he was "...doing the same kind of viral, organic social-media marketing that he did with Juul". As a result of the caffeine pouch usage among teens and young adults, some K-12 schools across the United States have banned usage of the pouches on school grounds. Some schools have also banned caffeine pills alongside pouches, citing health concerns.

While caffeine pouches are generally not age restricted, Walgreens treats caffeine pouches as a nicotine cessation product. Due to previous controversies surrounding selling tobacco and nicotine products to minors and their nicotine cessation classification, the pouches are age restricted as if they did contain nicotine.
