= Southern Alps (disambiguation) =

The Southern Alps are a mountain range in New Zealand's South Island.

Southern Alps may also refer to:

- Southern Alps (Europe), a geographically and geologically defined region of the Alps in Europe
- Southern Limestone Alps, a geological subdivision of the European Alps
- Colloquially, the southern parts of the Alps in general
- The southern parts of various other mountain ranges called the Alps
- The Akaishi Mountains, or Southern Alps, in Japan
