= Veev =

Electronic cigarette brand

VEEV
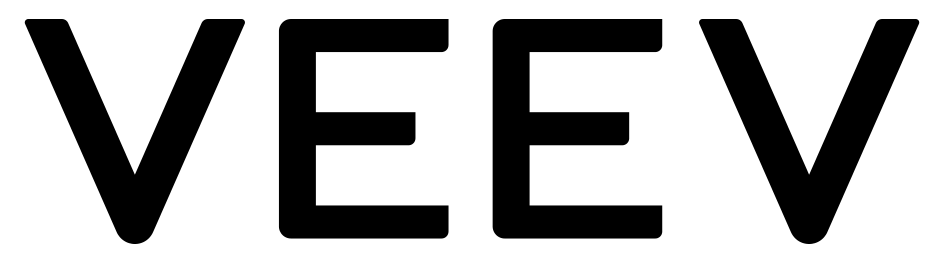

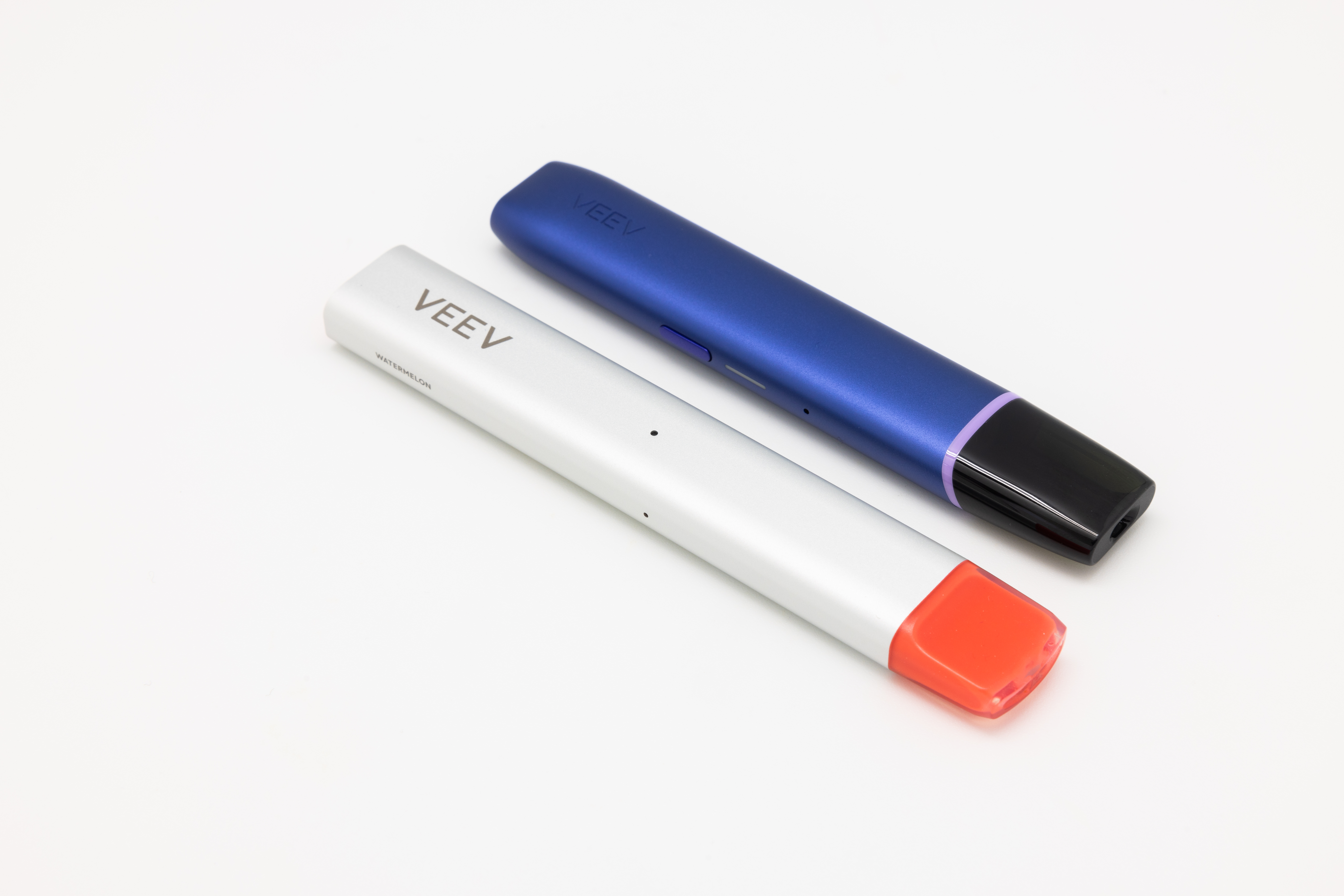
- VEEV One (top) and VEEV Now (bottom)
- Product type: Electronic cigarette
- Current owner: Philip Morris International
- Introduced: 2020
- Related brands: Iqos
- Markets: Worldwide
- Website: www.veev-vape.com

Veev (stylised as VEEV) is a brand of electronic cigarettes (e-vapor products) manufactured by Philip Morris International (PMI). The Veev originated as an element of the broader Iqos portfolio, under the name Mesh. The reworked product under the Veev brand was gradually rolled out from 2020 onwards. It currently consists of a disposable product named Veev Now and a reusable product named Veev One.

== History ==
Philip Morris International announced in November 2013 its intention to enter the electronic cigarette market by developing its own technology. It also acquired the UK's largest e-cigarette manufacturer Nicocigs in 2014, which owned the 'Nicolites' and 'Vivid' brands. These products were distributed by PMI's UK affiliate until 2019. In 2015, PMI also entered into an agreement with Altria to distribute its "MarkTen" e-cigarettes, which PMI renamed "Solaris", in Spain and Israel. Sales were discontinued in 2020.

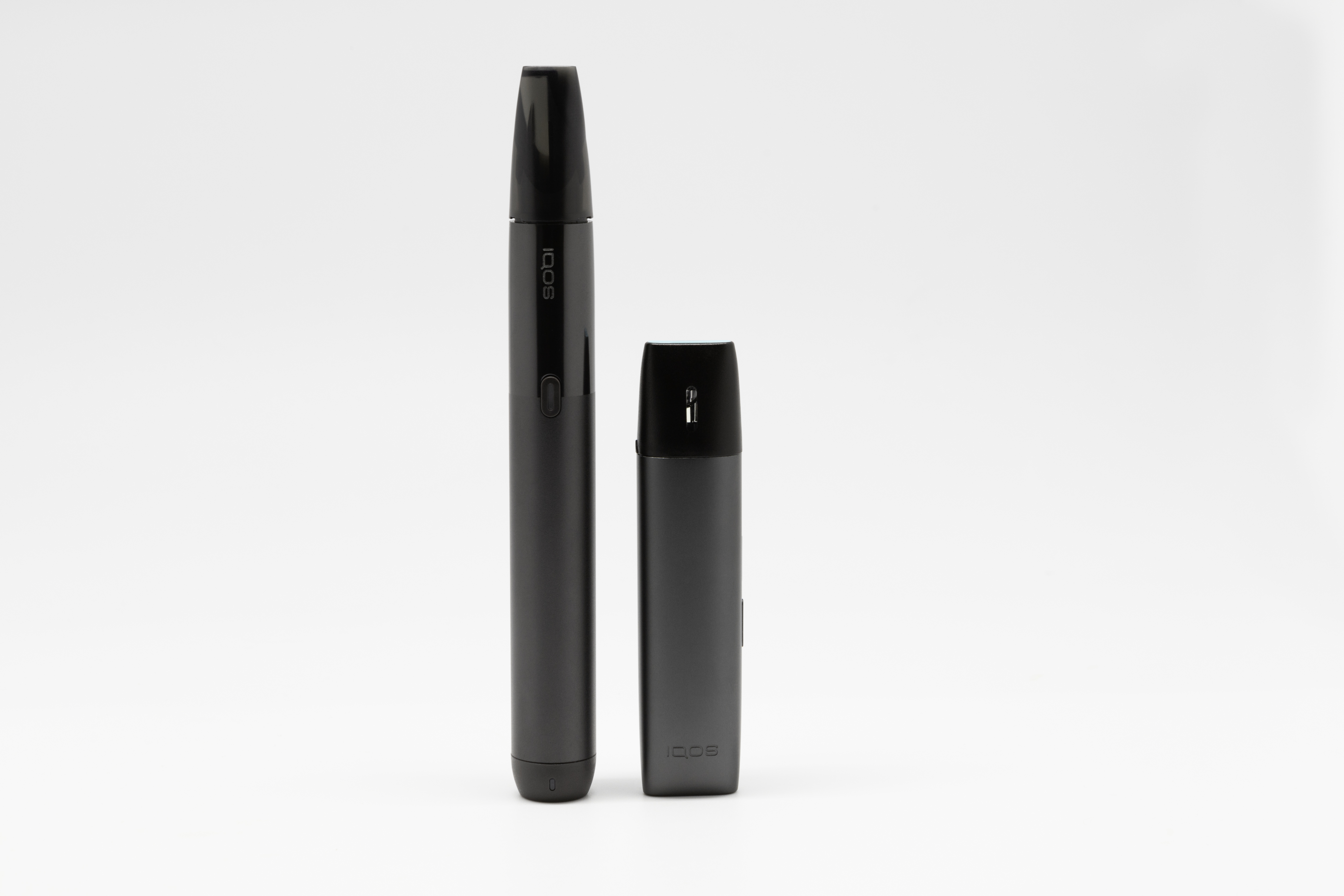
IQOS Veev (left) and IQOS Mesh (right)

In 2016, PMI launched its first internally developed e-cigarette at an event held in Neuchâtel, Switzerland, under the name IQOS Mesh, under the branding of the company's Iqos line of heated tobacco products. It launched in some British cities as part of a test phase before undergoing wider distribution nationwide in Britain from 2018. The Veev name was used for the nicotine e-liquid capsules for use with the Mesh device. In 2019, PMI CEO André Calantzopoulo announced the imminent international launch of a new generation of Philip Morris e-cigarettes. The Mesh was withdrawn from the UK market in April 2020 and PMI created the Veev brand (marketed as Iqos Veev in some countries) to replace it. The international launch of Veev was severely impacted by the COVID-19 pandemic.

Veev e-cigarettes were first available in September 2020 in New Zealand, later rolling out to 10 other countries including Italy where they had captured 20% of the local e-cigarette market by the second quarter of 2022. In 2022, PMI launched Veeba, a disposable e-cigarette, in Canada, followed by the UK. During 2023 as part of its worldwide expansion, the Veeba device was rebranded to Veev Now, while the reusable device became known as Veev One.

== Controversies ==
The portfolio of Veev products is marketed by PMI as an alternative to cigarettes to help adult smokers switch to smoke-free alternatives, along with heated tobacco (Iqos) and oral smokeless (Zyn) products in PMI's portfolio of smoke-free products. However, several authors have questioned Philip Morris International's commitment to helping smokers switch to its alternative devices: in March 2022, Professor Robert K. Jackler of Stanford University School of Medicine stated: "It seems clear that PMI's Smoke Free Future campaign is not focused upon smoking cessation, but rather legitimizing and promoting alternative nicotine delivery systems, such as its Iqos heated tobacco and their e-cigarette."

In August 2022 PMI was criticized for a program in Australia, where e-cigarettes can only be sold with prescriptions in pharmacies, proposing to pay pharmacists to share Veev-branded scripts with patients. The company confirmed that "the program never commenced".
