= Cellucor =

American sports nutrition and supplement company

- Introduced: 2002
- Markets: United States, Canada, Latin America, Australia, United Kingdom, Germany, Italy, France, Spain, Netherlands, China, Japan
- Website: cellucor.com

Cellucor is an American sports nutrition brand, specializing in dietary supplements, bodybuilding supplements, and energy drinks.

Cellucor's parent company is Nutrabolt, an independently owned private sports nutrition company headquartered in Austin, Texas.

== History ==
In 2009, Cellucor launched in GNC. In 2011, Cellucor launched its first C4 pre-workout, C4 Extreme, with "Chrome Series" premium packaging.

In 2012, Cellucor announced the release of several new supplements, including a thermogenic weight loss supplement, CLK. The brand also unveiled its COR-Performance Series, which includes ingredients like branched-chain amino acids, creatine, and protein.

In 2013, Cellucor had several product launches, including the re-launch of its mass building supplement M5 Extreme, called M5 Reloaded, and the anabolic supplement P6 Black, a re-formulation.

In late 2014, Cellucor launched the fourth-generation "G4 Series" with updated formulas of pre-workouts, amino acids, nitric oxide boosters, ready-to-drink beverages, testosterone boosters, and weight loss supplements. The product list included C4 Original, Alpha Amino, NO3, P6, and SuperHD. The brand also launched C4 Mass, C4 Ripped, C4 50x, and C4 RTD.

In subsequent years, the C4 line expanded into Costco, Target, and Walmart, with NSF certified products.

In 2016, Cellucor launched C4 Ultimate, part of a lineup called the C4 iD Series. The company launched its first carbonated pre-workout energy drink in 2018, called C4 On The Go Carbonated.

In 2021, Cellucor partnered with Mars Incorporated to bring flavors based on Starburst and Skittles to the C4 line.

In March 2022, C4 became the official energy drink of SXSW.

In April 2024, C4 became the first official energy drink partner of WWE in a multi-year partnership.

On October 2026, C4 announced a line of caffeine pouches, to be released the following year.

== Awards ==
- 2010 – "Best New Brand" by Bodybuilding.com
- 2011 – "Vendor of the Year" by GNC, repeated in 2013, 2014, and 2015
- 2012 – "Outstanding Partnership" and "Best Product Innovation" (SuperHD) by GNC
- 2012 – "Fat Loss Supplement of the Year" (SuperHD) by Bodybuilding.com
- 2013 – "Vendor of the Year" and "Best Product Innovation" (P6 Black) by GNC
- 2013 – "Best New Product of the Year" (COR-Performance Whey), "Pre Workout of the Year" (C4 Extreme), "Fat Loss Supplement of the Year" (SuperHD) by Bodybuilding.com
- 2014 – "Pre Workout of the Year" (C4 Extreme) by Bodybuilding.com
- 2015 – "New Product of the Year" (C4 Ripped) by Bodybuilding.com
