= Haypp =

E-commerce platform for nicotine products

- Formerly: Snusbolaget
- Type: Public
- Traded as: Nasdaq Stockholm: HAYPP
- Industry: E-commerce; Retail of nicotine products
- Founded: 2009; 17 years ago
- Founders: Henrik Nordström; Linus Liljegren
- Headquarters: Stockholm, Sweden
- Area served: Sweden, Norway, Denmark, United Kingdom, Germany
- Key people: Gavin O'Dowd (CEO)
- Revenue: SEK 3.849 billion (2025)
- Operating income: SEK 58.4 million (2025)
- Net income: SEK 42.5 million (2025)
- Total assets: SEK 1.263 billion (2025)
- Total equity: SEK 669.9 million (2025)
- Website: www.haypp.com/uk

Haypp is an international e-commerce platform for online sale of tobacco-free nicotine pouches and other smokeless nicotine products. Operated by Haypp Group AB, the website serves customers in the United Kingdom, Germany, and Sweden. It is listed on the Nasdaq First North under the ticker HAYPP.

== History ==
Haypp Group was founded in 2009 by Henrik Nordström and Linus Liljegren in Stockholm under the name Snusbolaget to sell Swedish snus online. In 2019 the company merged with the Norwegian online retailer Northerner to form the international Haypp Group, a transaction covered by Norwegian business daily E24.

Haypp was listed on the Nasdaq Stockholm on 13 October 2021, at an initial market capitalisation of about SEK 1.92 billion. In August 2024, Norwegian hotel entrepreneur Petter Stordalen acquired a stake in Haypp Group.

In January 2024, the platform VapeGlobe.de was launched and a dedicated logistics centre was opened in Germany. In March 2026, the group announced its withdrawal from the British e-cigarette market. Haypp.com operates a direct-to-consumer online retail model and maintains fulfilment centres in Haninge, Sweden, and Milton Keynes, United Kingdom. Product listings are reviewed through a quality-assurance programme called Nicoleaks. The company recorded continuous growth in net revenue from SEK 460 million in 2018 to SEK 3,849 million (approximately €340 million) in fiscal year 2025.
