= ALP (automobile) =

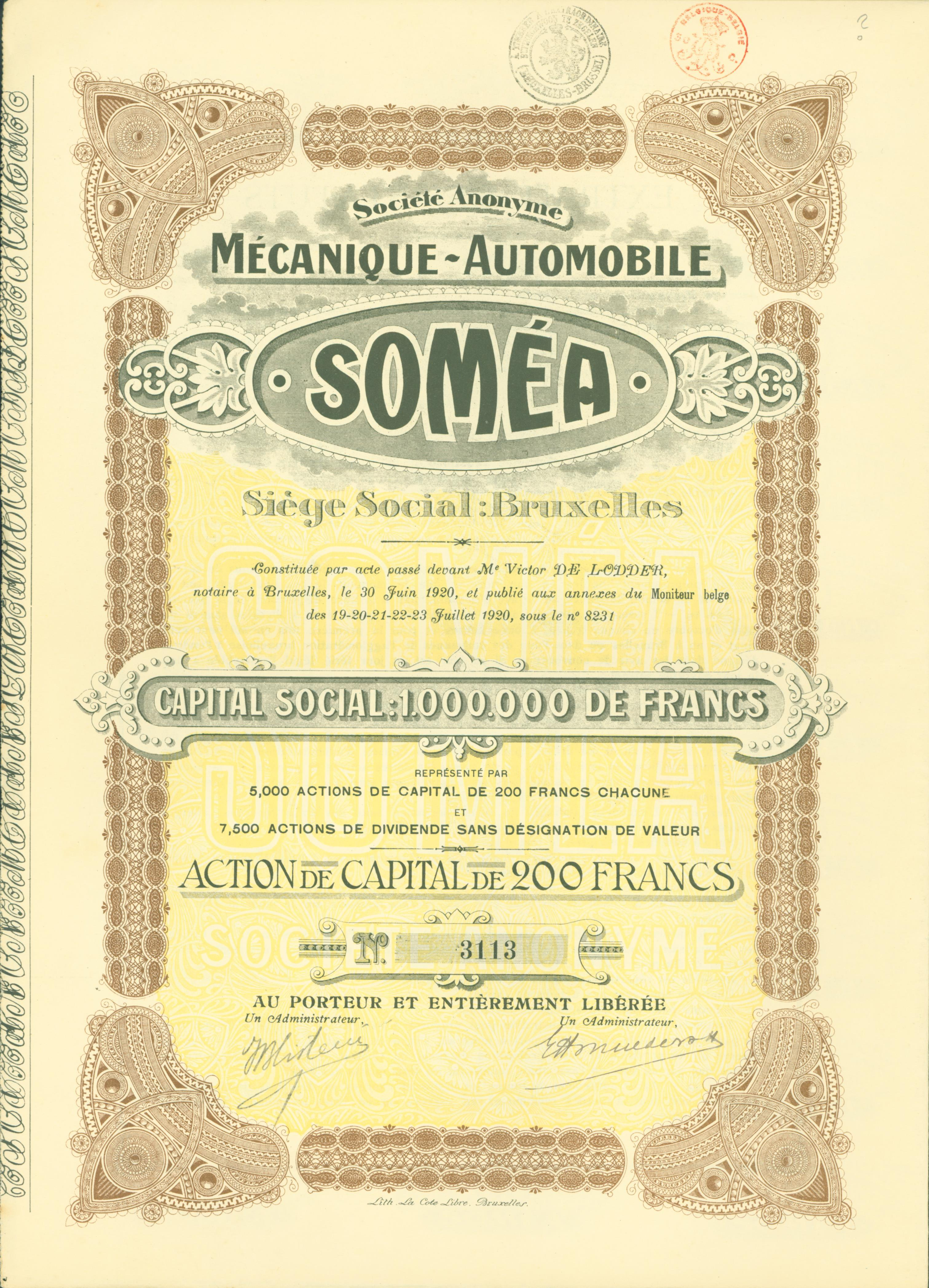

The Automobiles Leroux-Pisart (ALP) was a Belgian automobile built in 1920 in Brussels.

== History ==
André Leroux and André Pisart founded the company in 1919. The company's headquarters were on Boulevard de Waterloo in Brussels . In the same year, the production of automobiles, designed by Leroux, began. The brand name was ALP.

From July 1920, the company name was changed to SA Mécanique-Automobile Soméa. It is unclear whether this was a name change or a new owner. Baron Pierre de Caters was president, Germanès, Mulders, Leroux and Pisart were involved. A new factory was built in Vilvoorde. In 1921, Leroux left the company. Paul Bastien was hired as the new designer. The new brand name Soméa was introduced in December 1921 at the latest. Production ended in December 1923 and the company was dissolved.

== Autmobiles ==
=== ALP ===
The 10 CV model was equipped with a four-cylinder engine with a displacement of 1847 cc . There was also a model with a displacement of 2121 cc. The engines came from Decologne and Ballot, the chassis from the Société Métallurgique Dyle et Bacalan. It was a light car designed by André Leroux, a former Metallurgical engineer.

=== SOMEA ===
This model was presented at the Brussels Motor Show in 1921. The vehicle had a four-cylinder engine with 2018 cc displacement and OHC valve control . Only a few examples were produced.

== Literature ==
- Yvette Kupélian, Jacques Kupélian, Jacques Sirtaine: . FSA, Brussels 2012, ISBN 978-2-87212-662-0, p. 291 (French).
- George Nicholas Georgano : Cars. Encyclopedia complete. 1885 today. Courtille, Paris 1975 (French).
- George Nicholas Georgano : . EP Dutton, New York 1982, ISBN 0-525-93254-2 (English). <-- Motorcars -->
- David Burgess Wise: . Greenwich Editions, London 2004, ISBN 0-86288-258-3 (English).
- Harald H. Linz, Halwart Schrader : . United Soft Media Verlag, Munich 2008, ISBN 978-3-8032-9876-8 .
- Yvette Kupélian, Jacques Kupélian, Jacques Sirtaine: History of the Belgian automobile. Paul Legrain, Brussels, ISBN 2-8705-7001-5 and epa, Paris, ISBN 2-8512-0090-9 (French).
