= Alps (disambiguation) =

The Alps are a major European mountain range.

Alps may also refer to:

== Places ==
=== Europe ===
==== Subdivisions of the Alps proper ====
- Bavarian Alps, in Germany
- Eastern Alps, in Austria, Switzerland, Germany, Italy, Slovenia and Liechtenstein
- Julian Alps, in Italy and Slovenia
- Northern Limestone Alps, in Austria and Germany
- Southern Limestone Alps, in Italy, Austria and Slovenia
- Southern Alps (Europe), in Italy, Austria and Slovenia
- Western Alps, in France, Italy, Switzerland and Monaco

==== Other European mountain ranges ====
- Apuan Alps, in Italy
- Arrochar Alps, in Scotland
- Dinaric Alps, in Slovenia, Croatia, Bosnia and Herzegovina, Serbia, Montenegro, and Albania
- Lyngen Alps, in mostly Norway
- Sunnmørsalpane, in Norway
- Transylvanian Alps, mostly in Romania

=== The Americas ===
==== United States ====
- Alps, Georgia, in the State of Georgia
- Bohemian Alps, in Nebraska
- Issaquah Alps, in the State of Washington
- Trinity Alps, in California

==== Greenland ====
- Nansen-Jensen Alps, North Greenland
- Norlund Alps, in Hudson Land, NE Greenland
- Princess Caroline-Mathilde Alps, in Holm Land, NE Greenland
- Princess Elizabeth Alps, in Crown Prince Christian Land, NE Greenland
- Schweizerland Alps, in King Christian IX Land, SE Greenland
- Stauning Alps, in Scoresby Land, Greenland

=== Asia ===
- Japanese Alps, in Japan
- Pontic Alps, in Turkey
- Yeongnam Alps, in South Korea

=== Other continents and islands ===
- Australian Alps, in Australia in New South Wales, Victoria, and the ACT
- Southern Alps (New Zealand), on the South Island of New Zealand

=== Solar System ===
- Montes Alpes, on the Moon

== Other uses ==
- Alps (supercomputer), a supercomputer in Lugano, Switzerland
- Alps (film), a 2011 Greek drama
- Alps Electric, a multinational corporation based in Japan
- The Alps (film), a 2007 American documentary film
- The Alps (band), an English band
- Autoimmune lymphoproliferative syndrome, a form of lymphoproliferative disorder

== See also ==
- ALPS (disambiguation)
- Alpes (disambiguation)
- Alp (disambiguation)
- ALP (disambiguation)
- Alpine (disambiguation)
