= Jed Rose =

American businessman

- Education: Stanford University; Cambridge University
- Occupations: Businessman, entrepreneur

Jed Rose is a British-based American businessman and entrepreneur.

== Education ==
Rose received an MBA from Cambridge University and a BSc with Honors in Symbolic Systems from Stanford University.

== Career ==
After graduating Stanford, Rose worked in product management at Microsoft, where he was responsible for consumer marketing on Microsoft Windows and also led in the creation of Microsoft's $3 Student Innovation Suite for students in developing countries. During his time there, he also brought to market a new technology called Windows Multipoint Mouse, which allowed for improved shared access computing for classrooms and had widespread success in Southeast Asia.

After working on several entrepreneurial ventures, he served as CEO and Managing Director for Paymentsense, a merchant services payment provider. He then worked about two years as the General Manager of EMEA for Airwallex, an international payments company for businesses. Rose is currently a Partner at Antler, which is an early-stage venture capital firm, and doing investments from the UK fund. The fund has done over 100 investments since 2019. While Rose has been running the fund, Antler was named the "VC Firm of the Year" by the Growth Investor Awards in 2022.

== Improvisational Theatre ==
Rose started doing improv in a class at Stanford. While at Microsoft, Rose worked with Unexpected Productions and was an ensemble member of Quiet Monkey Fight. In addition to several years of performing and teaching improvisational theatre in Seattle, Rose developed an interest in applied improvisation and its potential for impact with businesses. Rose co-authored a paper for the International Journal of Management Reviews. He is an alumnus of Cambridge University's largest and oldest student-run improv troupe, the Cambridge Impronauts.
