= Zyn =

Nicotine pouch brand

ZYN
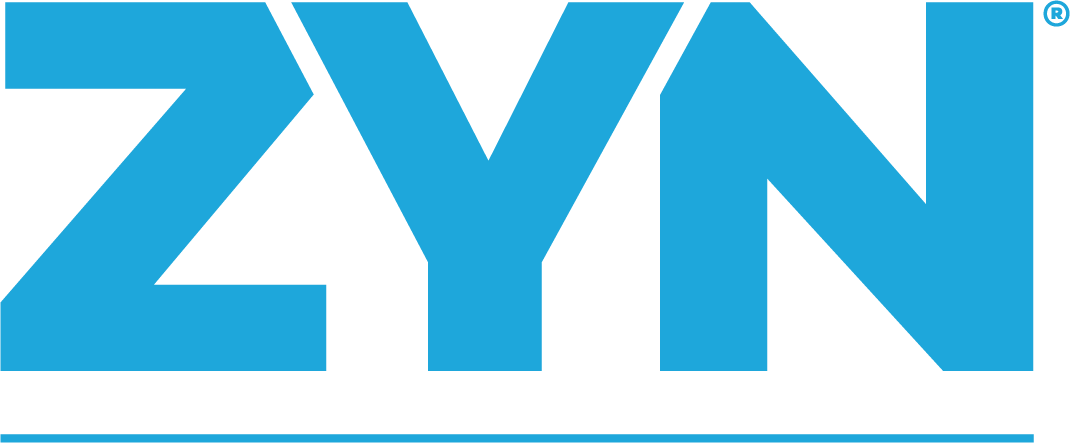

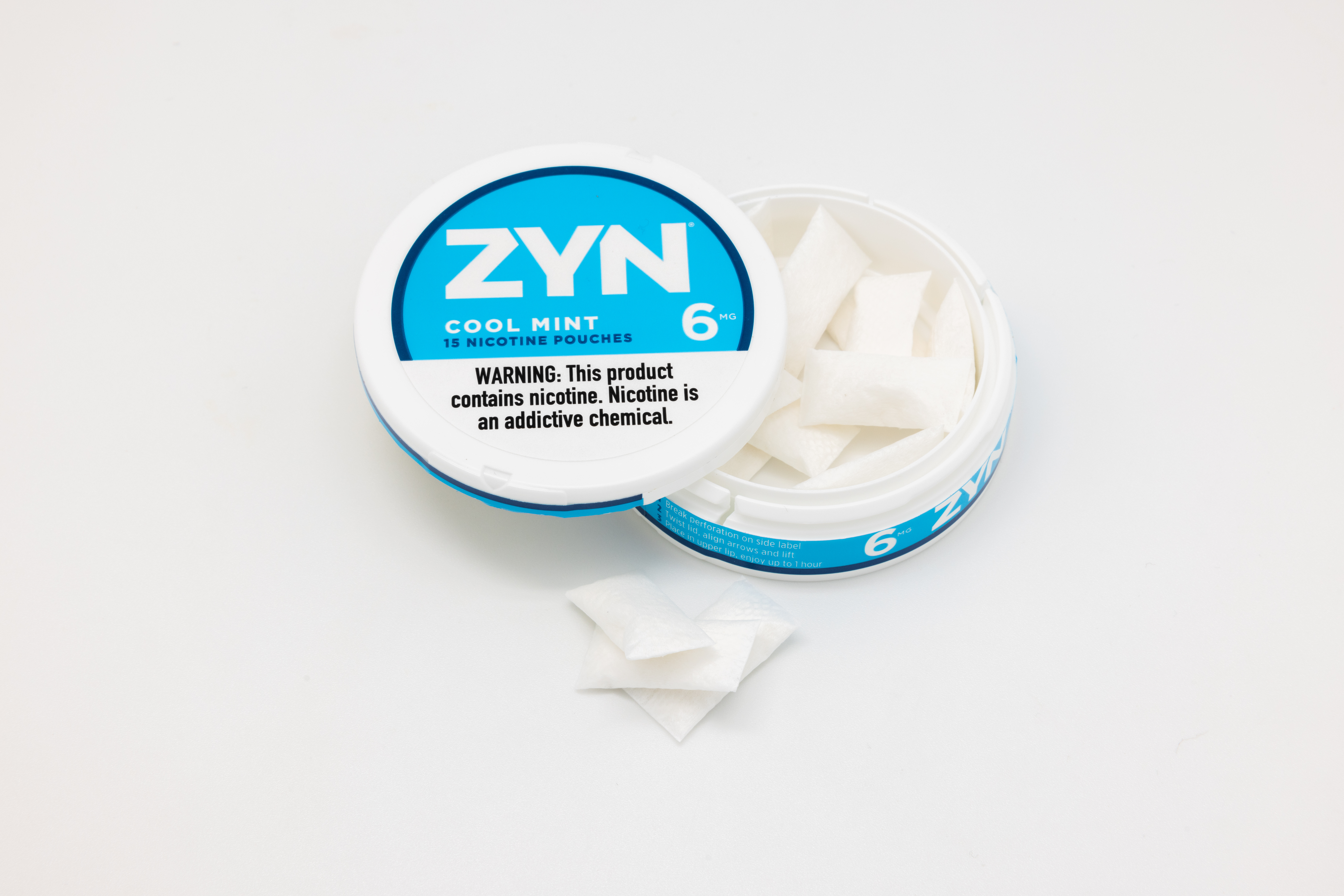
- Product type: Nicotine pouches
- Current owner: Swedish Match
- Introduced: 2016 (10 years ago)
- Markets: 55 (2025)
- Tagline: Find your ZYN
- Website: zyn.com

Zyn (stylized as "ZYN") is a Swedish brand of nicotine pouches. Zyn pouches are designed to be placed between the gums and lip, allowing nicotine to be absorbed into the bloodstream through oral soft tissue. Unlike snus or dip, nicotine pouches do not contain tobacco or stem material, but remain addictive due to their nicotine content.

The brand was created by Swedish Match, a subsidiary of Philip Morris International since 2022. In the United States, Zyn’s share of the nicotine-pouch category exceeded 70% in 2023. By 2025 that number had decreased to 60%.

== History ==
Zyn pouches were initially launched on a small scale in the US market, first being marketed in Colorado, and then in various western US states during 2016. Zyn pouches also began to be marketed in Sweden in 2016. From 2017 to 2019 one of Swedish Match's US plants, located in Owensboro, Kentucky, was expanded to handle the manufacturing of Zyn pouches directly in the US. The works required an investment of $115 million and the new plant opened in May 2019. By the end of 2018, Zyn pouches were available in about 13,500 stores in the United States and by the end of 2020, they were available in about 100,000 US stores.

In November 2022, Swedish Match was acquired by Philip Morris International. Zyn has been identified among the strategic brands acquired by the tobacco giant to achieve its vision of a "smoke-free future", alongside the company's existing portfolio of Iqos heated tobacco and Veev vaping products.

Previously, Philip Morris already had nicotine pouches in its product range through the Shiro brand, acquired by PMI in May 2021 with the purchase of the Danish company AG Snus. Zyn pouches have experienced rapid growth in popularity among American consumers, especially from 2023 onwards.

== Design ==
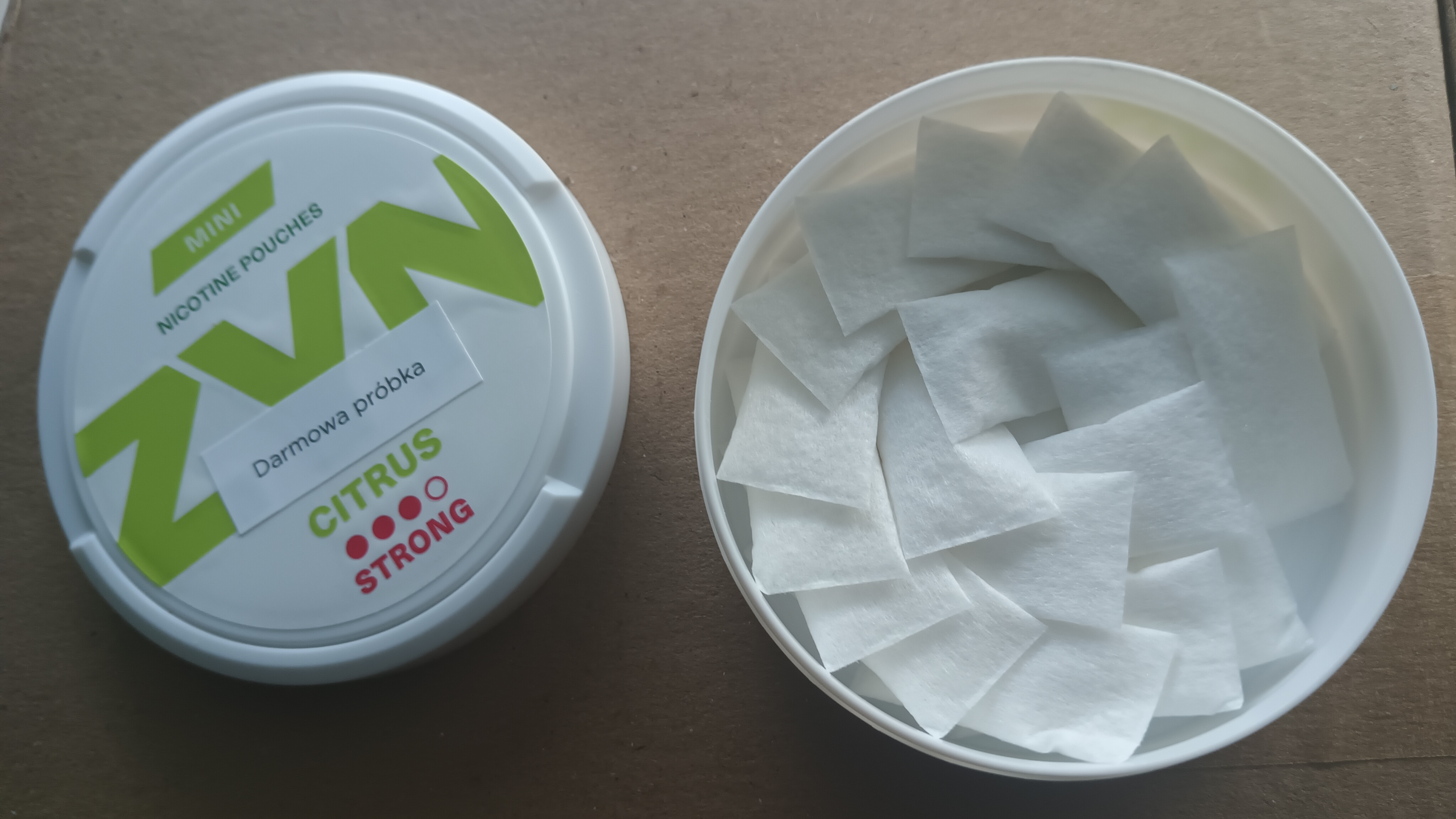
Polish distribution

Zyn pouches are sold in round cans containing 15 or 20 pouches depending on the market. Pouches are available in different levels of nicotine strength (such as 3, 6, 9 or 11 milligrams per pouch in the US) and different flavored and unflavored varieties.

The pouches contain nicotine extracted from tobacco leaves, and food grade ingredients. The pouches themselves are made of plant fibers, which allow the nicotine to diffuse out of the pouch when moistened. They are designed to be placed between the user's upper lip and gum, or between the gum and cheek, and used for up to one hour.

== Sales ==
According to Swedish Match, sales of Zyn in the US totaled 12.7 million cans in 2018 and 50.4 million in 2019. The company said in its annual report that 2018 was the first year it became profitable in the US in the snus and nicotine pouches segment. Sales of Zyn pouches have then grown rapidly and have contributed to a significant increase in Swedish Match's revenues from 2020 onwards. The company sold nearly 130 million nicotine pouch cans in the US in 2020 and nearly 198 million in 2021. According to Philip Morris International, 384.8 million Zyn cans were sold worldwide in 2023, up 62% from 237 million cans in 2022. This rapid increase in demand contributed to a shortage in May 2024, with Philip Morris International stating that it was experiencing supply chain tensions. To increase its capacity, the company announced plans to build a new manufacturing facility in Colorado, which is set to start production in 2026.

Between 2019 and 2022, Swedish Match had a market share of around 60% in nicotine pouches in the US with the Zyn brand. In 2023, the brand's market share had grown to 76%.

== Criticism ==
In 2021, Swedish Match was criticized in the UK for its Zyn marketing on social media, including presenting its nicotine pouches as a supplement to regular smoking in places where smoking is banned, with the slogan "Can't smoke? Can't vape? Can Zyn". In 2024, further criticism emerged regarding Zyn's rewards program. The program, which allows users to accumulate points for purchases and redeem them for prizes, was characterized by The Guardian author Alaina Demopoulos as incentivizing nicotine use, with the article headline stating "Use nicotine, win an iPad!"

== See also ==
- Nicotine lozenges
- Nicotine replacement therapy
