= ALPS =

ALPS may refer to:

- A Language for Process Specification
- Airport Logistics Park Singapore
- Alps Electric, a multinational corporation based in Japan
- Automated Language Processing Systems, a company in Salt Lake City, credited with developing the first commercial assisted-translation software
- Autoimmune lymphoproliferative syndrome
- Advanced Liquid Processing System developed by Toshiba for treating Fukushima contaminated water with a multi-nuclide removal equipment
- Application-Level Profile Semantics (ALPS) data format
- Amphipathic lipid packing sensor motifs, a protein motif that senses membrane curvature

== See also ==
- Alps (disambiguation)
