= Nicotine pouch =

Nicotine product

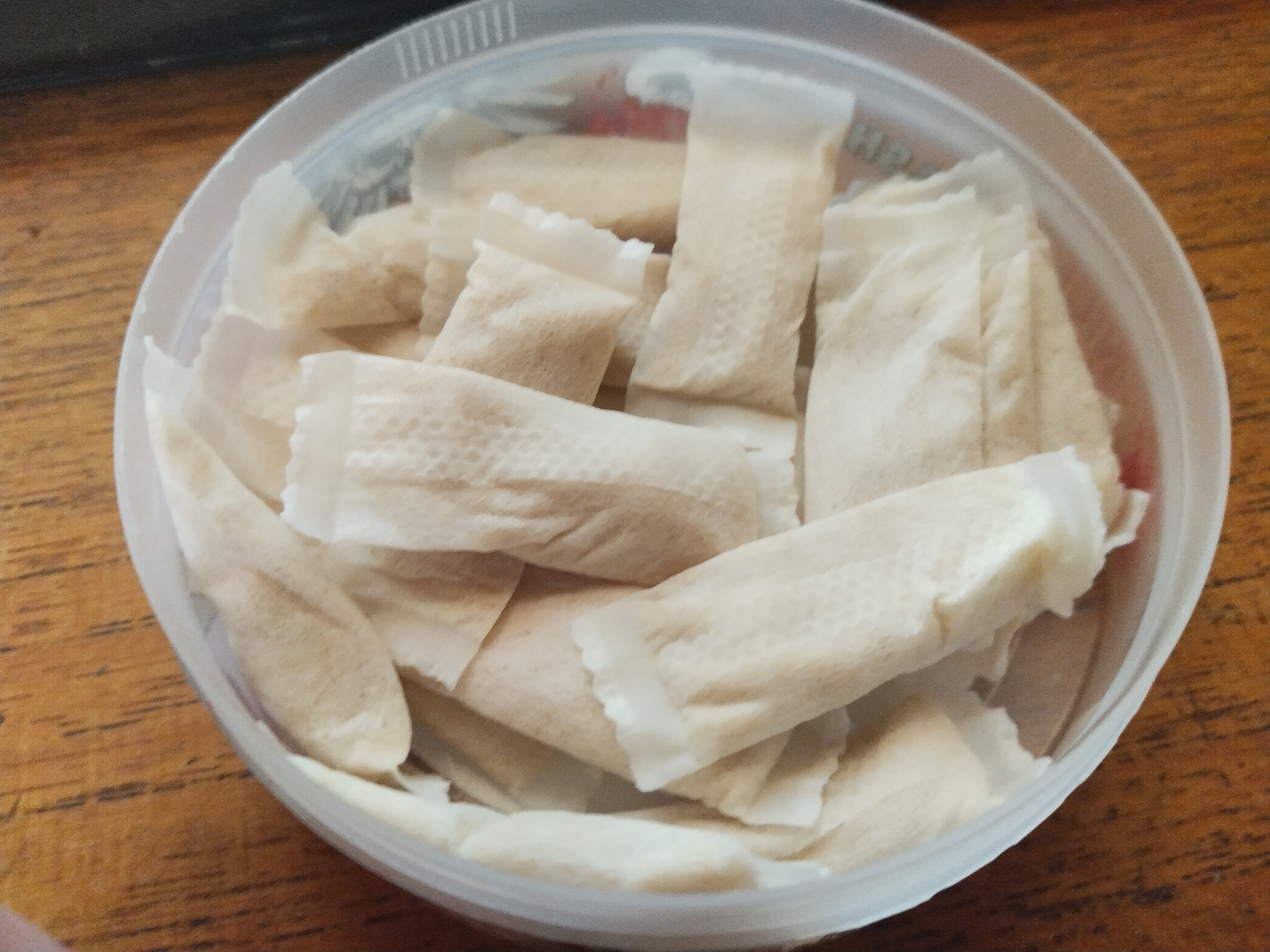
A box of nicotine pouches

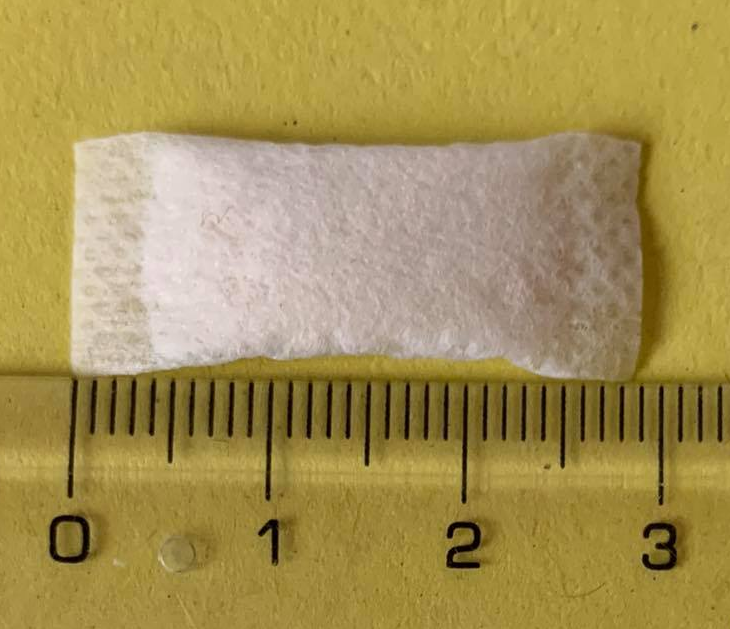
A single 3 cm nicotine pouch

Nicotine pouches are small, rectangular pouches containing nicotine, flavorings and other ingredients. Unlike snus, they do not include tobacco leaf, dust, or stem. The nicotine may either be derived from tobacco plants or may be synthetic.

Like with snus or dipping tobacco the user puts a pouch between their lip and gum, and leaves it there while the nicotine and taste is being released. The nicotine enters the bloodstream via mucous membranes in the gums. When finished, the pouch is disposed of. The small pouches differ from chewing tobacco in that the user does not need to spit, since the contents of the pouches stay inside the pouches during use.

There is limited independent testing of the constituents, exposure, or biomarkers of effects for nicotine pouches, although independent research is now emerging. Global sales of nicotine pouches expanded rapidly between 2018 and 2023, increasing from an estimated 292 million units to 20.1 billion units, with approximately 85 percent of purchases occurring in the United States, and one brand, Zyn, accounting for more than 70 percent of the global market share. Since 2021, sales of nicotine pouches have grown with Zyn as the global leader. This popularity has led to controversy among government regulators who view the product's appeal to youth as concerning. Caffeine pouches, a similar product containing caffeine rather than nicotine, has also garnered controversy for their appeal to youth, both due to health concerns and for concerns they could be seen as a gateway to nicotine pouches.

== Usage ==
While relatively new, nicotine pouches share similarities with Swedish snus. The first pouch product was developed in the beginning of the 2000s by a small start up company Niconovum. This company registered the product in 2008 as a medicinal nicotine replacement product (Zonnic) with 2 mg of nicotine.

In 2009, RJ Reynolds (now British American Tobacco) bought Niconovum. Thereafter tobacco companies, particularly Swedish Match, became active in the pouch category. Many of Sweden's leading snus manufacturers, such as Swedish Match, Skruf and AG Snus created their nicotine pouch brands as a direct response to demand for a nicotine option with less conspicuous, smokeless usage. While discreet and tobacco-free, nicotine pouches can still, potentially, cause some side effects like: hiccups, gum irritation, nausea and headaches.

It is unclear whether smokers might switch to nicotine pouches or if they would continue to smoke and use nicotine pouches, resulting in dual use. Retail prices for nicotine pouches vary across countries and sales channels. In the United States, convenience store data from 2018 to 2022 indicate that inflation-adjusted prices for modern oral nicotine products, including nicotine pouches, ranged from approximately US$4.22 to $4.57, compared to about $5.73 to $8.55 per pack of cigarettes over the same period.

Recent analyses of the U.S. retail market indicate that oral nicotine pouches are often priced lower than cigarettes, in part because many states do not tax them in the same way as other tobacco products, a factor that may contribute to their uptake among price-sensitive users. Unlike vaping products, they require no batteries and no accessory device.

Nicotine pouches may entice youth as well as young adult never-smokers because they are available in an array of flavors and may be used unobtrusively.

In pharmacies in Norway, Finland, Denmark, and Sweden, nicotine pouches are also sold as a delivery mechanism for nicotine replacement therapy. In Norway, the brand Zonnic is approved by the Norwegian Medicines Agency for smoking cessation. In Canada, 4 mg nicotine pouches became available for sale in gas stations and convenience stores in 2023 as a form of nicotine replacement therapy under the brand Zonnic.

== Contents ==
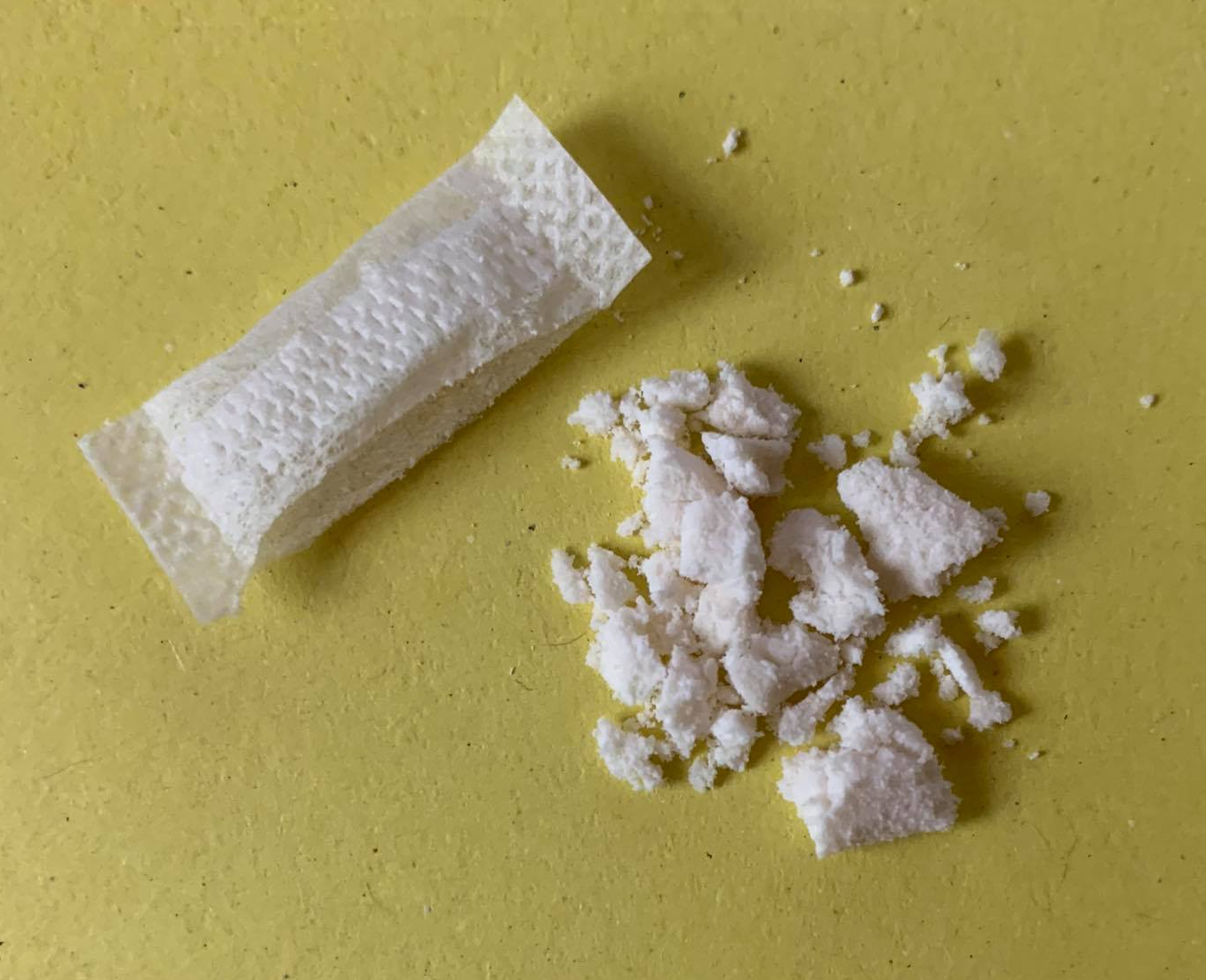
The contents of a nicotine pouch are mostly plant fiber

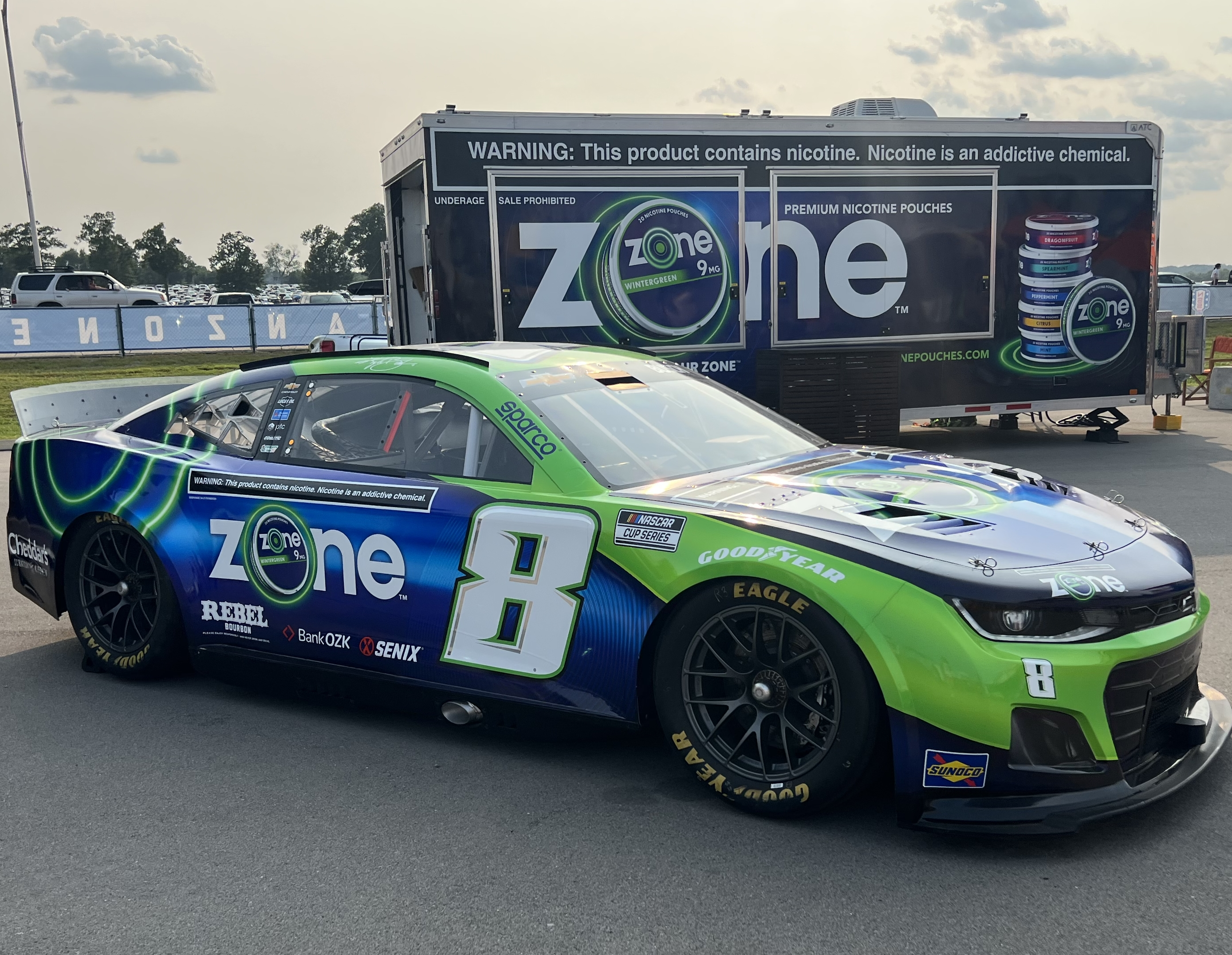
Nicotine pouches advertisement on Kyle Busch's NASCAR Cup Series show car, Nashville Superspeedway, 2025.

In addition to nicotine (sometimes as nicotine salts), pouches typically contain food-grade fillers, sweeteners, and flavorings. The main ingredient in nicotine pouches in terms of volume is plant fiber. Plant fibers are used to fill the pouch and give it the desired shape, fit, and properties. Different brands use different fibers, but some of the most common derive from eucalyptus and pine.

Nicotine pouches are sold in a wide array of flavors, such as peppermint, black cherry, coffee or citrus. The nicotine content among nicotine pouch brands typically varies from 1 milligram/pouch to 10 mg/pouch although some have much more (up to 50 mg/pouch). Nicotine pouches usually have a longer shelf-life than traditional snus.

== Health risks ==
Nicotine pouches contain the addictive chemical nicotine. Major public health authorities in the United States emphasise that these products should not be used by youth, young adults, or pregnant women who are classed as vulnerable to the effects of nicotine exposure.

Recent scoping and scientific reviews conclude that nicotine pouches expose users to substantially fewer tobacco-related toxicants than combustible cigarettes and generally fewer than traditional smokeless tobacco products. However, there is limited independent testing of the constituents, exposure, or biomarkers of effects for nicotine pouches, with many studies funded or conducted by industry, and long-term effects on oral, cardiovascular and overall health remain uncertain. These reviews also highlight concerns about dual usage with other nicotine products, and the need for longer-term independent research to assess their broader public health impact.

Nicotine itself is currently classified as non-carcinogenic according to the International Agency for Research on Cancer, and according to the Royal College of Physicians, nicotine in itself is not a hazardous drug. In turn, it is hypothesized that if nicotine can be delivered without tobacco and smoke inhalation, most, if not all of the harm of smoking can be avoided. However, if not carcinogenic, nicotine is still moderately harmful to cardiovascular health, therefore long-term use of non-tobacco nicotine pouches very likely causes higher risks for cardiovascular diseases, stroke, and reproductive harms.

Several recent clinical studies and reviews have further evaluated the health effects and nicotine delivery profile of nicotine pouches. A 2025 study from Japan Tobacco International showed that nicotine uptake from pouches increased proportionally with dose, showing plasma nicotine levels comparable to Swedish snus and faster than nicotine gum. No major safety concerns were observed after single use.

An independent 2024 clinical trial evaluating high-nicotine pouches found that 30-mg pouches delivered plasma nicotine levels twice as high as cigarettes. These pouches caused significant increases in heart rate and arterial stiffness, raising concerns about cardiovascular effects and addiction potential. The authors recommended setting upper limits on nicotine content.

Additionally, a 2024 scoping review summarized existing research and noted that nicotine pouches likely pose fewer toxicant exposures compared to cigarettes, but highlighted concerns regarding youth uptake and the lack of long-term independent studies assessing public health impact.

Advocacy groups opposed to the introduction of nicotine pouches in Kenya have protested that they may raise the risk of cancer, heart disease, and reproductive or developmental harms. The Kenya Tobacco Control Alliance alleged that given the higher levels of some toxic chemicals, and what the US Food and Drug Administration said was a lack of medical data showing the pouches are safer than cigarettes (as claimed by manufacturer British American Tobacco), the government should not license the product.

Major health and cancer organisations in the United States, including MD Anderson Cancer Center, the Cleveland Clinic and the American Cancer Society recognise that nicotine pouches generally expose users to fewer toxic substances than combustible cigarettes because they contain no tobacco leaf and involve no combustion.

As leading scientific bodies such as the Royal College of Physicians and National Academies of Sciences have emphasized, it is the products of burning tobacco, not nicotine itself, that cause the majority of cardiovascular disease and respiratory illness.

=== Accidental ingestion in children ===
Reports of accidental ingestion of nicotine pouches by young children have increased in recent years. A 2025 analysis of U.S. poison-control center data found that reported pouch ingestions among children under six rose by approximately 763 percent between 2020 and 2023, with most cases involving toddlers under the age of three, highlighting the importance of safe storage practices in households where nicotine products are present. In 2025 with accidental ingestions still on the rise, the FDA issued a press release urging nicotine pouch manufacturers to use child-resistant packaging.

== Classification ==
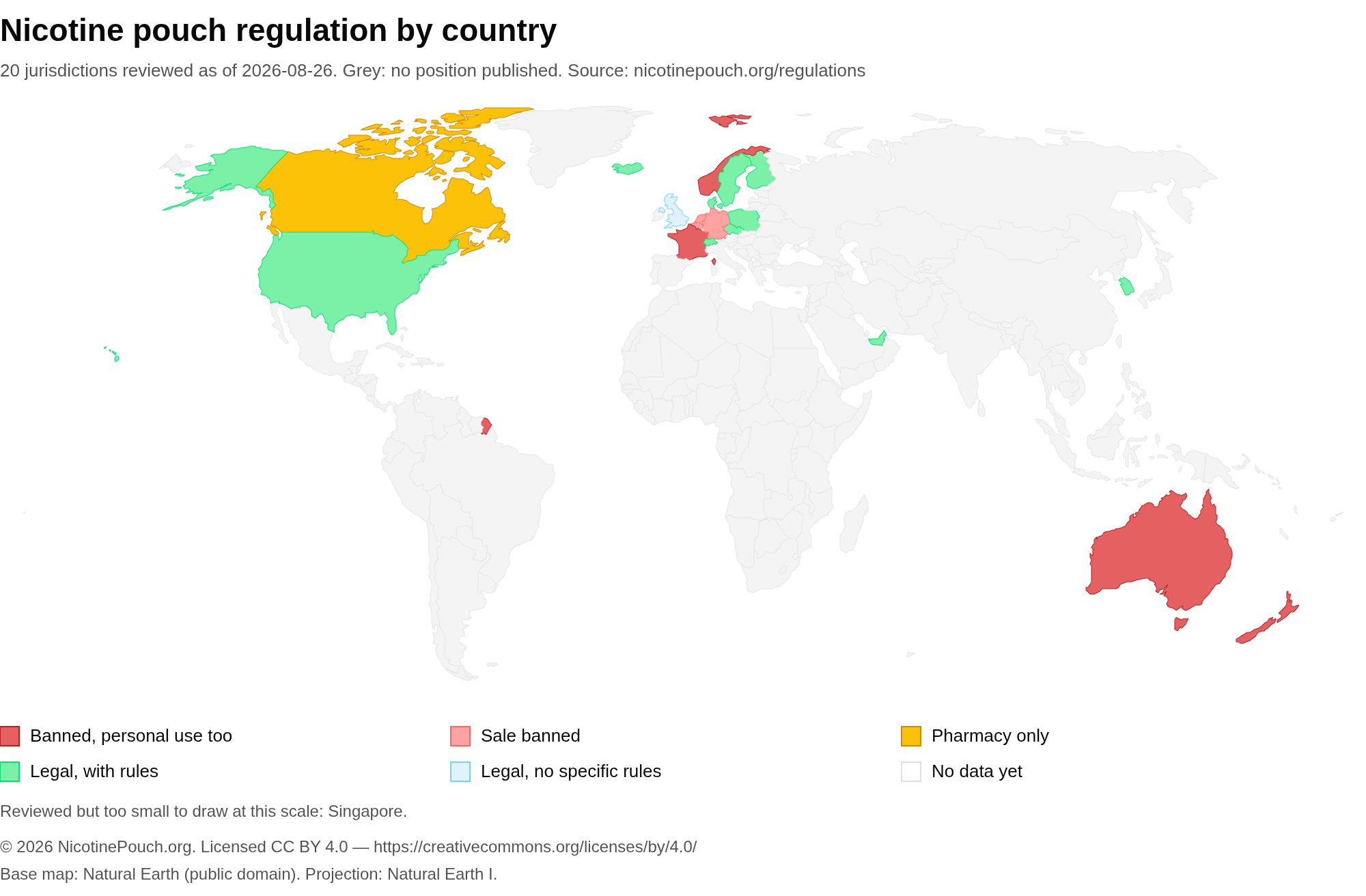
Global Nicotine Pouch Regulation by Country

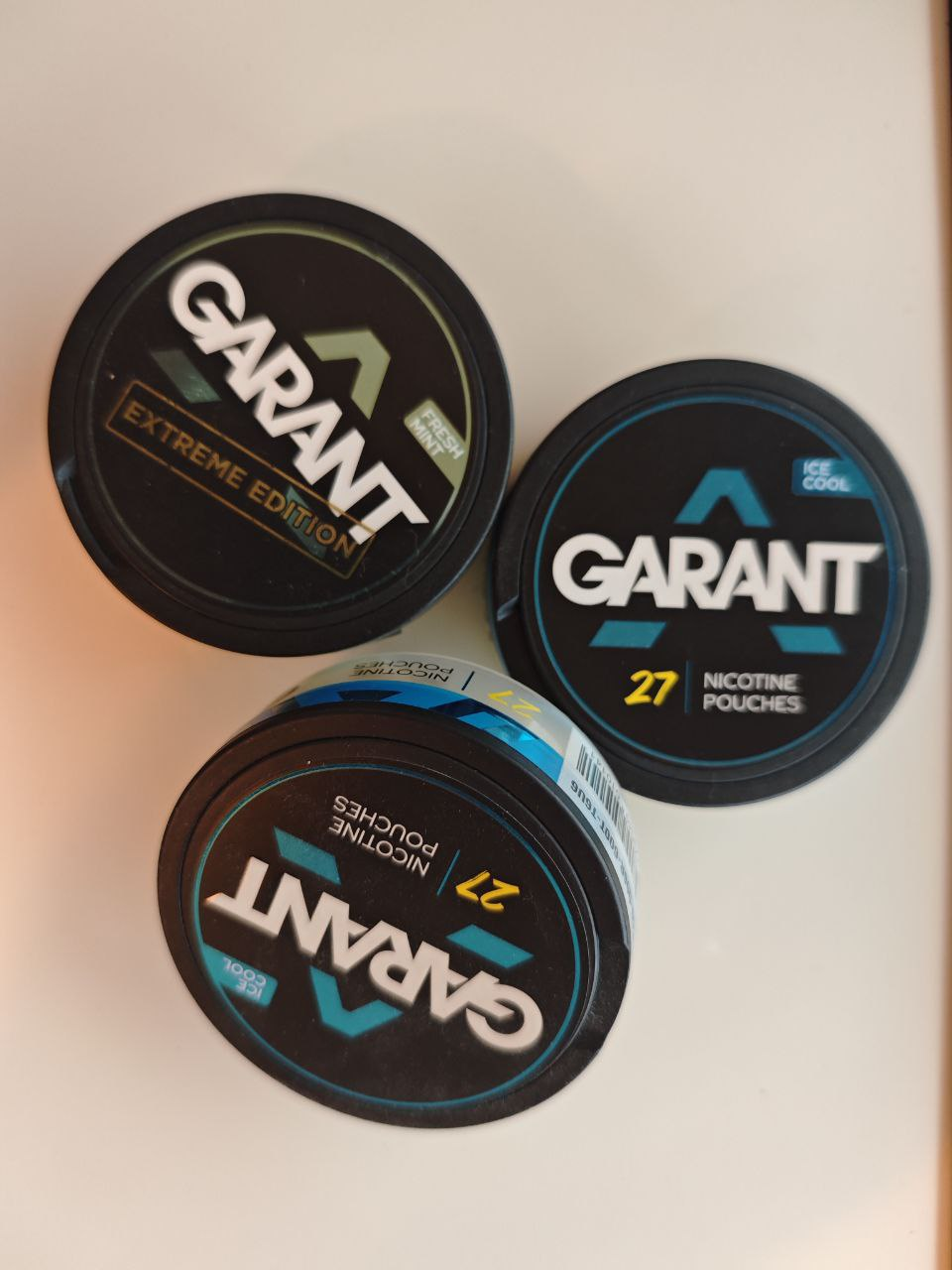
Garant nicotine pouches

Nicotine pouches are regulated differently around the world.

Although nicotine pouches are not heavily regulated in the European Union, some regulatory characteristics fall under the European Union CLP-Regulation (EC) 1272/2008.

=== Canada ===
In Canada, 4 mg nicotine pouches became widely available for sale in gas stations and convenience stores in 2023, when Imperial Tobacco Canada received approval for its Zonnic brand. They are marketed as a form of nicotine replacement therapy.

Their sale is covered under the Natural and Non-prescription Health Products Directorate; nicotine products in Canada with a standard dosage exceeding 4 mg are considered a prescription drug, therefore personal imports of nicotine pouches containing over 4 mg of nicotine per pouch are prohibited. Exceptions exist for those who are a health practitioner or medical practitioner, a drug manufacturer, a wholesale druggist, a pharmacist, or a resident of a foreign country while a visitor in Canada.

The launch of Zonnic was criticized by Health Minister Mark Holland, who felt that Imperial were not marketing them as a cessation product as licensed, and that the product was a "loophole" to "addict new young people to nicotine" due to flavouring, accessibility, and marketing appealing to youth (with its classification under natural health product regulations giving it looser restrictions on marketing than other tobacco products). Health Canada stated that regulation of their sale was the jurisdiction of provinces and territories, Imperial lobbied against regulation of the product, stating that it had voluntarily instructed retailers to sell it alongside other age-restricted tobacco products.

Due to local laws on health products, the pouches could only be sold in Quebec at pharmacies. In February 2024, British Columbia issued a ministerial order that prohibited nicotine pouches from being sold outside of pharmacies. That month, Holland threatened to regulate the product. In the 2024 Canadian federal budget, a provision was enacted which gives the Minister of Health power to restrict the sale, manufacture, importation, or promotion of health products, if they have a risk of harm associated with off-label use; Holland stated that the provision was intended primarily to target nicotine pouches.

In August 2024, Holland invoked this power to issue a ministerial order that prohibits Zonnic from being sold outside of pharmacies, required the recall of flavours besides menthol and mint, and ordered the company to change its packaging to include nicotine addiction warnings, and not market the product in such a way that it appeals to youth or promotes other uses beyond nicotine therapy.

In February 2025, the federal government also opened a public consultation on revising the Prescription Drug List entry for 'nicotine or its salts' to clarify the conditions under which nicotine buccal pouches may be sold without a prescription.

=== Finland ===
In Finland, until April 2023, nicotine pouches were classified for medicinal use. The Finnish Medicines Agency (FIMEA) stated that nicotine pouches cannot be classified as medicinal products unless they are specifically marketed for a medicinal purpose or it can be demonstrated in some other way that they are typically used as medicinal products.

On 1 August 2025, Finland introduced new restrictions on nicotine pouches under amendments to its Tobacco Act. The legislation prohibits domestic and cross-border distance sales of smokeless nicotine products, including nicotine pouches. Consequently, consumers cannot legally order nicotine pouches online for delivery to Finland.

As of 1 August 2026, all nicotine pouch boxes and the pouches inside must conform to the same visual appearance requirements, regardless of brand. Most notably, all nicotine pouch boxes must be Pantone 448 C brown-green, may not present brand logos or any other features intended to promote sales.

=== France ===
Nicotine pouches, gums and pearls are due to be banned in France from 1 April 2026. The proposed ban followed earlier warnings from the French Agency for Food, Environment and Occupational Health and Safety (ANSES), which expressed concerns about potential toxicity risks and the possibility that certain product presentations could appeal to adolescents. A government decree published in September 2025 cited an increase in calls to French poison-control related to nicotine pouch exposures, rising from three cases in 2020 to eighty-six cases in 2022. These reports contributed to ongoing policy discussions on product safety standards and appropriate regulatory pathways for emerging nicotine products.

=== Germany ===
There are no specific regulations pertaining to nicotine pouches in Germany. They are classified as novel food products, and their sale is illegal since nicotine is not an approved food ingredient. They can nevertheless be purchased online.

=== India ===
The Ministry of health and Family Welfare directed Indian states to take enforcement action on September 19, 2026, against the sale of nicotine pouches, citing their increasing availability through online and offline channels and concerns about nicotine exposure, particularly among children.

=== Norway ===
In Norway, the sale of nicotine pouches in general stores is banned because they are classified as a new nicotine product by the Norwegian Directorate of Health.

Tobacco-free nicotine pouches were for sale in Norway from 2014 to 2018, under the name Epok. In June 2018 the Norwegian Directorate of Health forced British American Tobacco Norway to remove Epok from sale. The Norwegian Directorate of Health argued that since Epok didn't contain any tobacco, it was a new form of nicotine product, distinct from the other forms of snus approved in Norway. Approval for the nicotine pouch brand ZYN had already been rejected twice for a very similar product. Within days of the ban, Epok was re-introduced to the Norwegian market, with a minute amount of bleached tobacco added, to qualify as snus, an already approved form of nicotine product. As of July 2025, Epok is still sold by Norwegian grocery stores.

=== Spain ===
In Spain, nicotine pouches became subject to a specific excise tax in April 2025 under legislation introduced by Law 7/2024, which amended the country's Excise Duties Act (Law 38/1992). The tax is set at €0.10 per gram of product and applies in mainland Spain and the Balearic Islands, excluding the Canary Islands, Ceuta and Melilla.

In January 2025, Spain notified the European Commission of draft regulations concerning the manufacture, presentation and marketing of tobacco-related products, including nicotine pouches. The proposal included a maximum nicotine content of 0.99 mg per pouch and restrictions on flavourings.

In July 2026, the Spanish government approved the submission of a broader tobacco-control bill to Parliament. The proposed reforms addressed newer nicotine products, including nicotine pouches, alongside conventional tobacco and electronic cigarettes.

Spanish excise legislation also provides limited exemptions for nicotine pouches brought into the country by travelers or sent between private individuals. Travelers over the age of 17 may qualify for an excise-tax exemption when personally carrying up to 200 nicotine pouches. Occasional, non-commercial shipments between private individuals may qualify for an exemption of up to 30 pouches, subject to the applicable statutory conditions.

=== Sweden ===
Nicotine pouches are popularly known in Swedish as vitt snus, literally "white snus". As such they are not considered a totally distinct thing from snus; snus is also referred to as brunt snus, "brown snus", to distinguish it from nicotine pouches.

Sweden regulated tobacco-free nicotine products, including nicotine pouches, under the Act (2022:1257) on Tobacco- Free Nicotine Products, which entered into force on 1 August 2022. The law establishes requirements for product composition, health warnings, packaging and labelling, bans sales to persons under 18 years of age, and restricts the marketing of such products in line with the country's broader tobacco control framework.

=== Switzerland ===
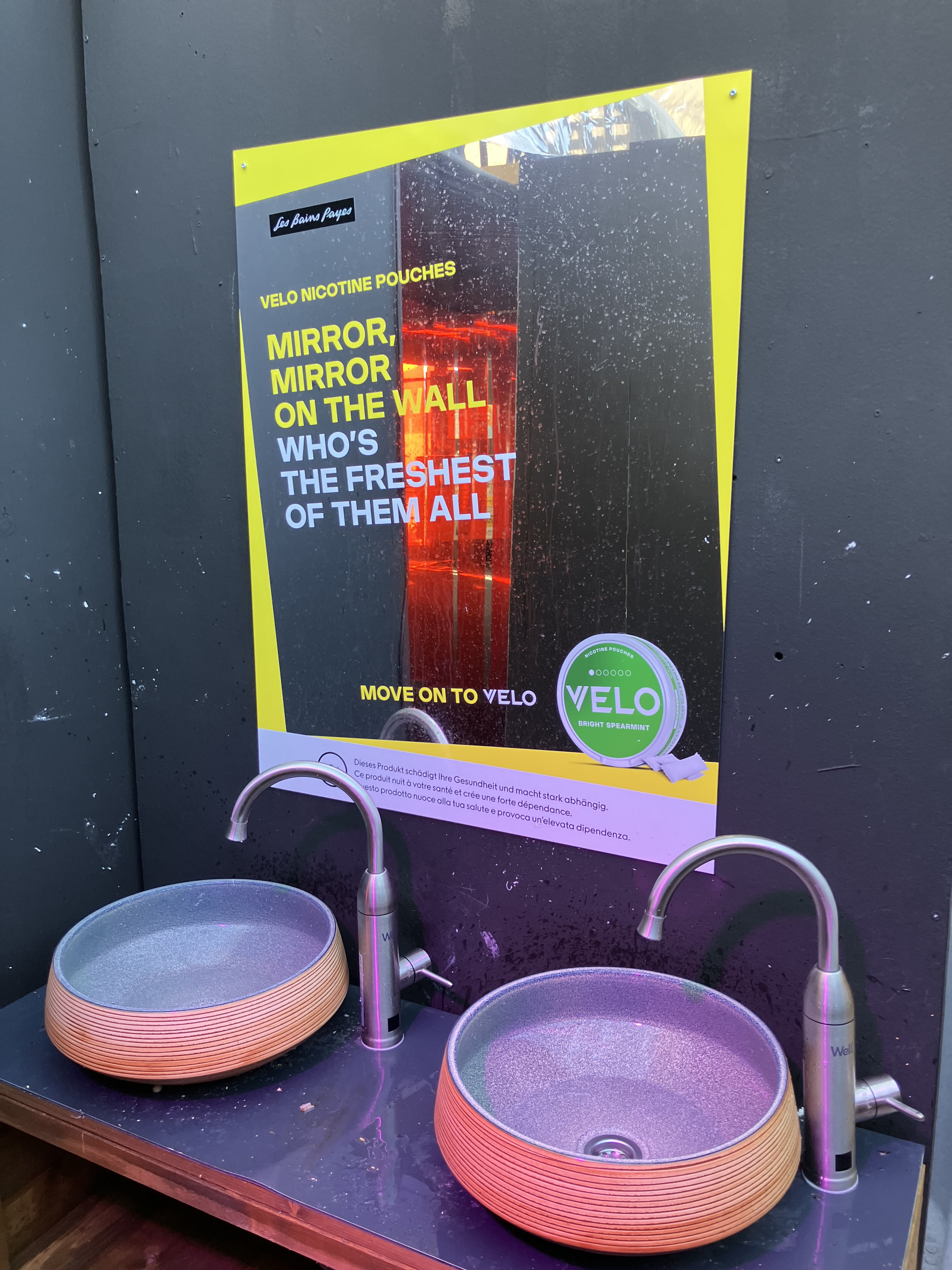
Advertisement for nicotine pouches at the 2025 Montreux Jazz Festival (Switzerland).

In the second half of the 2010s, nicotine pouches arrived on the Swiss market. The revised Tobacco Products Act and Tobacco Products Ordinance entered into force in Switzerland on 1 October 2024. Nicotine-containing products for oral use, including nicotine pouches and other tobacco-free nicotine products are regulated. The legislation establishes national minimum-age requirements for purchase at 18 years-old, introduces advertising and sponsorship restrictions, and provides for the regulation of similar products that may be introduced in the future.

=== United Arab Emirates ===
From 29 July 2025, tobacco-free nicotine pouches became legally available for sale in the United Arab Emirates, following the adoption of a new cabinet resolution establishing technical standards for these products. The regulation includes requirements on quality, labelling, and packaging, sets a minimum purchase age of 18 years, and positions nicotine pouches as part of a harm-reduction strategy intended to support smokers seeking alternatives to cigarettes.

=== United Kingdom ===
Nicotine pouches are sold in supermarkets in the United Kingdom, and are not covered by tobacco or medical laws. In 2022, the Action on Smoking and Health group called for a regulatory framework covering all nicotine products.

In 2024, the UK Government introduced the Tobacco and Vapes Bill, which proposed prohibiting the sale of nicotine pouches to people under 18 years of age and would also grant ministers powers to regulate flavours, packaging, product display for nicotine products, and the registration of nicotine products. The Bill also proposes restrictions on advertising, promotion, and sponsorship, and forms part of a wider government strategy aimed at reducing nicotine and tobacco use among children and young people.

Survey data reported to Parliament in 2025 indicated that approximately 1.2 percent of 11 to 18 year olds were current users of nicotine pouches. Awareness of nicotine pouches among 11 to 17 year olds in the UK increased from 38 percent in 2024 to 43 percent in 2025, although awareness does not necessarily translate into experimentation or regular use. These findings contribute to ongoing discussions about youth-access controls, product presentation, and enforcement practices, while most public health policy continues to focus on preventing underage access without overlooking the potential harm-reduction role of nicotine pouches for adult smokers.

=== United States ===
In 2021, the American College of Chest Physicians (CHEST) and other health organizations urged the US Food and Drug Administration (FDA) to address regulatory gaps related to synthetic nicotine products, including nicotine pouches, citing concerns about youth usage and public health impact. The US Food and Drug Administration (FDA) has extended its oversight to nicotine pouches under the Family Smoking Prevention and Tobacco Control Act, requiring manufacturers to submit Premarket Tobacco Product Applications (PMTAs) for approval.

In January 2025, the FDA granted the first US marketing authorizations for 20 Zyn nicotine pouch products through the PMTA pathway, concluding that the products exposed users to substantially lower levels of certain harmful chemicals than cigarettes and some smokeless tobacco, while emphasizing that they still carry health risks and are intended for use only by adults. However, public health organisations note that most nicotine pouch products currently sold in the United States have not received FDA authorisation and are therefore being marketed illegally.

=== South Korea ===
Nicotine pouches are sold online and through selected retail channels in South Korea, where they are not yet subject to a comprehensive regulatory framework equivalent to traditional tobacco products. As awareness of alternative nicotine products grows, discussions around potential regulation and youth access restrictions have gradually increased.

One of the representative nicotine pouch brands in South Korea is ZZU, which is marketed as a locally developed brand within the emerging nicotine pouch market.
