= List of Nicotiana species =

The 79 accepted and known species of Nicotiana include:

- Nicotiana acaulis Speg.
- Nicotiana acuminata (Graham) Hook. – manyflower tobacco, many-flowered tobacco
- Nicotiana africana Merxm.
- Nicotiana alata Link & Otto – jasmine tobacco, sweet tobacco, winged tobacco, Persian tobacco, tanbaku (Persian)
- Nicotiana ameghinoi Speg.
- Nicotiana amplexicaulis N. T. Burb.
- Nicotiana arentsii Goodsp.
- Nicotiana attenuata Torrey ex S. Watson – coyote tobacco
- Nicotiana azambujae L. B. Smith & Downs
- Nicotiana benavidesii Goodsp.
- Nicotiana benthamiana Domin – benth, benthi
- Nicotiana bonariensis Lehm.
- Nicotiana burbidgeae Symon
- Nicotiana cavicola N. T. Burb.
- Nicotiana clevelandii A. Gray – Cleveland's tobacco
- Nicotiana cordifolia Phil.
- Nicotiana corymbosa J. Rémy
- Nicotiana cutleri D'Arcy
- Nicotiana excelsior (J. M. Black) J. M. Black
- Nicotiana forgetiana Hemsl.
- Nicotiana forsteri Roem. & Schult. (previously designated N. debneyi)
- Nicotiana fragrans Hooker
- Nicotiana glauca Graham – tree tobacco, Brazilian tree tobacco, shrub tobacco, wild tobacco, tobacco plant, tobacco bush, tobacco tree, mustard tree
- Nicotiana glutinosa L.
- Nicotiana goodspeedii H.-M. Wheeler
- Nicotiana gossei Domin
- Nicotiana hesperis N. T. Burb.
- Nicotiana heterantha Kenneally & Symon
- Nicotiana ingulba J. M. Black
- Nicotiana kawakamii Y. Ohashi
- Nicotiana knightiana Goodsp.
- Nicotiana langsdorffii Weinm. – Langsdorff's tobacco
- Nicotiana linearis Phil.
- Nicotiana longibracteata Phil.
- Nicotiana longiflora Cav. – longflower tobacco, long-flowered tobacco
- Nicotiana maritima H.-M. Wheeler
- Nicotiana megalosiphon Van Huerck & Müll. Arg.
- Nicotiana miersii J. Rémy
- Nicotiana mutabilis Stehmann & Samir– color-changing tobacco, flowering tobacco
- Nicotiana nesophila I. M. Johnston
- Nicotiana noctiflora Hook.
- Nicotiana nudicaulis S. Watson
- Nicotiana occidentalis H.-M. Wheeler – native tobacco
- Nicotiana obtusifolia M. Martens & Galeotti (previously designated N. trigonophylla) – desert tobacco, punche, "tabaquillo"
- Nicotiana otophora Griseb.
- Nicotiana paa Mart. Crov.
- Nicotiana palmeri A. Gray
- Nicotiana paniculata L. – smallflower tobacco, small-flowered tobacco
- Nicotiana pauciflora J. Rémy
- Nicotiana petuniodes (Griseb.) Millán.
- Nicotiana plumbaginifolia Viv. – Tex-Mex tobacco
- Nicotiana quadrivalvis Pursh (replaces the following older classifications: N. multivalvis Lindl., N. plumbaginifolia Viv. var. bigelovii Torrey, N. bigelovii (Torrey) S. Watson) – Indian tobacco
- Nicotiana raimondii J. F. Macbr.
- Nicotiana repanda Willd. – fiddleleaf tobacco, fiddle-leafed tobacco
- Nicotiana rotundifolia Lindl.
- Nicotiana rustica L. – Aztec tobacco, strong tobacco, mapacho
- Nicotiana setchellii Goodsp.
- Nicotiana simulans N. T. Burb.
- Nicotiana solanifolia Walp.
- Nicotiana spegazzinii Millán
- Nicotiana stenocarpa H.-M. Wheeler
- Nicotiana stocktonii Brandegee
- Nicotiana suaveolens Lehm. – Australian tobacco
- Nicotiana sylvestris Speg. & Comes – woodland tobacco, flowering tobacco, South American tobacco
- Nicotiana tabacum L. – common tobacco, domesticated tobacco, cultivated tobacco, commercial tobacco (grown for the production of cigars, cigarillos, cigarettes, chewing tobacco, dipping tobacco, snuff, snus, etc.)
- Nicotiana thrysiflora Bitter ex Goodsp.
- Nicotiana tomentosa Ruiz & Pav.
- Nicotiana tomentosiformis Goodsp.
- Nicotiana truncata D. E. Symon
- Nicotiana umbratica N. T. Burb.
- Nicotiana undulata Ruiz & Pav.
- Nicotiana velutina H.-M. Wheeler
- Nicotiana wigandioides Koch & Fintelm.
- Nicotiana wuttkei Clarkson & Symon

Five additional species that are listed by APNI are:

- Nicotiana gascoynica M.W. Chase & Christenh.
- Nicotiana hoskingii M.W. Chase, Palsson & Christenh.
- Nicotiana insecticida M.W. Chase & Christenh.
- Nicotiana karijini M.W. Chase & Christenh.
- Nicotiana yandinga M.W. Chase & christenh.
