= Indian tobacco =

Indian tobacco may refer to:

- Kinnikinnick, a smoking product made from a mixture of leaves and bark
- Lobelia inflata, a species of Lobelia native to eastern North America
- Nicotiana quadrivalvis, a species of tobacco native to the western United States

== See also ==
- Indian Tobacco Company now ITC, an Indian conglomerate
