= N. africana =

N. africana may refer to:

- Neurospora africana, a fungus species in the genus Neurospora
- Nicotiana africana, a plant species endemic to Namibia
- Nocardia africana, a gram-positive bacterium species in the genus Nocardia

== See also ==
- Africana (disambiguation)
