= Nicotiana setchellii =

Scientific classification
- Kingdom: Plantae
- Clade: Tracheophytes
- Clade: Angiosperms
- Clade: Eudicots
- Clade: Asterids
- Order: Solanales
- Family: Solanaceae
- Genus: Nicotiana
- Species: N. setchellii

Binomial name
- Nicotiana setchellii Goodsp.

Species of flowering plant

Nicotania setchellii is a Nicotiana species of wild tobacco. It is native to Peru.
