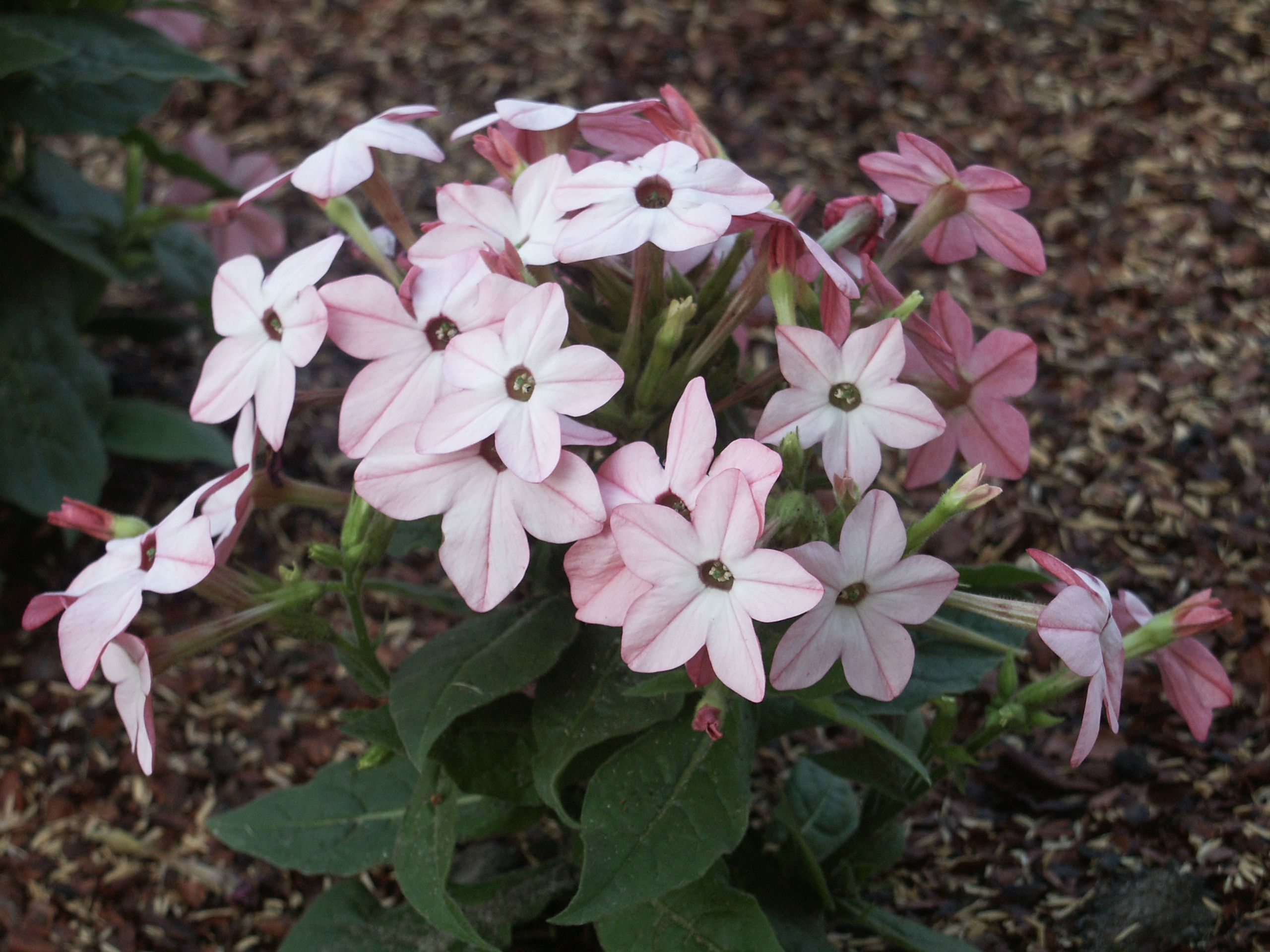

Scientific classification
- Kingdom: Plantae
- Clade: Tracheophytes
- Clade: Angiosperms
- Clade: Eudicots
- Clade: Asterids
- Order: Solanales
- Family: Solanaceae
- Genus: Nicotiana
- Species: N. × sanderi

Binomial name
- Nicotiana × sanderi Mast.

Synonyms
- Nicotiana × sanderae hort.; Nicotiana × sanderae W.Watson

= Nicotiana × sanderi =

Species of flowering plant

Nicotiana × sanderi, also known as Nicotiana × sanderae, is a hybrid of the tobacco species Nicotiana alata (syn. N. affinis) and Nicotiana forgetiana (syn. N. rubra). It is the most common ornamental Nicotiana variety found and sold in the United Kingdom. Nicotiana × sanderi requires soft soil mixed with sand to thrive. The plant will grow to heights of 3 feet (0.91 m) and will give off a sweet scent in the evening, like most Nicotiana plants. Nicotiana × sanderi is not hardy against frost and will die if it comes in contact with it; however, it withstands drought. Because of its size, N. × sanderi is used as a house or garden plant.

An analytical study published in 1963 concluded that N. × sanderi leaves have a low nicotine concentration and a moderately low nornicotine concentration.

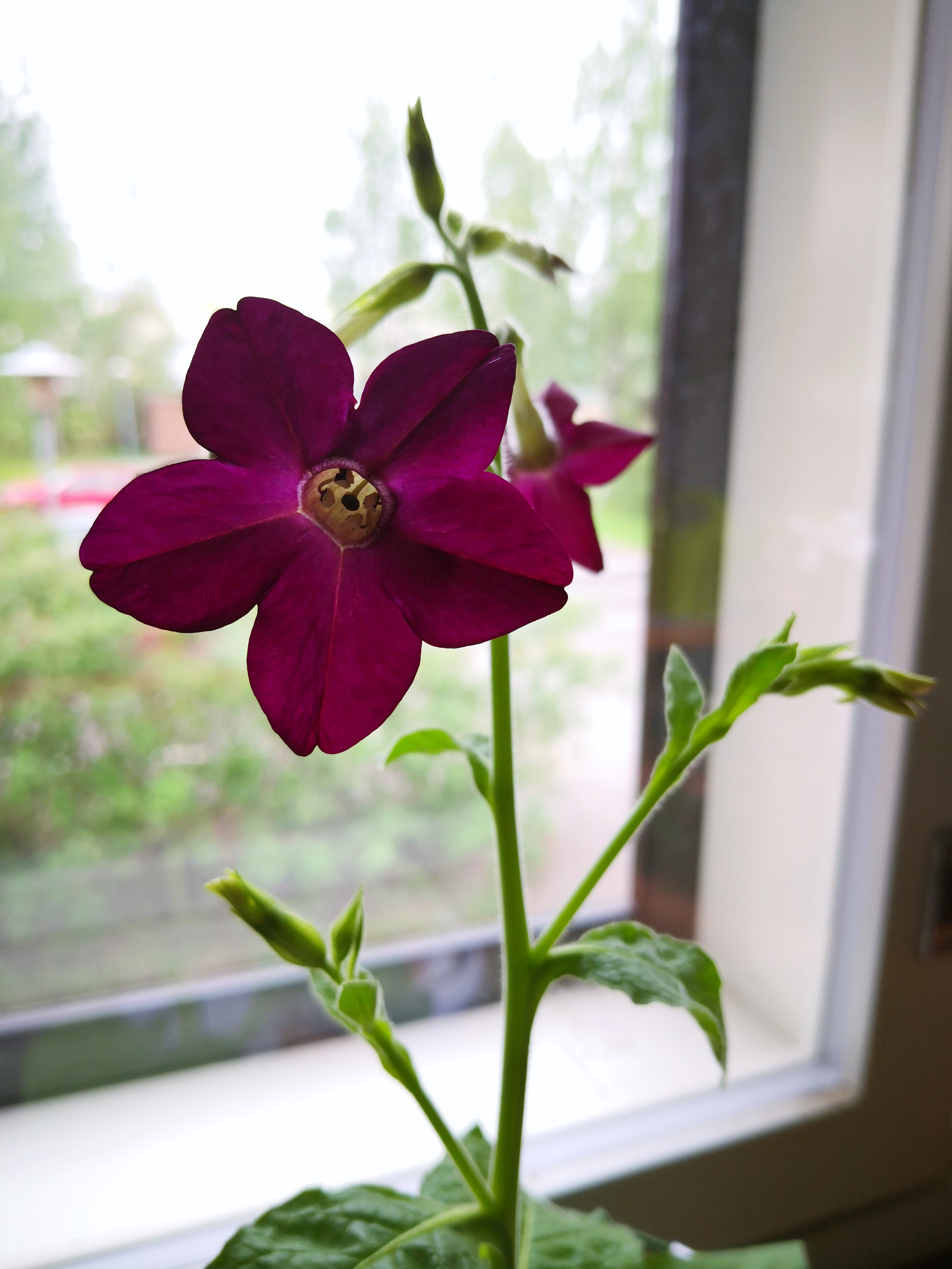

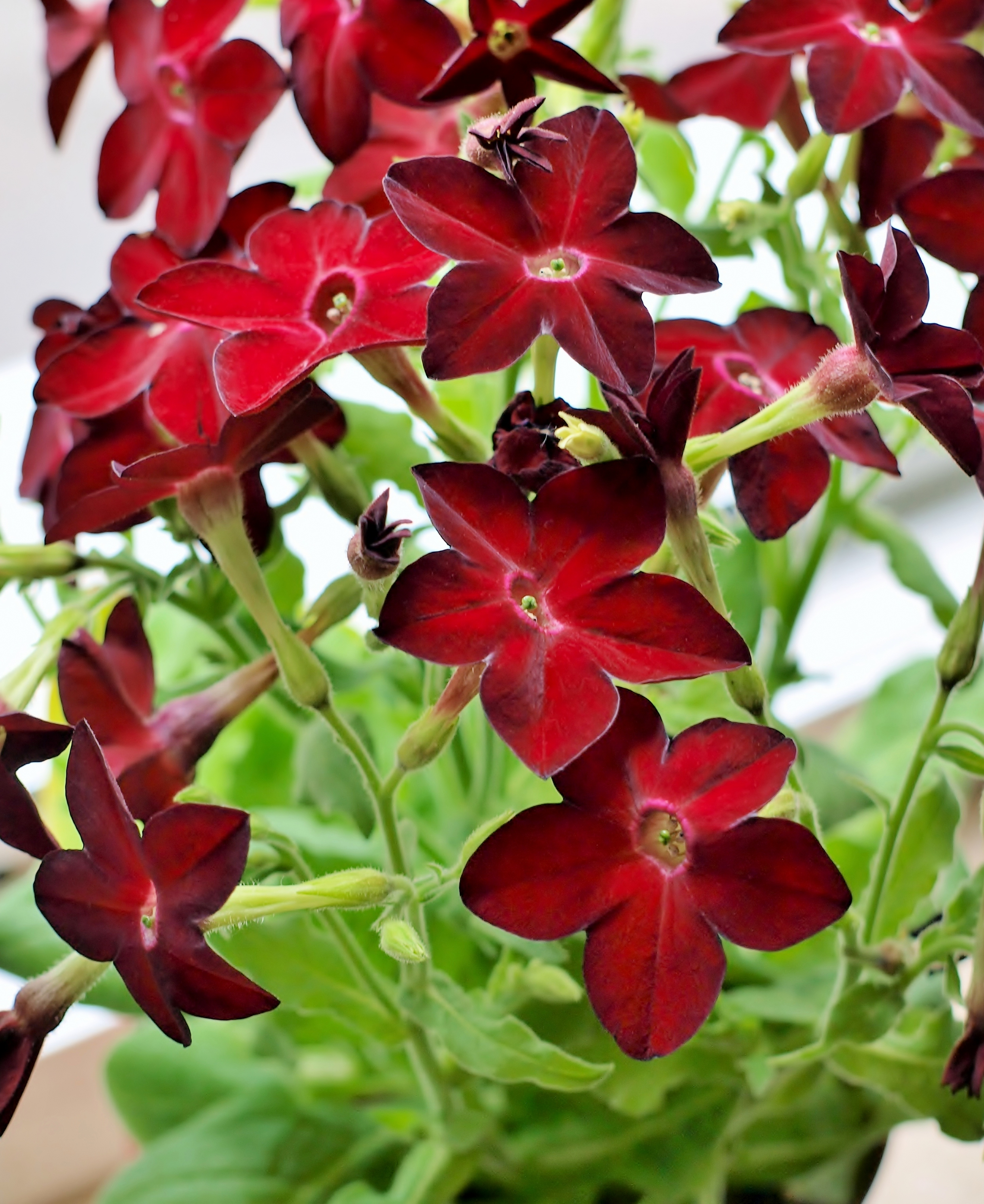

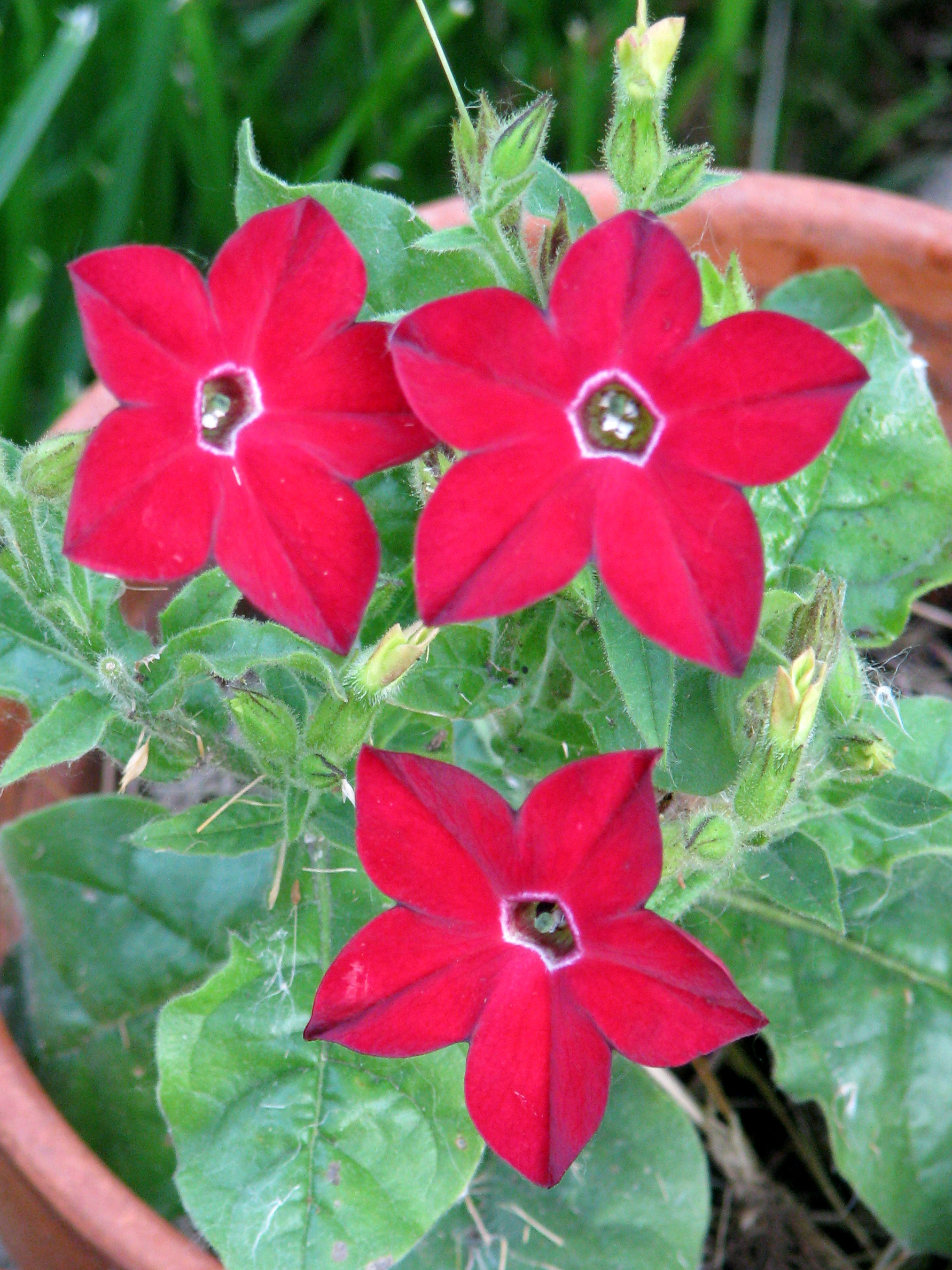

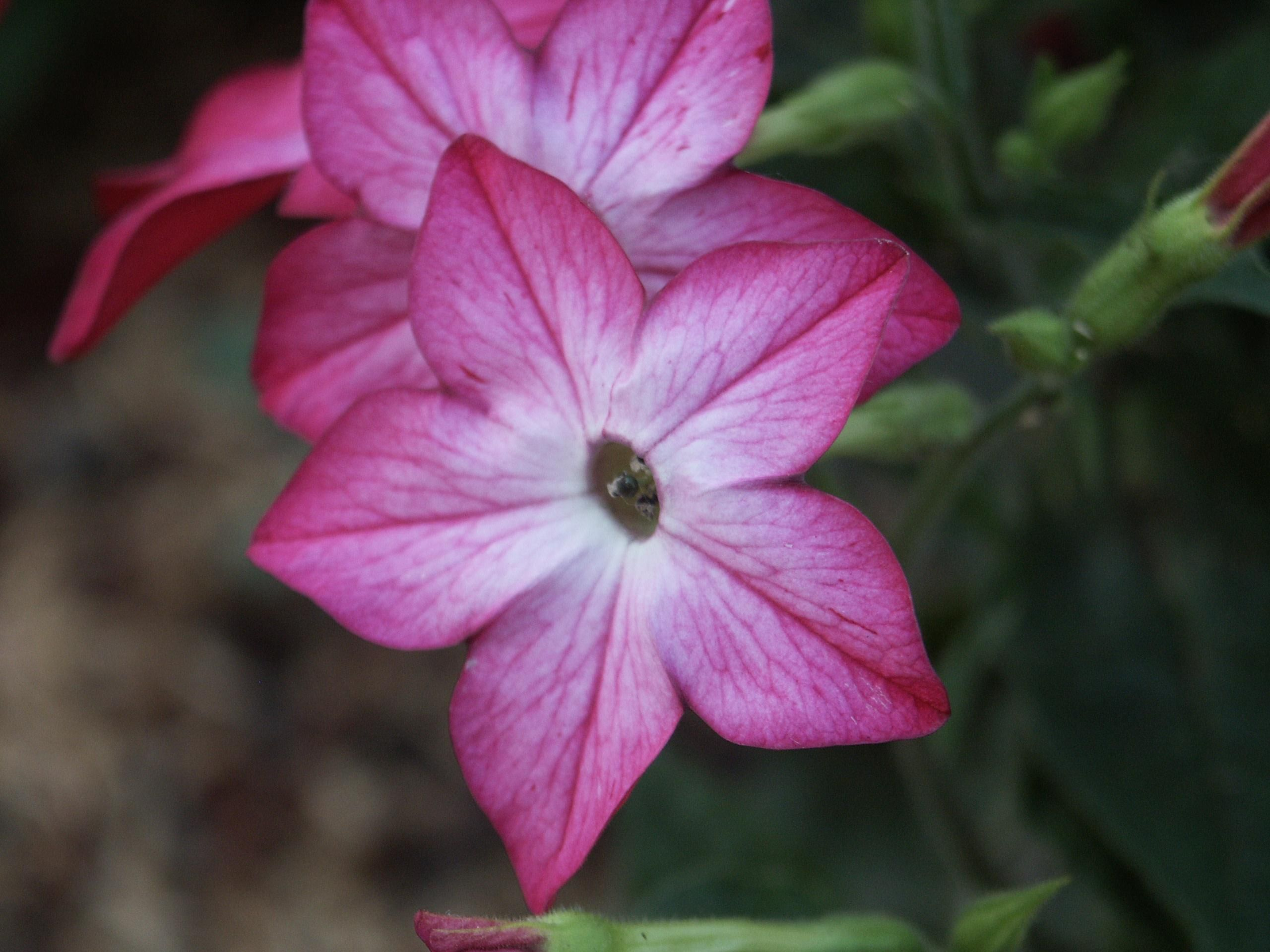

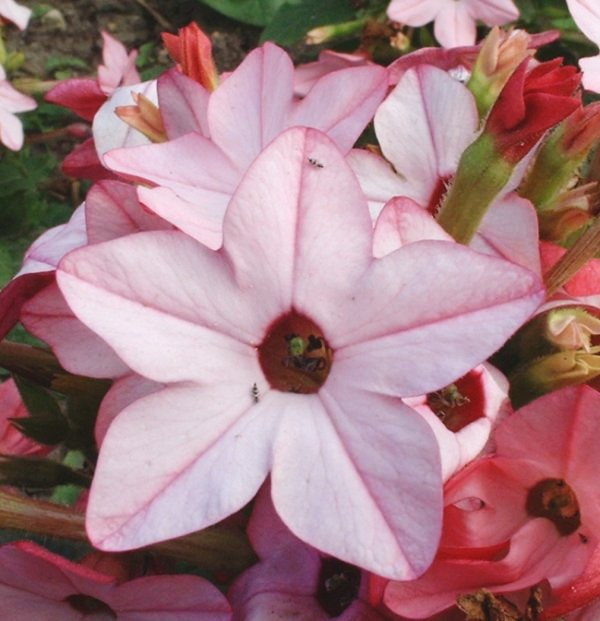

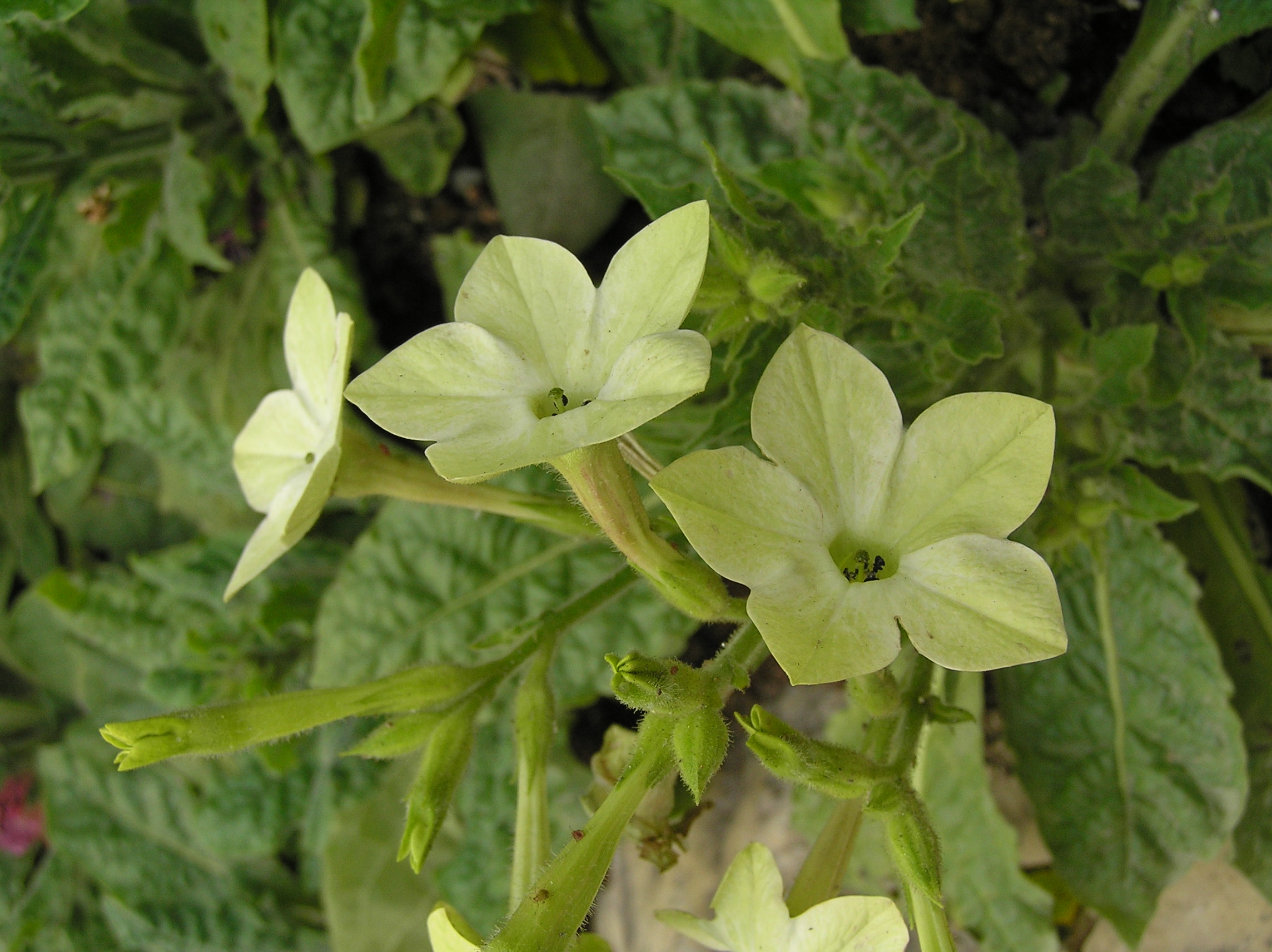

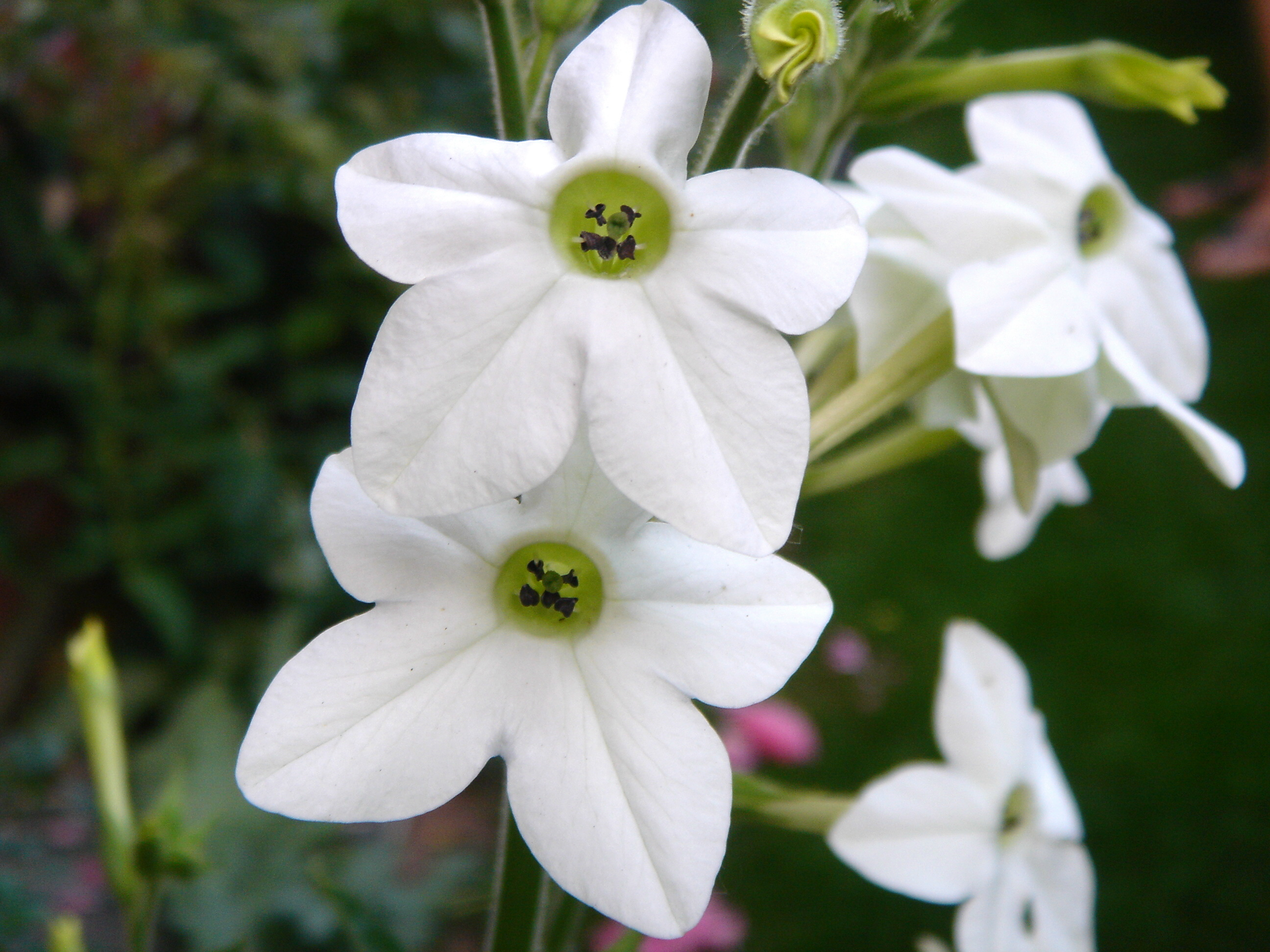

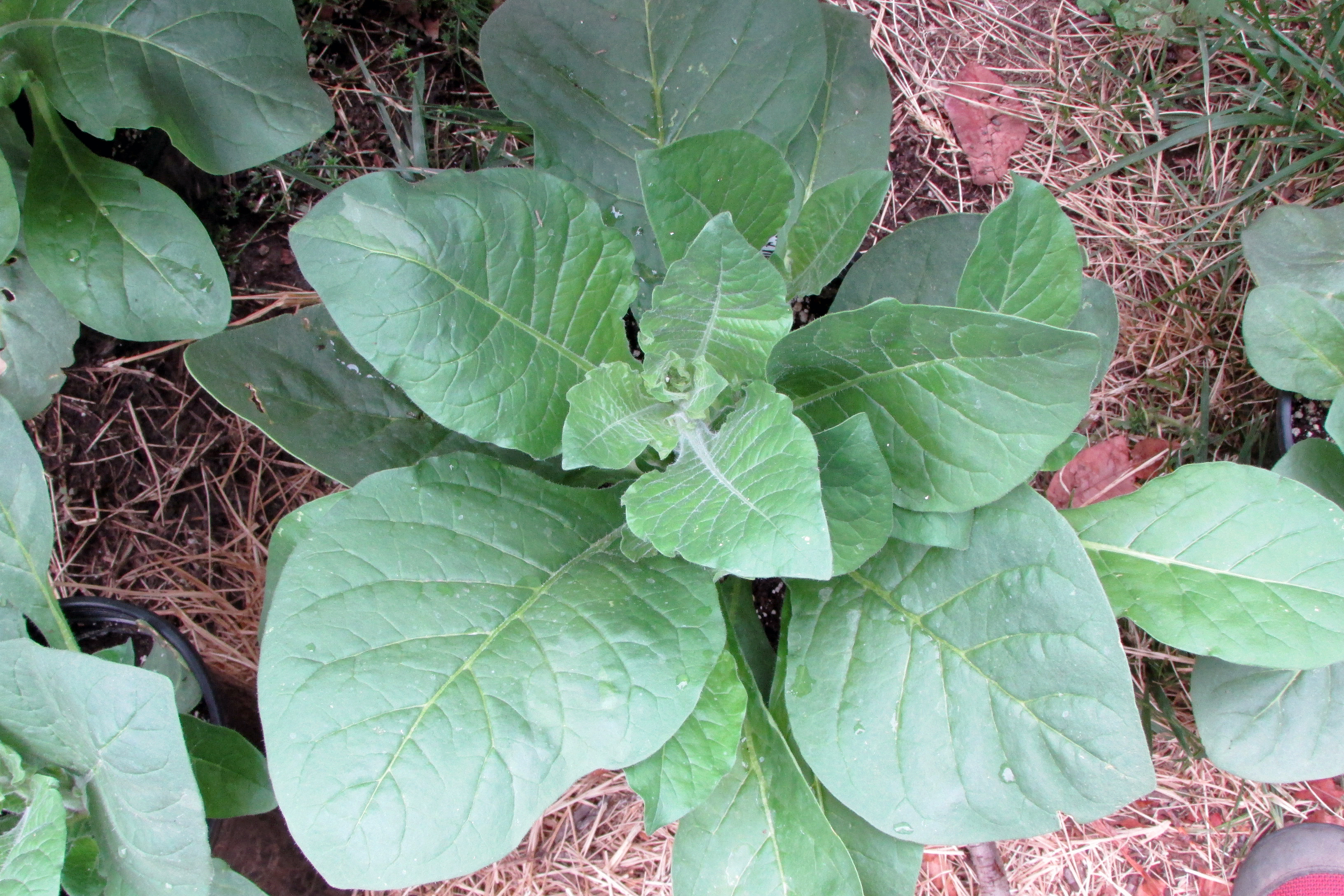
