= N. exigua =

N. exigua may refer to:

- Nassula exigua, a ciliate protist
- Nectriella exigua, a sac fungus
- Neopetrosia exigua, a marine sponge
- Nicotiana exigua, a tobacco plant
- Nucula exigua, a nut clam
- Nymphoides exigua, an aquatic plant
