= Euxoa bostoniensis =

Scientific classification
- Kingdom: Animalia
- Phylum: Arthropoda
- Clade: Pancrustacea
- Class: Insecta
- Order: Lepidoptera
- Superfamily: Noctuoidea
- Family: Noctuidae
- Genus: Euxoa
- Species: E. bostoniensis

Binomial name
- Euxoa bostoniensis (Grote, 1874)

Synonyms
- Agrotis bostoniensis Grote, 1874

Species of moth

Euxoa bostoniensis, the Boston dart or drab cutworm, is a moth of the family Noctuidae. It is found from Ontario and Maine to North Carolina, west to Missouri, north to Michigan. It has also been recorded from Florida, California and South Dakota.

The wingspan is 40–45 mm. Adults are on wing in May and again from September to October.

The larvae feed on Nicotiana species, but the species also occurs in areas where tobacco does not occur.
