= John William Gregg =

American architect (1880 - 1969)

John William Gregg (January 8, 1880, New Hampshire - 1969 Berkeley), was a 20th-century professor of landscape architecture at the University of California, Berkeley. Gregg designed the townsites of California census-designated places Delhi, California and Ballico, California as twentieth century model agriculture townships. He and University of California, Los Angeles architect William Hays, designed the original Beaux-Arts architecture master concept plans for the University of California, Davis's campus in the early 1920s. Gregg worked with University of California Botanical Garden director Thomas Harper Goodspeed to move the botanical garden from its central campus location to the hills above the campus.

== Education ==
Gregg was raised on a small ranch in rural New Hampshire. He received his B.S. from the Massachusetts Agricultural College.

== Career ==
He started the Landscape Architecture program at Pennsylvania State College. He then followed Dr. Hunt the dean of the college to the University of California Berkeley, where he started the Landscape Architecture program. The Landscape design program was originally under the College of Agriculture, as a separate department.

== Bibliography ==
- John Gregg, ‘John William Gregg, a Half-century Of Landscape architecture; an Interview Conducted By Suzanne B. Riess.’, 1965, Environmental Design.
- John Gregg, John Gregg Collection (Berkeley, CA, 1937) <http://oskicat.berkeley.edu/record=b15810475~S1>.
- John W. Gregg Collection, Environmental Design Archives, University of California, Berkeley
