= Nicotiana acaulis =

Scientific classification
- Kingdom: Plantae
- Clade: Tracheophytes
- Clade: Angiosperms
- Clade: Eudicots
- Clade: Asterids
- Order: Solanales
- Family: Solanaceae
- Genus: Nicotiana
- Species: N. acaulis

Binomial name
- Nicotiana acaulis Speg.

Species of flowering plant

Nicotania acaulis is a Nicotiana species of wild tobacco. It is native to Argentina and Chile.
