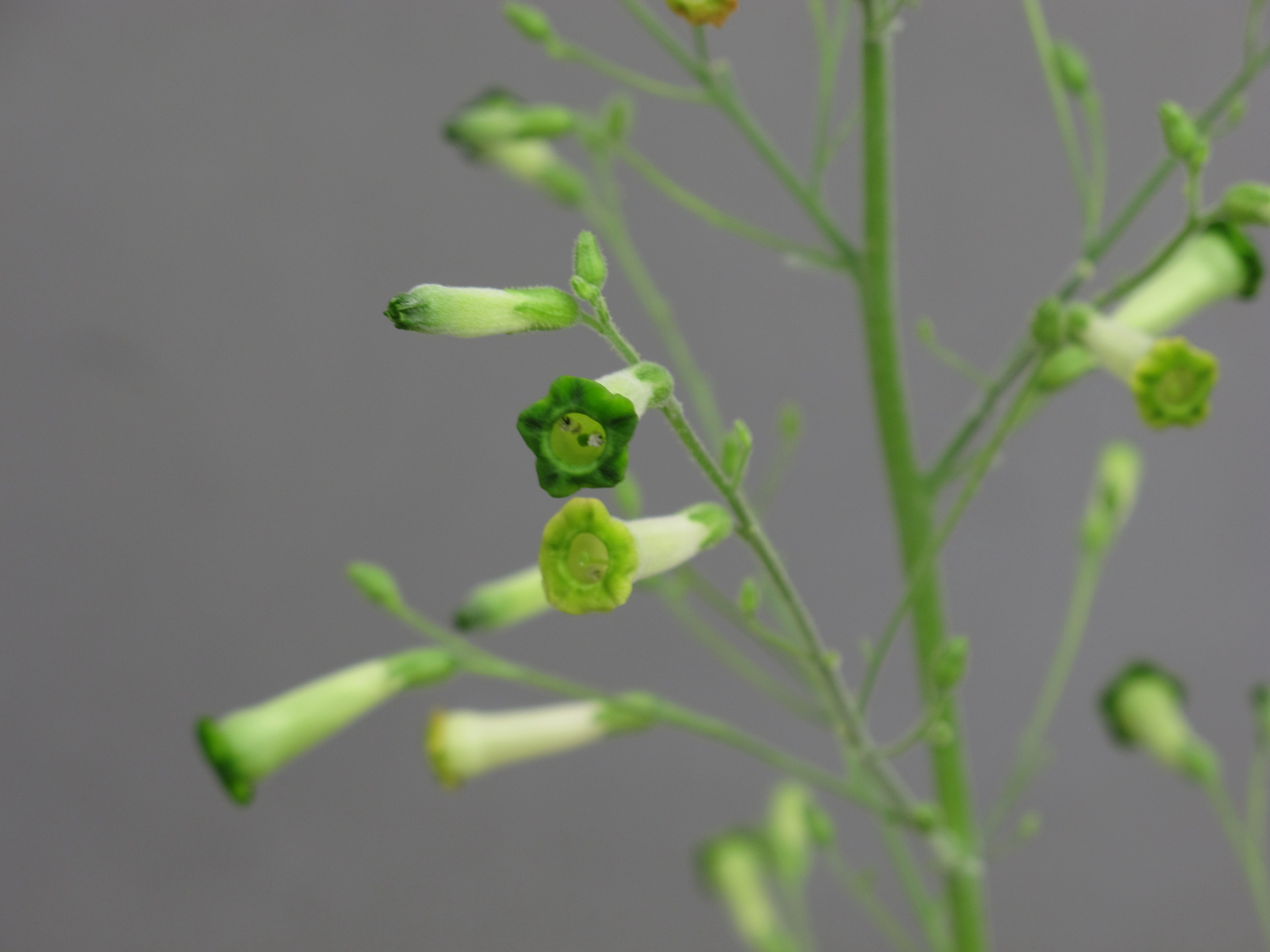
- Close-up of flowers
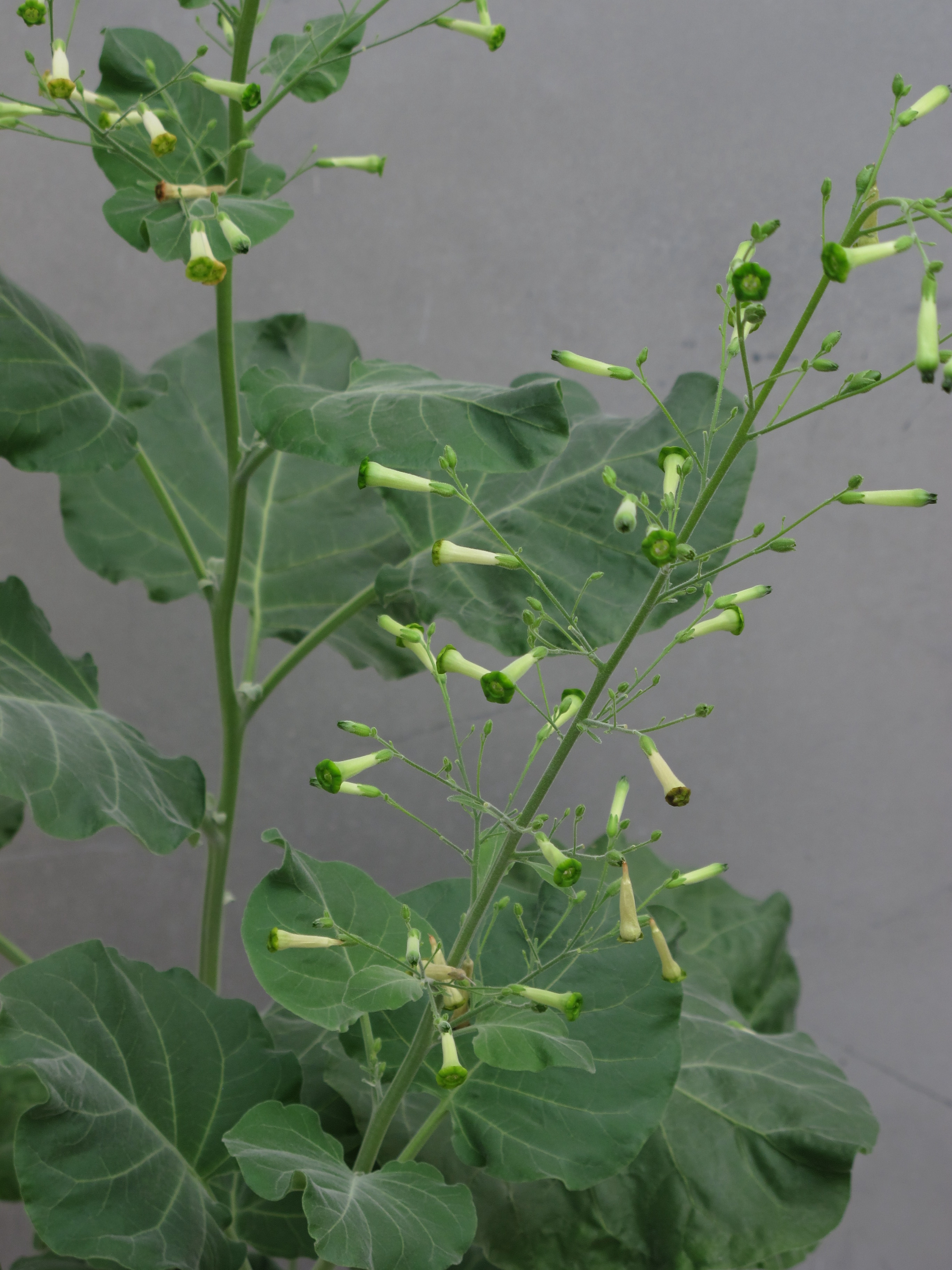
- Habit

Scientific classification
- Kingdom: Plantae
- Clade: Embryophytes
- Clade: Tracheophytes
- Clade: Angiosperms
- Clade: Eudicots
- Clade: Asterids
- Order: Solanales
- Family: Solanaceae
- Genus: Nicotiana
- Species: N. paniculata

Binomial name
- Nicotiana paniculata L.

Synonyms
- Nicotiana pallida Salisb.; Nicotiana viridiflora Lehm.

= Nicotiana paniculata =

Species of flowering plant

Nicotiana paniculata, the small-flowered tobacco, is a species of flowering plant in the family Solanaceae, native to western Peru, and introduced to the Canary Islands. It is a parent of the economically important species Nicotiana rustica (Aztec tobacco).
