= Nicotiana insecticida =

Scientific classification
- Kingdom: Plantae
- Clade: Tracheophytes
- Clade: Angiosperms
- Clade: Eudicots
- Clade: Asterids
- Order: Solanales
- Family: Solanaceae
- Genus: Nicotiana
- Species: N. insecticida

Binomial name
- Nicotiana insecticida M. W. Chase & Christenh.

Species of tobacco plant

Nicotiana insecticida is a species of plant of the family Solanaceae native to Western Australia. A wild tobacco, it is covered in sticky glandular hairs that trap and kill small insects, including gnats, aphids, and flies. It is the first wild tobacco plant discovered to kill insects. It grows to a height of 1.5 m (4.9 ft) and has leaves that are between 3.6–20.2 cm (1 1/2–8 in) long and 1.1–8 cm (1/2–3 1/4 in) wide. The height of its flowering is in late winter to spring. Its white flowers regularly self-pollinate, producing dry fruit and seeds. The plants are annual and wither after fruiting. Often growing in the shade of mulga or gum trees or on the shady sides of rocks or in caves, it ranges from near the Indian Ocean in north-western Western Australia to central portions of the Northern Territory, mostly north of the Tropic of Capricorn. Botanists Mark Wayne Chase and Maarten J. M. Christenhusz wrote the species description in 2021. Nicotiana insecticida is remarkable in its insect trapping abilities. The species epithet, insecticida, is Latin for insect killer, and refers to this species killing many small insects with its extremely sticky hairs.
