= Pálsson =

Pálsson is an Icelandic patronymic, meaning son of Páll (Paul). In Icelandic names, the name is not strictly a surname as it is not a family name, but a patronymic. The name refers to:

- Brooke Palsson, Canadian actress
- Einar Pálsson (1925–1996), Icelandic scholar of Icelandic saga literature
- Gísli Pálsson (contemporary), Icelandic professor of anthropology, author, and editor
- Haukur Pálsson (born 1992), Icelandic basketball player
- Hermann Pálsson (1921–2002), Icelandic language scholar and translator
- Ögmundur Pálsson (c. 1475–1541), Icelandic Roman Catholic prelate
- Sveinn Pálsson (fl. 18th century), Icelandic glaciologist and vulcanologist
- Þorsteinn Pálsson (born 1947), Icelandic politician; Prime Minister of Iceland 1987–88
- Victor Pálsson (born 1991), Icelandic footballer
