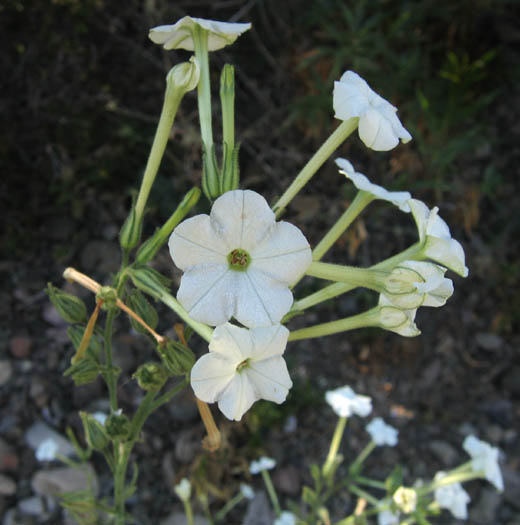

Scientific classification
- Kingdom: Plantae
- Clade: Tracheophytes
- Clade: Angiosperms
- Clade: Eudicots
- Clade: Asterids
- Order: Solanales
- Family: Solanaceae
- Genus: Nicotiana
- Species: N. acuminata

Binomial name
- Nicotiana acuminata (Graham) Hook.

Synonyms
- Petunia acuminata Graham

= Nicotiana acuminata =

Manyflower tobacco

Species of flowering plant

Nicotiana acuminata is a species of wild tobacco known by the English common name manyflower tobacco. It is native to Argentina and Chile but it is known on other continents, including North America and Australia, as an introduced species.

It is an annual herb exceeding a meter in maximum height. The leaf blades may be 25 centimeters long and are borne on petioles. The inflorescence bears several white or green-tinged flowers with tubular throats up to 4 centimeters long, their bases enclosed in green-striped sepals.

It was first described by Robert Graham in 1828 as Petunia acuminata, but was transferred to the genus, Nicotiana in 1829 by William Jackson Hooker

In On The Origin of Species, Charles Darwin mentions that N. acuminata is not a particularly distinct species, which is failed to fertilise or to be fertilised, by no less than eight other species of Nicotiana.
