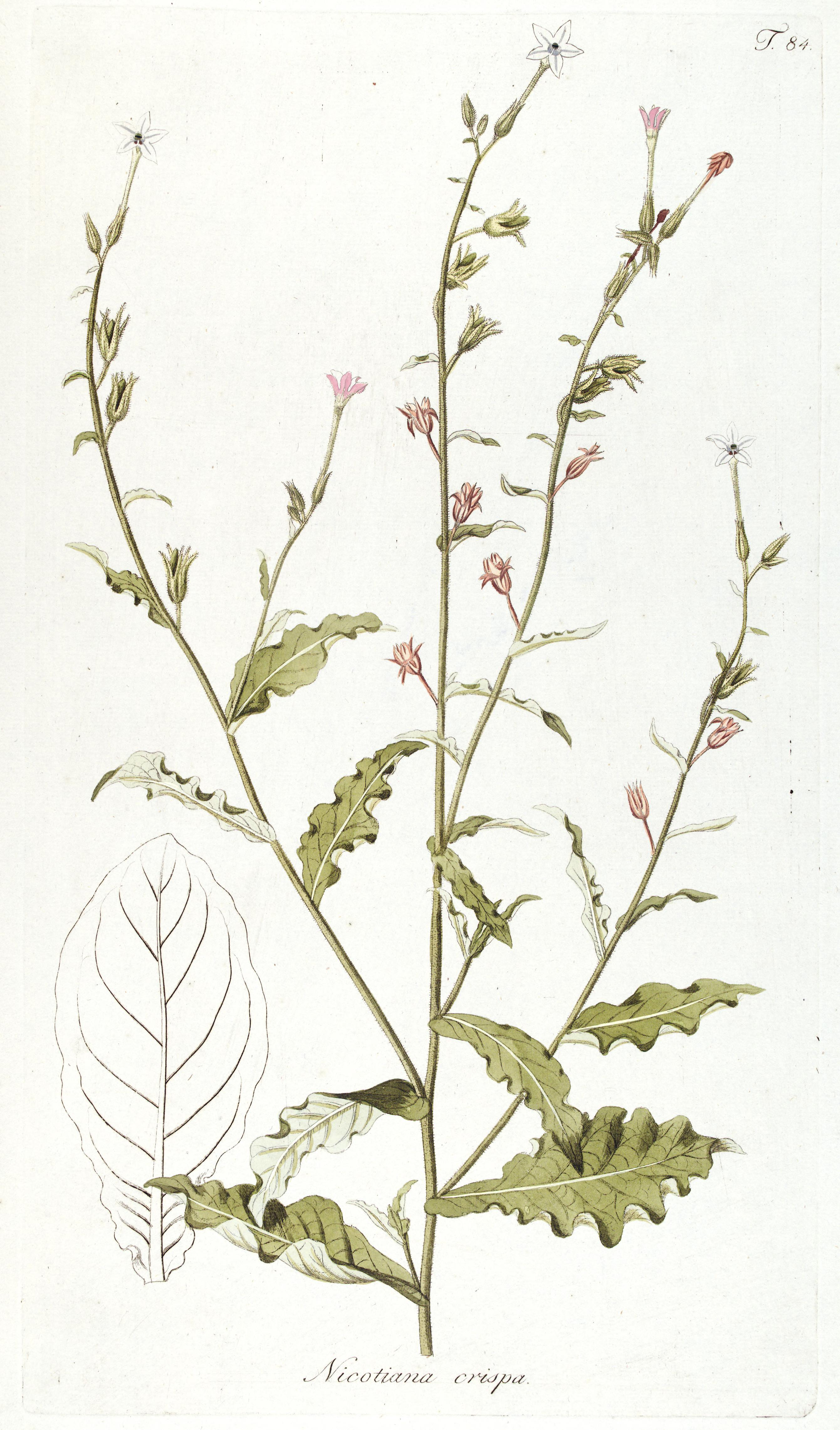

Scientific classification
- Kingdom: Plantae
- Clade: Tracheophytes
- Clade: Angiosperms
- Clade: Eudicots
- Clade: Asterids
- Order: Solanales
- Family: Solanaceae
- Genus: Nicotiana
- Species: N. plumbaginifolia

Binomial name
- Nicotiana plumbaginifolia Viv.

= Nicotiana plumbaginifolia =

Species of flowering plant

Nicotiana plumbaginifolia is a species of tobacco plant known as Tex-Mex tobacco. The species epithet, "plumbaginifolia", is from the leaves bearing similarity to those of the genus Plumbago.
