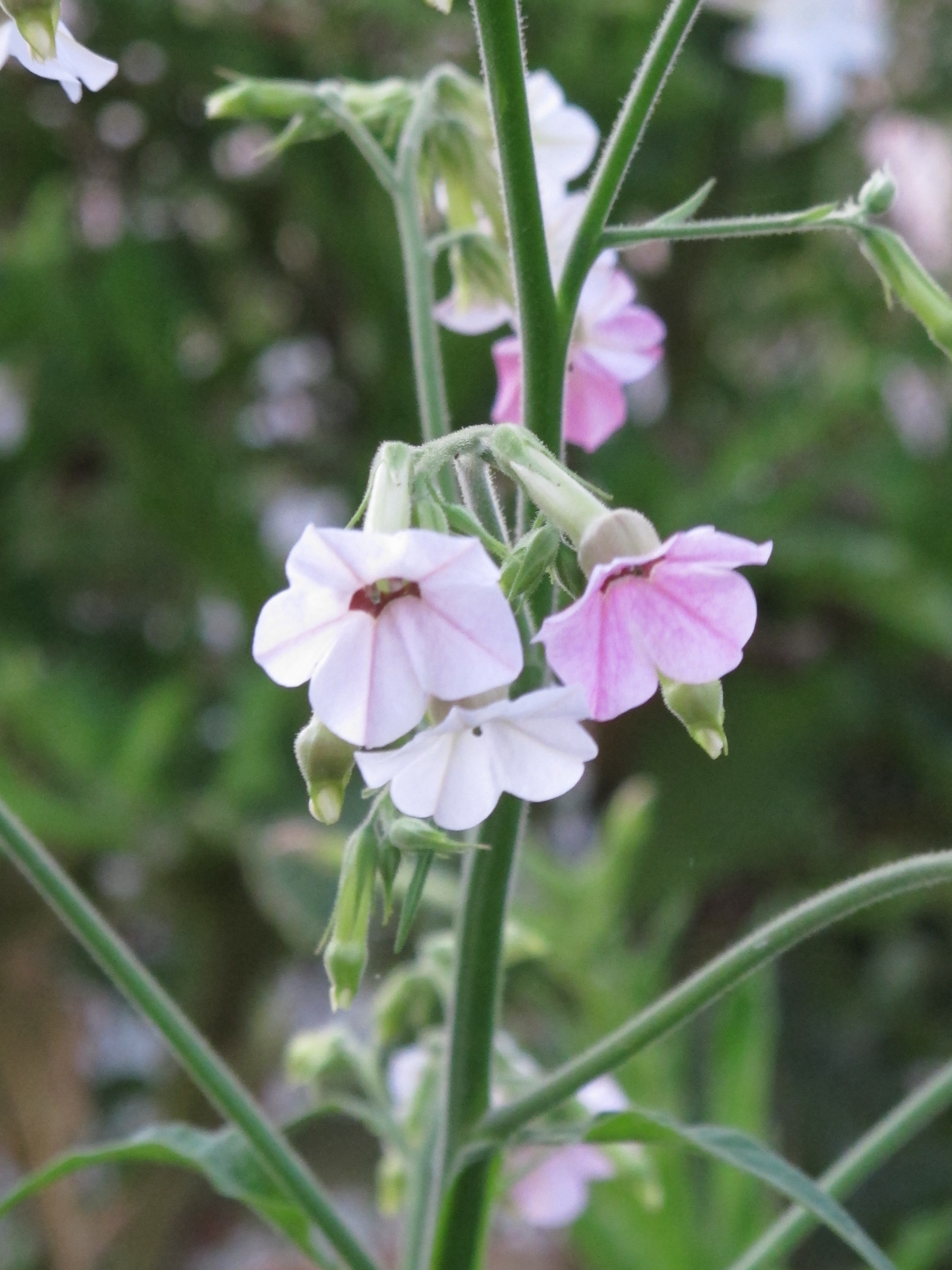
- Flowering in a garden in Miami

Scientific classification
- Kingdom: Plantae
- Clade: Tracheophytes
- Clade: Angiosperms
- Clade: Eudicots
- Clade: Asterids
- Order: Solanales
- Family: Solanaceae
- Genus: Nicotiana
- Species: N. mutabilis

Binomial name
- Nicotiana mutabilis Stehmann & Semir

= Nicotiana mutabilis =

Species of plant

Nicotiana mutabilis, the colour-changing tobacco plant or flowering tobacco plant, is a species of flowering plant in the family Solanaceae. It is native to northeastern Rio Grande do Sul state in Brazil, and it has been introduced to Great Britain. An erect annual or biennial reaching 1.5 m (5 ft), its flowers start out white and fade to pink and finally dark pink. It is available from commercial suppliers.
