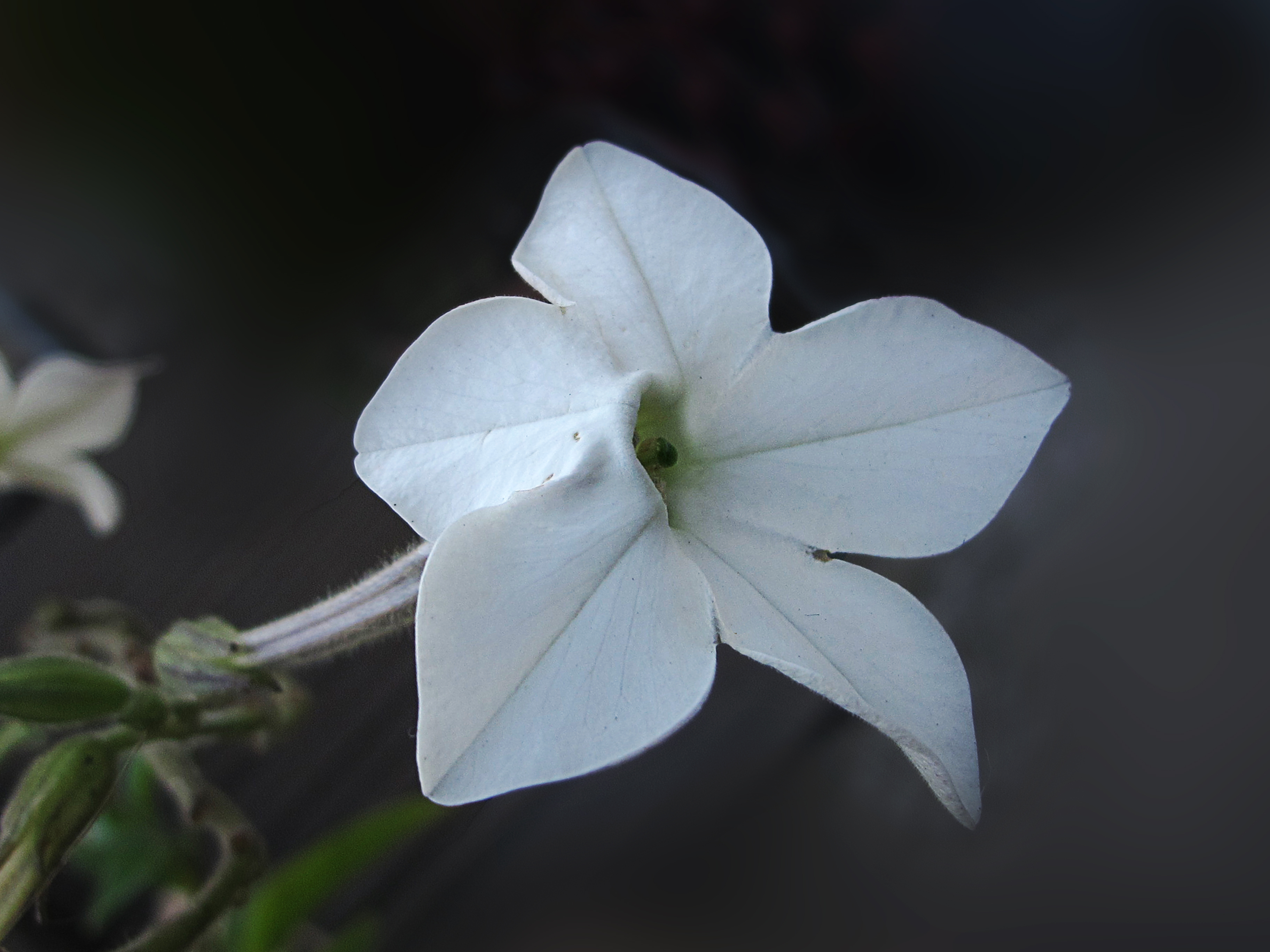

Scientific classification
- Kingdom: Plantae
- Clade: Tracheophytes
- Clade: Angiosperms
- Clade: Eudicots
- Clade: Asterids
- Order: Solanales
- Family: Solanaceae
- Genus: Nicotiana
- Species: N. longiflora

Binomial name
- Nicotiana longiflora Cav.

= Nicotiana longiflora =

Longflower tobacco

Species of tobacco

Nicotiana longiflora, the longflower tobacco or long-flowered tobacco, is a species of tobacco native to South America that is sometimes cultivated for its tubular flowers that emit a very sweet odour at night.

This plant has been a significant source of disease resistance in flue-cured and burley tobacco. Some of the disease impacted by resistance from this species are: black shank, cyst nematode, root-knot nematode, and wildfire. The resistance form N. longiflora imparts near immunity to race 0 black shank, but no resistance to race 1. One of the varieties still in use today is 14 x L8, the second most popular burley tobacco variety in the U.S.
