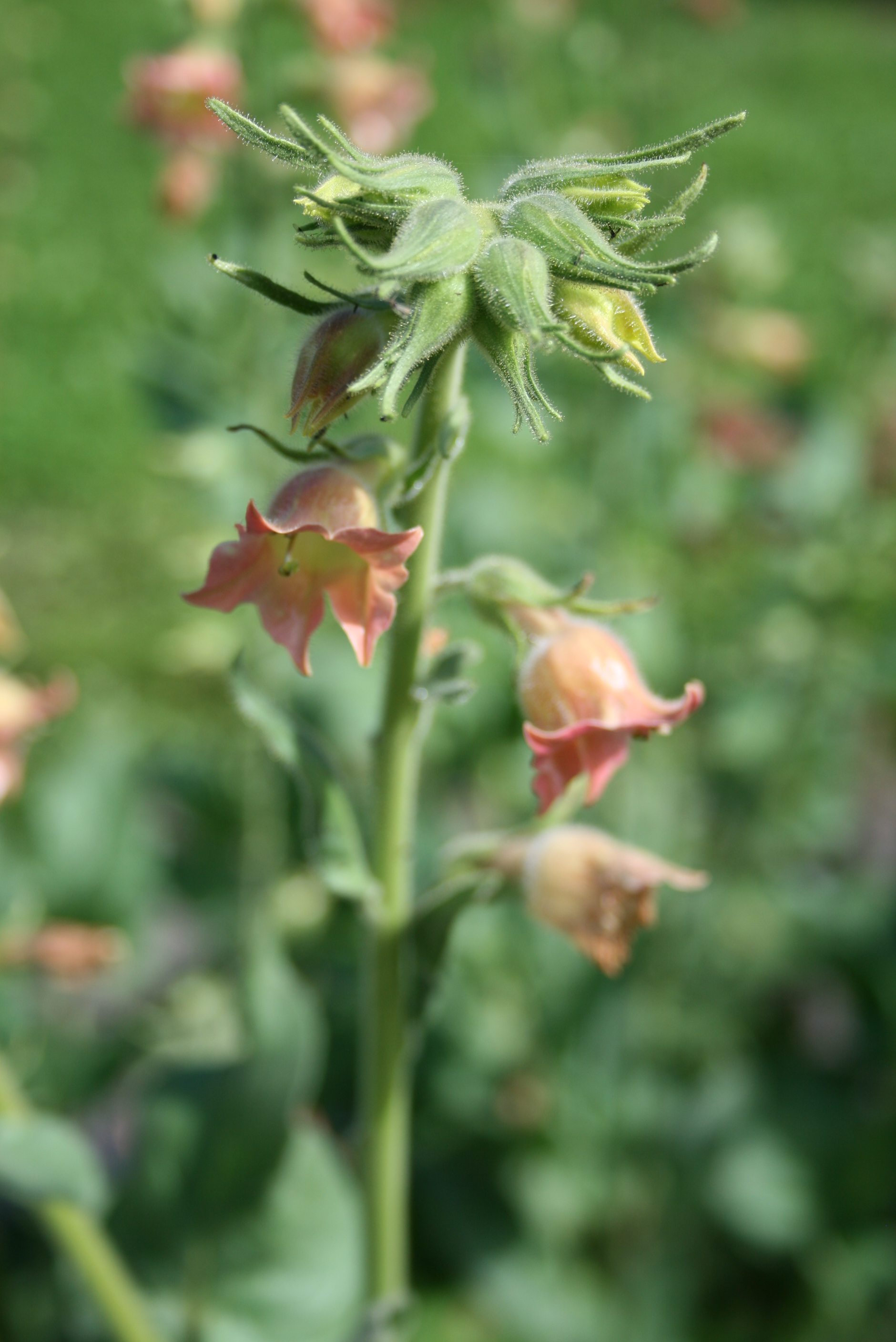

Scientific classification
- Kingdom: Plantae
- Clade: Tracheophytes
- Clade: Angiosperms
- Clade: Eudicots
- Clade: Asterids
- Order: Solanales
- Family: Solanaceae
- Genus: Nicotiana
- Species: N. glutinosa

Binomial name
- Nicotiana glutinosa L.

= Nicotiana glutinosa =

Species of flowering plant

Nicotiana glutinosa is a species of tobacco plant that is economically important in tobacco hybrids. N. glutinosa is native to western South America, including Bolivia, Ecuador, and Peru. It is a model organism for the study of Tobacco mosaic virus resistance in tobacco.

N. glutinosa is a Dicotyledon and is from the family of Solanaceae. The use of N. glutinosa in tobamoviruses allowed for the death of lesions within the plant. They are a C3 photosynthesizing plant and are a photoautotroph. They are hosts to the Ageratum leaf curl virus. This species is eaten by potato tuberworms. Other synonyms of N.glutinosa include Blenocoes longiflora Raf., Nicotiana militaris L., and Tabacus viscidus Moench.
