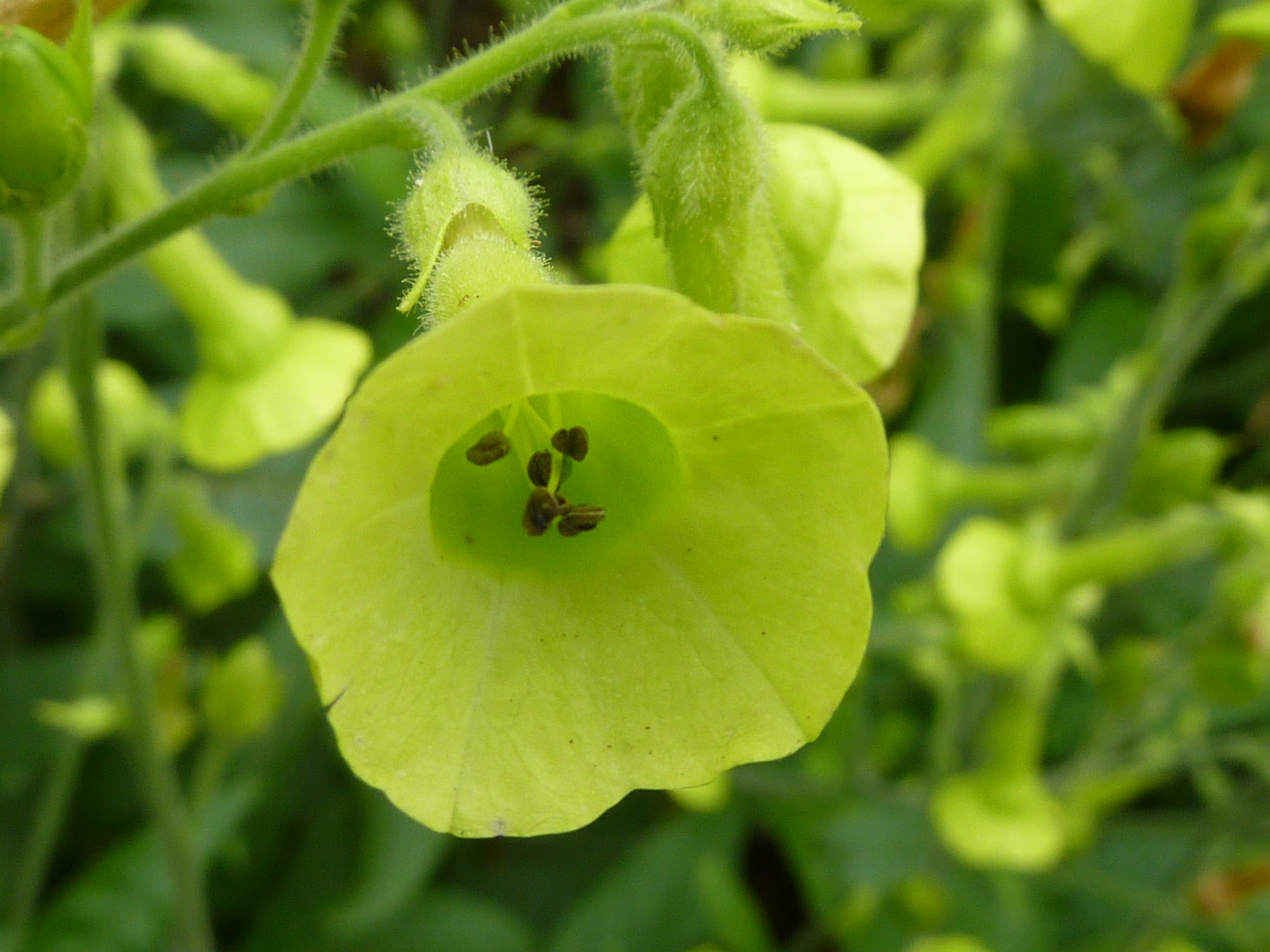

Scientific classification
- Kingdom: Plantae
- Clade: Tracheophytes
- Clade: Angiosperms
- Clade: Eudicots
- Clade: Asterids
- Order: Solanales
- Family: Solanaceae
- Genus: Nicotiana
- Species: N. langsdorffii

Binomial name
- Nicotiana langsdorffii Weinm.

= Nicotiana langsdorffii =

Species of flowering plant

Nicotiana langsdorffii, Langsdorff's tobacco, is a species of flowering plant in the nightshade family Solanaceae, native to Brazil. Growing to 1.5 m (4.9 ft) tall by 0.5 m (1.6 ft) broad, it is an annual plant with large sticky leaves up to 10 in (25 cm) long. It bears 2 in (5.1 cm) long, nodding, tubular bell-shaped flowers that are apple green in colour, with blue anthers. N. langsdorfii lacks fragrance, unlike some of the other tall species. It is grown as an ornamental garden plant.

Like other species in the genus, N. langsdorffii can cause severe discomfort and irritation if consumed.

This plant has gained the Royal Horticultural Society's Award of Garden Merit.

== Etymology ==
The species name langsdorffii is in honour of G. I. Langsdorff, who was the Russian Consul in Rio de Janeiro. Langsdorf was responsible for an expedition to explore the interior of Brazil in the 1820s.
