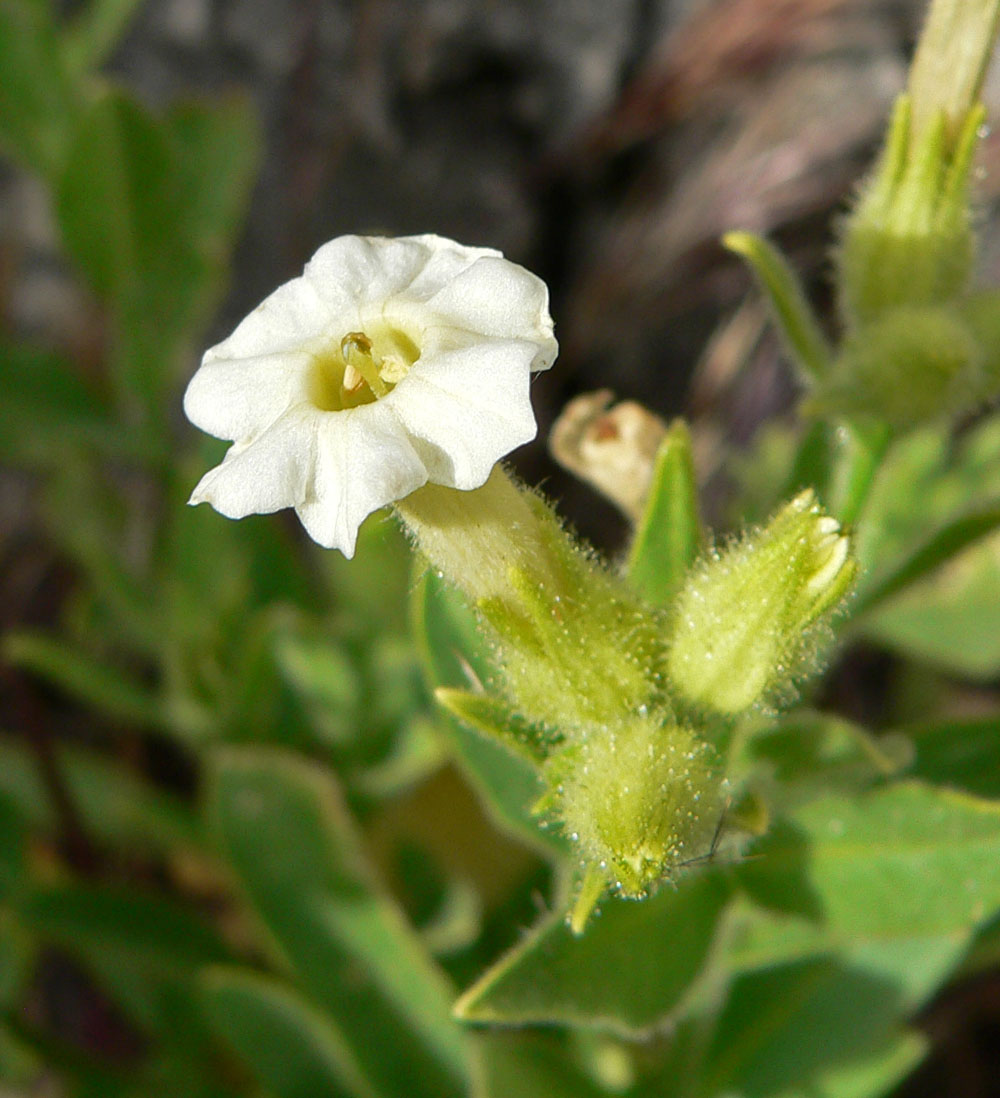

Conservation status
- Apparently Secure (NatureServe)

Scientific classification
- Kingdom: Plantae
- Clade: Tracheophytes
- Clade: Angiosperms
- Clade: Eudicots
- Clade: Asterids
- Order: Solanales
- Family: Solanaceae
- Genus: Nicotiana
- Species: N. obtusifolia

Binomial name
- Nicotiana obtusifolia Martens & Galeotti, 1845

Synonyms
- Heterotypic Synonyms: Nicotiana glandulosa Buckley; Nicotiana ipomopsiflora Dunal; Nicotiana multiflora Torr.; Nicotiana obtusifolia var. palmeri (A.Gray) Kartesz; Nicotiana palmeri A.Gray; Nicotiana sordida Lehm.; Nicotiana trigonophylla Dunal; Nicotiana trigonophylla var. ipomopsiflora (Dunal) Comes; Nicotiana trigonophylla var. palmeri (A.Gray) M.E.Jones; Nicotiana trigonophylla var. pulla Comes; Nicotiana trigonophylla var. sordida (Lehm.) Comes

= Nicotiana obtusifolia =

Species of flowering plant

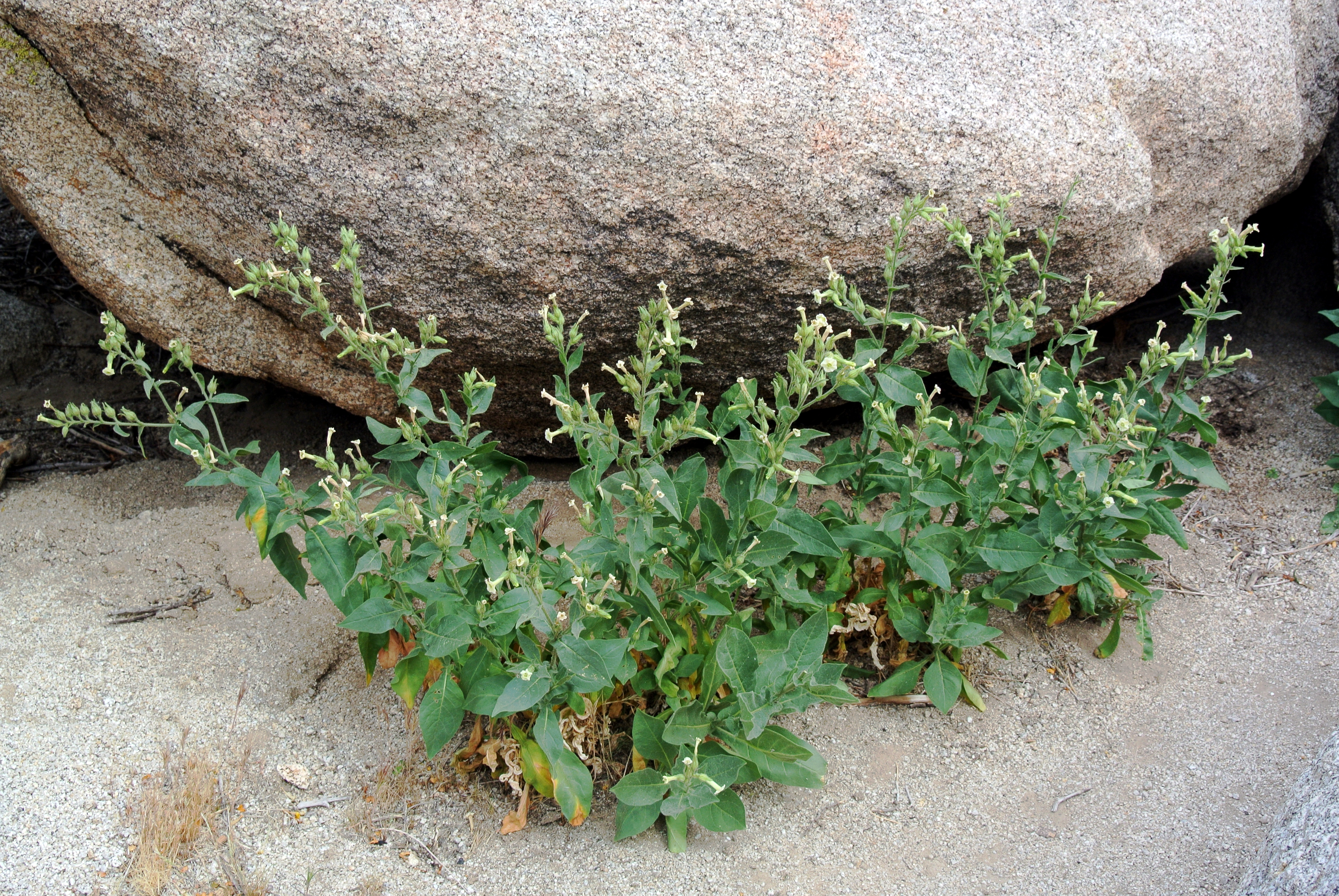
Nicotiana obtusifolia in Anza-Borrego Desert State Park

Nicotiana obtusifolia, or desert tobacco, is a species of flowering plant in the family Solanaceae. It is native to the southwestern United States (from California to Utah to Texas) and Mexico.

It is a woody perennial herb growing up to about 80 centimetres (31 in) in maximum height. The leaves have blades up to 10 centimetres (4 in) long, the lower ones borne on short petioles, the upper ones smaller and clasping the stem. The funnel-shaped flower is white or green-tinged, its tubular throat up to 2.6 centimetres (1 in) long. Its native habitats include sandy areas and washes.
