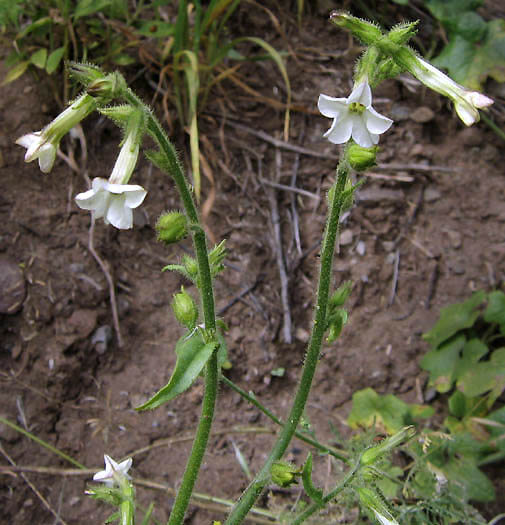

Scientific classification
- Kingdom: Plantae
- Clade: Tracheophytes
- Clade: Angiosperms
- Clade: Eudicots
- Clade: Asterids
- Order: Solanales
- Family: Solanaceae
- Genus: Nicotiana
- Species: N. clevelandii

Binomial name
- Nicotiana clevelandii A.Gray

= Nicotiana clevelandii =

Species of flowering plant

Nicotiana clevelandii is a species of wild tobacco known by the common name Cleveland's tobacco.

Its specific epithet clevelandii honors 19th-century San Diego–based plant collector and lawyer Daniel Cleveland.

It is native to northwestern Mexico and the southwestern United States in California and Arizona, where it grows in the Sonoran Desert, Colorado Desert, and in chaparral of the coastal canyons of the Peninsular Ranges and the Channel Islands of California.

== Description ==
Nicotiana clevelandii is a glandular and sparsely hairy annual herb producing a slender stem up to about 60 centimetres (24 in) in maximum height. The leaf blades may be 18 centimetres (7.1 in) long, the lower ones borne on petioles.

The inflorescence bears white or green-tinged flowers with tubular throats around 2 centimeters long, their bases enclosed in pointed sepals which are unequal in length. The flower face is about a centimeter wide with five mostly white lobes.

The fruit is a capsule about half a centimeter long.

== Uses ==
This plant was used for a variety of medicinal purposes and smoked in rituals by the Cahuilla.
