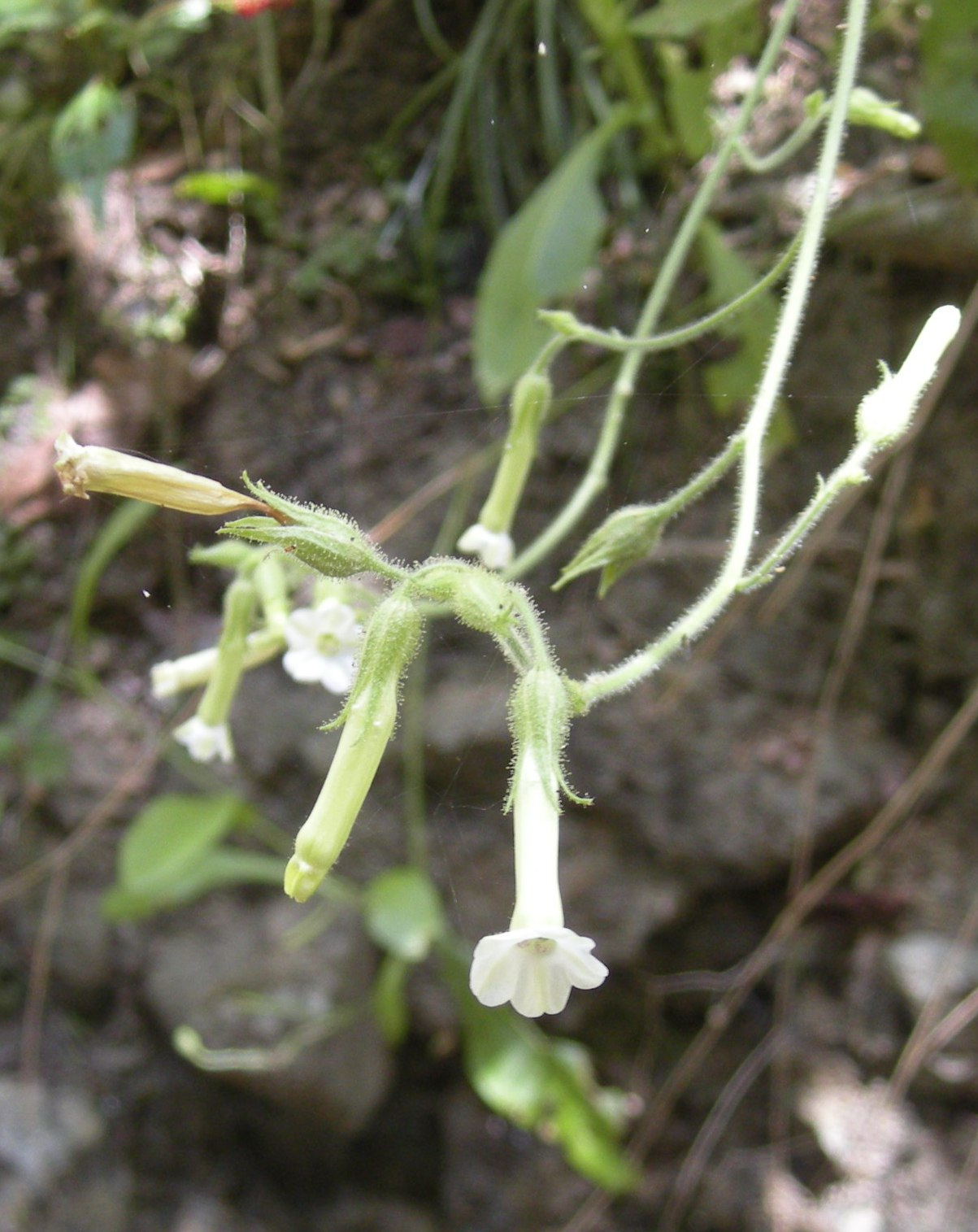
- Close-up of flowers
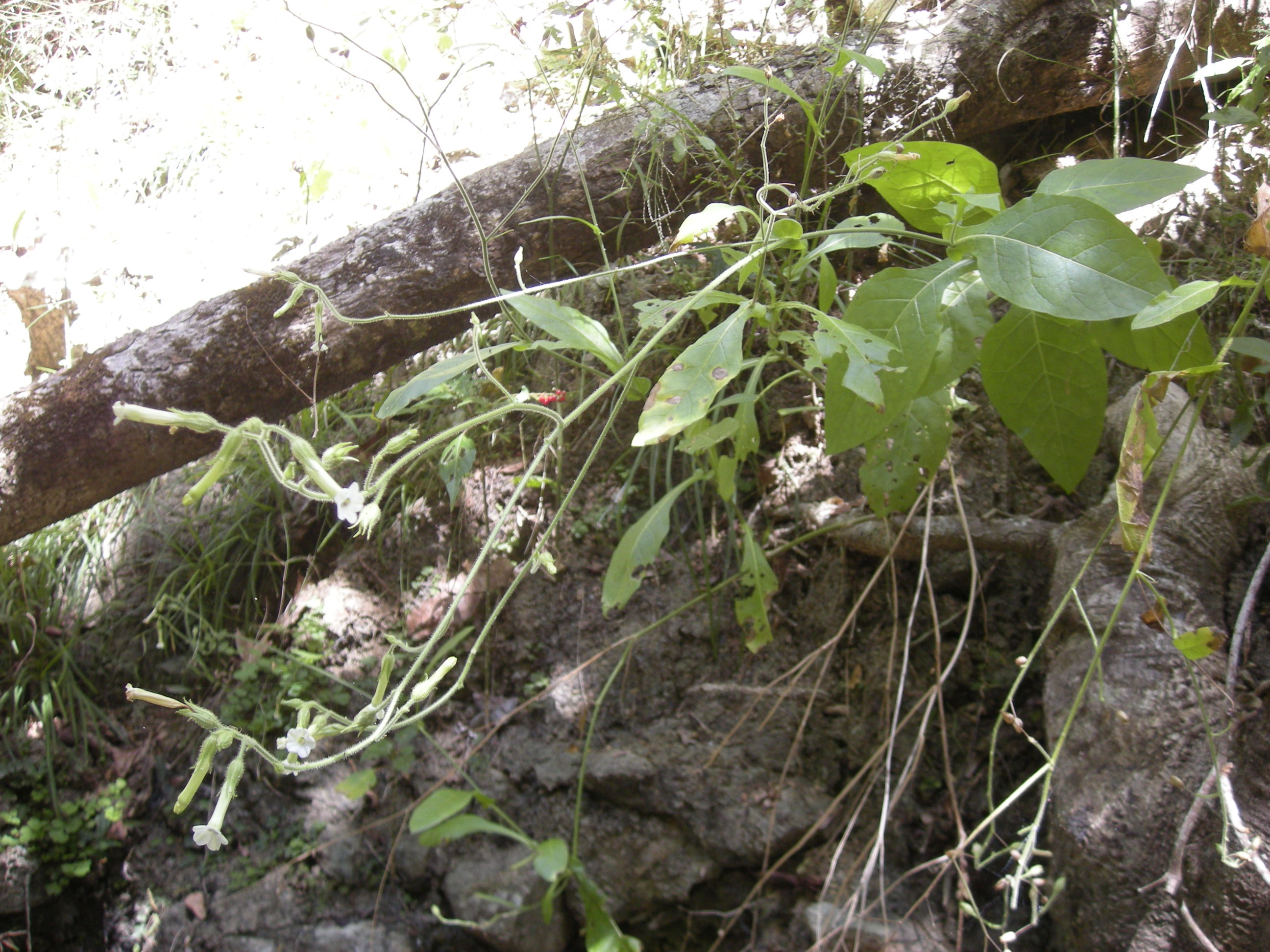
- Habit

Scientific classification
- Kingdom: Plantae
- Clade: Embryophytes
- Clade: Tracheophytes
- Clade: Spermatophytes
- Clade: Angiosperms
- Clade: Eudicots
- Clade: Asterids
- Order: Solanales
- Family: Solanaceae
- Genus: Nicotiana
- Species: N. forsteri

Binomial name
- Nicotiana forsteri Roem. & Schult.

Synonyms
- Nicotiana australis R.Br. ex Domin; Nicotiana debneyi Domin; Nicotiana fruticosa G.Forst.; Nicotiana suaveolens var. debneyi F.M.Bailey; Nicotiana suaveolens var. parviflora Benth.

= Nicotiana forsteri =

Species of plant in the nightshade family

Nicotiana forsteri (syn. Nicotiana debneyi) is a species of wild tobacco in the family Solanaceae, native to Queensland, New South Wales, Lord Howe Island (all part of Australia) and New Caledonia. It is a tetraploid.
