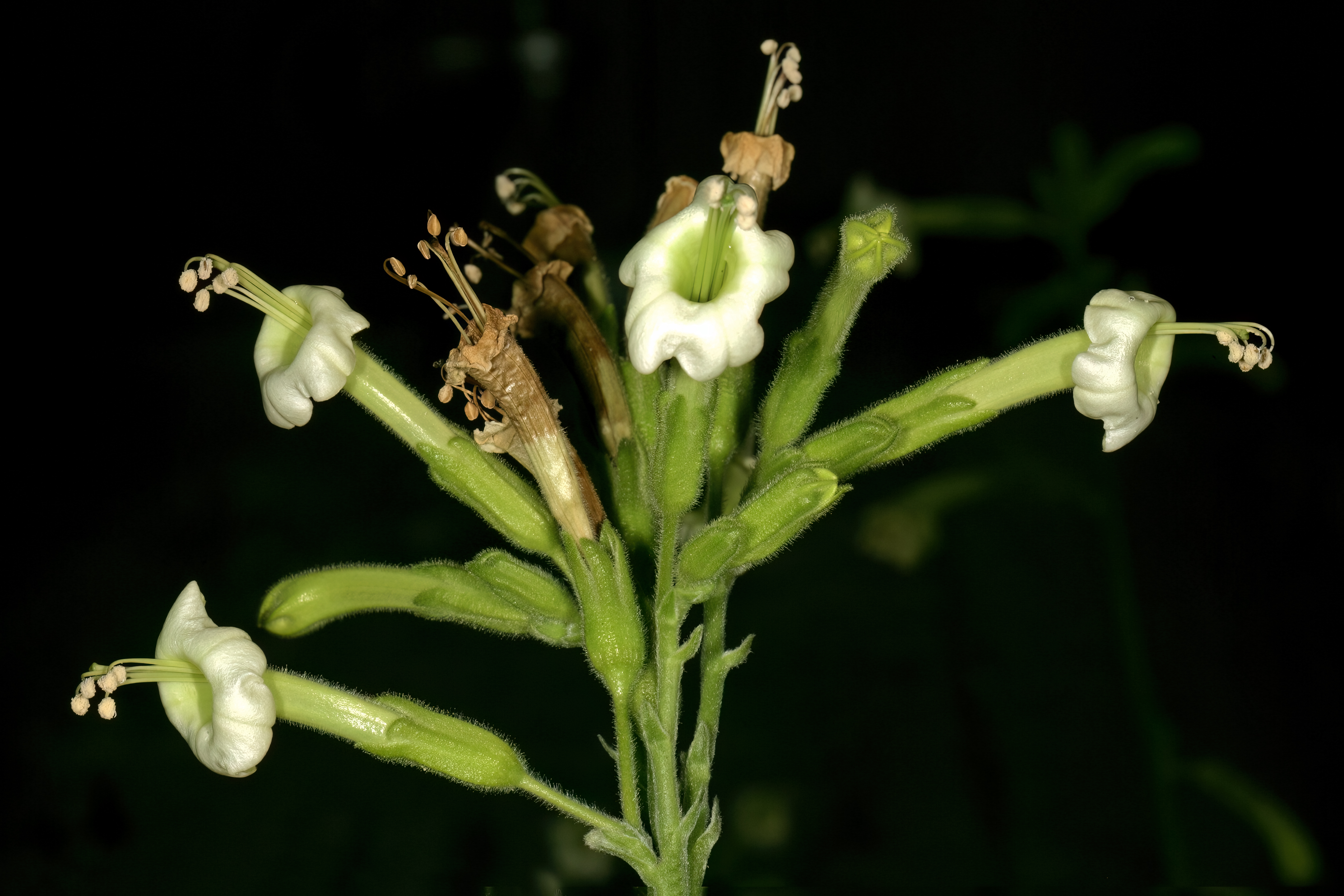

Conservation status
- Least Concern (IUCN 3.1)

Scientific classification
- Kingdom: Plantae
- Clade: Tracheophytes
- Clade: Angiosperms
- Clade: Eudicots
- Clade: Asterids
- Order: Solanales
- Family: Solanaceae
- Genus: Nicotiana
- Species: N. africana

Binomial name
- Nicotiana africana Merxm.

= Nicotiana africana =

Species of flowering plant

Nicotiana africana is a species of plant in the family Solanaceae. It is endemic to Namibia. Its natural habitats are subtropical or tropical dry shrubland and rocky areas.
