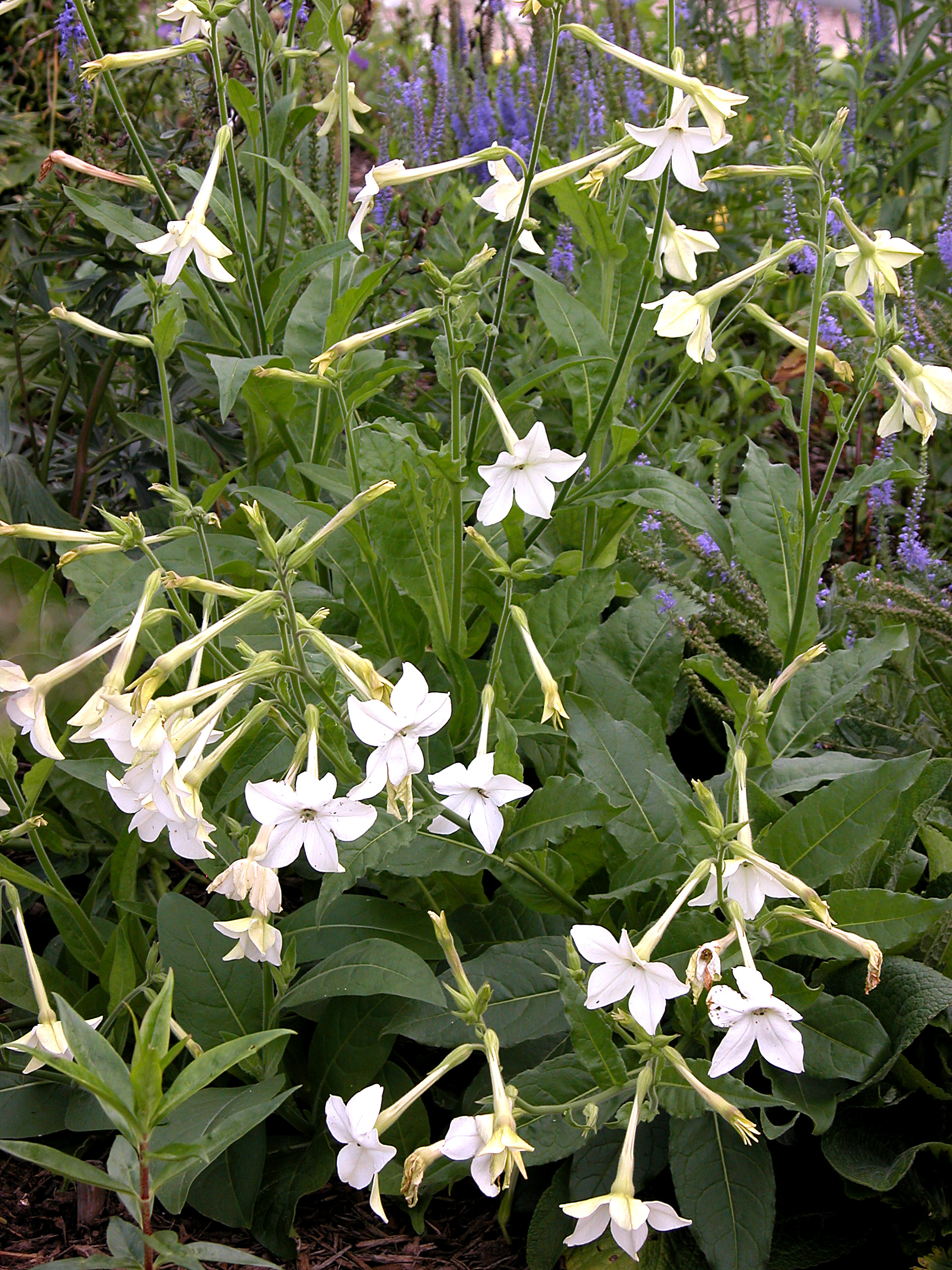
- Ornamental N. alata

Scientific classification
- Kingdom: Plantae
- Clade: Tracheophytes
- Clade: Angiosperms
- Clade: Eudicots
- Clade: Asterids
- Order: Solanales
- Family: Solanaceae
- Genus: Nicotiana
- Species: N. alata

Binomial name
- Nicotiana alata Link & Otto

Synonyms
- Nicotiana acutifolia Burb.; Nicotiana affinis T.Moore; Nicotiana decurrens C.Agardh; Nicotiana persica Lindl.; Nicotiana pseudodecurrens Steud.

= Nicotiana alata =

Species of flowering plant

Nicotiana alata is a species of tobacco. It is called jasmine tobacco, sweet tobacco, winged tobacco, tanbaku, and Persian tobacco.

Nictoiana alata is mainly grown as an ornamental plant; numerous cultivars and hybrids are derived from it. In Iran, narghila tobacco is sometimes produced from N. alata; it is not chopped like cigarette tobacco, but broken up by hand.

== Description ==
The flowering period of Nicotina alata in the northern hemisphere ranges from summer through fall. The flowers of common varieties open during the late afternoon or evening and release a distinct, floral scent throughout the night. The commonly cultivated varieties may have flowers in white, yellow, pink, crimson, lime green or maroon red.

Pollination of plants in the genus Nicotina is mainly carried out by nocturnal species of moths.

The plant usually grows 30 to 60 cm tall, individual plants should be spaced apart by 30 to 40 cm. They grow best in full sun to partial shade, in moist soil, given that Nicotina alata is not drought-tolerant.

== Cultivation ==
Seedlings do best when gradually introduced to outdoor environment over the course of a week. Plants tend to self-sow. (Color may be the original or occasionally several colors on one plant). Deadhead spent flower stalks for best blooming results.
