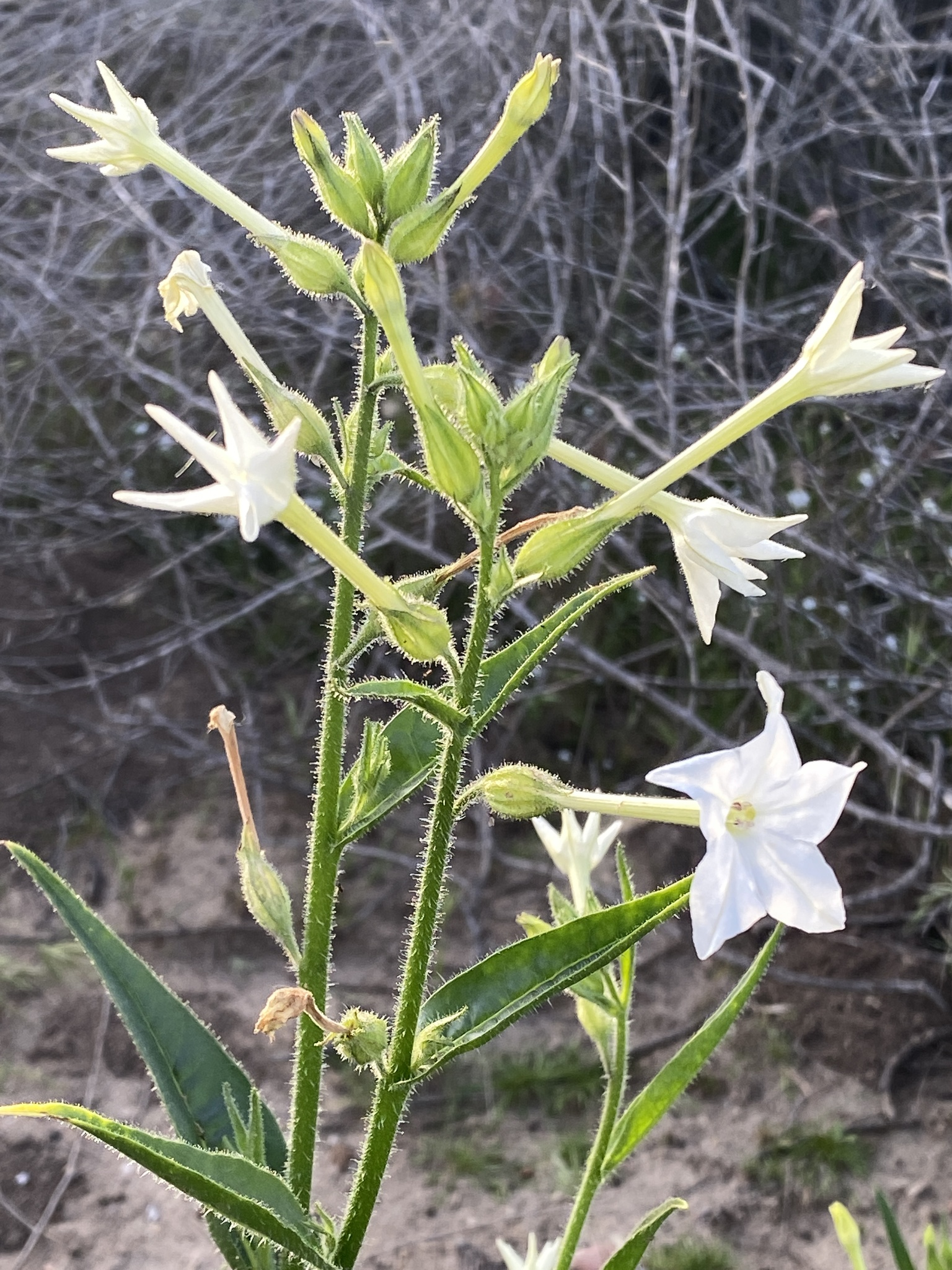

Scientific classification
- Kingdom: Plantae
- Clade: Tracheophytes
- Clade: Angiosperms
- Clade: Eudicots
- Clade: Asterids
- Order: Solanales
- Family: Solanaceae
- Genus: Nicotiana
- Species: N. quadrivalvis

Binomial name
- Nicotiana quadrivalvis Pursh

Synonyms
- Nicotiana bigelovii

= Nicotiana quadrivalvis =

Species of flowering plant

Nicotiana quadrivalvis is a species of wild tobacco known as Indian tobacco. The variety N. quadrivalvis var. multivalvis is known by the common name Columbian tobacco. It is endemic to the western United States, where it grows in many types of habitat. It is a bushy, sprawling annual herb growing up to two meters in maximum height. The lower leaf blades are up to 15 centimetres (6 in) long and are borne on short petioles, the upper smaller and sessile on the stem. The inflorescence is an array of several white, greenish, or purple-tinged flowers with tubular throats up to 5 centimeters long. The base of each is enclosed in a ridged calyx of sepals. The flower face may be 5 centimetres (2 in) wide. The fruit is a capsule up to 2 centimetres (3/4 in) in length.

It is also called "sacred tobacco," by different Native American cultures. Nicotiana rustica can also be considered sacred.

== Cultivation ==
Nicotiana quadrivalvis has traditionally been cultivated by indigenous peoples living on the west coast of the United States, primarily in particular southern Oregon and northern California, and along the middle Columbia River. Individually owned plots of tobacco plants were seeded with the previous year's seed capsules, tilled and weeded and fertilized in the fall by mixing in rotten wood after the harvest. The species was first described from the upper Missouri River where it was cultivated by the Mandan and Arikara.

Further north, the Haida, Tlingit, and probably Tsimshian cultivate a related variety of tobacco long thought to have gone extinct, Nicotiana quadrivalvis var. multivalvis, in a similar manner. The original seeds must have been acquired from afar, as tobacco was not native to the northern Northwest Coast. Myths reflecting this describe the supernatural original acquisition of the seeds.

Seeds of var. multivalvis were brought to London by botanist David Douglas, having stolen them at night in 1825. The seeds found themselves in a seed bank in Puławy, Poland where they were returned to the Confederated Tribes of Coos, Lower Umpqua and Siuslaw Indians.
