= Thomas Harper Goodspeed =

American botanist specializing in Nicotiana genetics (1887–1966)

- Born: May 17, 1887; Hartford, Connecticut
- Died: May 17, 1966 (aged 79); Calistoga, California
- Occupation: Botanist
- Children: Stephen Spencer Goodspeed and Ellen Spencer (Goodspeed) Ainsworth
- Parent(s): George S. Goodspeed and Florence Duffy (Mills) Goodspeed

Thomas Harper Goodspeed (17 May 1887 Hartford, Connecticut - 17 May 1966 Calistoga California) was a botanist specializing in the genetics of species Nicotiana. He was the director of the University of California Botanical Garden from 1919 to 1957. Under the direction of Goodspeed and University of California landscape architect, John William Gregg, the garden was moved from its location on the central campus to its current site in Strawberry Canyon in the hills above the campus.

Among his doctoral advisees was the plant anatomist Katherine Esau.

As director of the UCBG, Goodspeed led several plant hunting expeditions to the Andes of Colombia, Peru, Chile, Argentina, and Uruguay. He obtained a substantial collection of Nicotiana during these expeditions, which were then assembled at the Botanical Garden for further study. His study lead to increased understanding of the origins and diversity of tobacco species. The collection was later used to reintroduce wild disease resistance traits into domesticated species.

During World War I Goodspeed, along with desert rubber expert and fellow Berkeley botanist, Harvey Monroe Hall, worked for the United States' Western strategic plants surveys for native sources of rubber. His positive relations with South American countries lead to him being asked to help maintain relations with these countries during World War II.

He spent some time in Chile helping to design the Chilean Botanical Garden.

The Australian tobacco species Nicotiana goodspeedii H.-M. Wheeler is named after Goodspeed.
