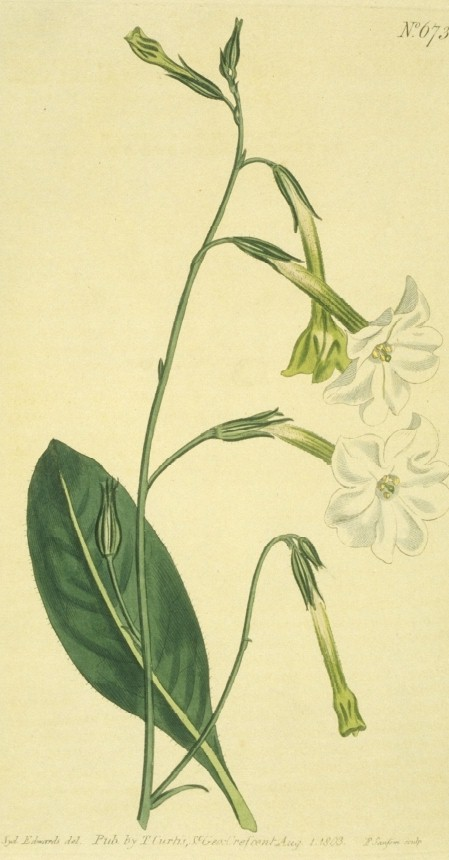

Scientific classification
- Kingdom: Plantae
- Clade: Tracheophytes
- Clade: Angiosperms
- Clade: Eudicots
- Clade: Asterids
- Order: Solanales
- Family: Solanaceae
- Genus: Nicotiana
- Species: N. suaveolens

Binomial name
- Nicotiana suaveolens Lehm.

Synonyms
- Nicotiana australasiae R.Br.; Nicotiana suaveolens var. undulata Comes; Nicotiana undulata Vent.; Nicotiana anisandra Vest; Nicotiana odorata T.Moore & Mast.; Nicotiana suaveolens var. anisandra (Vest) Comes; Nicotiana suaveolens var. vinciflora (Link) Comes; Nicotiana vinciflora Link

= Nicotiana suaveolens =

Australian tobacco

Species of flowering plant

Nicotiana suaveolens is a species of flowering plant in the family Solanaceae. It is sometimes referred to by the common name Australian tobacco, and is a herb reaching 1.5 meters in height. It is native to New South Wales and Victoria.
