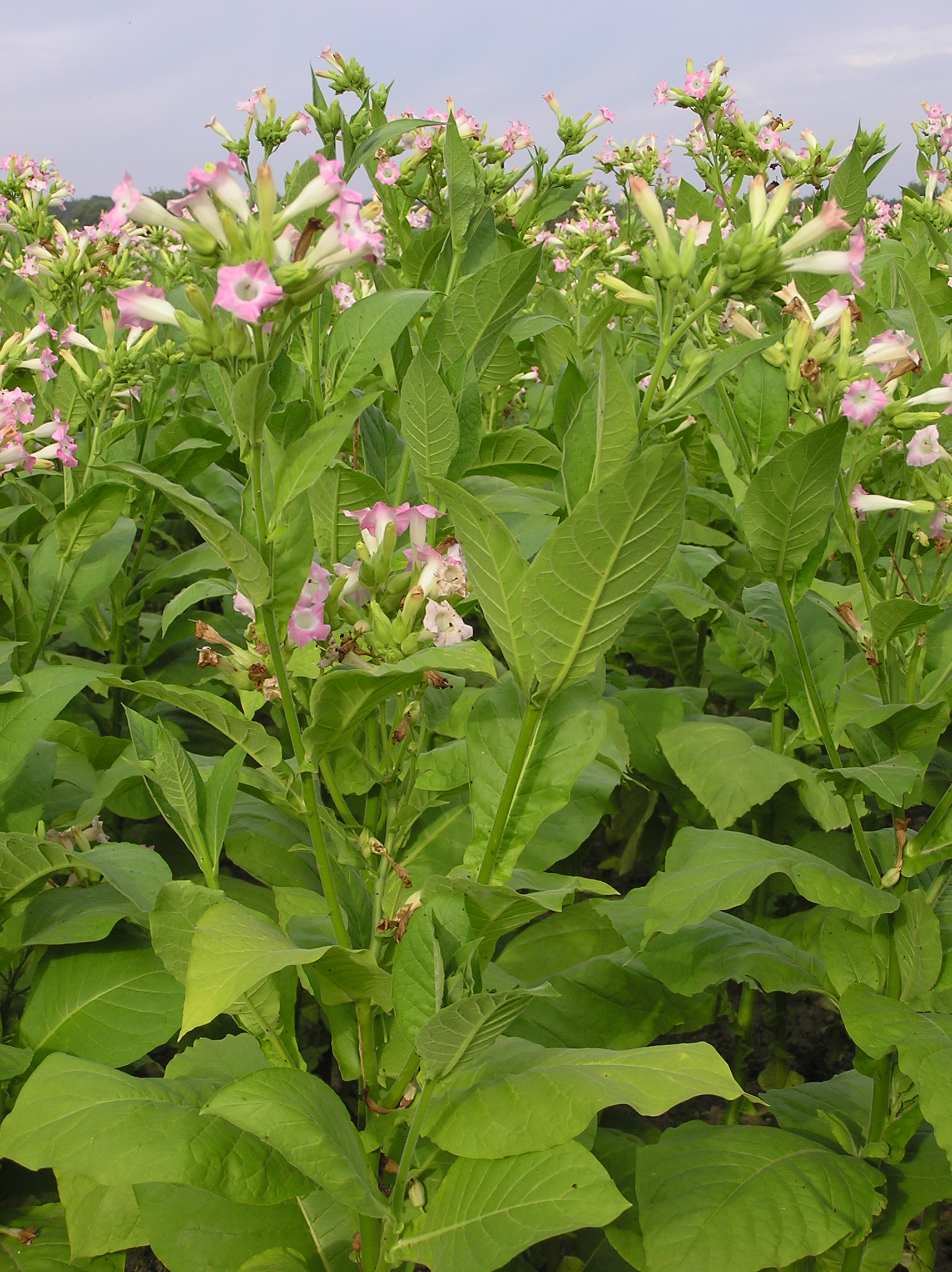
- Nicotiana tabacum

Scientific classification
- Kingdom: Plantae
- Clade: Tracheophytes
- Clade: Angiosperms
- Clade: Eudicots
- Clade: Asterids
- Order: Solanales
- Family: Solanaceae
- Tribe: Nicotianeae
- Genus: Nicotiana; L.

Type species
- Nicotiana tabacum L.

Species
- See text

Synonyms
- Amphipleis Raf.; Blenocoes Raf.; Dittostigma Phil.; Eucapnia Raf.; Langsdorfia Raf.; Lehmannia Spreng.; Merinthe Salisb.; Nicotia Opiz; Nicotidendron Griseb.; Perieteris Raf.; Polydiclis Miers; Sairanthus G.Don; Siphaulax Raf.; Tabacum Gilib.; Tabacus Moench; Waddingtonia Phil.

= Nicotiana =

Genus of flowering plants in the nightshade family Solanaceae

Nicotiana (/ˌnɪkoʊʃiˈeɪnə, nɪˌkoʊ-, -kɒti-, -ˈɑːnə, -ˈænə/) is a genus of herbaceous plants and shrubs in the family Solanaceae that is indigenous to the Americas, Australia, Southwestern Africa and the South Pacific. Various Nicotiana species, commonly referred to as tobacco plants, are cultivated by humans.

N. tabacum is grown worldwide for the cultivation of tobacco leaves that are used for manufacturing and producing tobacco products, including cigars, cigarillos, cigarettes, chewing tobacco, dipping tobacco, snuff, snus, etc.

== Taxonomy ==
=== Species ===
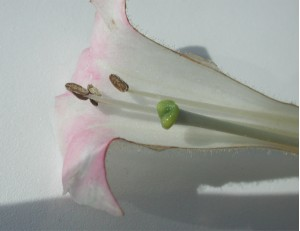
Cross section of Nicotiana tabacum corolla, showing pistil and stamens

The 79 accepted and known species include:

- Nicotiana acuminata (Graham) Hook. – manyflower tobacco or many-flowered tobacco
- Nicotiana africana Merxm.
- Nicotiana alata Link & Otto – jasmine tobacco, sweet tobacco, winged tobacco, Persian tobacco, tanbaku (in Persian)
- Nicotiana attenuata Torrey ex S. Watson – coyote tobacco
- Nicotiana benthamiana Domin – benth, benthi
- Nicotiana bilybara M.W.Chase & Christenh.
- Nicotiana candelabra M.W.Chase & Christenh.
- Nicotiana clarksonii M.W.Chase & Christenh.
- Nicotiana clevelandii A. Gray – Cleveland's tobacco
- Nicotiana erytheia M.W.Chase & Christenh.
- Nicotiana gascoynica M.W.Chase & Christenh.
- Nicotiana glauca Graham – tree tobacco, Brazilian tree tobacco, shrub tobacco, wild tobacco, tobacco plant, tobacco bush, tobacco tree, mustard tree
- Nicotiana glutinosa L.
- Nicotiana hoskingii M.W.Chase, Palsson & Christenh.
- Nicotiana insecticida M.W.Chase & Christenh.
- Nicotiana karara M.W.Chase & Christenh.
- Nicotiana karijini M.W.Chase & Christenh.
- Nicotiana langsdorffii Weinm. – Langsdorff's tobacco
- Nicotiana latifolia M.W.Chase & Christenh.
- Nicotiana latzii M.W.Chase & Christenh.
- Nicotiana longiflora Cav. – longflower tobacco or long-flowered tobacco
- Nicotiana murchisonica M.W.Chase & Christenh.
- Nicotiana mutabilis Stehmann & Semir – color-changing tobacco, flowering tobacco
- Nicotiana notha M.W.Chase & Christenh.
- Nicotiana occidentalis H.-M. Wheeler – native tobacco
- Nicotiana obtusifolia M. Martens & Galeotti – desert tobacco, punche, "tabaquillo"
- Nicotiana olens M.W.Chase & Christenh.
- Nicotiana otophora Griseb.
- Nicotiana pila M.W.Chase & Christenh.
- Nicotiana plumbaginifolia Viv. – Tex-Mex tobacco
- Nicotiana quadrivalvis Pursh – Indian tobacco
- Nicotiana rupestris M.W.Chase & Christenh.
- Nicotiana rustica L. – Aztec tobacco, strong tobacco, mapacho
- Nicotiana salina M.W.Chase & Christenh.
- Nicotiana scopulorum M.W.Chase & Christenh.
- Nicotiana suaveolens Lehm. – Australian tobacco
- Nicotiana sylvestris Speg. & Comes – woodland tobacco, flowering tobacco, South American tobacco
- Nicotiana tabacum L. – common tobacco, domesticated tobacco, cultivated tobacco, commercial tobacco (grown for the production of cigars, cigarillos, cigarettes, chewing tobacco, dipping tobacco, snuff, snus, etc.)
- Nicotiana tomentosiformis Goodsp.
- Nicotiana walpa M.W.Chase, Dodsworth & Christenh.
- Nicotiana yandinga M.W.Chase & Christenh.

=== Manmade hybrids ===
- Nicotiana × didepta – N. forsteri × N. tabacum
- Nicotiana × digluta – N. glutinosa × N. tabacum
- Nicotiana × sanderae Hort. ex Wats. – N. alata × N. forgetiana

=== Formerly placed here ===
- Petunia axillaris (Lam.) Britton et al. (as N. axillaris Lam.) – large white petunia, wild white petunia, white moon petunia

== Etymology ==
The genus Nicotiana (from which the word nicotine is derived) was named in honor of Jean Nicot, French ambassador to Portugal, who in 1559 sent samples as a medicine to the court of Catherine de' Medici.

== Ecology ==
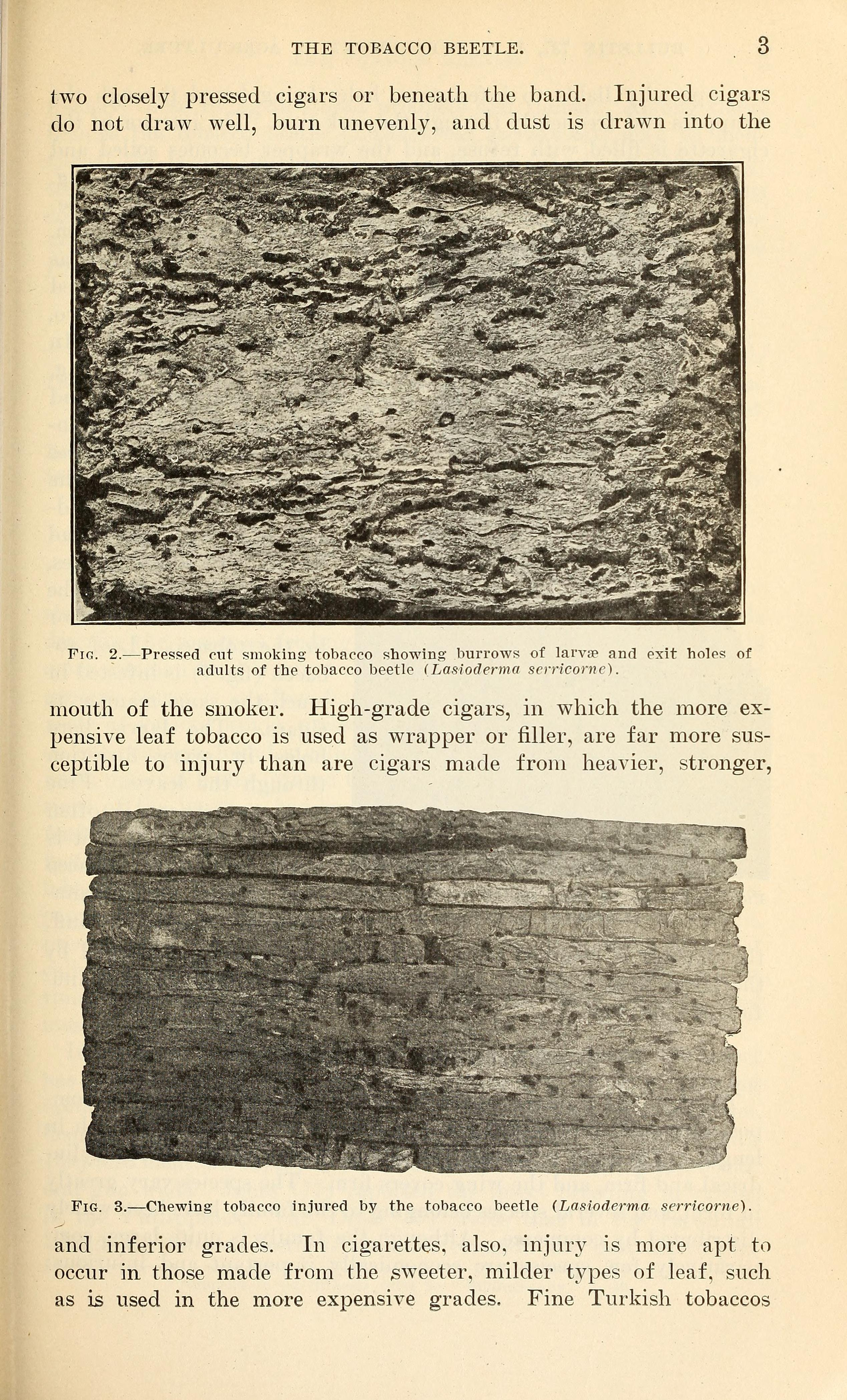
Illustration with photographs of tobacco leaves infested by tobacco beetles (Lasioderma serricorne) from Runner, G. A., The tobacco beetle (1919), Bulletin of the U.S. Department of Agriculture, the Biodiversity Heritage Library

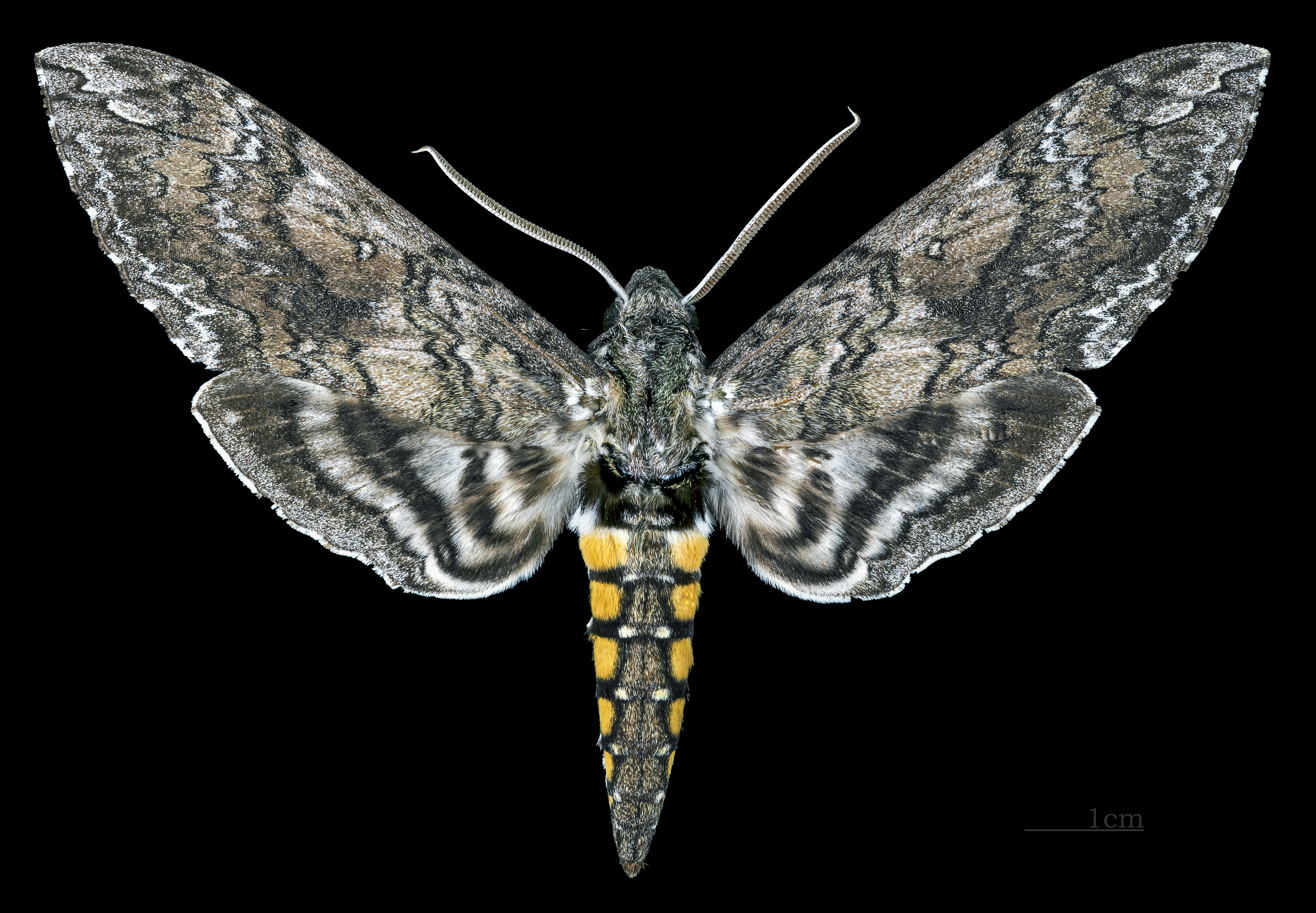
A female specimen of the tobacco hawkmoth (Manduca sexta)

Despite containing enough nicotine and/or other compounds such as germacrene and anabasine and other pyridine alkaloids (varying between species) to deter most herbivores, a number of such animals have evolved the ability to feed on Nicotiana species without being harmed.

Some species (e.g. tree tobacco (N. glauca)) have become established as invasive species in some places.

In the 19th century, young tobacco plantings came under increasing attack from flea beetles (particularly the potato flea beetle (Epitrix cucumeris) and/or Epitrix pubescens), causing the destruction of half the United States tobacco crop in 1876. In the years afterward, many experiments were attempted and discussed to control the potato flea beetle. By 1880, it was discovered that covering young plants with a frame covered with thin fabric (instead of with branches, as had previously been used for frost control) would effectively protect the plants from the beetle. This practice spread until it became ubiquitous in the 1890s.

Tobacco, alongside its related products, can be infested by parasites such as the tobacco beetle (Lasioderma serricorne) and the tobacco moth (Ephestia elutella), which are the most widespread and damaging pests in the tobacco industry. Infestation can range from the tobacco cultivated in the fields to the leaves used for manufacturing cigars, cigarillos, cigarettes, chewing tobacco, dipping tobacco, snuff, snus, etc. Both the grubs of Lasioderma serricorne and the caterpillars of Ephestia elutella are considered major pests.

Other moths whose caterpillars feed on Nicotiana include:

- Black cutworm, greasy cutworm, or floodplain cutworm (as a caterpillar), dark sword-grass or ipsilon dart (as a moth) (Agrotis ipsilon)
- Turnip moth (Agrotis segetum)
- Mouse moth (Amphipyra tragopoginis)
- Clover cutworm (as a caterpillar), nutmeg (as a moth) (Hadula trifolii or Anarta trifolii)
- Endoclita excrescens
- Hawaiian tobacco hornworm or Hawaiian tomato hornworm (as a caterpillar), Blackburn's sphinx moth (as a moth) (Manduca blackburni)
- Tobacco hornworm or Goliath worm (as a caterpillar), tobacco hawkmoth or Carolina sphinx moth (as a moth) (Manduca sexta)
- Tomato hornworm (as a caterpillar), five-spotted hawkmoth (as a moth) (Manduca quinquemaculata)
- Cabbage moth (Mamestra brassicae)
- Angle shades (Phlogophora meticulosa)
- Setaceous Hebrew character (Xestia c-nigrum)
- Cabbage looper (Trichoplusia ni)
- Fall armyworm (Spodoptera frugiperda)
- Tobacco spitworm (as a caterpillar), potato tuber moth (as a moth) (Phthorimaea operculella)
- South American tomato pinworm, tomato pinworm or tomato leafminer (as a caterpillar), South American tomato moth (as a moth) (Tuta absoluta)
- Eggplant leafroller moth or nightshade leaftier (Lineodes integra)
- Eggplant webworm moth (Rhectocraspeda periusalis)

These are mainly Noctuidae, but they also comprise Sphingidae, Gelechiidae, and Crambidae.

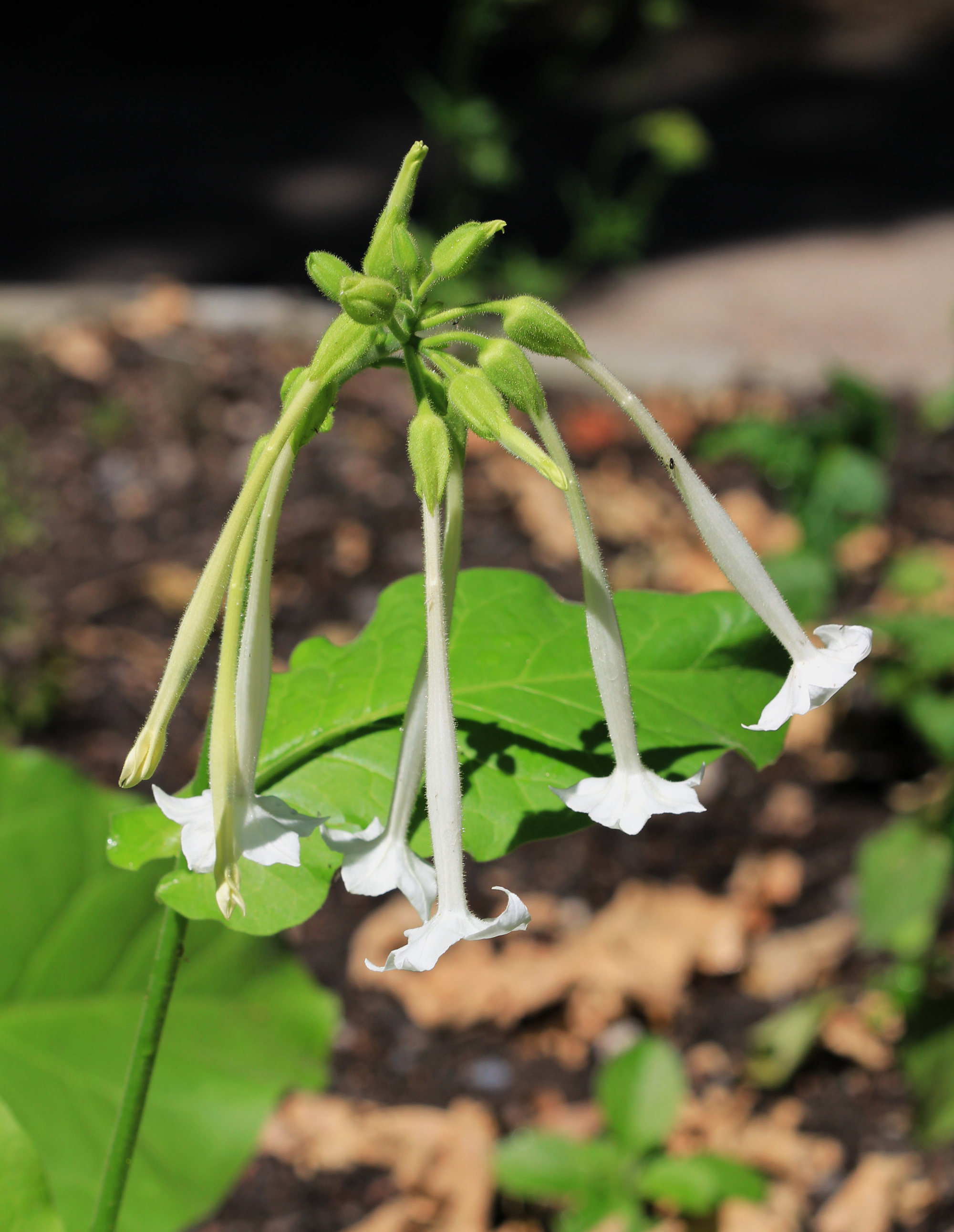
Nicotiana sylvestris

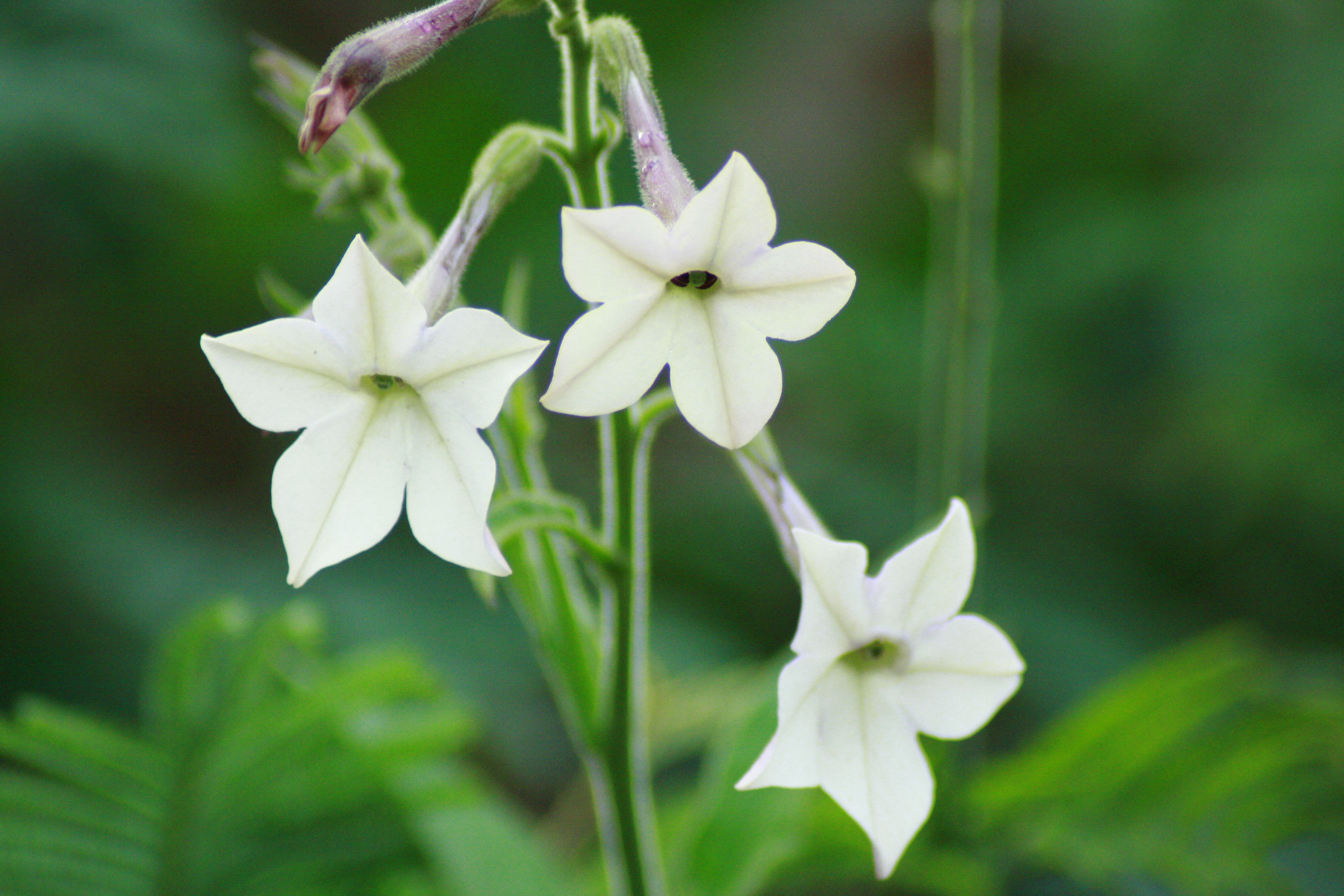
Nicotiana alata

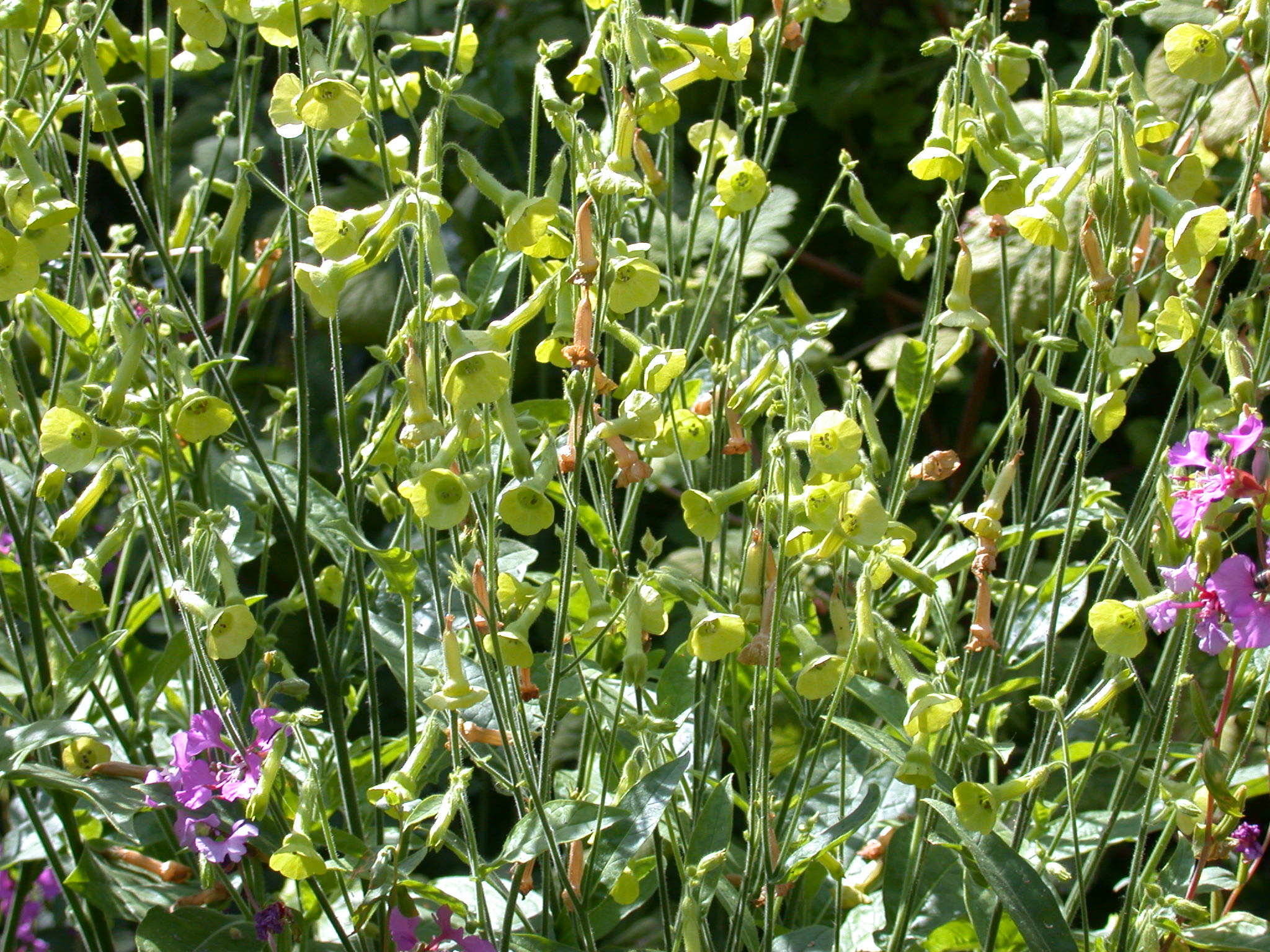
Nicotiana langsdorffii

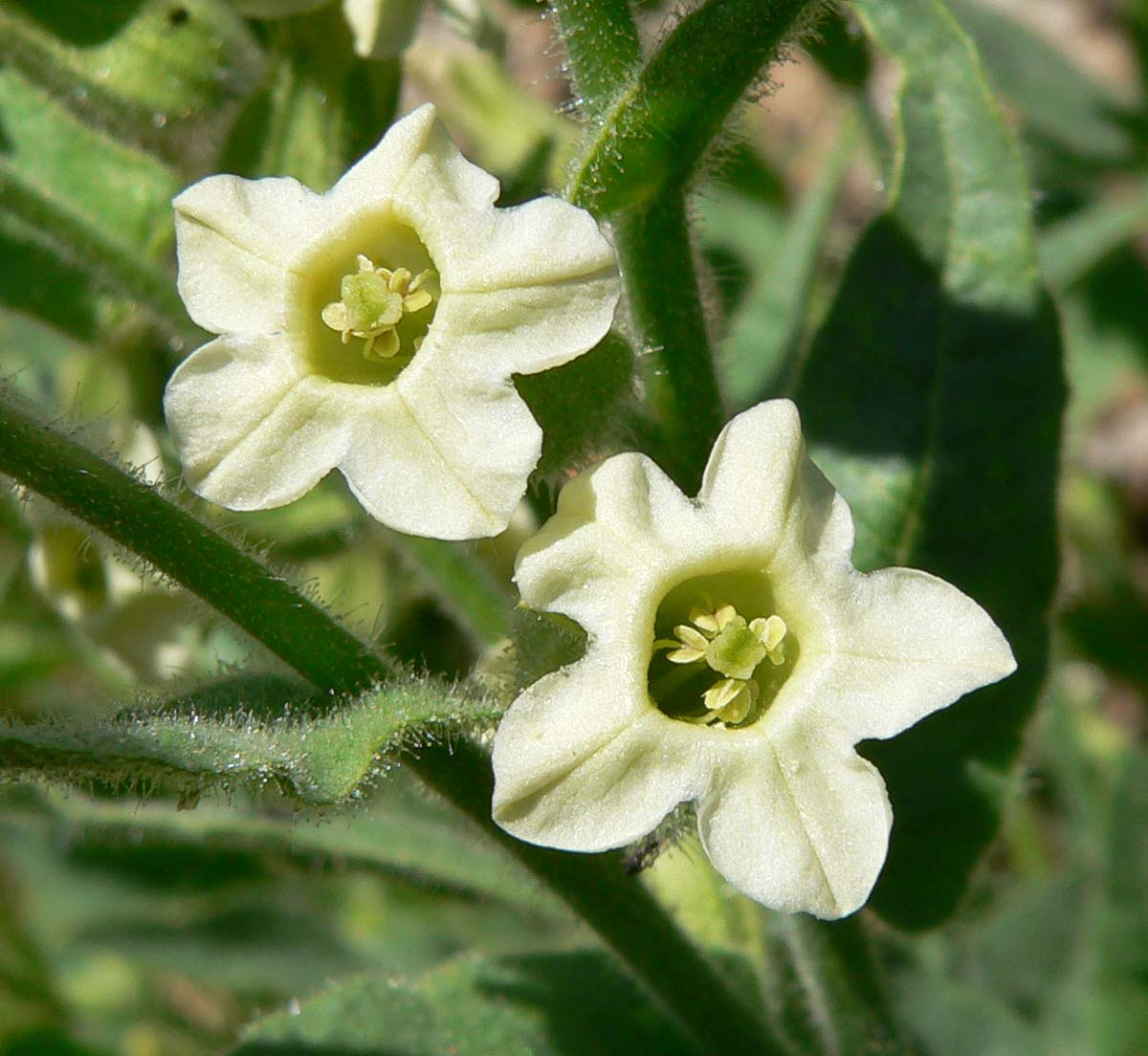
Nicotiana obtusifolia

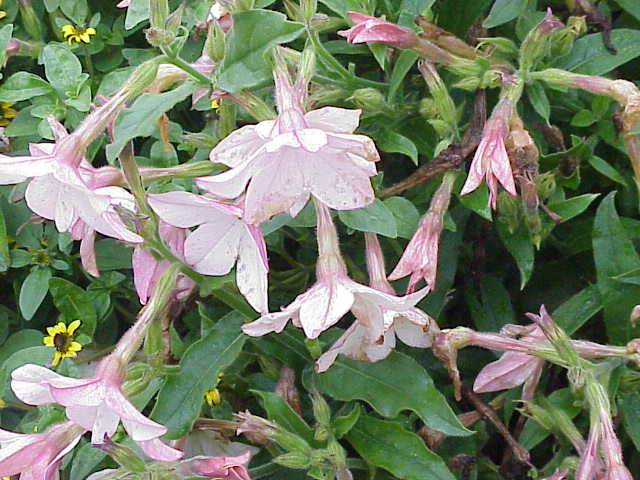
Nicotiana × sanderae ornamental cultivar

== Cultivation ==
Several species of Nicotiana, such as N. sylvestris, N. alata 'Lime Green' and N. langsdorffii are grown as ornamental plants, often under the name of flowering tobacco. They are popular vespertines (evening bloomers); their sweet-smelling flowers opening in the evening to be visited by hawkmoths and other pollinators. In temperate climates, they behave as annuals (hardiness 9a–11). The hybrid cultivar 'Lime Green' has gained the Royal Horticultural Society's Award of Garden Merit.

Garden varieties are derived from N. alata (e.g., the 'Niki' and 'Saratoga' series) and more recently from Nicotiana × sanderae (e.g., the 'Perfume' and 'Domino' series).

The tobacco budworm (Chloridea virescens) has proved to be a massive "pest" of many species in the genus, and has resisted many attempts at management.

== Bibliography ==
- Integrated Taxonomic Information System (ITIS) (1999): Nicotiana. Retrieved 2007-11-20.
- Panter, K.E.; Keeler, R.F.; Bunch, T.D.; Callan, R.J. (1990). "Congenital skeletal malformations and cleft palate induced in goats by ingestion of Lupinus, Conium and Nicotiana species". Toxicon. 28 (12): 1377–1385. Bibcode:1990Txcn...28.1377P. doi:10.1016/0041-0101(90)90154-y. PMID 2089736.
- Ren, Nan; Timko, Michael P (2001). "AFLP analysis of genetic polymorphism and evolutionary relationships among cultivated and wild Nicotiana species". Genome. 44 (4): 559–571. doi:10.1139/gen-44-4-559. PMID 11550889.
