= List of tobacco products =

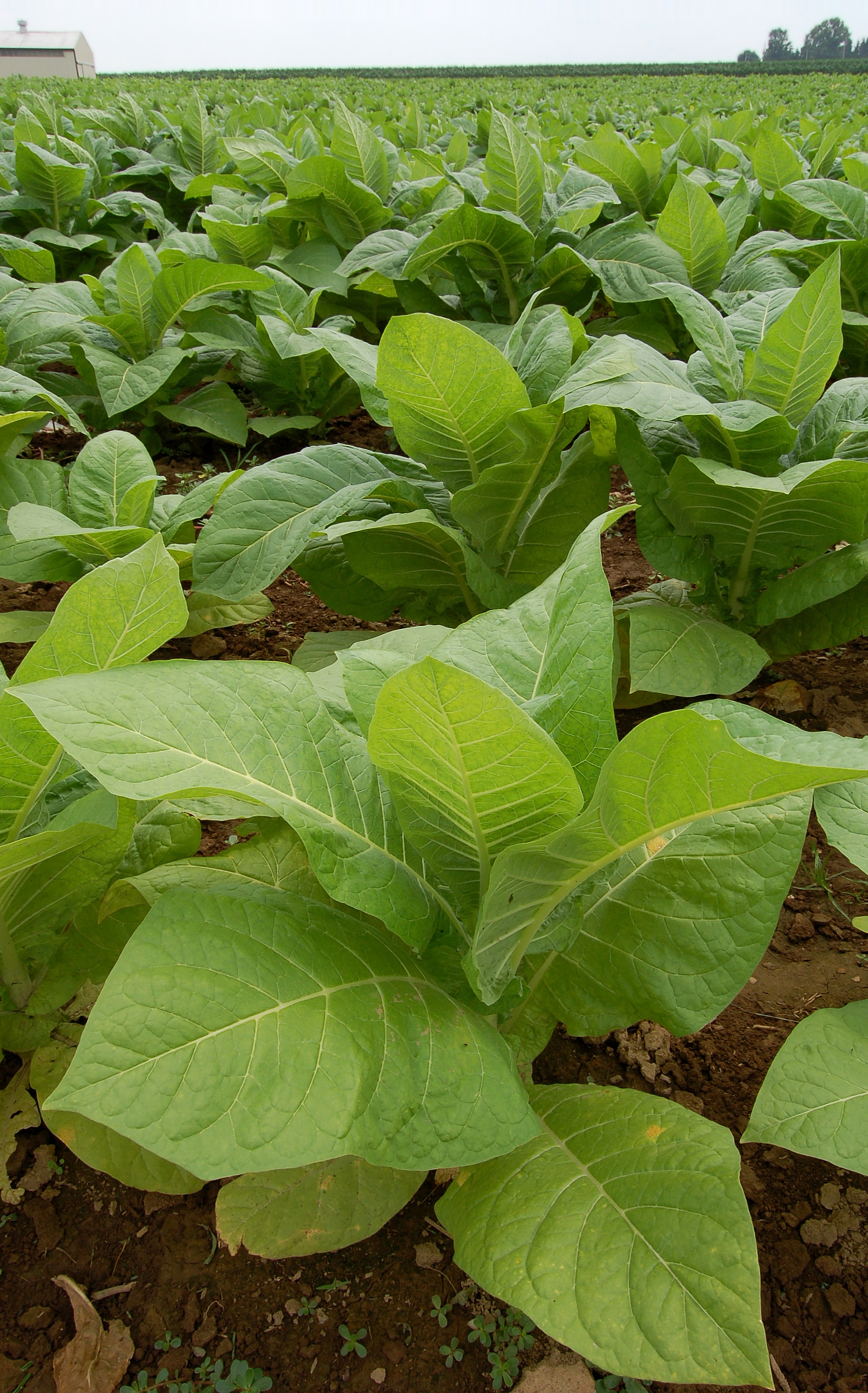
Nicotiana tabacum (cultivated tobacco) plants growing in Intercourse, Pennsylvania

Tobacco is the agricultural product of the leaves of plants in the genus Nicotiana, commonly called 'tobacco plants'. It is widely legally sold and used recreationally through various routes of administration (most commonly smoking) for the addictive drug nicotine – a stimulant alkaloid found in all parts of the plants except the seeds.

Nicotine is most heavily concentrated in the leaves (and hence makes up most tobacco products), which occurs in varying amounts depending on the species of Nicotiana grown; the breed, type, or variety of tobacco cultivated and produced; and the method used to cure and process tobacco leaves once they have been harvested. Tobacco sales (particularly cigarettes) reached a height in the 20th century, but have since reduced due to the discovery of the health effects of smoking tobacco.

This article provides a list of tobacco preparations and products. This list includes both tobacco products meant for consumption and those intended for other uses. Under the heading of consumable tobacco products, several categories of tobacco product are described in this list. Of these four basic categories, the first two include what are most often traditional types of tobacco products and preparations, relegated to the broad sub-categories of smoked tobacco and smokeless tobacco; the latter two categories include those types of tobacco products which have only recently been developed or widely adopted: heated tobacco products and nicotine-only products.

A sub-category of nicotine-only products, nicotinized herbal tobacco alternatives, consists of products which include added nicotine but mainly consist of non-tobacco herbal or plant material.

Following is a brief description of each of these categories:

- Smoked tobacco products — Tobacco-containing products which consist of tobacco meant for smoking. Common smoked tobacco products include cigarettes, cigars, and hookah tobacco (usually mu'assel).
- Smokeless tobacco products — Tobacco-containing products used in a manner which does not produce smoke, while still being distinct from heated tobacco products. Common smokeless tobacco products include dipping tobacco (also called moist snuff or dip), snus, and the various forms of chewing tobacco.
- Heated tobacco products — Tobacco-containing products used by heating tobacco in order to produce an aerosol or particulate suspension that can be inhaled. Also known as heat-not-burn tobacco products or smokeless cigarettes, common lines of heated tobacco products include IQOS tobacco cylinders and the loose tobacco blends vaporized in Pax dry herb vaporizers.
- Nicotine-only products — Nicotine-containing products that do not contain tobacco, featuring nicotine either extracted from tobacco or non-tobacco nicotine, usually synthetic nicotine. Common nicotine-only products include e-liquid (aerosolized using an e-cigarette or vape), nicotine pouches, and various types of nicotine replacement therapy products.
  - Nicotinized herbal tobacco alternatives — A sub-category of nicotine-only product which comprises products consisting of herbal or plant-based ingredients infused with nicotine, including nicotinized herbal cigarettes and herbal smokeless tobacco.

The molecular structure of nicotine, as depicted using a two-dimensional model. Nicotine is a highly addictive psychotropic drug and stimulant alkaloid, the main psychoactive constituent of tobacco.

== Overview ==
=== Cultivation and types of tobacco ===
The vast majority of commercially available tobacco is derived from the species Nicotiana tabacum (cultivated tobacco or common tobacco), although to a lesser extent it is also produced from Nicotiana alata, Nicotiana clevelandii, Nicotiana longiflora, and Nicotiana rustica, among others. (This is especially the case in certain areas, among particular cultures, or by certain industries or businesses; for example, the use of N. alata to produce particular kinds of hookah tobacco by various tobacco companies or retailers in Iran.) N. rustica (called Aztec tobacco, strong tobacco, thuốc lào in Vietnam, mapacho in South America, and makhorka (Russian: маxорка) in Russia) in particular contains much more nicotine than N. tabacum and other species of Nicotiana, and forms the basis of a number of unique tobacco products, as well as typically noncommercial preparations traditionally used in a shamanic, spiritual, or entheogenic context by various Indigenous peoples of the Americas. (For example, the use of rapéh mapacho snuff by Indigenous Brazilians.)

Once tobacco has been grown, harvested, cured, and processed, it is used to produce a number of different products, both commercial and noncommercial. These are most often consumable; however, tobacco and the nicotine derived from it are also used to create pesticides.

=== Terminology ===
Tobacco products, when the term is used to refer specifically to those products which contain material from the tobacco plant and are intended for consumption, often implies two general categories of product: smoked tobacco and smokeless tobacco.

When the term tobacco product is used to refer to any product containing tobacco or nicotine and intended for consumption, a third and fourth category of such products may become relevant, and especially with regard to recent developments in methods of nicotine consumption: heated tobacco products (HTPs) and nicotine-only products (also called alternative nicotine products or simply nicotine products)—the latter term itself essentially a misnomer because, while nicotine-only products do not contain tobacco, but rather nicotine in the absence of tobacco, they typically also contain other ingredients besides nicotine—both of which function to deliver nicotine to a user while potentially providing harm reduction from the negative effects of using smokeless tobacco or consuming tobacco smoke. (Tobacco smoke contains tar, carbon monoxide, and other dangerous constituents; tobacco in general normally contains high levels of carcinogenic nitrosamines.)

Another phrase used to denote various types of tobacco product, including "tobacco-adjacent products" which contain synthetic, or non-tobacco, derived nicotine (non-tobacco nicotine, or NTN), is alternative tobacco products—a catch-all term for any non-cigarette tobacco product.

An expert in tobacco, tobacco products, and tobacciana (objects, accoutrements, and paraphernalia associated with tobacco consumption, and especially items of historical or collectible value)—namely pipes, pipe tobacco, and cigars—including their procurement and sale, is called a tobacconist. (The term tobacconist may also refer to the type of business run by tobacconists; to a lesser extent the word refers to retail outlets, often called smoke shops or head shops, that typically sell tobacco products alongside other smoking products, legal psychotropics, cannabis culture-associated products and paraphernalia, and related consumables and accoutrements.)

=== Health impacts ===
==== Tobacco products ====
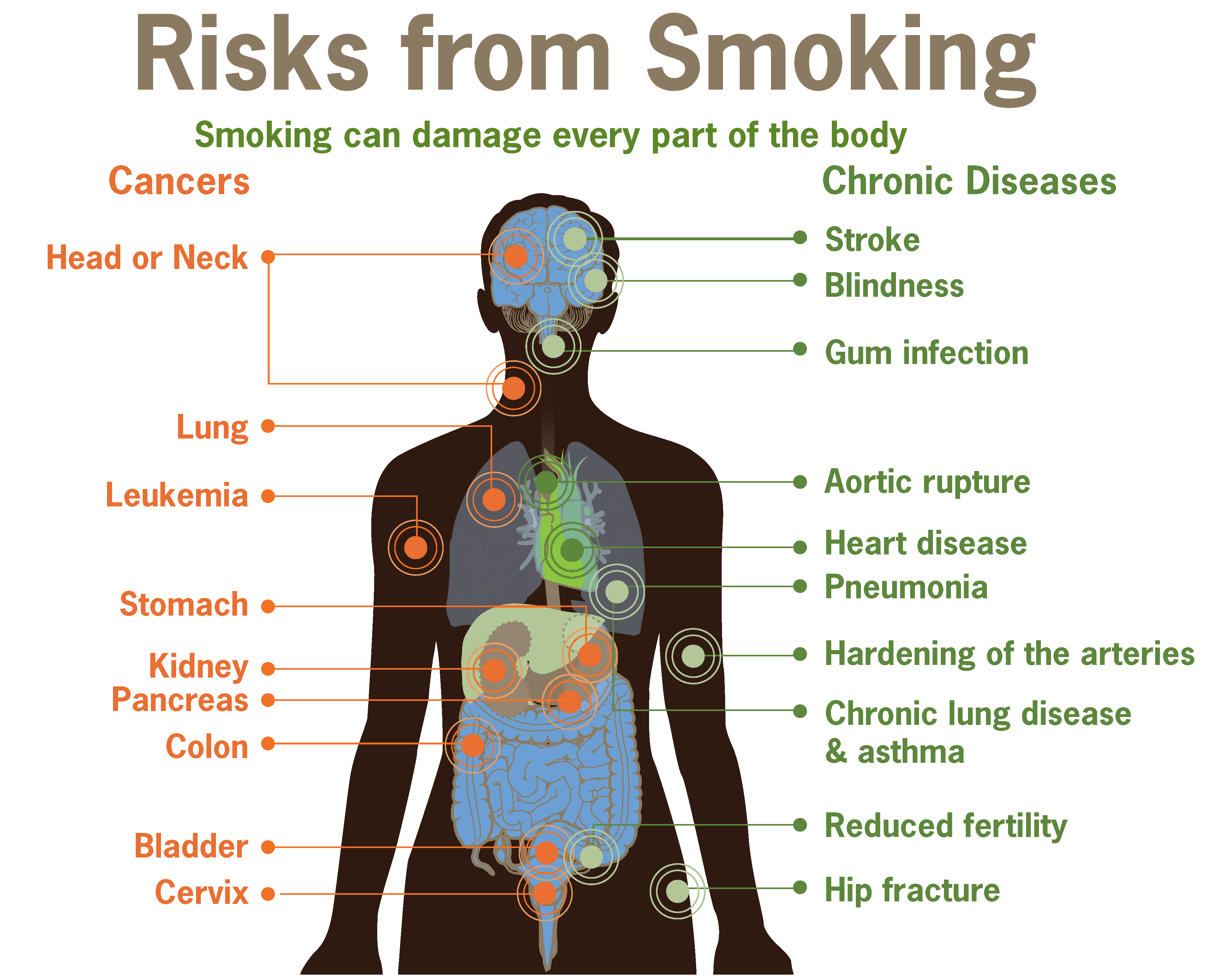
A diagram depicting the risks to health caused by smoking tobacco, most often cigarettes

The health effects of tobacco consumption are significantly deleterious: tobacco use, and especially smoked and smokeless tobacco use, is associated with the development and aggravation of numerous diseases, many of which may lead to mortality or a lessening of lifespan and quality of life. Nicotine is an exceptionally addictive chemical, its repeated consumption associated with a high likelihood of developing a physical and psychological dependence upon the substance. (Additionally, nicotine withdrawal is associated with nicotine cessation following addiction or habituation to nicotine—this includes the discontinuation of tobacco smoking.)

While nicotine is one of the most widely used recreational drugs, the consequences of its popularity and addictiveness are considerably negative. The effects of the prevalence of tobacco consumption upon society include what has long been the leading preventable cause of death worldwide, economic losses, and serious strains upon the healthcare systems of various countries.

There is some evidence to suggest that when nicotine is consumed in the form of tobacco, MAOIs called harmala alkaloids present in the tobacco leaf may interact with nicotine in the body to increase its effects, and therefore addictiveness.

==== Nicotine-only products ====
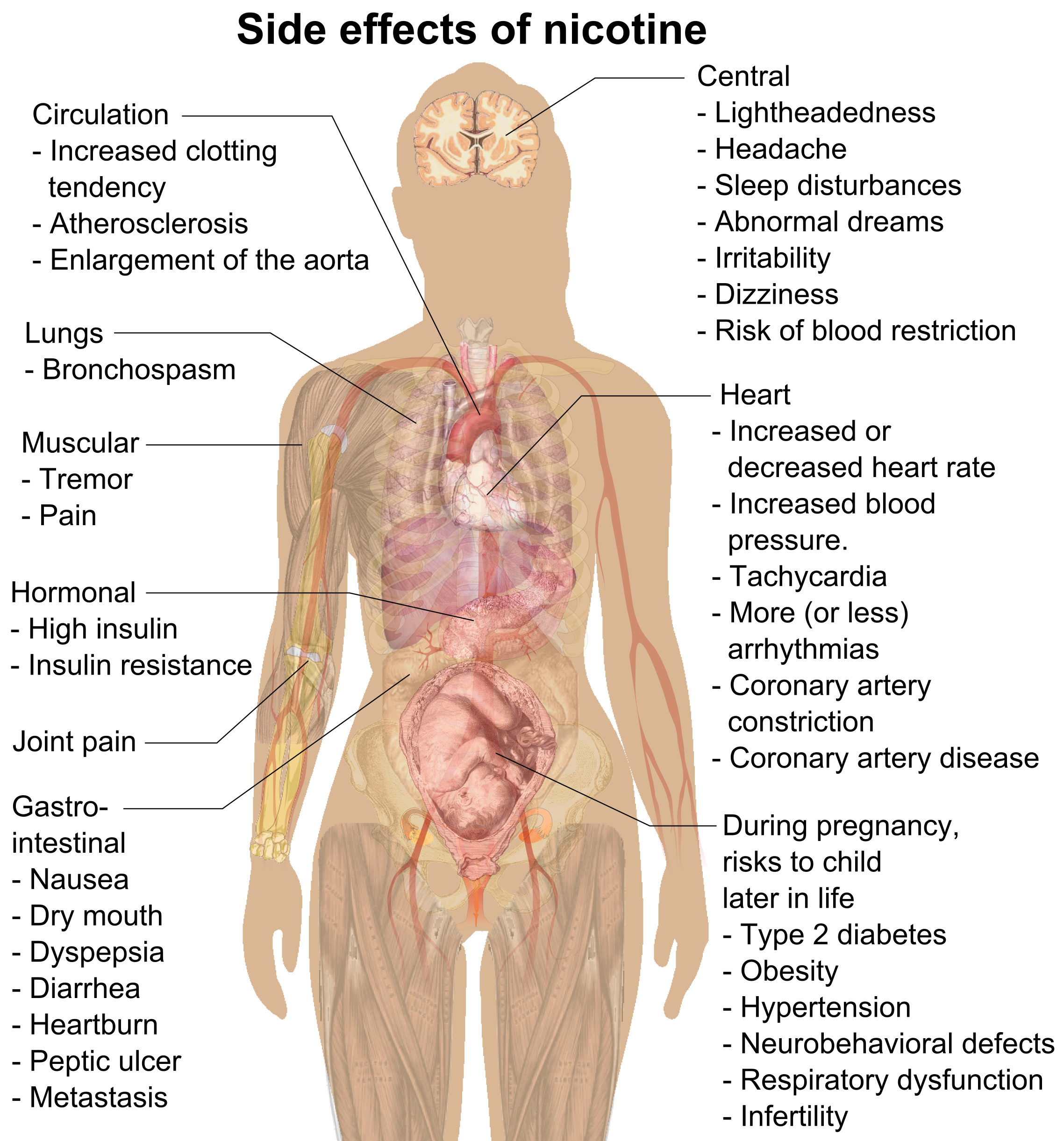
A diagram depicting the side effects of consuming nicotine

of what are largely recently developed products: that is, nicotine-containing products which do not contain tobacco, i.e. non-tobacco products which contain either nicotine isolated from tobacco or non-tobacco nicotine (NTN, as abbreviated by the U.S. Food and Drug Administration, mainly consisting of products containing synthetic nicotine).

This type of product mainly includes nicotine products consisting of nicotine—typically free nicotine, nicotine salts, or nicotine polacrilex—combined with other ingredients, which themselves may or may not be harmful to health depending on the particular ingredients in question and the route of administration involved.

E-cigarette liquid (otherwise known as vape juice, e-liquid, vape oil, or simply juice), for instance, may contain ingredients that when vaped (aerosolized and inhaled) alongside nicotine, such as formaldehyde, are harmful to health and well-being. However, scientific evidence currently points to the possibility that e-cigarettes are at least somewhat safer than conventional (combustible) cigarettes.

The use of nicotine, either in the absence of tobacco or via tobacco consumption, produces a number of physiological effects. These include, but are not limited to: a form of euphoric intoxication typically known among recreational users as a buzz, nicotine buzz, or nic buzz; changes in blood pressure and circulation; and acute—or, with frequent or repeated use, chronic—alterations of the hormonal, cardiac, gastrointestinal, and central nervous systems; with acute adverse effects including nausea, lightheadedness, sleep disturbances, rapid heart rate, and headaches.

The only medicinal nicotine agents currently approved as safe for medical intervention—namely nicotine cessation—are nicotine replacement therapy products. NRT products were first approved for use in 1984, when they were introduced in the United States.

A more recent introduction to the growing list of tobacco- and tobacco-related products generally, alternative nicotine products are a type of nicotine-only product which were developed, and are intended, for potential recreational use, rather than for strictly medicinal purposes. (As are NRT products.)

== Consumable ==
=== Heated tobacco products ===
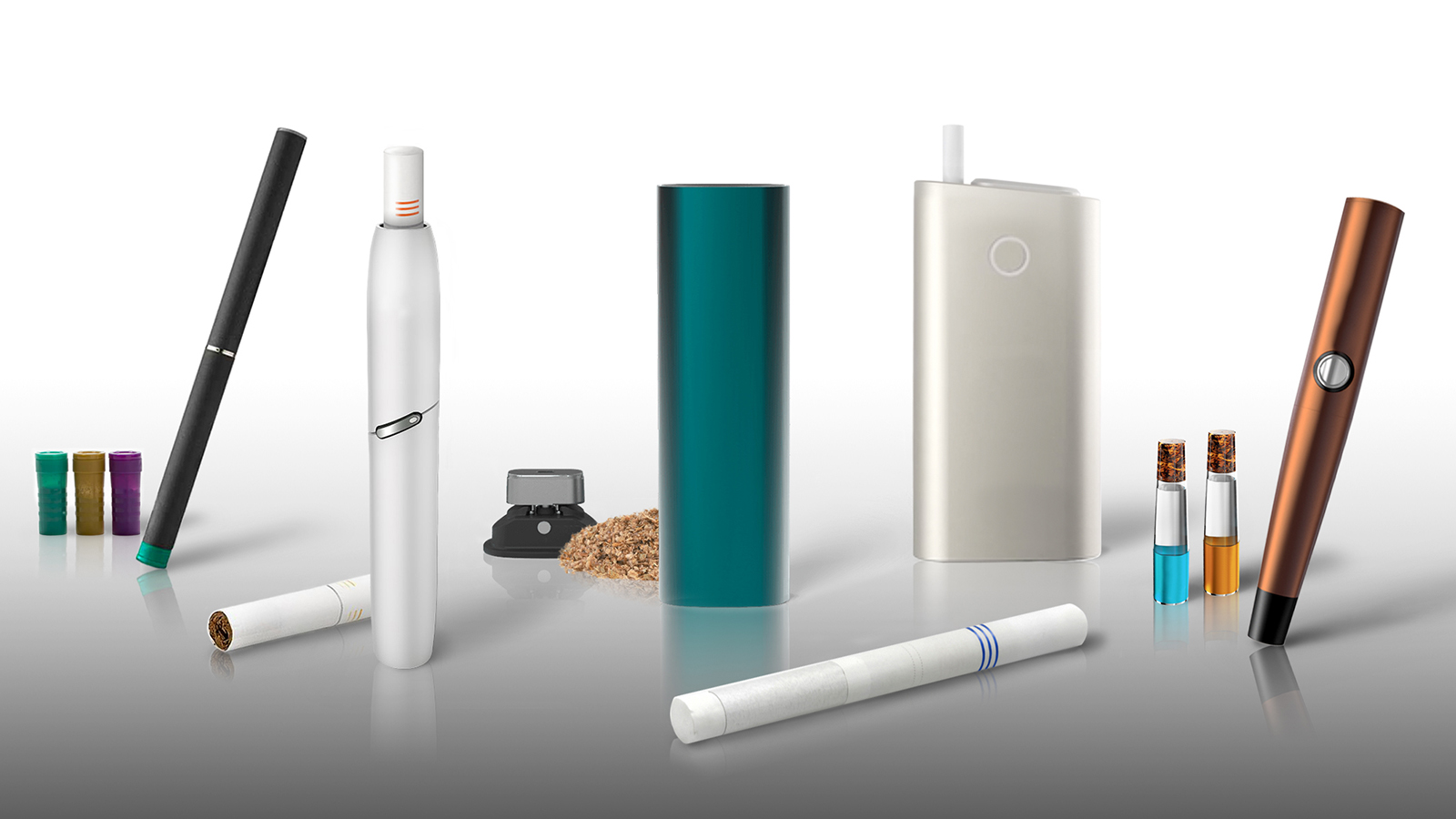
Various heated tobacco products alongside their heating and/or charging elements

Heated tobacco products (HTPs) are a relatively recent introduction among the various types of tobacco products: also known as "heat-not-burn" or "heat, not burn" products ("heat-not-burn" being a marketing term employed by the tobacco industry), the use of HTPs involves heating tobacco at a temperature lower than conventional, combustible cigarettes.

=== Nicotine-only products ===
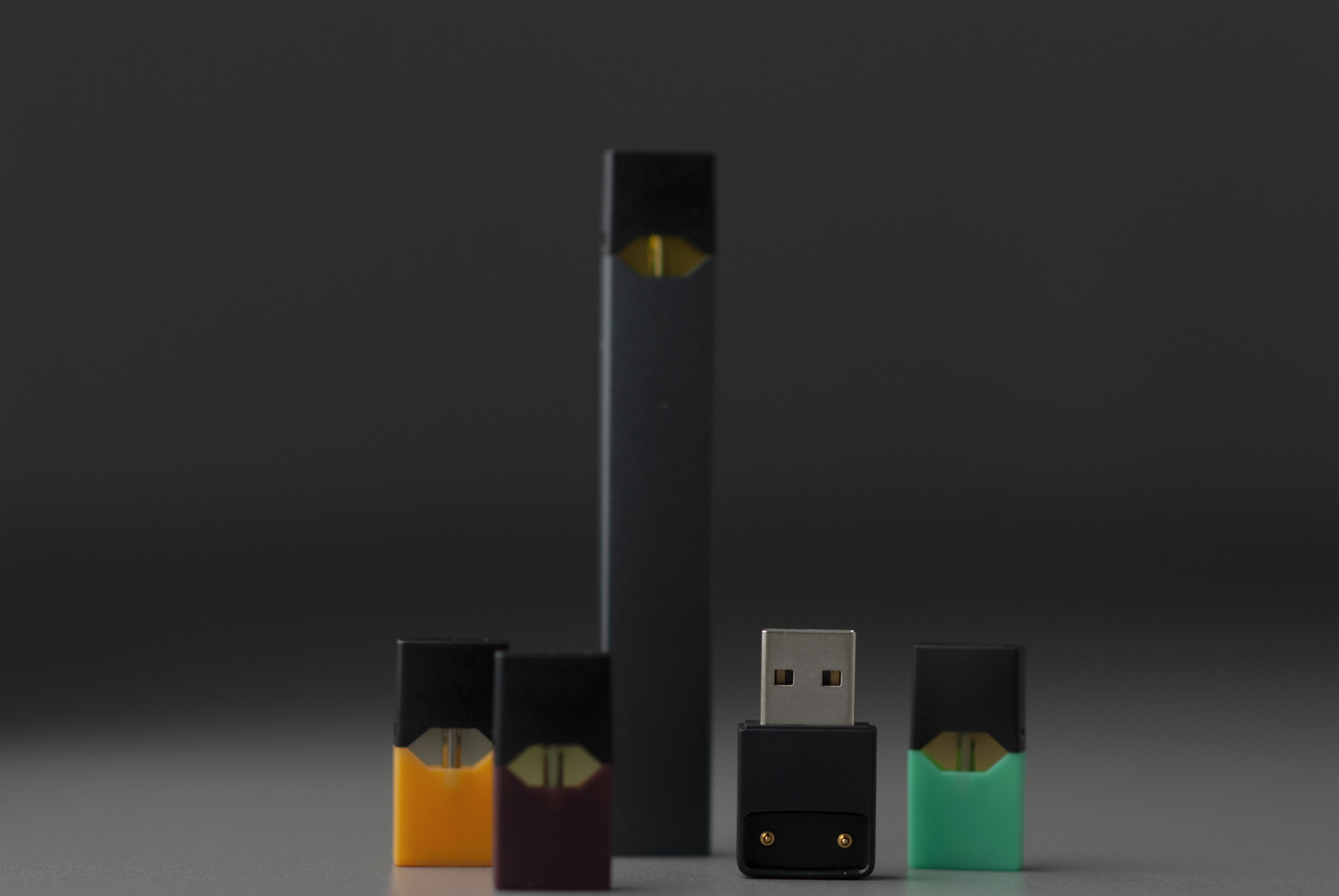
A JUUL brand nicotine aerosolizer or vaporizer ("vape"), produced in the common electronic cigarette (e-cigarette) style. Vapes and e-cigarettes are examples of nicotine-only products.

Nicotine-only products are, like HTPs, a category of tobacco product which, except in the case of nicotine replacement therapy (NRT) products, were developed only somewhat recently. Nicotine-only products consist of nicotine in the absence of tobacco, whether the nicotine contained in the product is extracted from tobacco plants or synthesized. They include nicotine-containing e-liquid—aerosolized in an e-cigarette or "vape"—nicotine pouches, and NRT products—those used to achieve nicotine cessation or tobacco cessation—such as pharmaceutical nicotine gum, nicotine lozenges, nicotine patches, and nicotine inhalers. The term alternative nicotine products refers specifically to those nicotine-only products which, unlike NRT products, have been developed for recreational, rather than strictly medicinal, use: these include the aforementioned e-liquid and nicotine pouches, as well as disposable or pre-filled nicotine vaporizers and nicotine toothpicks.

=== Smoked tobacco ===
==== Cigars ====
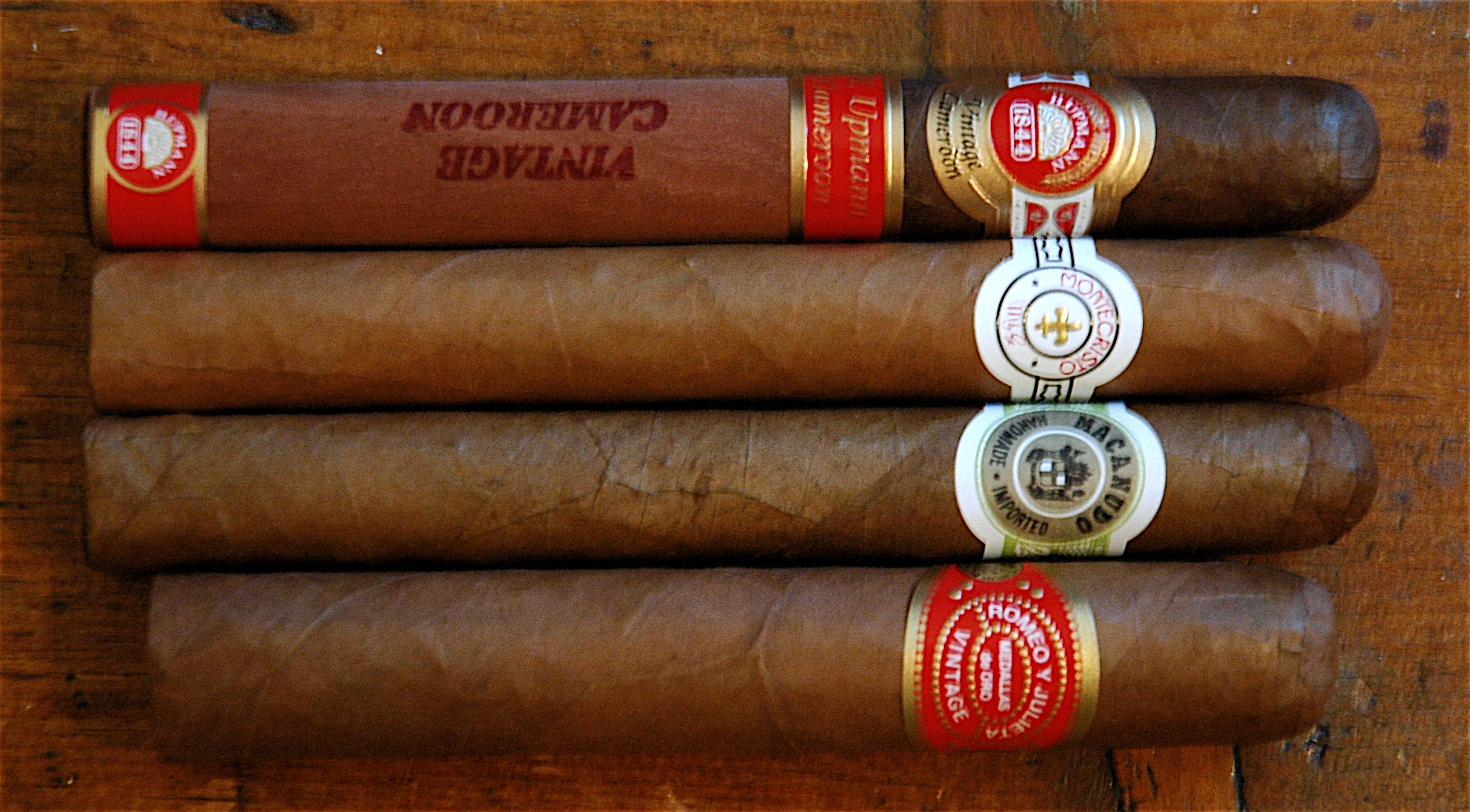
Several different cigars

A cigar is a tightly rolled bundle of dried and fermented tobacco which is ignited so that its smoke may be drawn into the smoker's mouth and expelled; thus the cigar is generally "puffed on" (like a tobacco pipe) as opposed to being inhaled from (as is the case with cigarettes). The cigar is one of the oldest methods of preparing tobacco for consumption, some of the first cigars being introduced to Europeans as rolls of tobacco smoked by the Taíno people of 15th century Cuba.

There are numerous varieties of cigar, differentiated by their size, shape, color, and composition. Some products developed from the cigar are, however, markedly different from the traditional product. (Cigarillos, blunts, and little cigars, for instance.) Cigarettes may be the most notable example of this deviation, although they do, in a sense, represent a category of their own.

Tobacciana associated with cigars include cigar ashtrays, cigar tubes, cigar boxes, cigar holders (also known as cigar mouthpieces, which are similar to cigarette holders), cigar cutters (including cigar scissors or shears), cigar cases, and humidors.

===== Blunts =====
Blunts are wide, somewhat stubby versions of cigars. Most, if not all, are machine-made "domestic cigars" created from homogenized or reconstituted tobacco. They are usually inexpensive, and only lightly fermented.

===== Cigarillos =====
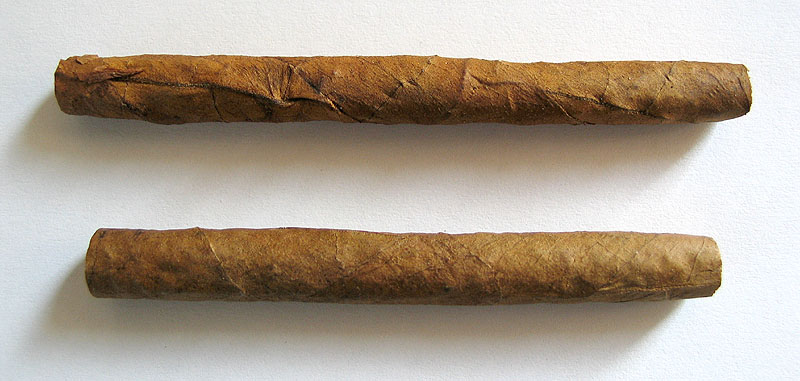
Two cigarillos

Cigarillos are long, thin cigars, somewhat larger than cigarettes but smaller than regular cigars. They may be fitted into a cigarillo holder in order to be smoked, though they are most often smoked without such a device. Using a cutting tool in order to prepare a cigarillo is less common than with larger cigars, as they are often open on both ends. Cigarillos may be machine-made, although many hand-made versions do exist; the latter are often produced by premium cigar manufacturers. In modern-day America, machine-made cigarillos can be used as marijuana cigars in a manner similar to machine made-large cigars.

===== Little cigars =====
A little cigar is a cigar that is the same size as a cigarette—often featuring a filter—however, it still retains its identity as a cigar because it is wrapped in a tobacco leaf, or more often a paper wrapper made of tobacco pulp, reconstituted tobacco or homogenized tobacco. Flavored little cigars are available on the market as well. Flavored little cigars have been steadily increasing in popularity among cigar smokers. Manufacturers like Prime Time have been offering flavored little cigars since 1993.

===== Roll-your-own cigars =====
Several manufacturers have begun producing cigar wraps. Cigar wraps consist of tobacco leaf which can then be used with a tobacco blend to produce a hand-rolled cigar.

==== Cigarettes ====
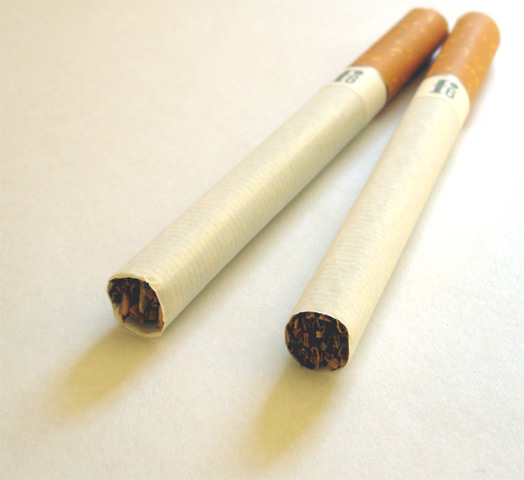
Two unlit, filtered German cigarettes

Cigarettes are a product consumed by smoking and manufactured out of cured and finely cut tobacco leaves and reconstituted tobacco, often combined with other additives, then rolled or stuffed into a paper-wrapped cylinder (generally less than 120 mm in length and 10 mm in diameter).

===== Bidis =====
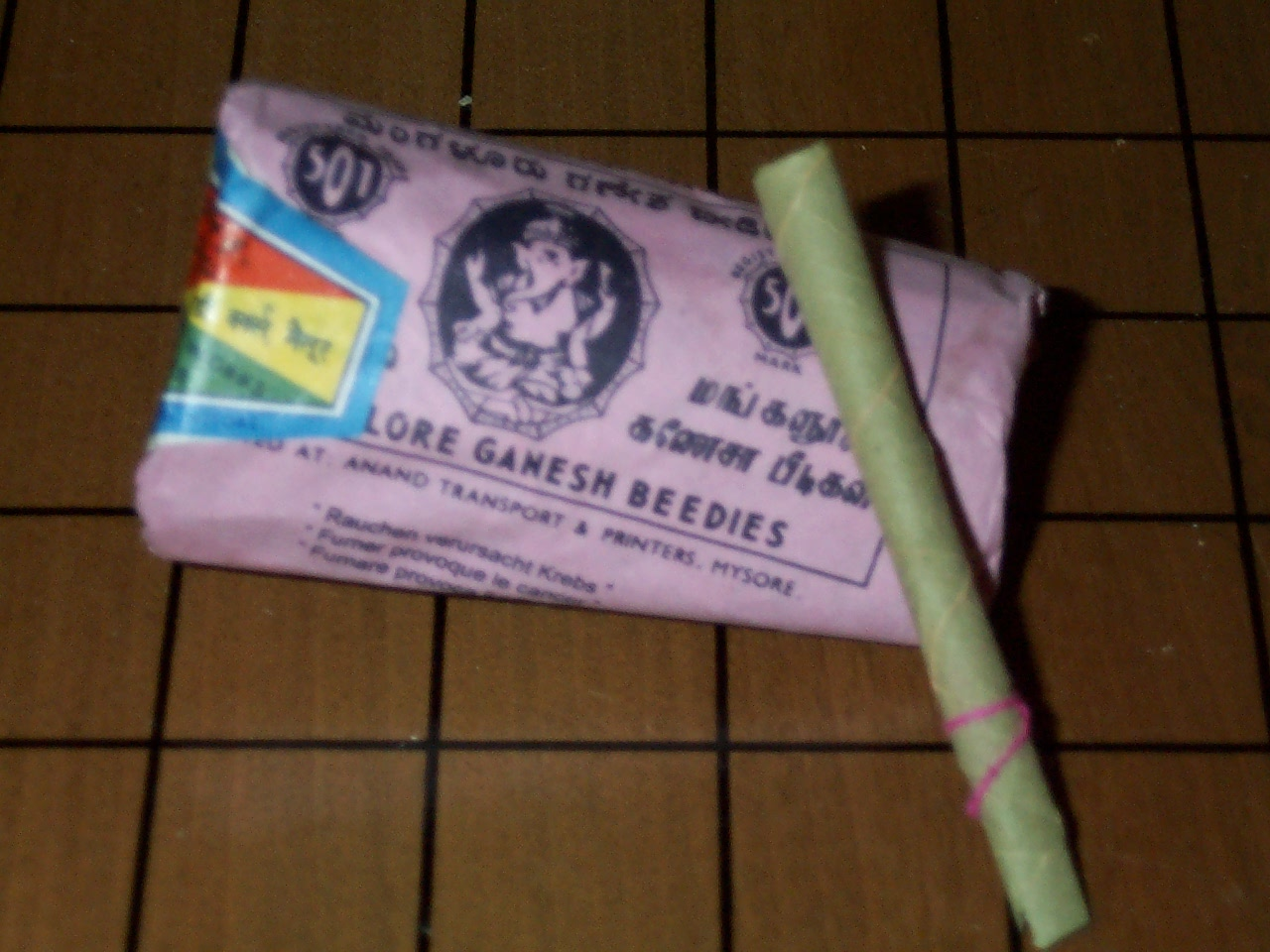
Mangalore Ganesh brand beedis

Beedis or bidis (also biris) are cigarette- or miniature cigar-like tubes of tobacco. They are similar to unfiltered cigarettes, except that they are wrapped in leaves—typically tendu leaves—rather than paper. They originate from the Indian subcontinent, where they are popular for smoking.

===== Kreteks =====
Kreteks are cigarettes made with a complex blend of tobacco, cloves and a flavoring 'sauce'.

===== Roll-Your-Own =====
Roll-Your-Own (RYO) or hand-rolled cigarettes, are very popular particularly in European countries. These are prepared from loose tobacco, cigarette papers and filters all bought separately. They are usually much cheaper to make.

==== Pipe tobacco ====
===== Dokha =====
Dokha is a tobacco of Iranian origin mixed with leaves, bark, and herbs. It is traditionally smoked in a midwakh.

===== Kizami =====
Kizami is a tobacco product produced in Japan and intended for smoking in Japanese kiseru pipes.

===== Mu'assel =====
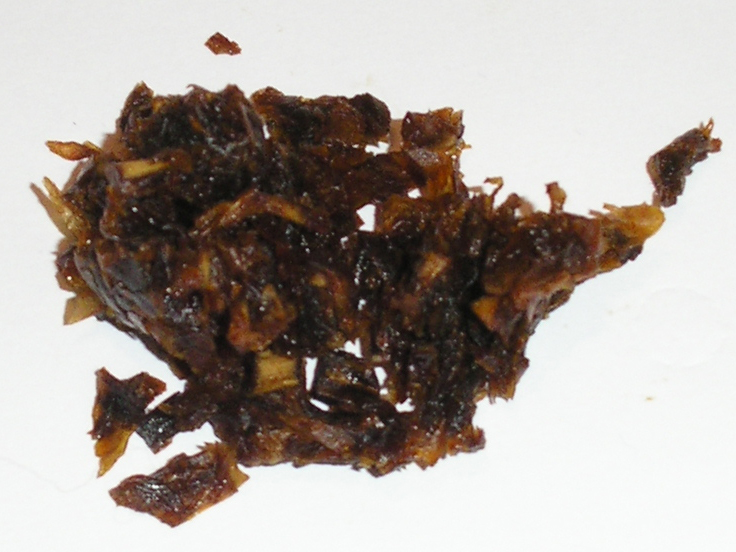
Mu'assel or shisha tobacco

Mu'assel, shisha tobacco, hookah tobacco, or simply shisha is a somewhat moist form of tobacco that is mixed with glycerin and coagulated with molasses or other sticky sweeteners. It has been popular in the Middle East for centuries. It is often smoked with a hookah. Its names include ma'sal (also romanized as mu'assel, as above), tumbâk and jurâk.

=== Smokeless tobacco ===
Smokeless tobacco products are tobacco-containing products which do not require smoking in order to be used or consumed. More specifically, the phrase smokeless tobacco typically refers to such products without reference to HTPs and nicotine-only products, regardless of the fact that neither HTPs nor nicotine-only products require one to smoke tobacco in order to use them.

==== Mixed routes of administration ====
===== Kuber =====
Kuber is a smokeless tobacco product known for its highly addictive properties and its unique presentation disguised as a mouth freshener. Users commonly add it to tea or consume it directly by placing a pinch under the lower lip.

==== Nasal administration ====
===== Snuff =====
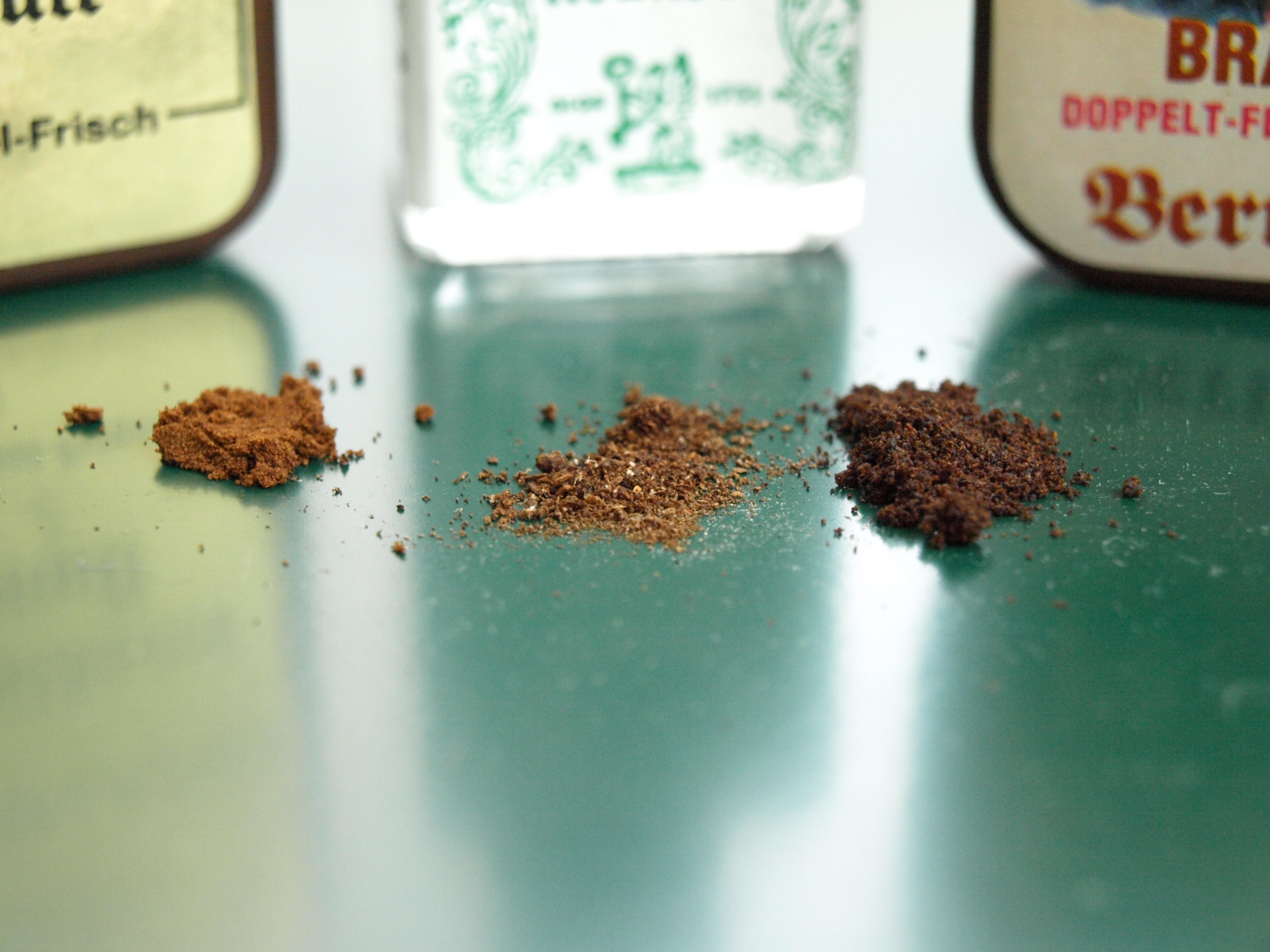
Several types and consistencies of nasal snuff, otherwise known as dry snuff

Snuff is a generic term for finely-ground smokeless tobacco products.

Originally, the term snuff referred specifically to dry snuff, otherwise known as nasal snuff, though today the word snuff, when used on its own, may also refer to other pulverized tobacco products such as dipping tobacco and snus.

Snuff etymologically derives from the Dutch language, and likely Middle Dutch specifically: in the 16th century the Dutch, for whom the terms "sniff" and "snuff" were essentially synonymous at the time, referred to nasal snuff as snuf (Dutch: "sniff" or "snuff"), from snuffen (Dutch: "sniffing", "to sniff" or "snuffing", "to snuff"), the word snuf short for snuftabak (Dutch: "sniff tobacco" or "snuff tobacco", cognate to the German schnupftabak). (Presently, in contemporary Modern Dutch, the term snuf has largely given way to snuif (Dutch: "sniff" or "snort", from snuiven (Dutch: "sniffing", "to sniff", sometimes translated as "snorting", "to snort")), and today snuftabak is more often rendered snuiftabak (Dutch: lit. "sniff[ing] tobacco" or "snort[ing] tobacco", though practically "snuff[ing] tobacco"). Likewise, in the English-speaking world the terms "snuff" and "snuffing" (whether as nouns or verbs) are rarely used in reference to the act of insufflation, sniffing, or snorting in comparison to "sniff" and "sniffing", respectively.) Hence the term "snuff" originated from snuf and "snuff tobacco" from snuftabak.

Nasal snuff is a fine tobacco dust, flour, or powder meant for light insufflation, or "snuffing", popular and widespread mainly in the 18th century. (Dry snuff is still used today, albeit much less often than other, more popular tobacco products.)

Believed to have originated among the indigenous peoples of Central and South America, namely peoples endemic to the territory of modern-day Brazil, members of Christopher Columbus's crew observed native Caribbean peoples insufflating a snuff-like preparation of tobacco in the late 15th century. Soon after introduced to Europe, snuff was being produced by the Spanish royal tobacco monopoly in the 17th century, and later came to popularity in England in the same century. By the 18th century the habit of snuff use had spread throughout much of the world, though in the 19th, and especially 20th, centuries nasal snuff had largely fallen into disuse. The 20th century witnessed an explosive increase in the popularity of cigarettes as the predominant and preferred type of tobacco product, first in the Western world, and later throughout much of the rest of the world, due to which both nasal snuff and other tobacco products became much less popular among tobacco consumers. The popularity of nasal snuff has increased in the 21st century, though only marginally.

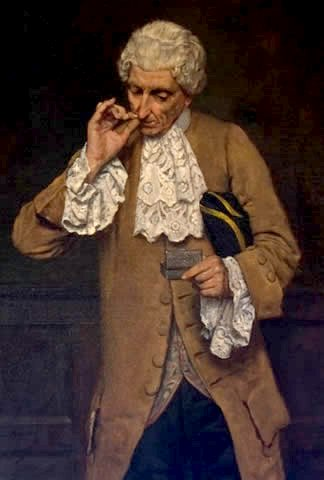
Painting of a man taking a pinch of nasal snuff

Several broad categories of dry snuff exist:

- American-style (dry) snuff — A form of nasal snuff originating from the United States, although based upon the earlier development of European-style nasal snuff, and intended for either snuffing into the nostrils or placing between the lip and gum, the latter method allowing for the product to be used like dipping tobacco. (Also known as (American) moist snuff.)
  - Scotch snuff — A particular style of American dry snuff produced by scorching tobacco until it is dried and cured; it is then used to produce snuff. The term Scotch snuff is a folk-etymology derivation referring to this scorching process.
- European-style (dry) snuff — A style of dry snuff intended, almost exclusively, to be shallowly "sniffed" or "snuffed" into the nose, where nicotine is absorbed through the mucous membranes in the nostrils. (Snuff is not deeply "snorted" (such as in the way cocaine powder is) because snuff isn't intended to move beyond the nose, i.e. into the sinuses, throat or lungs.) European-style nasal snuff comes in several varieties:
  - Plain (otherwise known as natural snuff) – A type of European tobacco snuff without the addition of flavorants.
  - Rappee — The term rappee coming from the French râpé ("grated"), rappee is a type of coarse, pungent snuff made from dark tobacco
  - Schmalzler — A type of snuff originating in Germanophone countries, schmalzler is schmalzed ("oiled").
  - Toast — A very dry and finely-ground type of snuff.

European-style nasal snuff also comes in numerous different flavors or aromas, including the so-called medicated variety (nasal snuff made with a scent basis of menthol, camphor, or eucalyptus). Other scent varieties of European-style snuff include gourmand snuff–scented with the aromas of foodstuffs—and SP snuff—often featuring a mixture of bergamot and citrus, as well as sometimes floral notes–the meaning of the acronym SP being unknown.

- Rapé (pronounced "hah-peh"; also transliterated rapéh, hapé, and hapéh) — A traditional preparation of tobacco, namely mapacho (N. rustica) leaves: the prototypical form of nasal snuff typically used in a shamanic, entheogenic, or ethnomedicinal context by certain Indigenous peoples of the Amazon Basin. The term rapé may be etymologically related to the word rappee, which refers to the particular style or form of European dry snuff mentioned above. Confusion may arise from the fact that the term rapé is used in Iberophone countries and by Ibero-Romance language (namely Portuguese and Spanish) speakers to refer to nasal snuff in general, rather than the particular form of nasal snuff produced and used by peoples native to the Amazon Basin region.

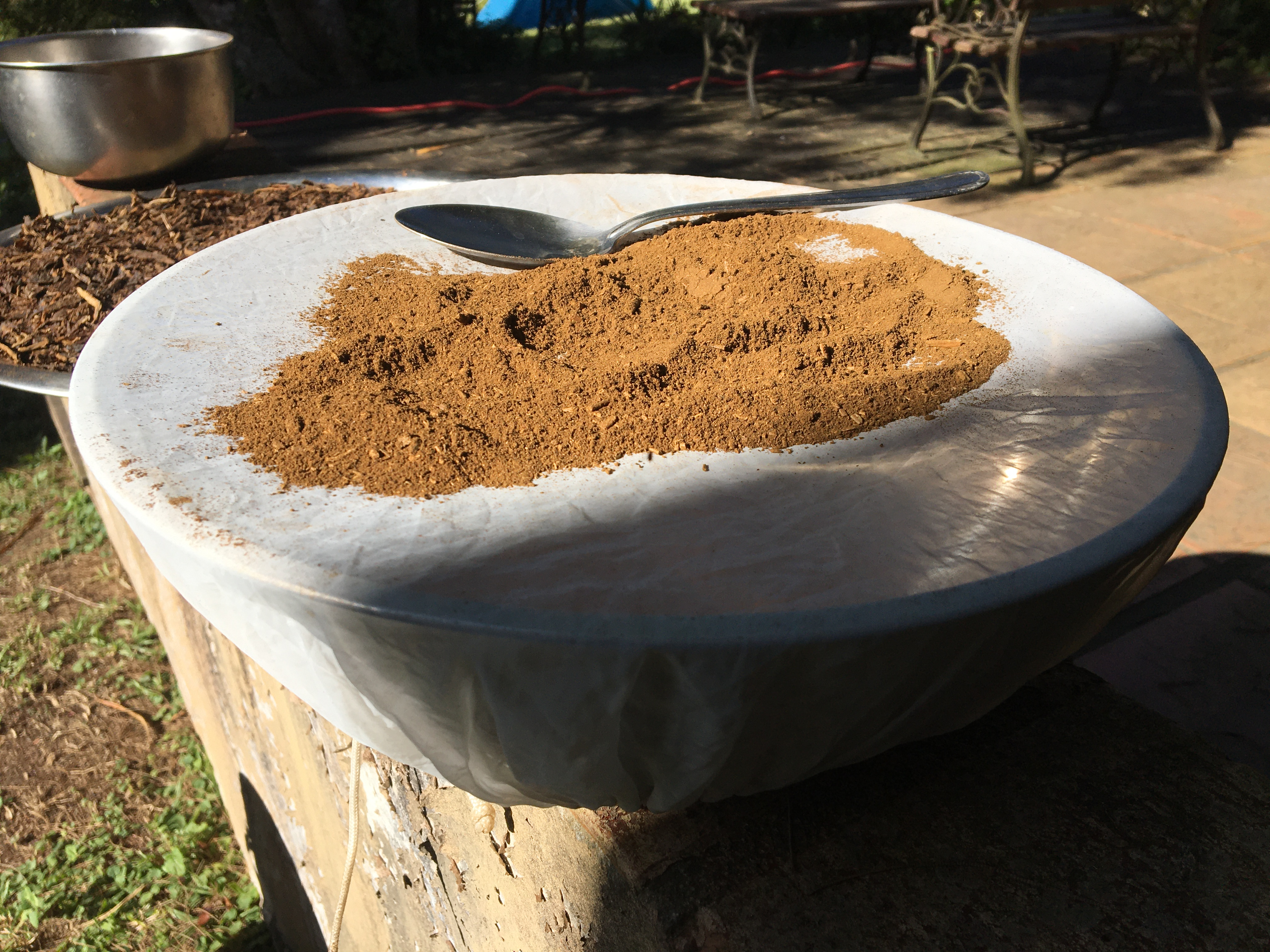
Preparation of traditional rapé nasal snuff by sieving

Nasal snuff comes in several consistencies, or "grinds", depending on how finely pulverized the tobacco leaves used to produce snuff are rendered: fine (fin), medium-fine to medium (demi-gros), and coarse (gros).

Levels of moisture may differ between varieties and brands of snuff, and between particular snuff products. Snuffs also differ in color, ranging from green to various shades of tan or brown to black or near-black.

It has been claimed that European-style nasal snuff originated in the U.K. town of Great Harwood, and was famously ground in the town's monument prior to local distribution and transport farther north to Scotland.

European (dry) snuff is mainly produced by the following brands: Toque Tobacco (UK), Bernards (Germany), Fribourg & Treyer (UK), Gawith (UK), Gawith Hoggarth (UK), Hedges (UK), Lotzbeck (Germany), McChrystal's (UK), Pöschl (Germany), Toque (UK), and Wilsons of Sharrow (UK).

Some well-known brands of American (dry) snuff are Carhart's CC, Peach Sweet, and Tube Rose.

Generally, a small portion of dry snuff is either pinched between the fingers (usually the thumb and forefinger) or laid out on the wrist (the anatomical snuffbox) of the user, from where it is sniffed. Other methods of taking snuff include using a device called a snuff bullet; the "boxcar method"—by which the user places snuff upon the tip of their thumbnail while it is tucked into the curled index finger—which allows the user to take a larger amount of snuff; utilizing a snuff ejector; snuffing snuff directly from a snuff spoon; and sniffing snuff through a special tube called a sniffer.

Tobacciana associated with nasal snuff use include snuff containers, whether totally sealable (such as snuff bottles, snuff boxes, snuff horns, snuff jars, and snuff tubes (snuff cylinders)) or containing an opening from which to take snuff (such as snuff bullets and snuff ejectors); and other accoutrements to augment or ease the process of, and hygiene surrounding, snuff use (such as handkerchiefs, sniffing tubes (sniffers), and snuff spoons).

While the use of nasal snuff—namely its habitual or repeated use—is typically not implicated in the development of lung cancer, it is known to be associated with an increased risk of developing cancers of the nasal cavity and nostrils, as well as those of the pancreas, throat, and mouth. However, a 2012 German research study on risk factors for nasal malignancies among German men found that cigarette smoking potentially increases the likelihood of developing nasal cancer more than the use of nasal snuff. Additionally, according to a letter written by L.M. Ramström, the director of the Institute for Tobacco Studies in Stockholm, and published in the British Dental Journal, the 2016 update to the Global Burden of Disease Study (GBD) found that the risk ratios (RRs) for developing oral and esophageal cancer due to the use of chewing tobacco were "significantly higher" than those associated with nasal snuff use; regarding both nasal snuff and snus use, researchers, via the GBD update, stated, "We did not find sufficient evidence of a RR greater than one for any health outcome."

FUBAR, a brand of Indian nasal snuff sold by the online snuff outlet MrSnuff, produces an herbal nasal snuff alternative infused with nicotine.

Moist snuff, a product of American origin, is synonymous with dipping tobacco or dip.

==== Oral mucosa ====
Products that utilizes the oral mucosa for absorption via buccal, sublabial, or sublingual administration.

===== Chewing tobacco =====
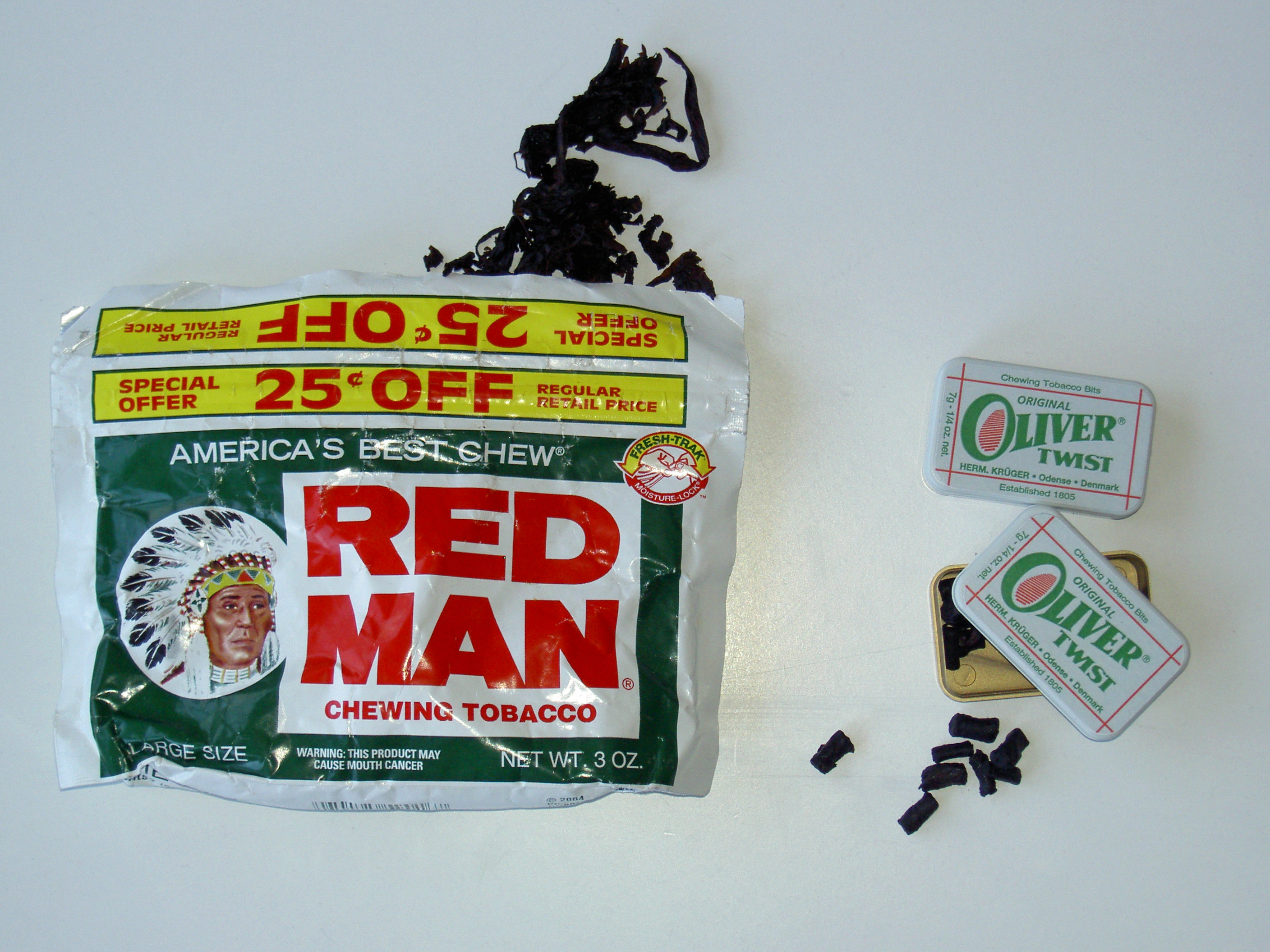
A pouch of Red Man loose leaf chewing tobacco and Oliver Twist tobacco bits/pellets

Chewing is one of the oldest methods of consuming tobacco leaves. Native Americans in both North and South America chewed the fresh leaves of the tobacco plant, frequently mixed with lime.

Kinds of chewing tobacco can broadly be divided into types from the Western world and those of Eastern origin, namely from the Indian subcontinent.

- Western chewing tobacco

Modern American-style chewing tobacco (colloquially known as chew or chaw, especially in the American South and Midwest) is produced from cured and often fermented tobacco, usually dampened and mixed with some type of sweetener. (Often molasses.) Twist tobacco may be an exception in this case, as many brands of twist are not sweetened.

In using chewing tobacco—at least types other than tobacco pellets—the consumer usually deposits the tobacco between the cheek and teeth and lightly macerates and sucks the tobacco to allow its juices to flow. Thus when chewing, it is common to spit and discard excess saliva caused by the release of juices from the tobacco, justifying the existence of the spittoon, or cuspidor.

The popularity of American-style chewing tobacco and the associated spittoon reached its height in the American Midwest during the late 19th century; however, as cigarettes became the predominant form of tobacco consumption the spittoon gradually fell into disuse across the United States. While spittoons are often a rarity in modern society, loose leaf chewing tobacco can still be purchased at many convenience stores or from tobacconists throughout the United States and Canada.

Chewing tobacco endemic to the Western world is manufactured in several forms:

Loose leaf

Loose leaf chewing tobacco, also known as scrap, is perhaps the most common contemporary form of American-style chewing tobacco. It consists of cut or shredded strips of tobacco leaf, and is usually sold in sealed pouches or bags lined with foil. Often sweetened, loose leaf chew may have a tacky texture. (Though there are also unflavored or "natural" loose leaf chews. However, these are far less common.) Popular, modern brands of scrap sold in North America include America's Best Chew, Levi Garrett, Jackson's Apple Jack (made by Swisher International), Beech-Nut (formerly made by Lorillard; now Reynolds American), and Stoker's.

Pellets

Pellets or bits consist of tobacco rolled into small pellets. They are often packaged in portable tins. Tobacco pellets are used in the same manner as snus, in that they are placed between the lip and gum, and that spitting is typically unnecessary. It is suggested that the user may periodically chew the pellets lightly in order to release additional juice, flavor, and/or nicotine. Tobacco bits are almost exclusively produced under the Northern European Oliver Twist and Piccanell brands. They are thus—like snus—preponderant in the Scandinavian region.

Plug

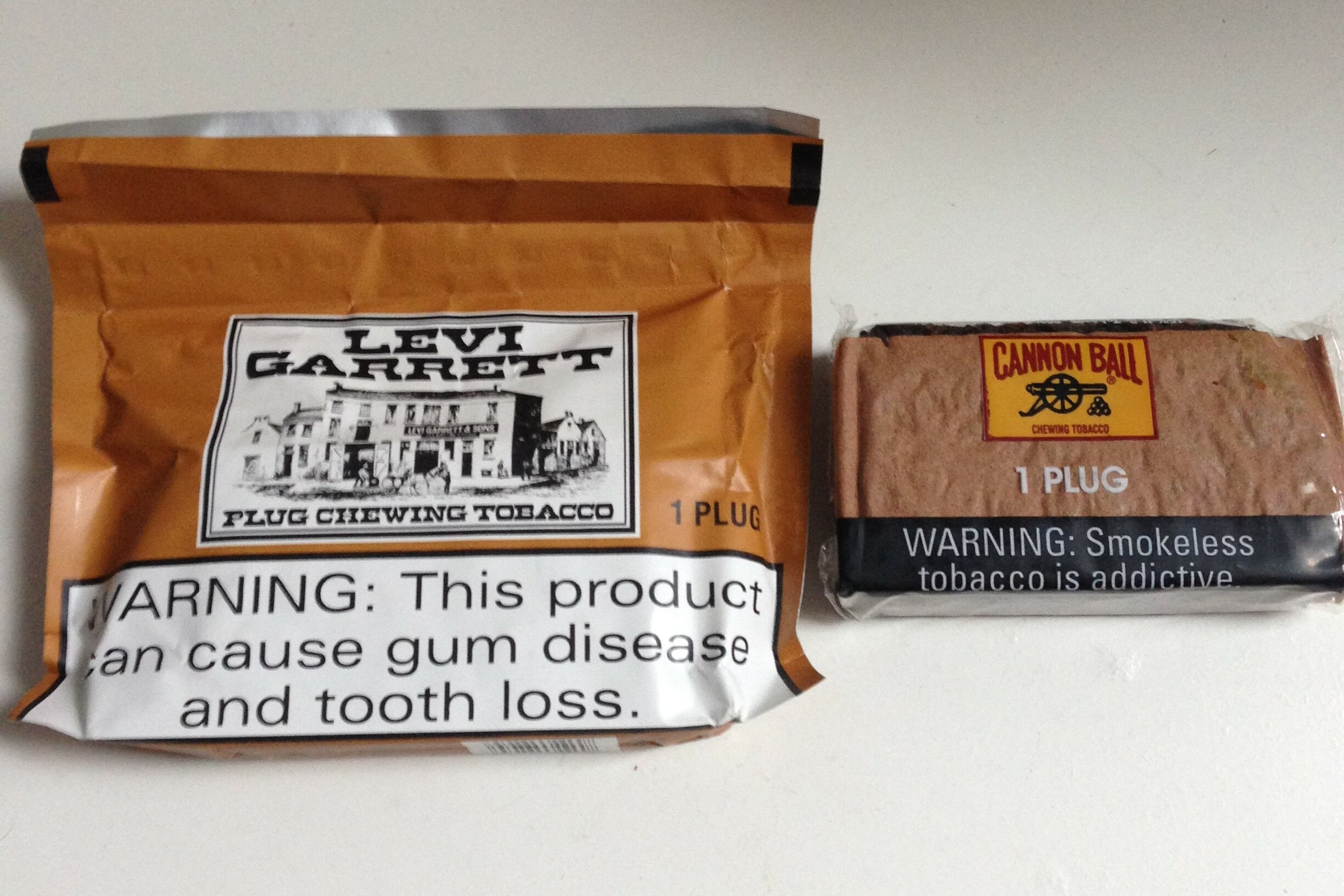
Levi Garrett and Cannon Ball brands of plug chewing tobacco

Plug tobacco is made up of tobacco leaves that have been pressed together and bound by some type of sweetener, resulting in a dense, square tobacco mass. (Some compare the look of plug tobacco to a brownie or similar pastry.) One can then bite directly from the mass or slice the tobacco into portions. Some types of plug may either be chewed or smoked in a tobacco pipe, and some are exclusive to one method of consumption or the other.

Plug tobacco was once a much more common product, available to many American consumers during the 19th century. Two tobacco companies that historically manufactured plug are Liggett and Lorillard. (The latter was known for its Climax brand of plug.)

Modern brands of chewing plug include "rustic" and simple packaging, as is the case with popular plugs like Apple Sun Cured, Brown's Mule, Cannon Ball, Cup, Days Work, and Days O Work. Some well-known loose leaf chewing tobacco brands, such as America's Best Chew and Levi Garrett, also have their own versions of plug tobacco.

Sticks

Chewing tobacco sticks are tightly bound rolls or "sticks" of chewable tobacco, usually sold in pouches. Brands include the German Grimm und Triepel and the Brazilian La Corona.

Twist

Twist or rope tobacco is made up of rope-like strands of tobacco that have been twisted together and cured in that position, afterwards being cut. Some types of twist may either be chewed or smoked in a tobacco pipe, and some are exclusive to one method or the other.

Unlike other types of chewing tobacco, twist tobacco isn't always a sweetened product, and may be devoid of molasses.

Different types of chewing tobacco are endemic to various parts of India and the surrounding regions:

- Indian chewing tobacco

Gutkha

Gutkha (also transliterated gutka) is a chewing tobacco product popular in India and surrounding regions.

It is a mixture of betel nuts, tobacco, paraffin wax, catechu, and slaked lime. It is similar to mava.

Mava

Mava (also transliterated mawa) is a chewing tobacco product popular in Gujarat, India, made with a mixture of betel nut, calcium carbonate and flavoured tobacco. It is also known faki or masala. It is similar to gutkha.

Tambaku paan

Tambaku paan is a type of paan with tobacco. It contains many of the same ingredients as gutkha.

===== Creamy snuff =====
Creamy snuff is a tobacco paste, consisting of tobacco, clove oil, glycerin, spearmint, menthol, and camphor, and sold in a toothpaste tube. It is marketed mainly to women in India, and is known by the brand names Dentobac, Tona, Ganesh. It is locally known as "mishri" in some parts of Maharashtra. According to the U.S. NIH-sponsored 2002 Smokeless Tobacco Fact Sheet. The same factsheet also mentions that it is "often used to clean teeth". The manufacturer recommends letting the paste linger in the mouth before rinsing.

===== Dipping tobacco =====
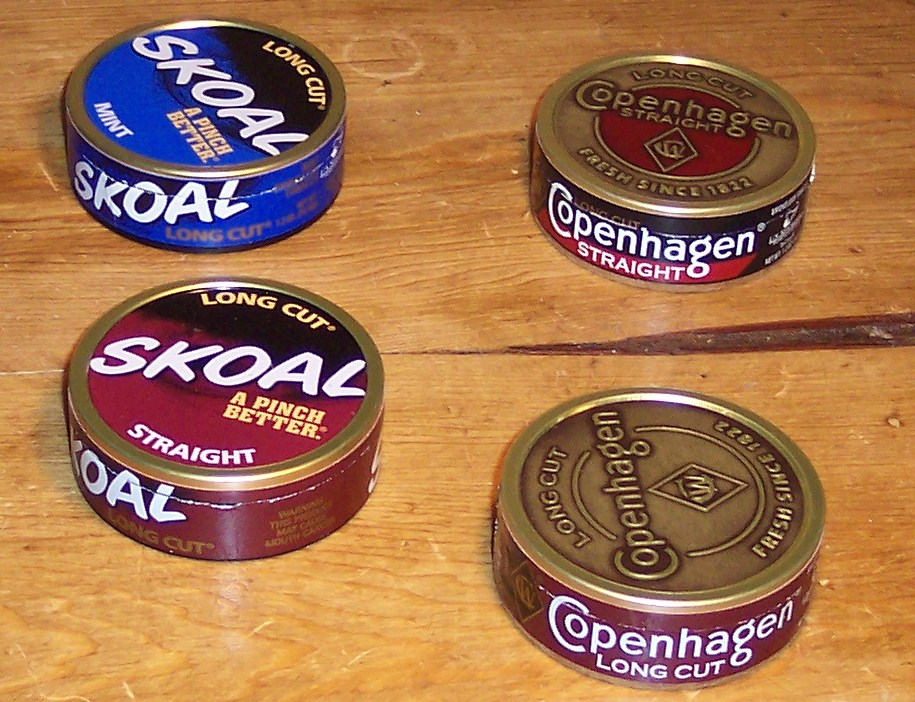
Four cans (or tins) of dipping tobacco/moist snuff

Dipping tobacco, also known as dip, moist snuff (or simply snuff), American moist snuff, or spit tobacco, is a form of smokeless tobacco. Dip is sometimes also called chew or chaw; because of this, it is commonly confused with chewing tobacco. Because it is sometimes called snuff or moist snuff, it can also be confused with nasal or dry snuff.

Instead of literally chewing on dipping tobacco, as is the case with chewing tobacco, a small clump of dip is "pinched" out of its container and placed between the lower or upper lip and gums. While it is most common to place the tobacco between the lower lip and gums, utilizing the upper lip for this purpose—in a manner more common to snus—is known as an "upper decker".

In modern times, dipping tobacco is usually packaged in metal or plastic tins, sometimes with the addition of fiberboard. Some brands are packaged into "tubs", or deeper hand-held containers.

Dipping tobacco comes in several varieties. Many dipping tobacco producers also manufacture pouches of dipping tobacco, making the habit cleaner and more convenient. The following are standard cut sizes, but some brands can still vary in size.

Cut sizes

Extra long cuts are the longest cut size. Copenhagen and Grizzly both make an extra long cut natural variety.

Wide cuts have thicker strands than all other cuts of dipping tobacco. Currently, wide cut is only manufactured by Grizzly.

Long cuts are easier to manage than fine cuts (a smaller granular sized dip - in regard to ease of grabbing the tobacco and keeping it comfortably in mouth). This is the most common cut of tobacco.

Mid cut sized dipping tobacco is comparable to small granules at about 1 mm cubed. A couple of mid cuts were on the smokeless tobacco market but have since been discontinued.

Fine cut comes in granules slightly larger than sand or coffee grounds.

Snuff or simply moist snuff looks similar to dirt or sand in terms of granular size. Extremely small cut.

Pouches hold fine cut tobacco in a small teabag-like pouch for convenience. Pouches are typically about the same size, but one brand, Skoal, also offers a smaller pouch called Bandits.

===== Dissolvable tobacco =====
Dissolvable tobacco is a recent introduction, entering mainstream use in the later half of the 2000s (decade). The product consists of finely processed tobacco which is developed in such a way as to allow the substance to dissolve on the tongue or in the mouth. Camel tobacco is the major purveyor of dissolvable tobacco products, with three varieties, including strips, sticks and orbs, however companies such as Ariva and Stonewall have also been successful with such manufacturing, marketing compressed tobacco lozenges.

===== Gutka =====
Gutka (also spelled gutkha, guttkha, guthka) is a preparation of crushed betel nut, tobacco, and sweet or savory flavorings. It is manufactured in India and exported to a few other countries. A mild stimulant, it is sold across India in small, individual-size packets. It is consumed much like chewing tobacco, and like chewing tobacco it is considered responsible for oral cancer and other severe negative health effects.

Used by millions of adults, it is also marketed to children. Some packaging does not mention tobacco as an ingredient, and some brands are pitched as candies - featuring packaging with children's faces and are brightly colored. Some are chocolate-flavored, and some are marketed as breath fresheners.

===== Iqmik =====
Iqmik is an Alaskan smokeless tobacco product used with punk ash. It is most common among natives. Nicotine is freebased with caustic ash and thus iqmik is more addicting and potent than regular chewing tobacco.

===== Naswar =====
Naswar is a type of smokeless tobacco popular in Afghanistan and surrounding countries. It is moist and powdered, and lime or juniper is added for flavor.

===== Pituri =====
Pituri, also known as mingkulpa is a mixture of leaves and wood ash traditionally chewed as a stimulant (or, after extended use, a depressant) by Aboriginal Australians widely across the continent. Leaves are gathered from any of several species of native tobacco (Nicotiana) or from at least one distinct population of the species Duboisia hopwoodii. Various species of Acacia, Grevillea and Eucalyptus are burned to produce the ash. The term "pituri" may also refer to the plants from which the leaves are gathered or from which the ash is made. Some authors use the term to refer only to the plant Duboisia hopwoodii and its leaves and any chewing mixture containing its leaves.

===== Snus =====
A can (or tin) of Skruf brand loose (Swedish: lös) snus, with some formed into a pris or prilla

Snus is a type of smokeless tobacco originating from and popular in Sweden and other Scandinavian countries. It differs from moist snuff or chewing tobacco in that it is made from steam-cured tobacco leaves, rather than fire-cured ones, and its health effects are markedly different, with epidemiological studies showing lower rates of cancer and other tobacco-related health problems than cigarettes, American "chewing tobacco", Indian gutka or African-type tobacco products. Prominent Swedish brands are Swedish Match, General, Ettan, and Tre Ankare. In many Scandinavian countries, snus comes either in loose powder form, to be pressed into a small ball (called "baking" the snus) by hand or with the use of a special tool, or in small bags (called "portioned snus" form). Both are suitable for placing under one of the lips, most often the upper. Portioned snus is in particular a popular type because it keeps loose tobacco from becoming stuck between the user's teeth; they also produce less spittle when in contact with mucous membranes inside the mouth which extends the usage time of the tobacco product. However, loose form snus tends to deliver more nicotine than portioned form.

===== Tobacco edibles =====
Tobacco gum, like dissolvable tobacco, is a recent introduction - a type of chewing gum which, like nicotine gum provides nicotine through oral absorption. However, the difference between nicotine gum and tobacco gum is that tobacco gum is made from finely powdered tobacco mixed with a gum base, rather than freebase nicotine.

== Non-consumable ==
=== Tobacco water ===
Tobacco water is a traditional organic insecticide used in domestic gardening. Tobacco dust can be used similarly. It is produced by boiling strong tobacco in water, or by steeping the tobacco in water for a longer period. When cooled the mixture can be applied as a spray, or 'painted' on to the leaves of garden plants, where it will prove deadly to insects.

Basque angulero fishermen kill immature eels (elvers) in an infusion of tobacco leaves before parboiling them in salty water for transportation to market as angulas, a seasonal delicacy.

=== Topical tobacco paste ===
Topical tobacco paste is a home remedy sometimes recommended as a treatment for wasp, hornet, fire ant, scorpion, and bee stings. An amount equivalent to the contents of a cigarette is mashed in a cup with about a 0.5 to 1 teaspoon of water to make a paste that is then applied to the affected area. Paste has a diameter of 4 to 5 cm (1.5 to 2 in) and may need to be moistened in dry weather. If made and applied immediately, complete remission is common within 20–30 minutes, at which point the paste can be removed. The next day there may be some residual itching, but virtually no swelling or redness. There is no scientific evidence that this common home remedy works to relieve pain. For about 2 percent of people, allergic reactions can be life-threatening and require emergency treatment.

== By country ==
The Tobacco Products Directive of the European Union require manufacturers of tobacco and vaping products to declare information of their products before placing them on the market.

In 12 countries of the European Union in 2019, 39,000 tobacco products were notified. It included 17,000 cigars (43%), 11,000 cigarettes (29%) and 3,300 hookahs (8%).

=== France ===
In France, the ANSES analysed the products notified between 2019 and 2020. They found 3,200 tobacco products (mainly cigarettes, cigars and cigarillos) and 34,000 vaping products (predominantly electronic cigarette liquids) declared for the French market.

More than 850 additives were listed for tobacco products and nearly 1,200 for vaping products. Most of those additives were used to enhance flavour. By masking the naturally harsh taste of tobacco, flavours make it easier for people to take up smoking.

=== Switzerland ===
In Switzerland, 9,900 products were notified as of 2026 on Tabacinfo.ch. They comprised 5,000 electronic cigarettes, 4,000 smoking tobacco products (including 3,000 cigars) and 900 others (cannabis products, heated tobacco products, snus and nicotine pouches).

== See also ==
- Chop chop (tobacco)
- Tobacco Products Directive (European Union)
- Tobacco industry
