= Mava =

MAVA may refer to:

- MAVA-Renault, a Greek company
- Men Against Violence and Abuse, an Indian organisation
- Multiple abstract variance analysis, a technique in statistics
- Mava (tobacco), a form of chewing tobacco

Mava (Persian: ماوا) may refer to the following villages in Iran:

- Mava, Chenaran, in Razavi Khorasan Province
- Mava, Nishapur, in Razavi Khorasan Province
- Mava, Hamadan
- Mava, Kermanshah (disambiguation)
- Mava, Khuzestan (disambiguation)

== People with the name ==
- Mava Lee Thomas (1929–2013), American baseball player

== See also ==
- Mawa (disambiguation)
- MEWA (disambiguation)
- Mewa or Khoa, a milk product of India
