= Mavai =

Mavai (Persian: ماواي) may refer to:

== Places in Iran ==
- Mavai-ye Olya
- Mavai-ye Sofla (disambiguation)
- Mavai-ye Vasat

== People ==
- Mavai Senathirajah (1942–2025), Sri Lankan politician
- Rakesh Mavai, Indian politician
