= MEWA =

MEWA may refer to

- MEWA Textil-Management AG, a German textile services company
- Multiple employer welfare arrangement, a system where a group of employers join together to offer employee benefits for all of their employees
- Mewa or khoa, a milk product in India
- Commins Mewa (born 1965), Solomon Islands politician

== See also ==
- Mawa (disambiguation)
- Mava (disambiguation)
