= Mava, Kermanshah =

Mava (Persian: ماوا) in Kermanshah Province may refer to:

- Mava-ye Olya
- Mava-ye Sofla
