= Maveh =

Maveh (Persian: موه or ماوه) may refer to:

- Maveh, Andimeshk (موه)
- Maveh, Izeh (ماوه - Māveh)
