= Herbal tobacco =

Herbal tobacco may refer to:

- Herbal cigarettes
- Herbal smokeless tobacco
