= Vadaperumbakkam =

Vadaperumbakkam வடபெரும்பாக்கம்
- Neighbourhood
- Location within Chennai Location within Tamil Nadu Location within India
- Coordinates: 13.179866°N 80.218306°E
- Country: India
- State: Tamil Nadu
- District: Chennai
- Metro: Chennai
- Elevation: 10 m (33 ft)

Languages
  - Official: Tamil
- Time zone: UTC+5:30 (IST)
- PIN: 600060
- Telephone code: 044
- Vehicle registration: TN-20-xxxx & TN-18-xxxx(new)
- Planning agency: CMDA
- City: Chennai
- Lok Sabha constituency: Tiruvallur
- Vidhan Sabha constituency: Madhavaram

Vadaperumbakkam (Tamil: வடபெரும்பாக்கம்), is a residential area in North Chennai, a metropolitan city in Tamil Nadu, India. On 2011, Vadaperumbakkam Merged with Chennai Corporation.

== Surroundings ==
Vadaperumbakkam was an agricultural village before the year 2000. After 2005, the industrial and Godown development started and developed quickly. On 2011, Vaperumbakkam merged with Chennai Corporation (City Limit) due to its fast development. It is surrounded by Madhavaram, Puzhal and Perambur. It is an industrial area as the vicinity is mostly of godowns and industries. However it yet to be declared as one.

In 2017 it was discovered that a former health minister of Vaperumbakkam was involved in covering up the illegal production of gutka in Chennai.
