= Mavai-ye Sofla =

Mavai-ye Sofla (Persian: ماواي سفلي) may refer to:

- Mavai-ye Sofla, Kerman
- Mavai-ye Sofla, Kermanshah
