= Tobacco use in Nepal =

Tobacco use in Nepal is a common practice. Smoking cigarettes is the most common mode of tobacco use in Nepal. Tobacco is attributed to cause over 27000 annual deaths in Nepal.

== Background ==
Both smoking and the use of smokeless tobacco are common practices in Nepal with 28.3% of adults consuming some form of tobacco in Nepal. Out of smokeless tobacco, chewing tobacco is the most common form of tobacco use Beedi use is also common among Nepalese women. The Act against Tobacco was established in 2011, which prohibits the sale of tobacco use to minors and pregnant women.

== Prevalence of tobacco use ==
48.3% of males and 11.6% of female adults consumed some form of tobacco in 2019. Cigarettes are the most common form of tobacco used by both sexes, while adults use less beedi compared to females. Chewing tobacco is more common than the use of Gutka in Nepal .

== Smoking in Nepal ==
In 2019, 28.9% of adults (aged 15–69 years) used either smoked or smokeless tobacco products. In the entire population, 17.1% of Nepalese smoked in 2019, with 22% male and 6% female. The average age for initiation of smoking is 17.8 years, with 17.7 for men and 18.4 for female.

== Legislation ==
Smoking is prohibited in public transportation, educational institutions, hospitals, restaurants, government offices, and other public places as per the Tobacco Act 2011. The sale of cigarettes to minors and pregnant women is a punishable offence in Nepal, along with the act of smoking in the above-mentioned public places. The advertisement of tobacco products is also prohibited. Recently, the decision to ban the sale of tobacco in Kathmandu Metropolitan City was reverted by Patan High Court.

== Graphics warning ==
In 2015, Nepal implemented the world's largest graphic warning on cigarette packets, which kept around 90% of the area covered with graphics and warning message.

== Anti-Smoking Campaign ==
Smokers are not selfish anti-smoking campaign was initiated by Dr. Om Foundation from February 1 to February 14, 2024., culminating on valentine's day with aim to make meaningful sacrifices for loved ones by quitting habits of smoking and other tobacco products. In this campaign over 1600 individuals pledged to quit smoking.

== Companies ==
There are 12 officially registered tobacco companies in Nepal. Surya Tobacco Company is the largest cigarette manufacturer in Nepal.
