= Mava (tobacco) =

Form of smokeless chewing tobacco

Mava, also known as Maava or Mawa (Hindi: मावा), is a form of smokeless tobacco that combines tobacco with ingredients like betel nut and lime. Studies indicate that it is one of the most dangerous forms of chewing tobacco.

It comprises approximately 95% areca nut by weight and is chewed for 10–20 minutes when placed in the mouth. Mava finds usage in South Asia, notably in the Indian Subcontinent, and is popular in the Indian states of Gujarat, Maharashtra, as well as in Bangladesh and Pakistan.

== Usage ==
Mawa comprises areca nut shavings (5-6 g), tobacco (about 0.3 g), and watery slaked lime. Users vigorously rub the mixture for homogeneity, remove any coarse tobacco pieces, and chew it until soft. They then transfer it to the mandibular groove, sucking for ten to twenty minutes. A variant utilized in Gujarat, referred to as meetha mawa, incorporates thin shavings of areca nut, grated coconut, dried fruits, and sweeteners.

=== Meetha Mawa ===
Meetha Mawa, meaning sweet mawa, is a sweet variant of mawa, made from thin shavings of areca nut, grated coconut, dried fruits, and various sweetening agents. Commonly used in Gujarat, similar preparations with distinct names are popular in various regions.

== Research ==
According to Dr. E Vidhubala, an assistant professor of psycho-oncology heading the Tobacco Cessation Centre at the Cancer Institute in Adyar, Mawa contains 3,000 toxins, including 200 cancer-causing substances like powdered tobacco leaves, ammonia, ethanol, acetone, phenols, stearic acid, naphthalene, vinyl chloride, arsenic, formalin, nicotine, hydrogen cyanide, Nitrobenzene, acetic acid, toluene, methane, cadmium, DDT/dieldrin, and hexamine.

A laboratory study conducted at the University of Minnesota, USA, in collaboration with the Healis-Sekhsaria Institute of Public Health, Navi Mumbai, found high levels of cancer-causing chemicals in Mawa.

According to a report published by the Indian government, the practice of chewing mawa has gained high popularity among young men aged 15–35 years.

== Ban ==
In 2013, the Government of Karnataka implemented a ban on the tobacco product Gutka, subsequently leading to an increased demand for Mawa. The Government of Maharashtra has banned the sale of manufactured chewing tobacco, including Mawa in July 2015. Mawa is prohibited in Pakistan.

The Greater Chennai Police confiscated over 30 kg of banned tobacco, including 22 kg of gutkha and 9 kg of Mawa in February 2023.

== See also ==
- List of tobacco products
