= Mawa =

Mawa or MAWA may refer to:

- Mentoring Artists for Women's Art, a feminist visual arts education center in Winnipeg, Manitoba, Canada
- Middle Atlantic Writers Association
- Mawa clawed frog, a species of frog endemic to Cameroon
- Mawa Cantonment, a military cantonment in Dhaka Division, Bangladesh
- Mawa Gare, a village and former railway station in the Democratic Republic of the Congo
- Orang Mawas, a proposed hominid cryptid reported to inhabit the jungle of Johor in Malaysia
- Mawa language (Chad),
- Mawa language (Nigeria), an unclassified language
- Khoa, or mawa, a milk product in the cuisines of the Indian subcontinent
- Mawa kaJama (1770s–1848), a Zulu princess

== See also ==
- Mava (disambiguation)
- MEWA (disambiguation)
