= Mewa Arena =

Stadium in Mainz, Rhineland-Palatinate, Germany

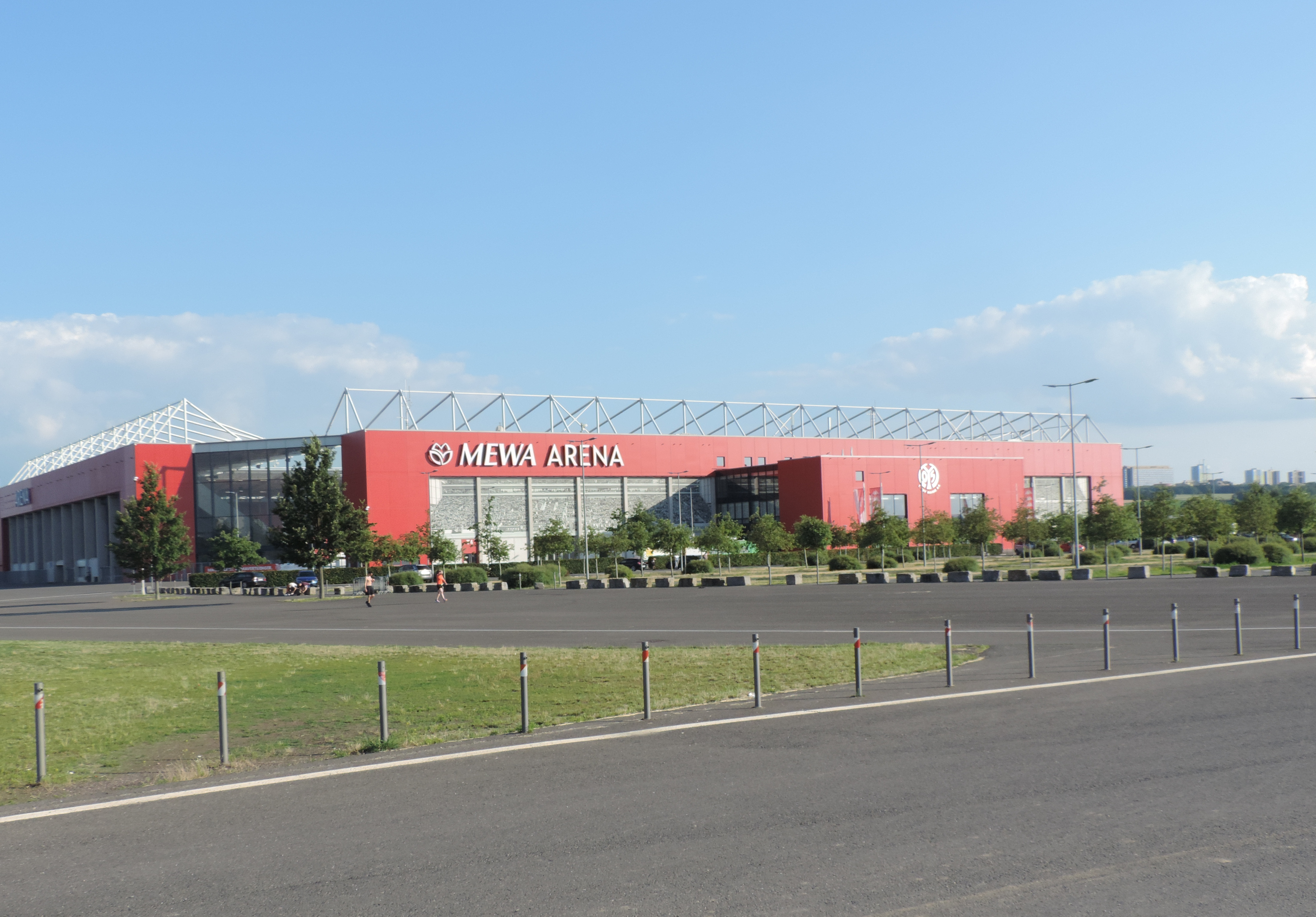
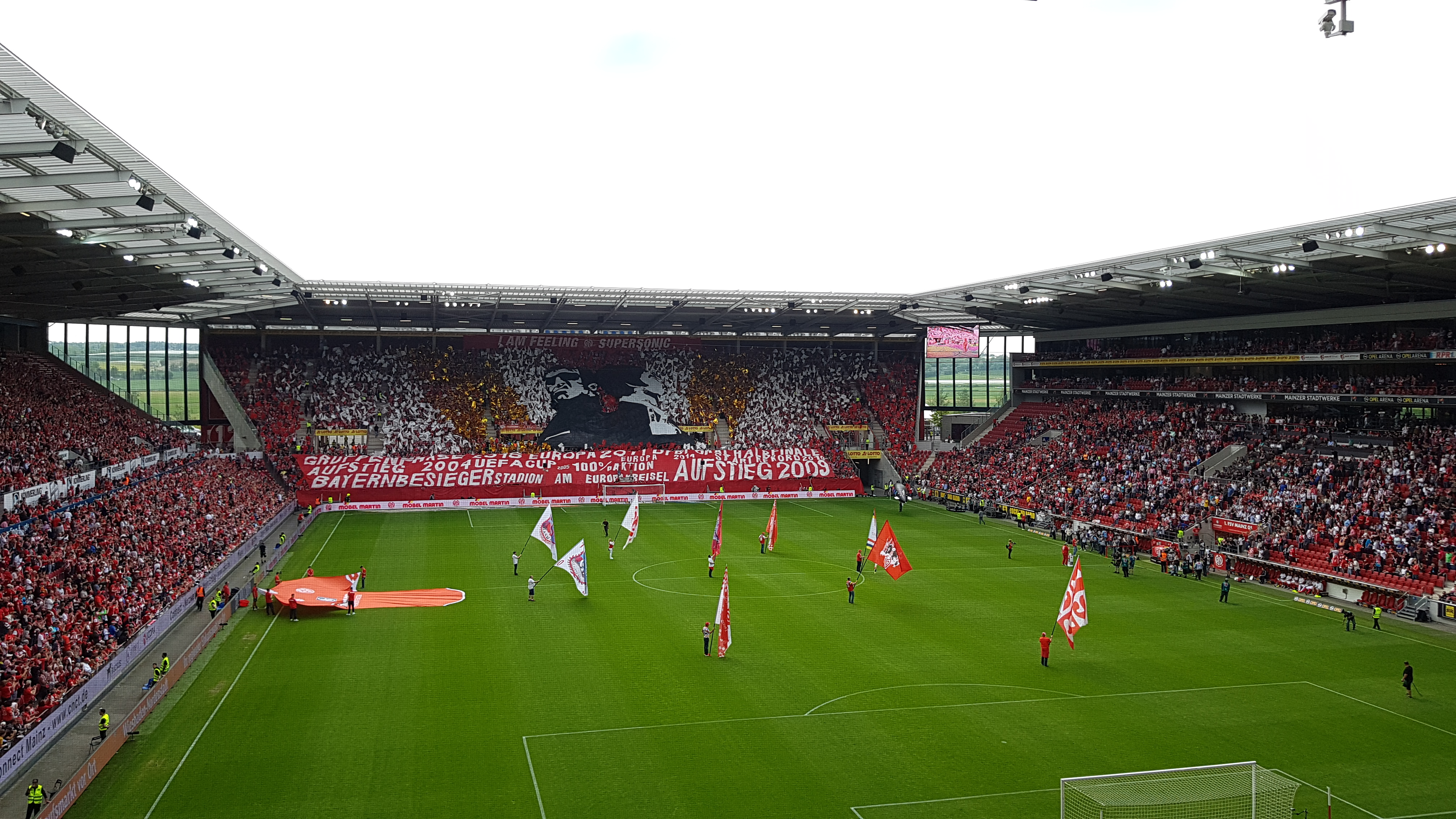
- Interactive map of Mewa Arena
- Former names: Coface Arena (2011–2016); Opel Arena (2016–2021)
- Location: Mainz, Rhineland-Palatinate, Germany
- Coordinates: 49°59′3″N 8°13′27″E
- Owner: Grundstücksverwaltungsgesellschaft der Stadt Mainz mbH (GVG)
- Operator: 1. FSV Mainz 05 e.V.
- Capacity: 34,000 (League Matches), 27,000 (International Matches)
- Executive suites: 35
- Surface: Grass

Construction
- Groundbreaking: 5 May 2009
- Opened: 3 July 2011
- Cost: € 60 million
- Architects: Dr. Axel Nixdorf, agn Niederberghaus & Partner
- Project manager: hbm Stadien- und Sportstättenbau GmbH
- Main contractor: Grundstückverwaltungsgesellschaft Mainz GmbH

Tenants
- Mainz 05 (2011–present); Germany national football team (selected matches)

Mewa Arena (German pronunciation: [ˈmeːvaː ʔaˌʁeːnaː]; stylised as MEWA ARENA; also known as the 1. FSV Mainz 05 Arena due to UEFA sponsorship regulations) is a multi-purpose stadium in Mainz, Rhineland-Palatinate, Germany, that opened in July 2011. It is used for football matches, and hosts the home matches of the German Bundesliga side Mainz 05.

The stadium has a capacity of 34,034, 19,700 seated, and replaced the Bruchwegstadion. The stadium was originally named Coface Arena ([ˈkoːfas ʔaˌʁeːna]) after a sponsorship deal with COFACE. From May 2016 to June 2021 the stadium was known as Opel Arena ([ˈoːpl̩ ʔaˌʁeːnaː]) per a naming rights agreement with Opel.

The stadium adopted its current name in July 2021 following a sponsorship agreement with the MEWA Textil-Service, a German linen rental company.

== Opening ==
To celebrate the opening, FSV Mainz 05 hosted the Ligatotal! Cup 2011, a pre-season tournament with champions Borussia Dortmund, Hamburger SV and Bayern Munich. Borussia Dortmund won the tournament with FSV Mainz 05 finishing last after losing to Bayern Munich in the third-place play-off.

The first league goal scored in the new arena was scored by Tunisian International Sami Allagui for FSV Mainz 05 against Bayer Leverkusen on 7 August 2011.

== Gallery ==
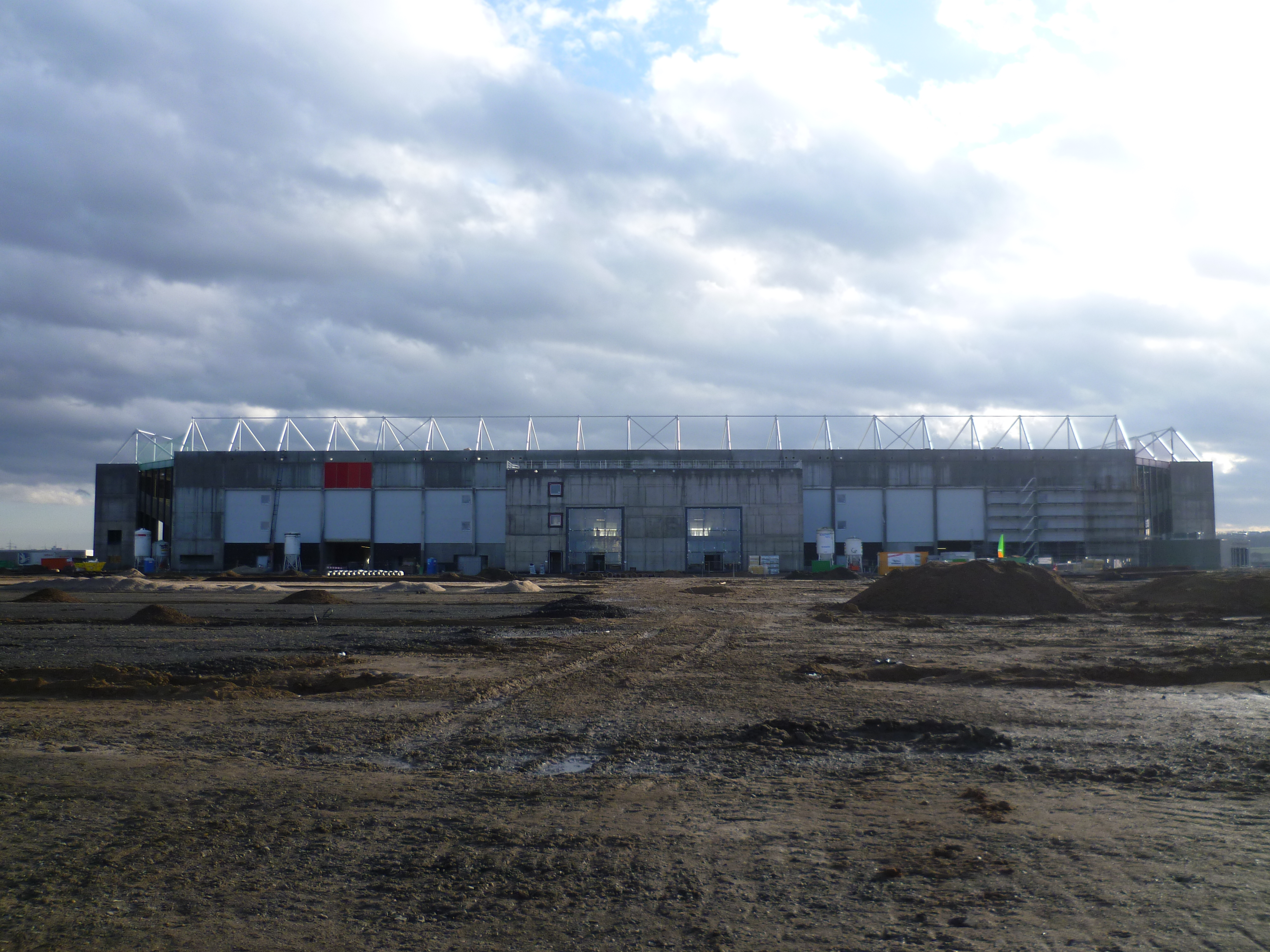

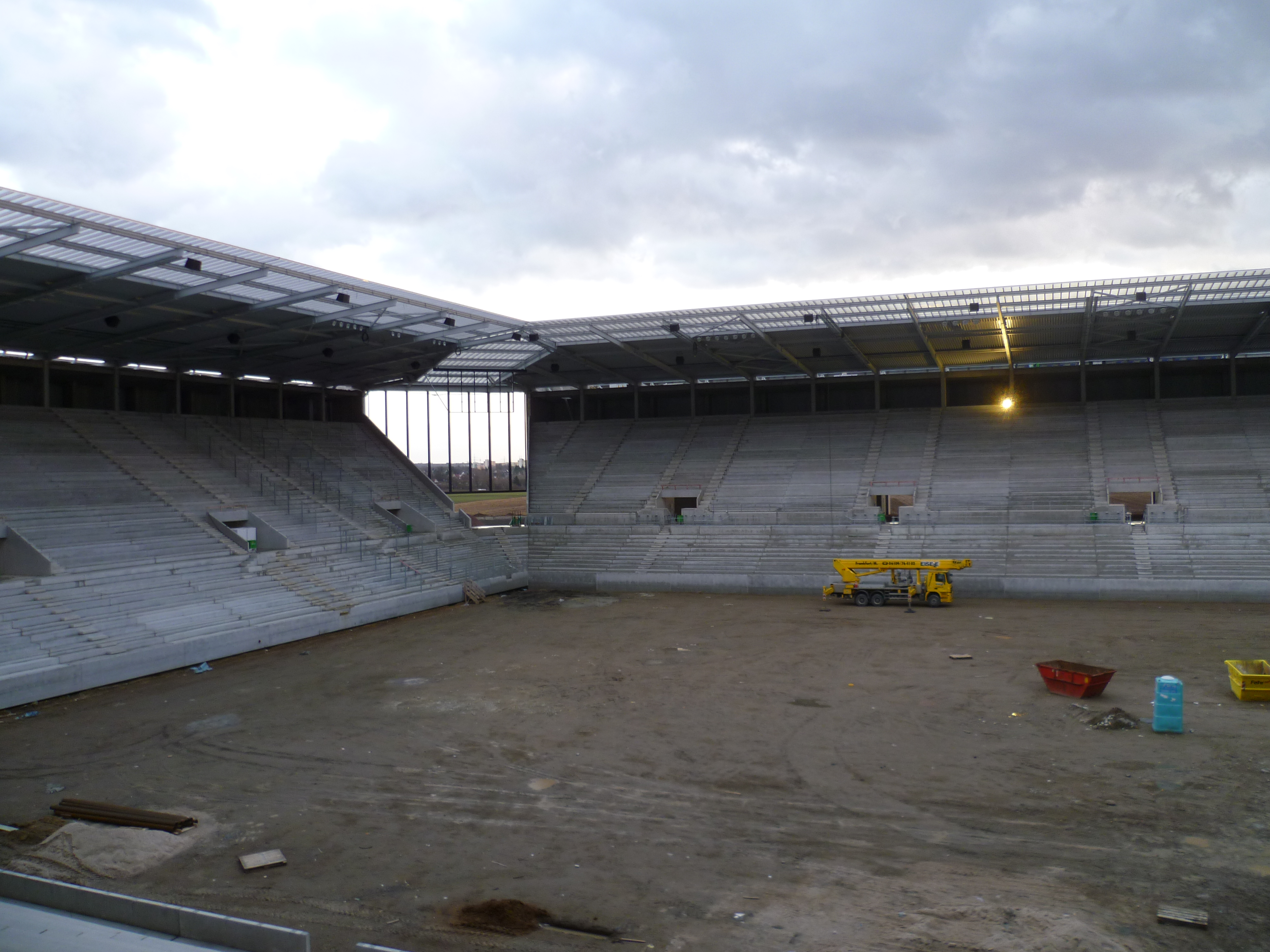

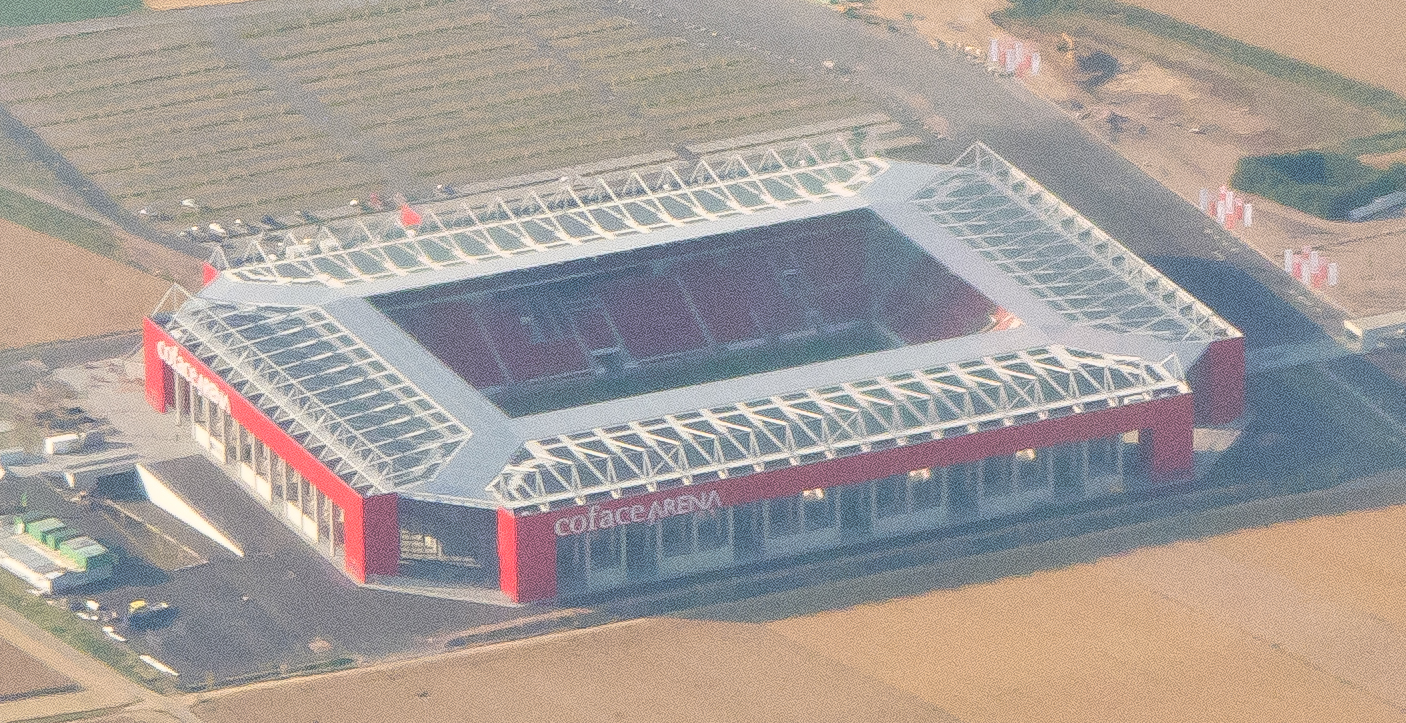

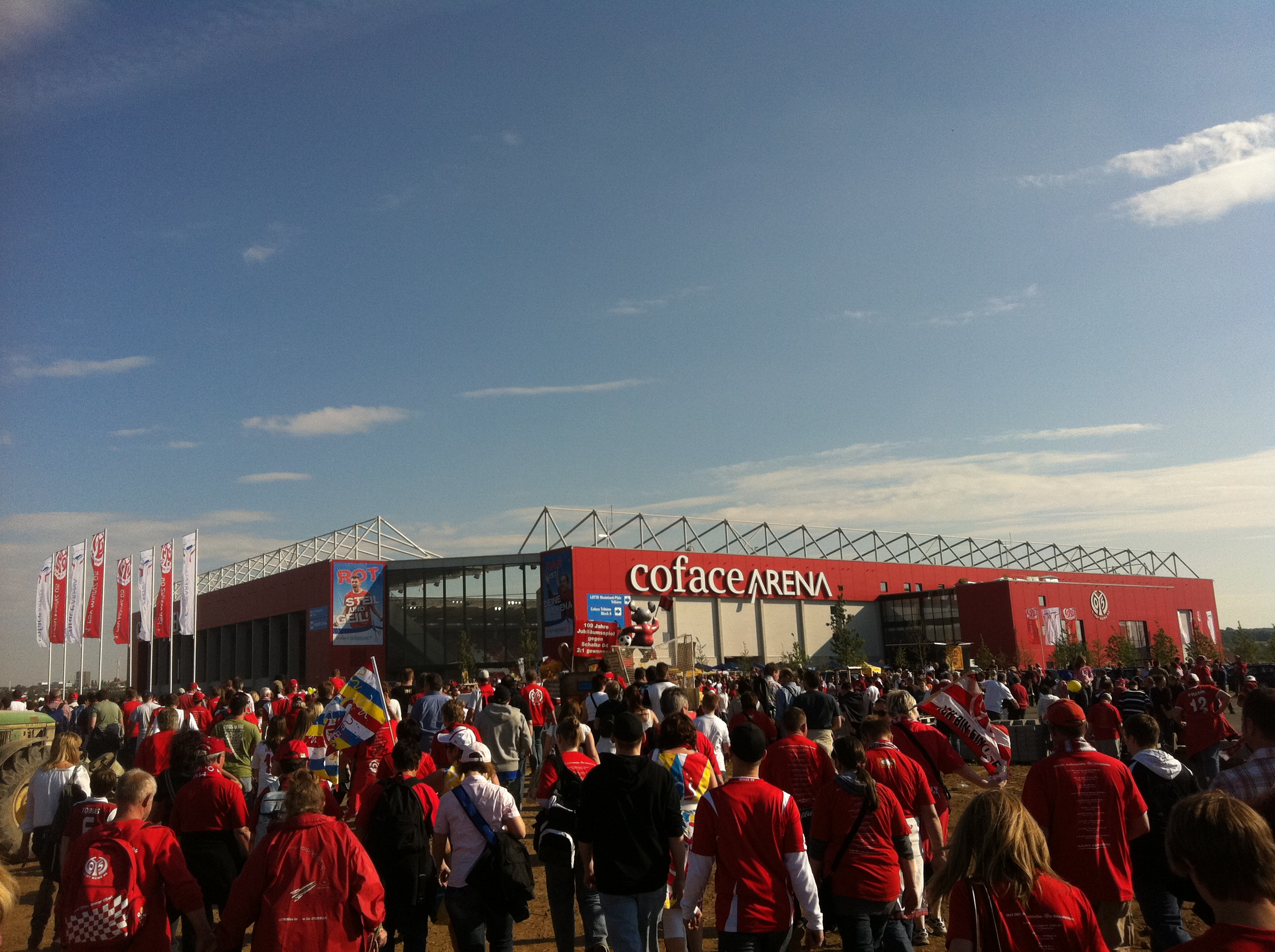
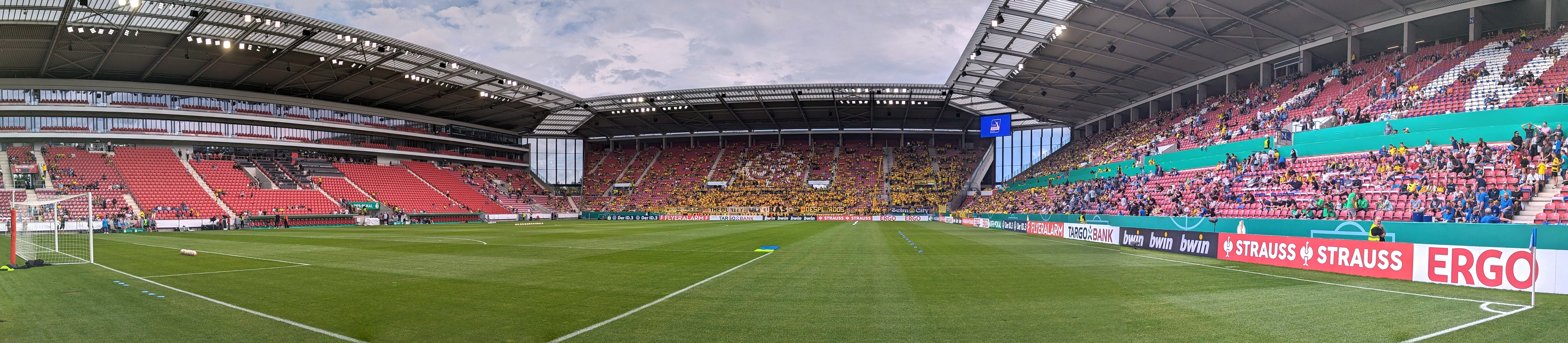
Mewa Arena (panorama)

== Milestone matches ==
7 August 2011	(Germany) Mainz 05	2–0	Bayer Leverkusen (Germany)	2011–12 Bundesliga; First Bundesliga Match
15:30 CEST	Allagui 32'; Toprak 86' (o.g.)			Attendance: 33,500; Referee: Michael Weiner
