= MEWA Textil-Service =

MEWA Textil-Service AG & Co. Management OHG
- Company type: Private
- Industry: Textile rental service
- Headquarters: Wiesbaden, Germany
- Number of employees: 4115
- Website: www.mewa.de

MEWA Textil-Service is a business group in the Textile Service sector (textile rental) with 43 locations in Germany, and other European countries. The head office is based in Wiesbaden.

The company has the naming rights for the Mewa Arena, a multi-use stadium in Mainz, Germany.
