= Smoking in Iran =

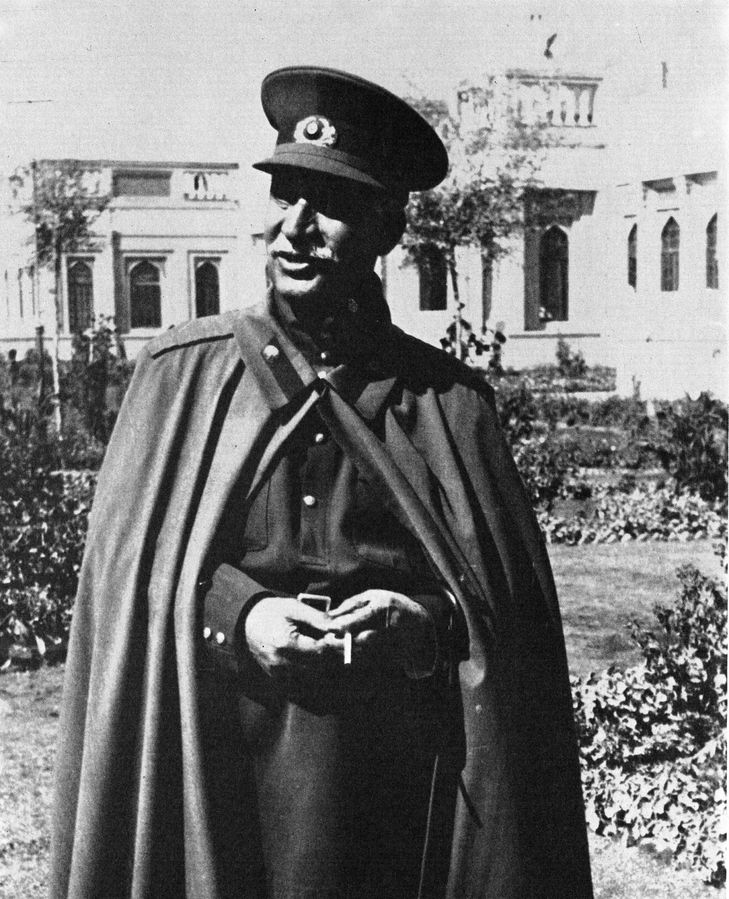
Reza Shah King of Iran, 1937

Smoking in Iran (Note: Persian: سیگار کشیدن در ایران, romanized: Sigâre kašidan dar Irân) has been banned in all public places since 2007. This includes all state bodies, hotels. A smoking ban for all car drivers nationwide was implemented in March 2006, and although offenders can face fines, the ban has been widely ignored. The sale of tobacco products to anyone under the age of 18 is prohibited and is punishable by the confiscation of the vendor's tobacco products and a fine.

About 20% of the adult male and 4.5% of the adult female population smoke tobacco (12 million smokers according to some estimates). 60,000 Iranians die directly or indirectly due to smoking every year (2008). Smoking is responsible for 25% of deaths in the country. Approx. 54-60 billion cigarettes are believed to be consumed annually in Iran.

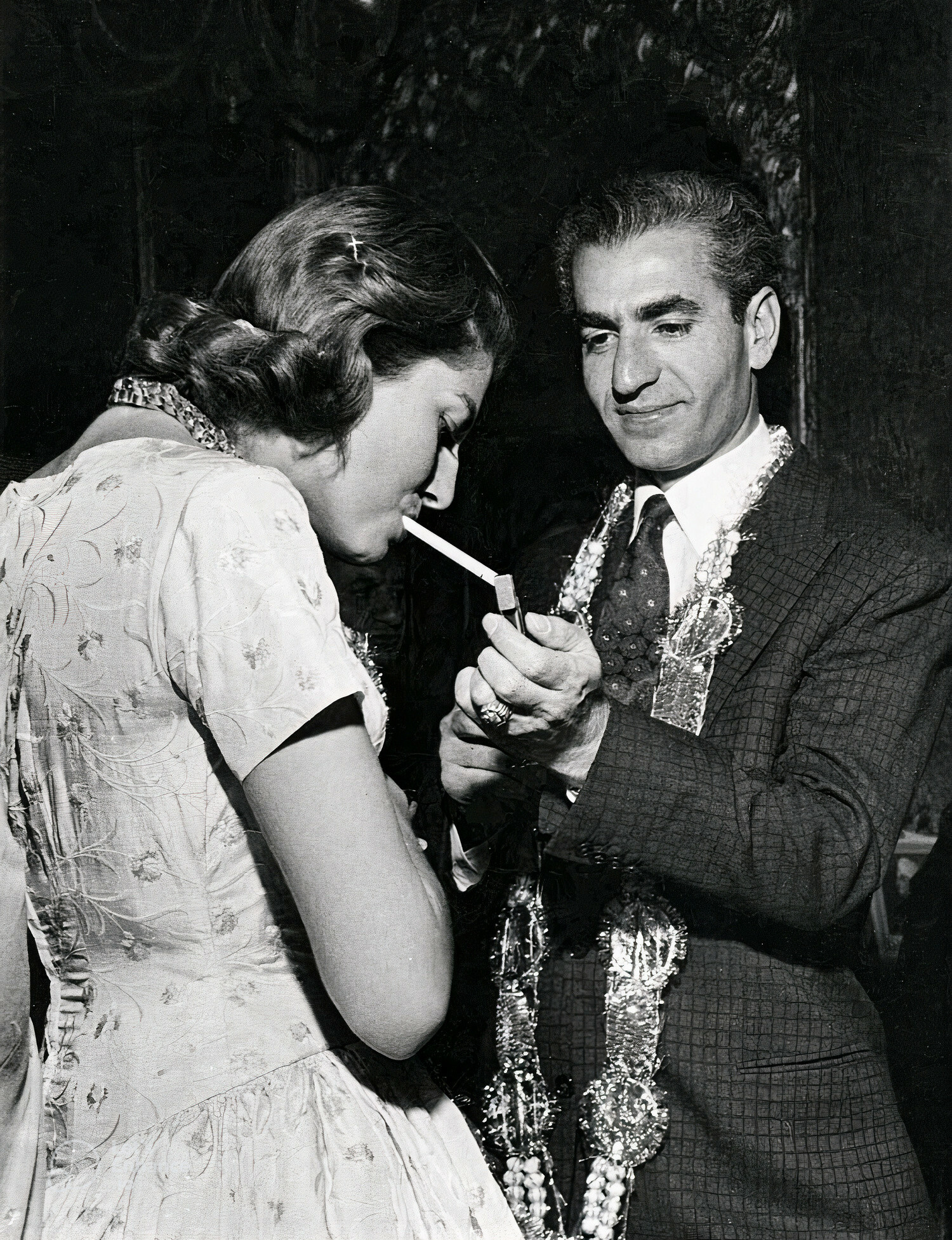
Mohammad Reza Pahlavi of Iran, 1950s

Around 2.7 billion cigarettes are smuggled into Iran annually, according to officials from the state-owned Iranian Tobacco Company (ITC), on top of another 26.7 billion which are imported legally (2008). Imports of cigarettes, tobacco, cigars, cigarette paper, cigarette tips are subject to government monopoly. Iranians spend more than $1.8 billion a year on tobacco.

According to a 2010 law, smokers will not be appointed to senior government jobs. Despite this, former supreme leader Ali Khamenei was a smoker from his early days.

== See also ==
- Health in Iran
