= Multiple abstract variance analysis =

Statistical technique

Multiple abstract variance analysis (MAVA), is a statistical technique used to estimate the proportion of variance in a phenotypic trait due to genetic and environmental factors. It was developed by psychologist Raymond B. Cattell in order to enable the analysis of data from multiple independent sources to estimate the causes of trait variation. Cattell originally described the technique in a 1960 paper. MAVA aims to estimate the relative genetic and environmental contributions to trait variation by comparing variances between families to those within families on the trait under study. As such, it is considered a "more systematic and comprehensive approach" than the classical correlation method of heritability estimation. MAVA later formed the basis of Cattell's 16PF Questionnaire.

MAVA has been criticized for inconsistencies between some of the mathematical equations used in the method, and for introducing "...numerous new theoretical constructs without any clear empirical basis". Critics of the method have also noted that it requires the introduction of additional parameters whenever a new type of genetic relationship is considered, which precludes a complete analysis of the causes of trait variation.
