= Mavai-ye Sofla, Kerman =

Mavai-ye Sofla ماواي سفلي
- Village
- Country: Iran
- Province: Kerman
- County: Shahr-e Babak
- Bakhsh: Dehaj
- Rural District: Dehaj

Population (2006)
  - Total: 46
- Time zone: UTC+3:30 (IRST)
  - Summer (DST): UTC+4:30 (IRDT)

Mavai-ye Sofla (Persian: ماواي سفلي, also Romanized as Māvāī-ye Soflá) is a village in Dehaj Rural District, Dehaj District, Shahr-e Babak County, Kerman Province, Iran. At the 2006 census, its population was 46, in 16 families.
