= Muri, Razavi Khorasan =

Muri موري
- Village
- Location within Iran
- Coordinates: 36°09′20″N 58°53′12″E
- Country: Iran
- Province: Razavi Khorasan
- County: Nishapur
- Bakhsh: Central
- Rural District: Fazl

Population (2006)
  - Total: 44
- Time zone: UTC+3:30 (IRST)
  - Summer (DST): UTC+4:30 (IRDT)

Muri (Persian: موري, also Romanized as Mūrī; also known as Ma’vī and Ma’vá) is a village in Fazl Rural District, in the Central District of Nishapur County, Razavi Khorasan Province, Iran. At the 2006 census, its population was 44, in 14 families.
