= Maveh, Izeh =

Maveh ماوه
- Village
- Location within Iran
- Coordinates: 32°12′51″N 49°47′15″E
- Country: Iran
- Province: Khuzestan
- County: Izeh
- Bakhsh: Central
- Rural District: Pian

Population (2006)
  - Total: 74
- Time zone: UTC+3:30 (IRST)
  - Summer (DST): UTC+4:30 (IRDT)

Maveh (Persian: ماوه, also Romanized as Māveh) is a village in Pian Rural District, in the Central District of Izeh County, Khuzestan Province, Iran. At the 2006 census, its population was 74, in 14 families.
