= Herbal cigarette =

Cigarette containing herbs in lieu of tobacco

A herbal cigarette (also called a tobacco-free cigarette or nicotine-free cigarette) is a cigarette that usually does not contain any tobacco or nicotine, instead being composed of a mixture of various herbs and/or other plant material. However, Chinese herbal cigarettes contain tobacco and nicotine with herbs added, unlike European and North American herbal cigarettes which have tobacco and nicotine omitted. Like herbal smokeless tobacco, they are often used as a substitute for standard tobacco products (primarily cigarettes). Herbal cigarettes are often advertised as a smoking cessation aid. They are also used in acting scenes by performers who are non-smokers, or where anti-smoking legislation prohibits the use of tobacco in public spaces. Herbal cigarettes can carry carcinogens.

== Construction ==
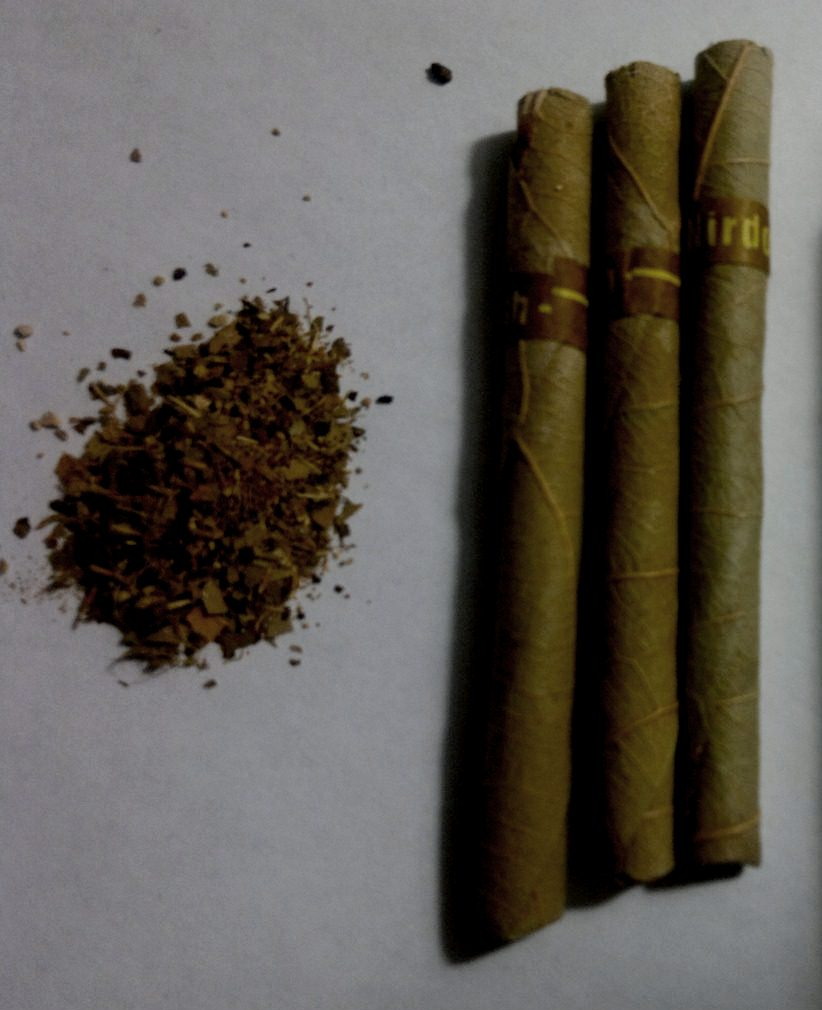
Nirdosh herb, Herbal Dhoompan cigarettes

=== Paper and filter ===
Herbal cigarettes are most often made using standard-issue rolling papers and cigarette filters, bundled together.

=== Herbal blend ===
A wide range of consumable products may be used as a filling, in lieu of tobacco. Corn silk and a number of flavorful herbs, such as mint, cinnamon or lemongrass, have been utilized by a wide number of herbal cigarette producers. Other manufacturers have included non-herbs like rose petals or clover leaves. Some use the flavorless bagasse and make the herbal cigarette depend on the flavoring; this is especially common in shisha. Some are made with dried lettuce leaves or shredded cabbage leaves.

=== Toxic chemicals ===
Detailed below are some of the harmful substances found in herbal cigarettes:

- Tar: The tar level was found at 5.5 mg/cig, which was higher than the package indicated. In South Korea, a study found that tar levels were higher than the tolerance range set by the South Korean tobacco business law. Chinese herbal cigarettes were found to have the same amount of tar as regular cigarettes.
- Carbon monoxide (CO): In a South Korean study there was carbon monoxide detected at 12.30 ± 0.30 mg/cig. Vegetable-based herbal cigarettes can produce carbon monoxide equivalent to regular cigarettes.
- Aromatic amines: 4-aminobiphenyl, a group 1 carcinogen, was marginally higher in herbal cigarettes than in regular cigarettes and 1-aminonaphthalene, 2-aminonaphthalene, and 3-aminobiphenyl was lower in herbal cigarettes than in regular cigarettes.
- Smoke condensate: The mutagenic aspect of the smoke condensate of herbal cigarettes is similar to regular cigarettes.

== Health effects ==
Research shows that herbal cigarettes compared with regular cigarettes can be just as harmful in terms of the carcinogens they contain. Dr. John Moore-Gillan, chairman of the British Lung Foundation, states the addictive qualities to herbal cigarettes may be taken out, however other harmful elements remain. A study on Chinese herbal cigarettes found they had about the same amount of carcinogens as regular cigarettes. There are toxic components of the smoke of herbal cigarettes which are similar to regular cigarettes. Aminobiphenyl can cause bladder cancer. CO can be fatal in "high concentration of approximately 667 μg/mL." CO can cause coronary artery disease as well. Short term symptoms of CO include headaches, dizziness, irritability and difficulty breathing.

== Around the world ==
=== China ===
The Chinese tobacco industry markets herbal cigarettes as having health benefits, yet scientific studies show there is no difference to peoples' health between Chinese herbal cigarette brands and regular cigarette brands. Chinese cigarette brands are equally as addictive as regular cigarettes, although they are marketed as healthier. Chinese herbal cigarettes are sold in Philippines, Singapore, Indonesia, Malaysia, Cambodia, Myanmar, Canada, and Taiwan. People observed in a study smoked a similar number of herbal cigarettes versus regular cigarettes. Herbal cigarettes started in the 1970s and became popular in the 1990s. Two of the biggest herbal brands in China, Jinsheng and Wuyeshen, sold 20 billion cigarettes, or 1%, of all cigarettes sold in China in 2008.

=== South Korea ===
In South Korea regular cigarette prices have risen making herbal cigarettes a more popular smoking alternative. Evidence shows that South Koreans choose to use herbal cigarettes as a smoking cessation aid. Sales of herbal cigarettes increased by 118% in 2014.

=== United States ===
A study investigated smokers' perception on cigarette products thought of as "less harmful" than regular cigarettes. It found that 3.3% of respondents could name a brand of herbal cigarettes, which was higher than the 2.4% who could name a brand of nicotine replacement therapy.

== See also ==
- Cigarettes
- Herbal smokeless tobacco
- Smoking cessation
