= Herbal smokeless tobacco =

Herbal imitation tobacco products

Herbal smokeless tobacco is any product that imitates types of smokeless tobacco (chewing tobacco, dipping tobacco, snuff, snus, etc.) but does not contain tobacco and nicotine, or may contain nicotine without tobacco. Like herbal cigarettes and electronic cigarettes, they are often used as a tobacco cessation aid. Herbal smokeless tobacco use is an alternative to using smokeless tobacco that may help users quit.

== Sub-types ==
=== Herbal snus ===
Herbal snus is a tobacco-free and nicotine-free substitute of snus, a spitless tobacco of either loose or pouched (portioned) form which is usually placed along the gum line beneath the upper lip. It is most widely used in Sweden. Forms of herbal snus from other countries include Makla, a chewing variant from Morocco as well as the Turkish variant Maraş otu (English: Maraş weed), made of Aztec Tobacco (Nicotiana rustica) as opposed to regular tobacco.

=== Herbal dipping tobacco ===
Herbal dipping tobacco or herbal moist snuff is a tobacco-free and (often) nicotine-free version of moist snuff, a tobacco product used orally by placing either a loose or pouched form along the gum line behind the lip. Some products, although tobacco free, may still contain nicotine, while others are completely tobacco and nicotine free.

Herbal moist snuff has limited exposure in tobacco shops compared to traditional products, so sales generally take place online.
