= Mavai-ye Sofla, Kermanshah =

Mavai-ye Sofla ماواي سفلي
- Village
- Location within Iran
- Coordinates: 34°13′16″N 47°16′36″E
- Country: Iran
- Province: Kermanshah
- County: Kermanshah
- Bakhsh: Central
- Rural District: Qarah Su

Population (2006)
  - Total: 139
- Time zone: UTC+3:30 (IRST)
  - Summer (DST): UTC+4:30 (IRDT)

Mavai-ye Sofla (Persian: ماواي سفلي, also Romanized as Māvāī-ye Soflá; also known as Ma’vā, Ma’vā-ye Pā’īn, Ma’vā-ye Soflá, Ma‘vā-ye Soflá, and Mawa) is a village in Qarah Su Rural District, in the Central District of Kermanshah County, Kermanshah Province, Iran. At the 2006 census, its population was 139, in 24 families.
