= Mavai-ye Olya =

Mavai-ye Olya ماواي عليا
- Village
- Location within Iran
- Coordinates: 34°13′16″N 47°15′56″E
- Country: Iran
- Province: Kermanshah
- County: Kermanshah
- Bakhsh: Central
- Rural District: Qarah Su

Population (2006)
  - Total: 47
- Time zone: UTC+3:30 (IRST)
  - Summer (DST): UTC+4:30 (IRDT)

Mavai-ye Olya (Persian: ماواي عليا, also Romanized as Mavāī-e ‘Olyā; also known as Ma‘vā'-e ‘Olyā and Ma‘vā-ye ‘Olyā) is a village in Qarah Su Rural District, in the Central District of Kermanshah County, Kermanshah Province, Iran. At the 2006 census, its population was 47, in 10 families.
