= Gutka =

Tobacco preparation chewed in South Asia

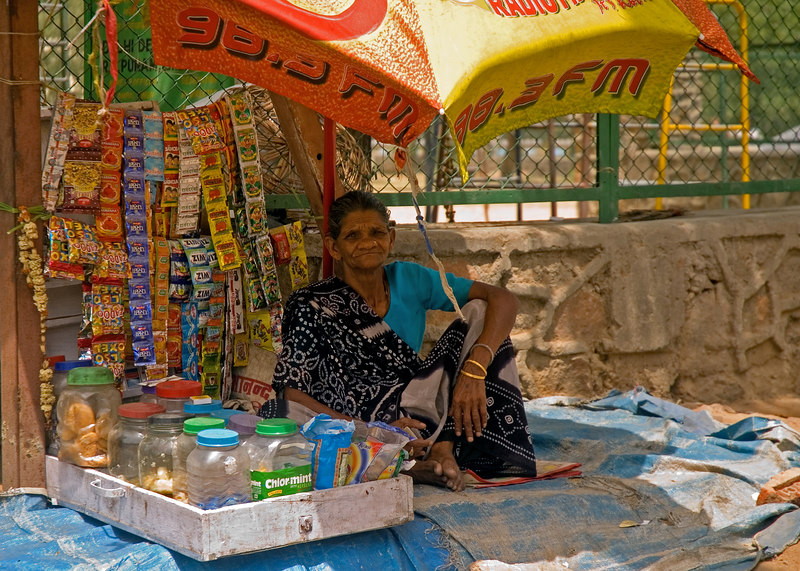
Gutka street vendor in Himachal Pradesh, India

Gutka (Note: Also spelled ghutka or guṭkha, pronounced /ˈɡʌtkə/ GUHT-kə.) is a type of betel quid and chewing tobacco preparation made of crushed areca nut (also called betel nut), tobacco, catechu, paraffin wax, slaked lime (calcium hydroxide) and sweet or savory flavourings, in India, Pakistan, other Asian countries, and North America.

Using gutka is highly addictive and can cause various harmful effects such as head and neck cancer, oral and oropharyngeal cancers, coronary heart disease, as well as negative reproductive effects including stillbirth, premature birth and low birth weight.

Gutka is manufactured in the sub-continent and exported to a few other countries, often marketed under the guise of a "safer" product than cigarettes and tobacco. Reported to have both stimulant and relaxation effects, it is sold throughout South Asia and some Pacific regions in small, individual-sized foil packets/sachets and tins that cost between 2 and 10 rupees each. It is widely consumed in Northern India, Pakistan and the Madhesh region of Nepal. Gutka is consumed by placing a pinch of it between the gum and cheek and gently sucking and chewing, similar to chewing tobacco. Due to containing cancer-causing substances, it is subjected in India to the same restrictions and warnings as cigarettes. Highly addictive and a known carcinogen, gutkha is the subject of much controversy in India. Many states have sought to curb its immense popularity by taxing sales of gutkha heavily or by banning it.

== Characteristics ==
Gutka is a commercially produced form of smokeless tobacco. Manufacturers add sweet or savory flavours, making it more appealing to women and young people in some locations. The combinations of gutka ingredients vary according to local preferences. Spices may include mustard, turmeric, anise seeds, cardamom, saffron and cloves.

In addition to areca nut, nicotine, slaked lime, paraffin and catechu, it can be laced with thousands of chemicals. It is a powdery, granular, light brownish to white substance. Within moments of chewing mixing with saliva, the gutkha begins to dissolve and turn deep red in colour. It may impart upon its user a "buzz" somewhat more intense than that of tobacco chewing, snuffing and smoking.

Gutka turns saliva bright red, and when it is chewed long and often enough it will stain a user's teeth bright red too. Saliva is generally spat onto a wall or at the ground, causing a red stain that is quite resistant to the elements. Some building owners have taken to combating this by painting murals of gods on their walls, with the idea that gutkha chewers would not spit on a god.

"Quid chewing has claimed to produce a sense of well being, euphoria, warm sensations of the body, sweating, salivation, palpitation and heightened alertness, tolerance to hunger, and increased capacity and stamina to work."

== Health effects ==
Gutka is highly addictive, represents a major health risk, has no safe level use and is not a safe substitute for smoking. Globally smokeless tobacco products such as gutka contribute to 650,000 deaths each year with a significant proportion of them in Southeast Asia.

Using gutka can cause a number of adverse health effects such as head and neck cancer, oral cancer, oral submucous fibrosis, oesophagus cancer, and pancreatic cancer, cardiovascular disease and asthma. It also raises the risk of fatal coronary artery disease, fatal stroke and non-fatal ischaemic heart disease When a person chews gutka, the mixture directly enters the system through the oral cavity, which absorbs 28 cancer-causing chemicals.

Gutka can cause adverse reproductive effects including stillbirth, premature birth and low birth weight. Nicotine in gutka that are used during pregnancy can affect how a baby's brain develops before birth.

Gutka use causes the production of various reactive free radicals that induce oxidative stress, particularly in oral tissues. Gutka exposure can lead to the oxidation of guanine bases in DNA to form 8-hydroxy-2'-deoxyguanosine (8-OHdG or its tautomer 8-oxo-dG) as a major byproduct. Exposure to Gutka tends to be highest in saliva and urine as evaluated by measuring 8-OHdG in DNA.

Creative advertising by tobacco companies and lack of accessible information for the public leads to many gutka users being unaware of the dangers it can bring. Often users believe that gutka can act as a digestion aid, kill germs and generally give a sense of well-being. In fact 34.4% of smokers have switched to smokeless tobacco use as way to quit but there is no scientific evidence that using gutka can help a person quit smoking. As of 2015 it was the fourth most common addictive product worldwide.

== Usage ==
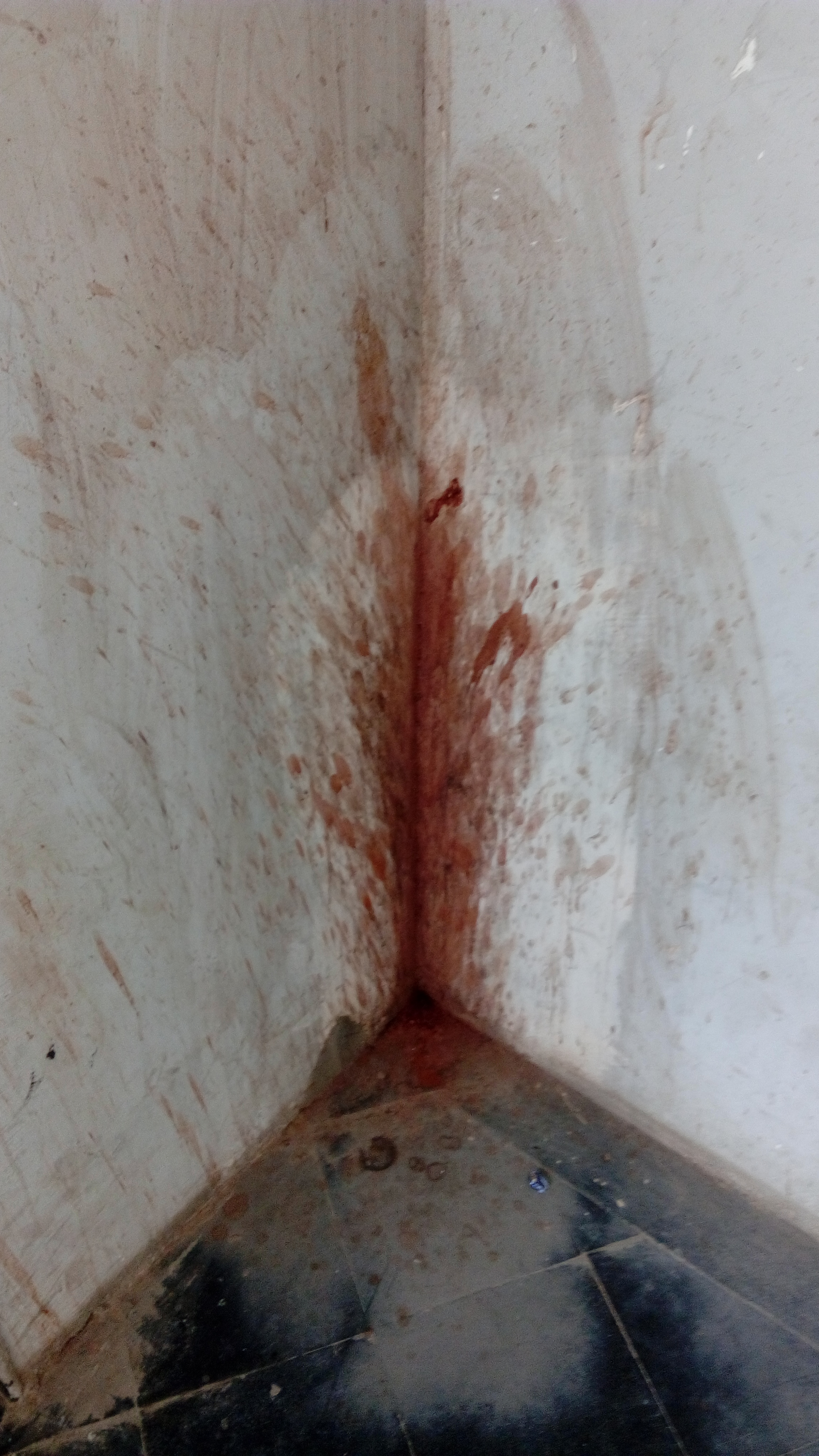
Red stains of Gutka on walls due to spitting

Use of gutka and other forms of tobacco are culturally ingrained and use can begin at a young age. Smokeless tobacco use is most common in India where oral cancer accounts for 30 to 40% of cancer cases. Its use has been reported in Thailand, Sri Lanka, Bangladesh, Pakistan, Malaysia, Cambodia, China, Indonesia and New Guinea. Immigrants to the United Kingdom, parts of Africa, Australia, North America have brought their habits with them.

Gutka is readily available in these locations, especially in highly populated areas. Immigrants to the United States where spitting in public is not as socially acceptable, learn to be discreet. Those in the lower socioeconomic populations are especially at risk. It is here that access to education and treatment is limited. Easy access and extremely low cost lead to early addiction and the prevalence of gutka use. Precancerous lesions have been observed in young children and symptoms of cancer often appear by high school or college age.

Smoking is not allowed in many places, and when done by children, is disapproved of. In contrast gutka use, being all but invisible to others, is the method of choice. A New York Times article reported in 2002 that sales of gutka and the tobaccoless version, paan masala, reached $1 billion a year.

=== India ===
Over 25% of India's population use tobacco products including cigarettes and multiple forms of smokeless tobacco. India has the largest number of smokeless tobacco users in the world. The poorest populations are greatly affected due to the detrimental effects of its use and the subsequent costs of medical care. Many Indian states have sought to curb the use and spread of gutka by taxing sales heavily or by banning it.

They have banned the sale, manufacture, distribution and storage of gutka and all its variants. As of May 2013, nicotine or tobacco laced gutka is banned in 24 states and 3 union territories. The federal Food Safety and Regulation (Prohibition) Act 2011 allows harmful products such as gutka to be banned for a year. This can be renewed annually, resulting in a permanent ban. The ban is enforced by the state public health ministry, the state Food and Drug Administration, and the local police. Enforcement of the law is generally lax and many shops still sell gutka, although it may not be displayed. Enforcement is stricter in some regions like Mumbai and Delhi, but illegal sale of gutka still occurs.

In 2019, the Delhi government extended the ban for one more year on gutka, pan masala, flavoured/scented tobacco, kharra and similar products containing tobacco. In September 2012, State of Delhi banned Gutka and Pan Masala containing tobacco and/or nicotine. After the notification, Gutka manufacturers separated the components like tobacco from Gutka and Pan Masala. Since the term 'Gutka and Pan Masala Containing Tobacco' was used in the notification. The components like tobacco were manufactured and sold in separate pouches after the ban. The notification was revised in March 2015 to make it more strict and banned all smokeless tobacco (SLT) products including twin-pack. Offenders can be fined or receive prison sentences. The law has provisions of imposing fines up to ₹25,000 (US$270) on the sale of products that are injurious to health.

State	Date of ban	Remarks	Ref.
Andaman and Nicobar	1 November 2012		
Andhra Pradesh	9 January 2013		
Arunachal Pradesh			
Assam			
Bihar	30 May 2012	The law was upheld by the Patna High Court.	
Chandigarh			
Chhattisgarh	24 July 2012		
Delhi	11 September 2012	On 12 October 2012, the Delhi High Court refused to lift ban in response to a plea by a city-based gutka manufacturer.	
Goa	2 October 2005		
Gujarat	11 September 2012	100% export-oriented units are exempt from the ban.	
Himachal Pradesh	13 July 2012		
Haryana	15 August 2012		
Jharkhand	24 July 2012		
Kerala	25 May 2012	On 2 August 2012, Kerala High Court declined to stay the ban.	
Karnataka	31 May 2013		
Madhya Pradesh	1 April 2012	The law was upheld by the Madhya Pradesh High Court.	
Maharashtra	20 July 2012	Previous bans on gutka on 1 August 2002 and again in 2008 were overturned by the Supreme Court on the grounds of unfair trade practice. The most recent ban was upheld by the Bombay High Court on 15 September 2012.	
Manipur			
Mizoram	18 October 2012		
Nagaland			
Odisha	1 January 2013		
Punjab	26 August 2012		
Rajasthan	18 July 2012		
Sikkim	17 September 2012		
Tamil Nadu	8 May 2013		
Uttar Pradesh	1 April 2013		
Uttarakhand	1 January 2013		
West Bengal	1 May 2013		

Research firm Edelweiss estimates the gutka ban will cause the industry ₹15−20 billion in losses.

==== Advertising ====
Like alcohol and tobacco products, there is a ban on advertisement of gutka. Often tobacco companies advertise gutka as pan masala in order to skirt the ban on advertising tobacco products. Surrogate advertisements often use pan masala ads to promote gutka products with similar name and packaging.

According to the Food Safety and Standards (Prohibition and Restriction on Sales) Regulations, 2011 of the Food Safety and Standards Authority of India, misleading advertisement of such products invites a fine of ₹1,000,000 (US$11,000).

According to StraitsResearch, The India pan masala market is expected to reach US$10,365 million by 2026 at the CAGR of 10.4% during the forecast period 2019–2026. The India pan masala market is driven by significant switching of consumers from tobacco products to pan masala, aggressive advertising and convenient packaging, and Maharashtra State's revocation of the ban over pan masala products.
