= History of nicotine marketing =

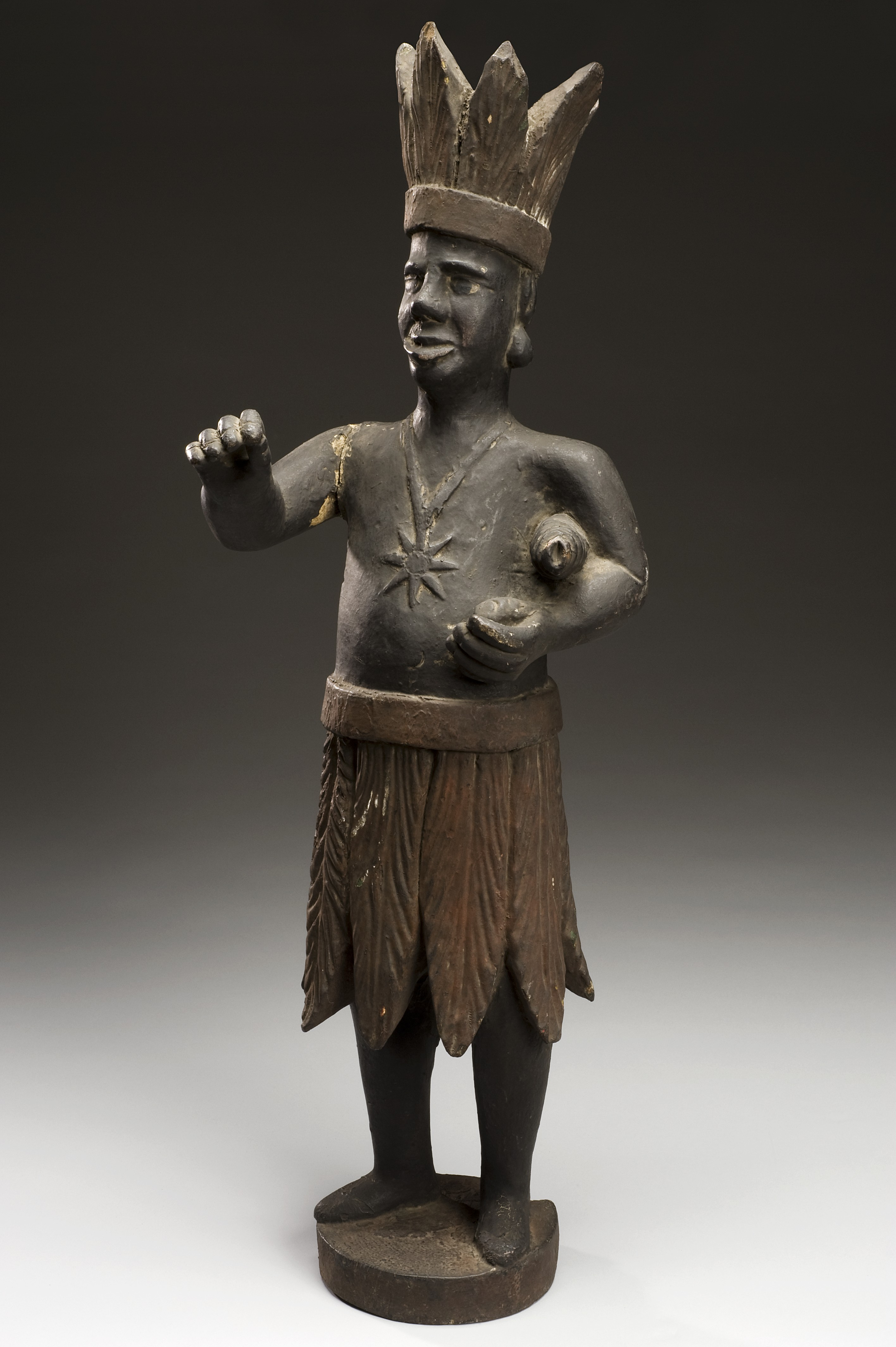
Cigar store Indian likely meant to portray a Powhatan leader, made in ~1750 and used to advertise a tobacconist's shop in England until 1900. At the time the sign was made, the Powhatan Confederacy had been destroyed and its people enslaved for decades.

The history of nicotine marketing stretches back centuries. Nicotine marketing has continually developed new techniques in response to historical circumstances, societal and technological change, and regulation. Counter marketing has also changed, in both message and commonness, over the decades, often in response to pro-nicotine marketing.

== Pre-1800 ==
The coughing, throat irritation, and shortness of breath caused by smoking are obvious, and tobacco was criticized as unhealthy long before the invention of the clinical study. In A Counterblaste to Tobacco (1604), James VI of Scotland and I of England described smoking as "A custome lothsome to the eye, hatefull to the Nose, harmefull to the braine, dangerous to the Lungs, and in the blacke stinking fume thereof, neerest resembling the horrible Stigian smoke of the pit that is bottomelesse", and urged his subjects not to use tobacco. In the 1600s, many countries banned its use. Pope Urban VIII issued a 1624 papal bull condemning tobacco and making its use in holy places punishable by excommunication; Pope Benedict XIII repealed the ban one hundred years later.

== 1800–1880 ==
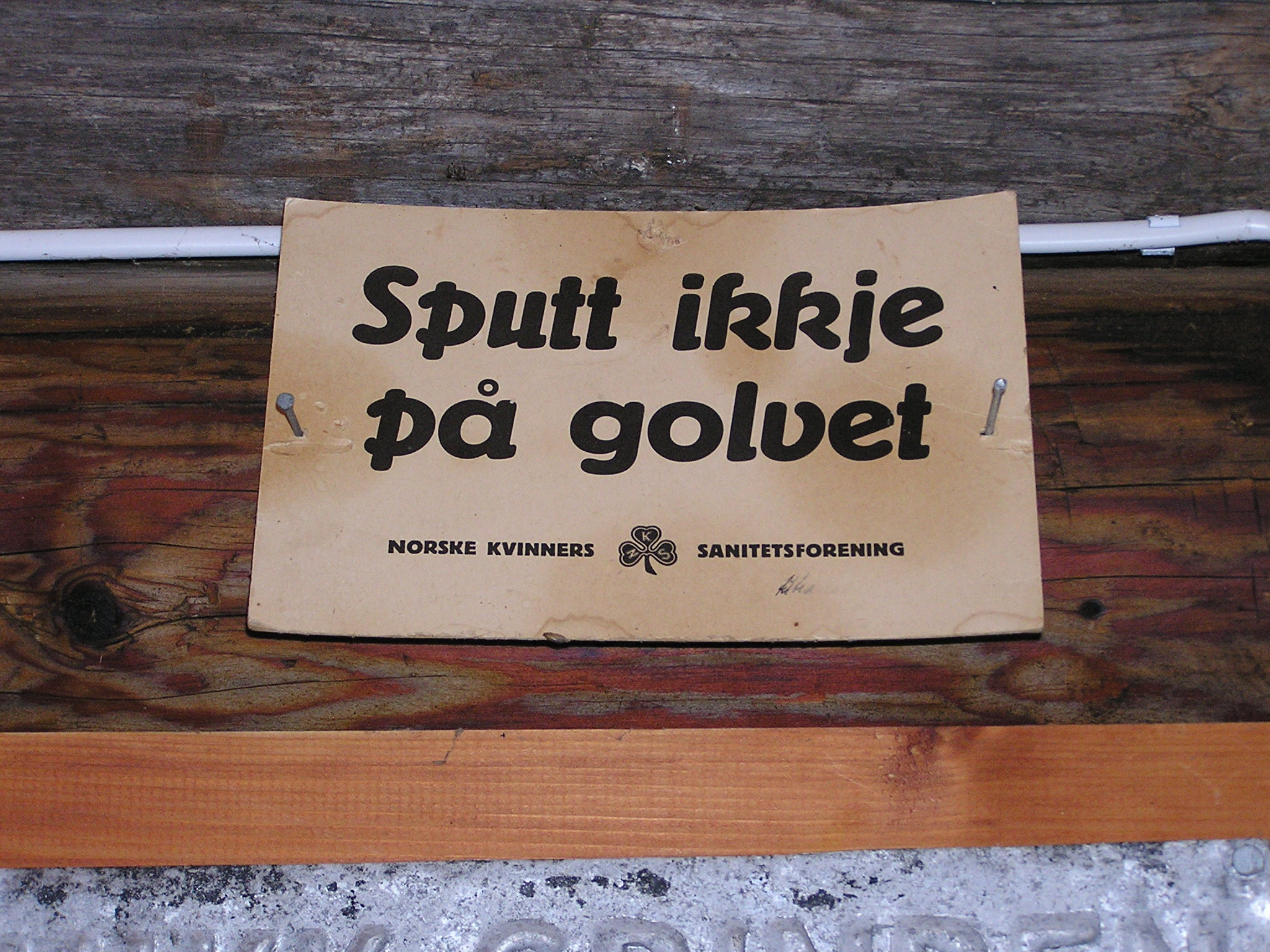
A sign asks readers (likely tobacco chewers) not to spit on the floor. Part of an anti-tuberculosis campaign by the Norwegian Women's Public Health Association.

The first known nicotine advertisement in the United States was for the snuff and tobacco products and was placed in the New York daily paper in 1789. At the time, American tobacco markets were local. Consumers would generally request tobacco by quality, not brand name, until after the 1840s.

Many European tobacco bans were repealed during the Revolutions of 1848. Cigarettes were first made in Seville, from cigar scraps. British soldiers took up the habit during the Crimean War (1853–1856). The American Civil War in the early 1860s also led to increased demand for tobacco from American soldiers, and in non-tobacco-growing regions. Public health measures against chewing tobacco (spitting, especially other than in a spitoon, spread diseases such as flu and tuberculosis) increased cigarette consumption. After the development of color lithography in the late 1870s, collectible picture series were printed onto cigarette cards, previously only used to stiffen the packaging.

In 1913, a cigarette brand was advertised nationally for the first time in the US. RJ Reynolds advertised it as milder than competing cigarettes.

== Mass production and temperance, 1880–1914 ==
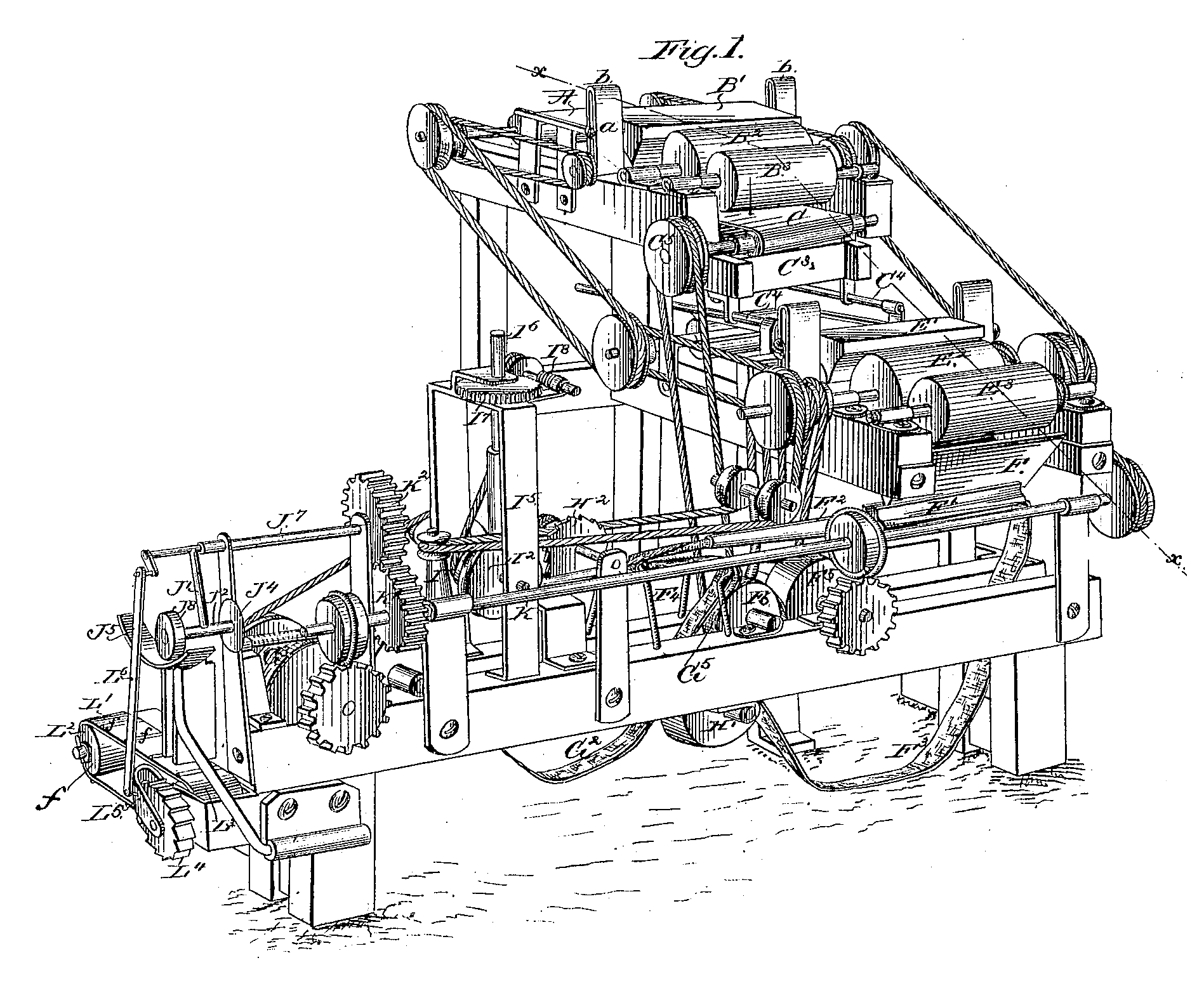
An early cigarette-rolling machine mass-produced cigarettes at fifty times the speed of a human cigarette roller.

Pre-rolled cigarettes, like cigars, were initially expensive, as a skilled cigarette roller could produce only about four cigarettes per minute on average Cigarette-making machines were developed in the 1880s, replacing hand-rolling. One early machine could roll 120,000 cigarettes in 10 hours, or 200 a minute. Mass production revolutionized the cigarette industry. Cigarette companies began to reckon production in millions of cigarettes per day.

Higher production and cheaper cigarettes gave companies an incentive to increase consumption. By the last quarter of the 19th century, magazines carried advertisements for different brands of cigarettes, snuff, and pipe tobacco. Demand for cigarettes rose exponentially, ~doubling every five years in Canada and the US (until demand began to rise even faster, ~tripling during the four years of World War I).

=== Anti-tobacco movements ===
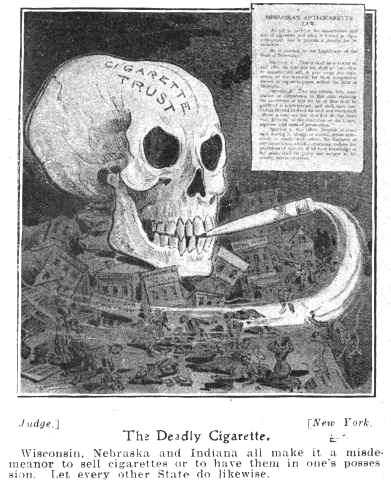
"The Deadly Cigarette"; a 1905 cartoon celebrates bans on the sale and possession of tobacco in three U.S. States, and calls on other states to follow their lead.

In the late 1800s, the temperance movement was strongly involved in anti-tobacco campaigns, and particularly with the prevention of youth smoking. They argued that smoking was addictive, unhealthy, stunted the growth of children, and, in women, was harmful during pregnancy.

By 1890, 26 American states had banned sales to minors. Over the next decade, further restrictions were legislated, including prohibitions on sale; measures were widely circumvented, for instance by selling expensive matches and giving away cigarettes with them, so there were further bans on giving out free samples of cigarettes.

After women won the vote in the early 1900s, temperance groups successfully campaigned for Juvenile Smoking Laws throughout Australia. At this time, most adults there smoked pipes, and cigarettes were used only by juveniles.

== 1914–1950 ==
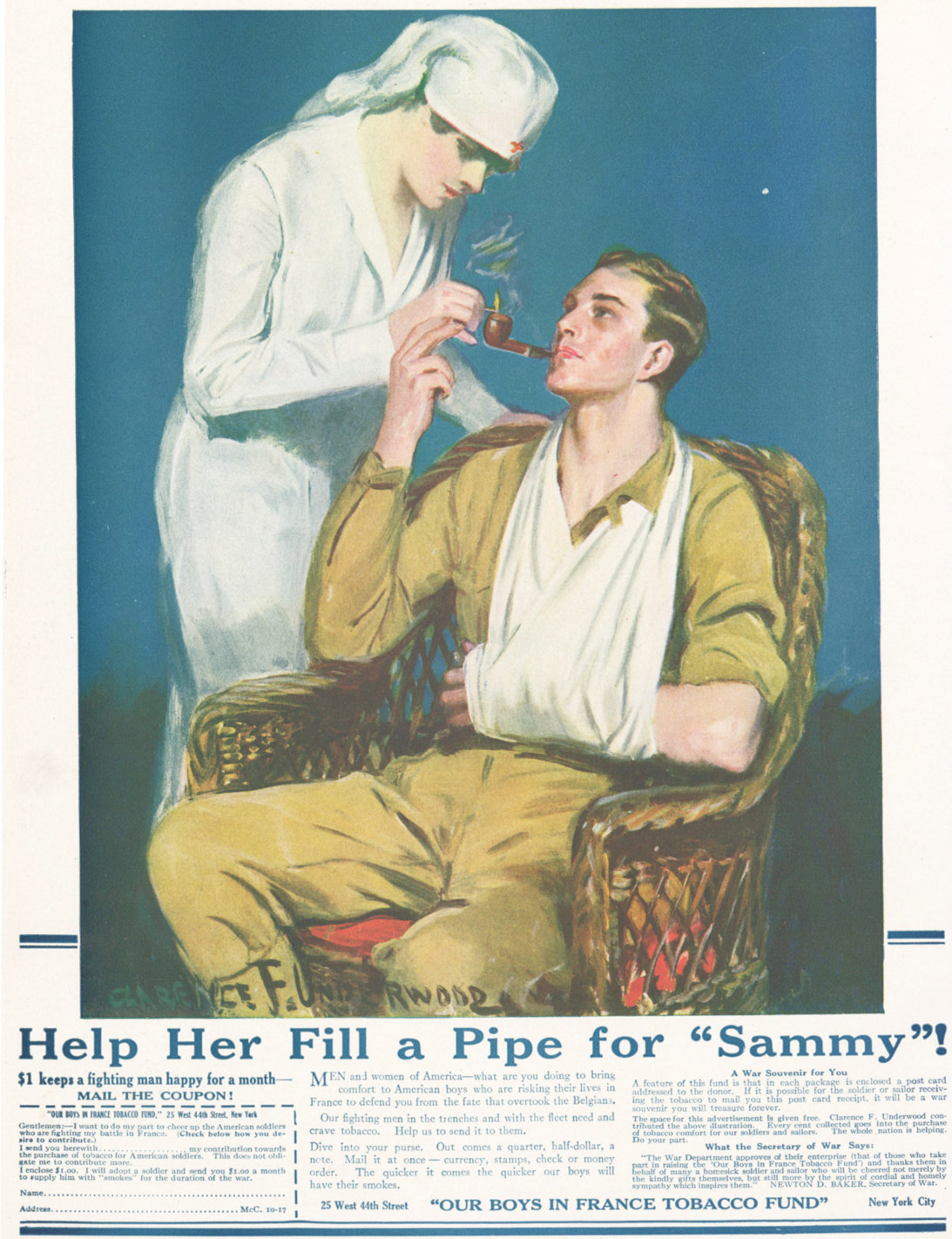
An American poster soliciting donations for a fund to send cigarettes to the front in WWI. A nurse lights a pipe for an injured soldier, who guides her hand. The implication that tobacco heals is subtle, but was consistently used. There is also an implication that the nurse finds smoking sexually attractive.

=== World War I ===
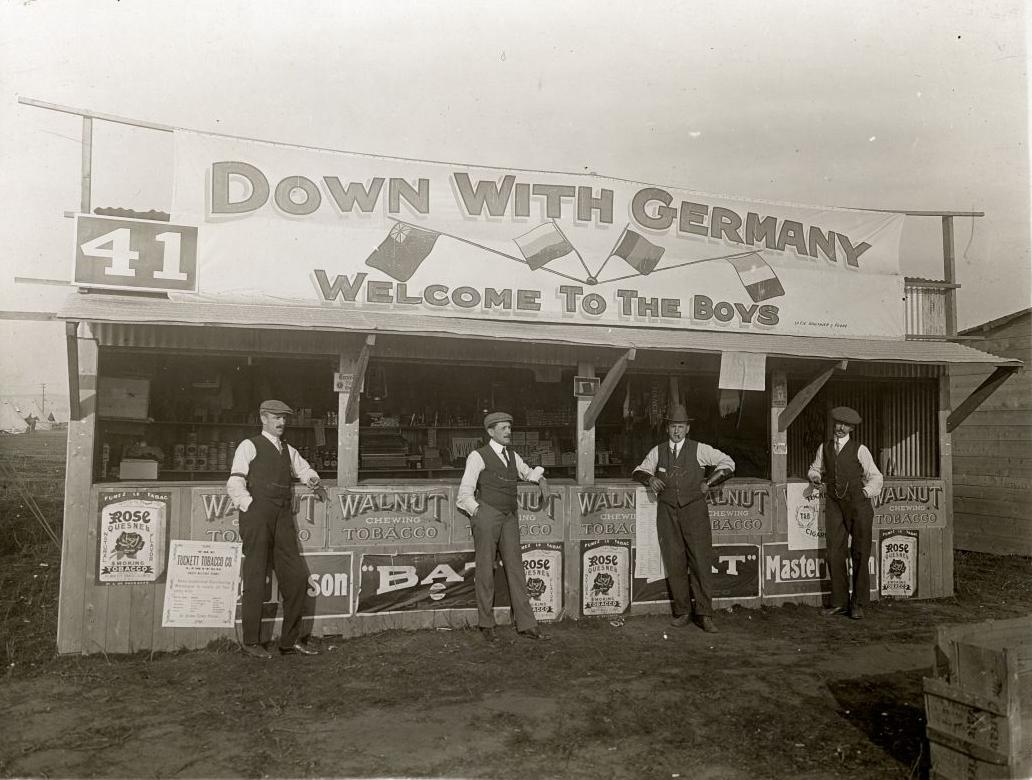
World War I, circa 1915. A tobacco concession stand, with ads, at Valcartier military base near Quebec City

Free or subsidized branded cigarettes were distributed to troops during World War I. Demand for cigarettes in North America, which had been roughly doubling every five years, began to rise even faster, now approximately tripling during the four years of war.

In the face of imminent violent death, the health harms of cigarettes became less of a concern, and there was public support for drives to get cigarettes to the front lines. Billions of cigarettes were distributed to soldiers in Europe by national governments, the YMCA, the Salvation Army, and the Red Cross. Private individuals also donated money to send cigarettes to the front, even from jurisdictions where the sale of cigarettes was illegal. Not giving soldiers cigarettes was seen as unpatriotic.

=== Interwar ===
By the time the war was over, a generation had grown up, and a large proportion of adults smoked, making anti-smoking campaigns substantially more difficult. Returning soldiers continued to smoke, making smoking more socially acceptable. Temperance groups began to concentrate their efforts on alcohol. By 1927, American states had repealed all their anti-smoking laws, except those on minors. Modern advertising was created with the innovative techniques used in tobacco advertising beginning in the 1920s.

Advertising in the interwar period consisted primarily of full page, color magazine and newspaper advertisements. Many companies created slogans for their brand and used celebrity endorsements from famous men and women. Some advertisements contained fictional doctors reassuring customers that their specific brand was good for health.

Smoking was also widely seen in films, possibly due to paid product placement.

In 1924, menthol cigarettes were invented, but they were not initially popular, remaining at a few percent of market share until marketing in the fifties. In the 1920s, tobacco companies continued to target women, aiming to increase the number of smokers. At first, in light of the threat of tobacco prohibition from temperance unions, marketing was subtle; it indirectly and deniably suggested that women smoked. Testimonials from smoking female celebrities were used. Ads were designed to "prey on female insecurities about weight and diet", encouraging smoking as a healthy alternative to eating sweets. Campaigns used the traditional association that smoking was improper for women to advantage. They marketed cigarettes as "Torches of Freedom", and made a dependence-inducing drug a symbol of women's independence. Lung cancer rates in women rose sharply.

In 1929 Edward Bernays, commissioned by the American Tobacco Company to get more women smoking, decided to hire women to smoke their "torches of freedom" as they walked in the Easter Sunday Parade in New York. He was very careful when picking women to march because "while they should be good looking, they should not look too model-y" and he hired his own photographers to make sure that good pictures were taken and then published around the world.

In 1929, the Sturmabteilung, the paramilitary wing of the Nazi Party, founded a cigarette company as a way to raise funds and make itself less financially dependent on the party leadership. SA members were expected to smoke only SA brands. There is evidence that coercion was used to promote the sale of these cigarettes. Through this scheme, a typical SA unit earned hundreds of Reichsmarks each month. The brand also promoted political ideas, being sold with collectible image sets showing historical army uniforms.

=== Medical concerns ===
Old joke

Of course it is perfectly easy to give up smoking. One would not like to think that one has become such a slave to tobacco that one cannot do without it—a drug which weakens the heart, damages the nerves, gives you cancer and catarrh and so on. Personally I have given up smoking repeatedly.

— "On Giving Up Smoking". Punch or The London Charivari. London. 1934-11-07. p. 506.; this was an old joke even in 1934

Skyrocketing European lung cancer rates drew attention from doctors in the twenties and thirties. Lung cancer had been a vanishingly rare disease. Before 1900, there were only 140 documented cases worldwide. Then, suddenly, lung cancer became a leading cause of death in many countries (a status it retains to this day).

Initially, suspicion was cast on causes including road tar, car exhaust, the 1918 flu pandemic, racial mixing, and the use of chemical weapons in World War I. However, in 1929, a statistical analysis strongly linking lung cancer to smoking was published by Fritz Lickint of Dresden. He did a retrospective cohort study showing that those with lung cancer were, disproportionately, smokers. He also found that men got lung cancer at several times the rate of women, and that, in countries where more women smoked, the difference was much smaller. In 1932, a study in Poland came to the same conclusion, pointing out that the geographic and gender patterns of Polish lung cancer deaths matched those of smoking, but no other suggested cause, such as industry or cars (rare in Poland at the time).

The medical community was criticized for its slow response to these findings. One 1932 paper attributed the slow response to smoking being common among doctors, as well as the general population. Some temperance activists had continued to attack tobacco as expensive, addictive, and leading to petty theft. In the thirties, they also began to publicize the medical findings. There was popular awareness of these dangers of smoking (see accompanying quote).

=== World War II ===
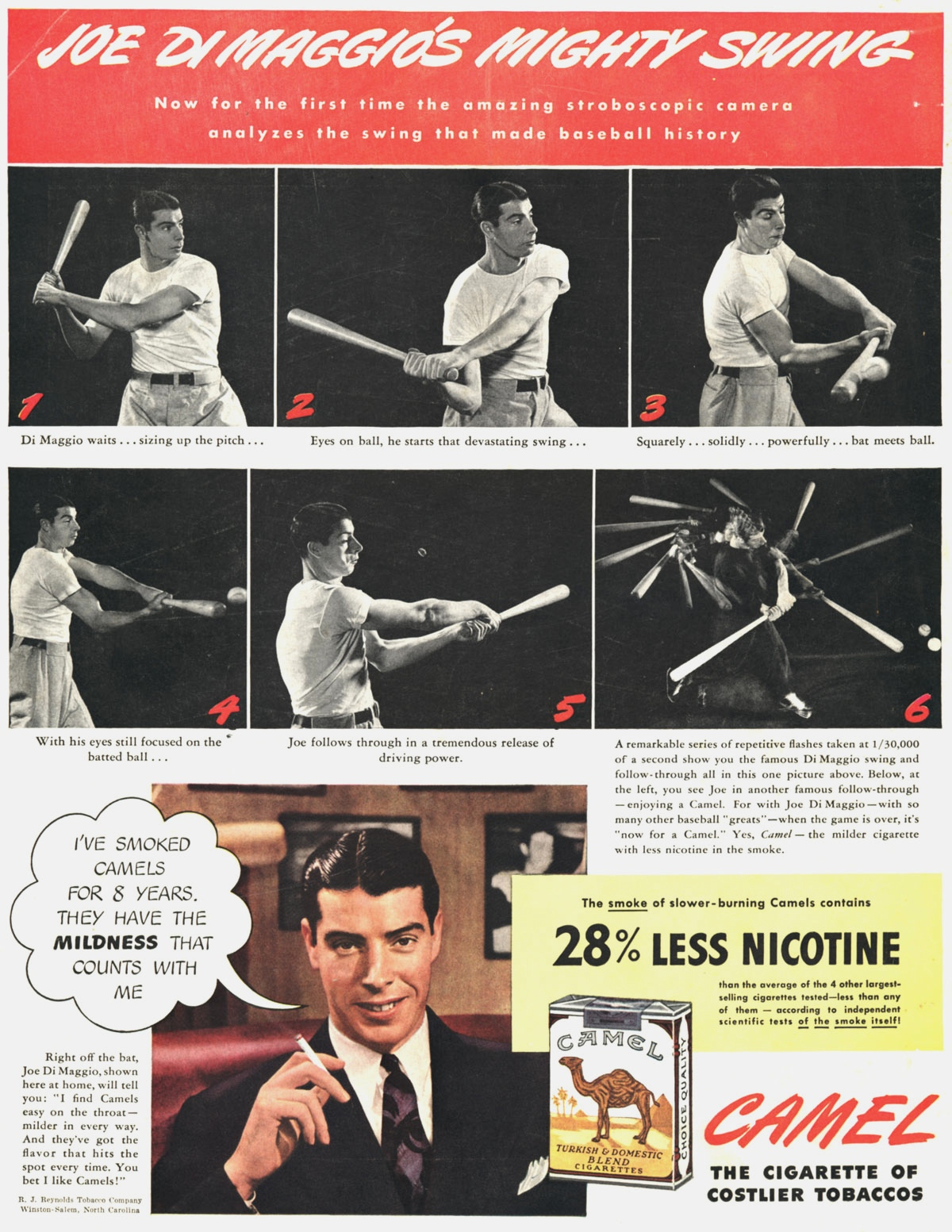
Advertisement featuring baseball player Joe Dimaggio in 1941

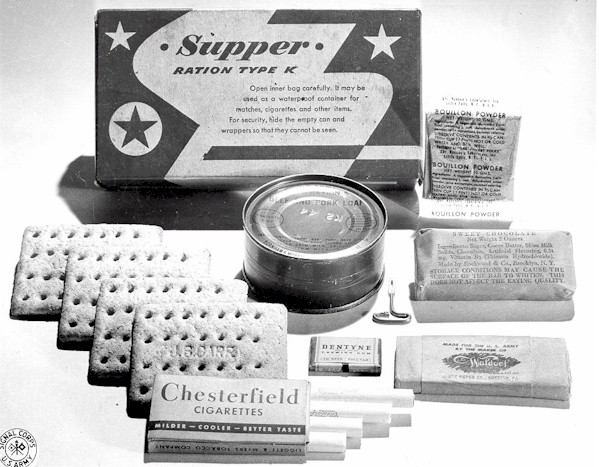
A K-ration contained a pack of four cigarettes (front).

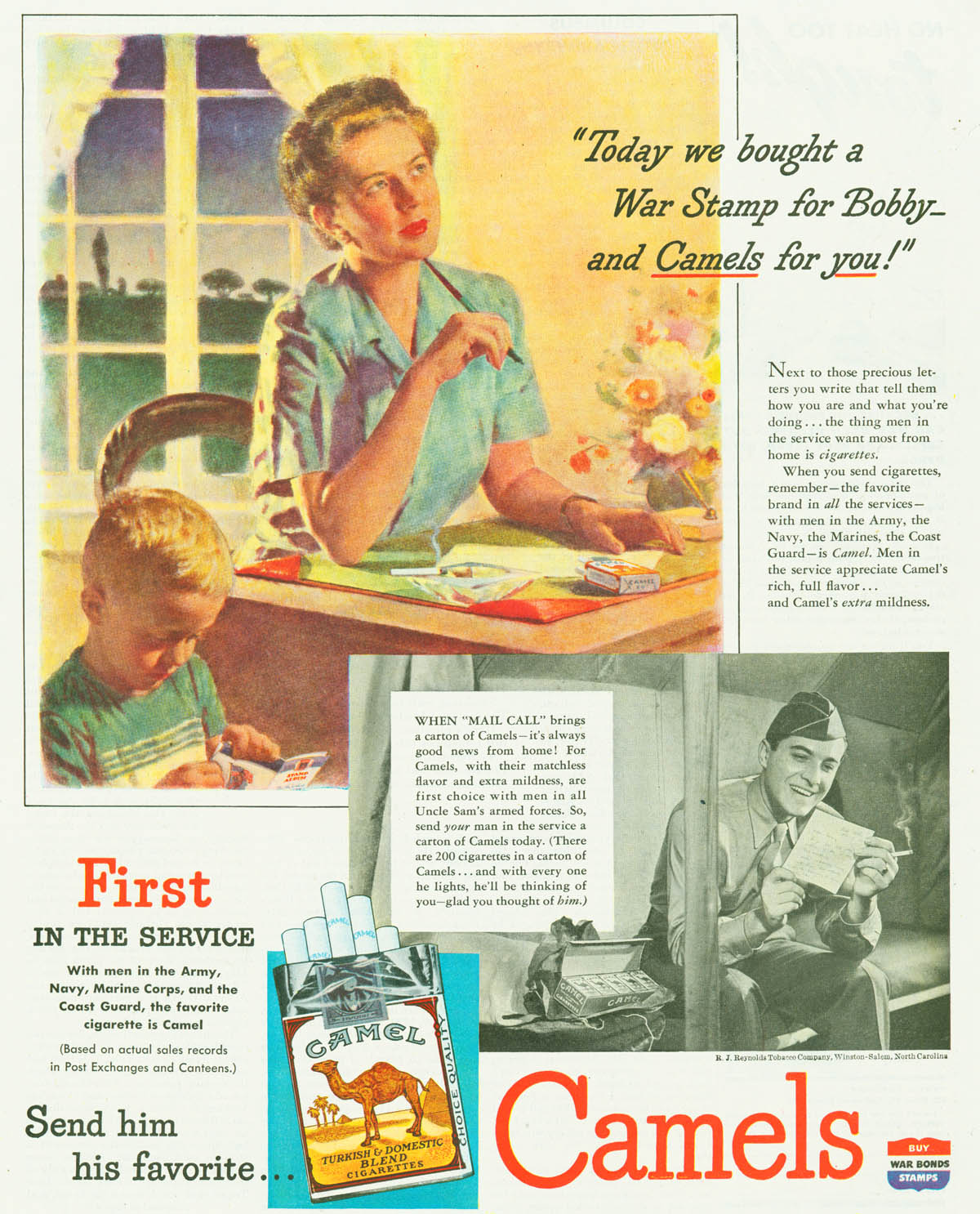
This WWII ad shows a wife sending her soldier husband a carton of cigarettes, and urges others to do the same. A mention of War Stamps associates the brand still more closely to war patriotism.

Despite these findings, free and subsidized branded cigarettes were distributed to soldiers (on both sides) during World War II. Cigarettes were included in American soldiers' K-rations and C-rations, since many tobacco companies sent the soldiers cigarettes for free. Cigarette sales reached an all-time high at this point, as cigarette companies were not only able to get soldiers addicted, but specific brands also found a new loyal group of customers as soldiers who smoked their cigarettes returned from the war.

A faction of the Nazi Party opposed tobacco use. The Institute for Tobacco Hazards Research was founded. Some of those working with it were involved in mass murder and unethical medical experiments, and killed themselves at the end of the war, including Karl Astel, the head of the institute. The institute and other organizations directed anti-smoking campaigns at both the general public and doctors. Campaigns included pamphlets, reprints of academic articles and books, and smoking bans in many public places; bans were, however, widely ignored. An industry-funded counter-institute, the Tabacologia medicinalis, was shut down by Leonardo Conti. Restrictions on cigarette advertising were enacted. After 1941, the Nazi party restricted anti-tobacco research and campaigns, for instance ordering the private anti-tobacco magazine Reine Luft to moderate its tone and submit all materials for censorship before publication.

Tobacco companies continue to exploit associations with Nazis to fight anti-tobacco measures. Modern Germany has some of Europe's least restrictive tobacco control policies, and more Germans both smoke and die of it in consequence.

== 1950–70 ==
Until the 1970s, most tobacco advertising was legal in the United States and most European nations. In the 1940s and 50s, tobacco was a major radio sponsor; in the 1950s and 60s, they became predominantly involved in television. In the United States, in the 1950s and 1960s, cigarette brands frequently sponsored television shows—notably To Tell the Truth and I've Got a Secret. Brand jingles were commonly used on radio and television. Major cigarette companies would advertise their brands in popular TV shows such as The Flintstones and The Beverly Hillbillies, which were watched by many children and teens. In 1964, after facing much pressure from the public, The Cigarette Advertising Code was created by the tobacco companies, which prohibited advertising directed to youth.

Advertising continued to use celebrities and famous athletes. Popular comedian Bob Hope was used to advertise for cigarette companies. The African-American magazine Ebony often used athletes to advertise major cigarette brands.

The nicotine industry also promoted "modified risk" nicotine products, falsely implied to be less harmful, such as roasted, "filter", menthol, and ventilated ("light") cigarettes. These products were used to discourage quitting, by offering unwilling smokers an alternative to quitting, and implying that using the alternate product would reduce the hazards of smoking. "Modified risk" products also attract new smokers.

It is now known that these products are not less harmful. Filter cigarettes became near-universal, but smokers suffered just as much illness and death. Initially, efforts were made to develop filters that actually reduced harms; as it became obvious that this was not economically possible, filters were instead designed to turn brown with use. Light cigarettes became so popular that, as of 2004, half of American smokers preferred them over regular cigarettes, According to The Federal Government's National Cancer Institute (NCI), light cigarettes provide no benefit to smokers' health. There is no evidence that menthol cigarettes are healthier, but there is evidence that they are somewhat easier to become addicted to and harder to quit.

Racial marketing strategies changed during the fifties, with more attention paid to racial market segmentation. The civil rights movement lead to the rise of African-American publications, such as Ebony. This helped tobacco companies to target separate marketing messages by race. Tobacco companies supported civil rights organizations, and advertised their support heavily. Industry motives were, according to their public statements, to support civil rights causes; according to an independent review of internal tobacco industry documents, they were "to increase African American tobacco use, to use African Americans as a frontline force to defend industry policy positions, and to defuse tobacco control efforts". There had been internal resistance to tobacco sponsorship, and some organizations are now rejecting nicotine funding as a matter of policy.

Race-specific advertising exacerbated small (a few percent) racial differences in menthol cigarette product preferences into large (tens of percent) ones. Menthol cigarettes are somewhat more addictive, and it has been argued that race-specific marketing for a more addictive product is a social injustice.

Despite it being illegal at the time, tobacco marketers gave out free cigarette samples to children in black neighbourhoods in the U.S. Similar practices continue in parts of the world; a 2016 study found over 12% of South African students had been given free cigarettes by tobacco company representative, with lower rates in five other subsaharan countries. Worldwide, 1 in 10 children had been offered free cigarettes by a tobacco company representative, according to a 2000-2007 survey.

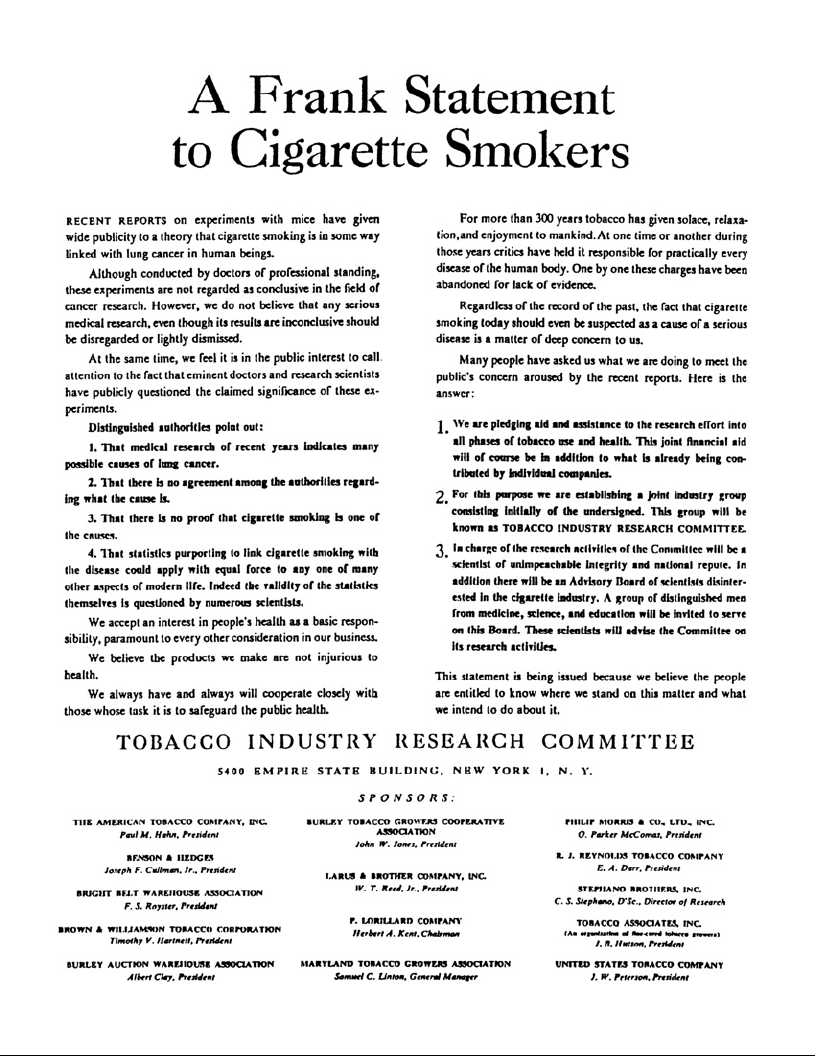
A Frank Statement to Cigarette Smokers (fulltext on Wikisource) denied health effects

In 1954, tobacco companies ran the ad "A Frank Statement." The ad was the first in a disinformation campaign, disputing reports that smoking cigarettes could cause lung cancer and had other dangerous health effects. It also referred to "research of recent years", although solid statistical evidence of a link between smoking and lung cancer had first been published 25 years earlier.

Prior to 1964, many of the cigarette companies advertised their brand by claiming that their product did not have serious health risks. A couple of examples would be "Play safe with Philip Morris" and "More doctors smoke Camels". Such claims were made both to increase the sales of their product and to combat the increasing public knowledge of smoking's negative health effects. A 1953 industry document claims that the survey brand preference among doctors was done on doctors entering a conference, and asked (among a great many camouflage questions) what brand they had on them; marketers had previously placed packs of their Camels in doctors' hotel rooms before the doctors arrived, which probably biassed the results.

In 1964, Smoking and Health: Report of the Advisory Committee to the Surgeon General of the Public Health Service was published. It was based on over 7,000 scientific articles that linked tobacco use with cancer and other diseases. This report led to laws requiring warning labels on tobacco products and to restrictions on tobacco advertisements. As these began to come into force, tobacco marketing became more subtle (for instance, the Joe Camel campaign resulted in increased awareness and uptake of smoking among children). However, restrictions did have an effect on adult quit rates, with its use declining to the point that by 2004, nearly half of all Americans who had ever smoked had quit.

=== Reaching the Black market in the United States ===
Historian Keith Wailoo argues the cigarette industry targeted a new market in the black audience starting in the 1960s. It took advantage of several converging trends. First was the increased national attention on the dangers of lung cancer. Cigarette companies took the initiative in fighting back. they developed menthol-flavored brands like Kool, which seemed to be more soothing to the throat, and advertised these as good for your health. A second trend was the Federal ban on tobacco advertising on radio and television. There was no ban on advertising in the print media, so the industry responded by large scale advertising in Black newspapers and magazines. They erected billboards in inner city neighborhoods. The third trend was the civil rights movement of the 1960s.

Big Tobacco responded by investing heavily in the Civil Rights Movement, winning the gratitude of many national and local leaders. Menthol flavored cigarette brands systematically sponsored local events in the black community, and subsidized major black organizations especially the NAACP (National Association for the Advancement of Colored People). They also subsidized many churches and schools. The marketing initiative was a success as the rate of smoking in the black community grew, while it declined among whites, Furthermore three out of four black smokers purchased menthol cigarettes.

== Post-advertising-restrictions; 1970 and later ==
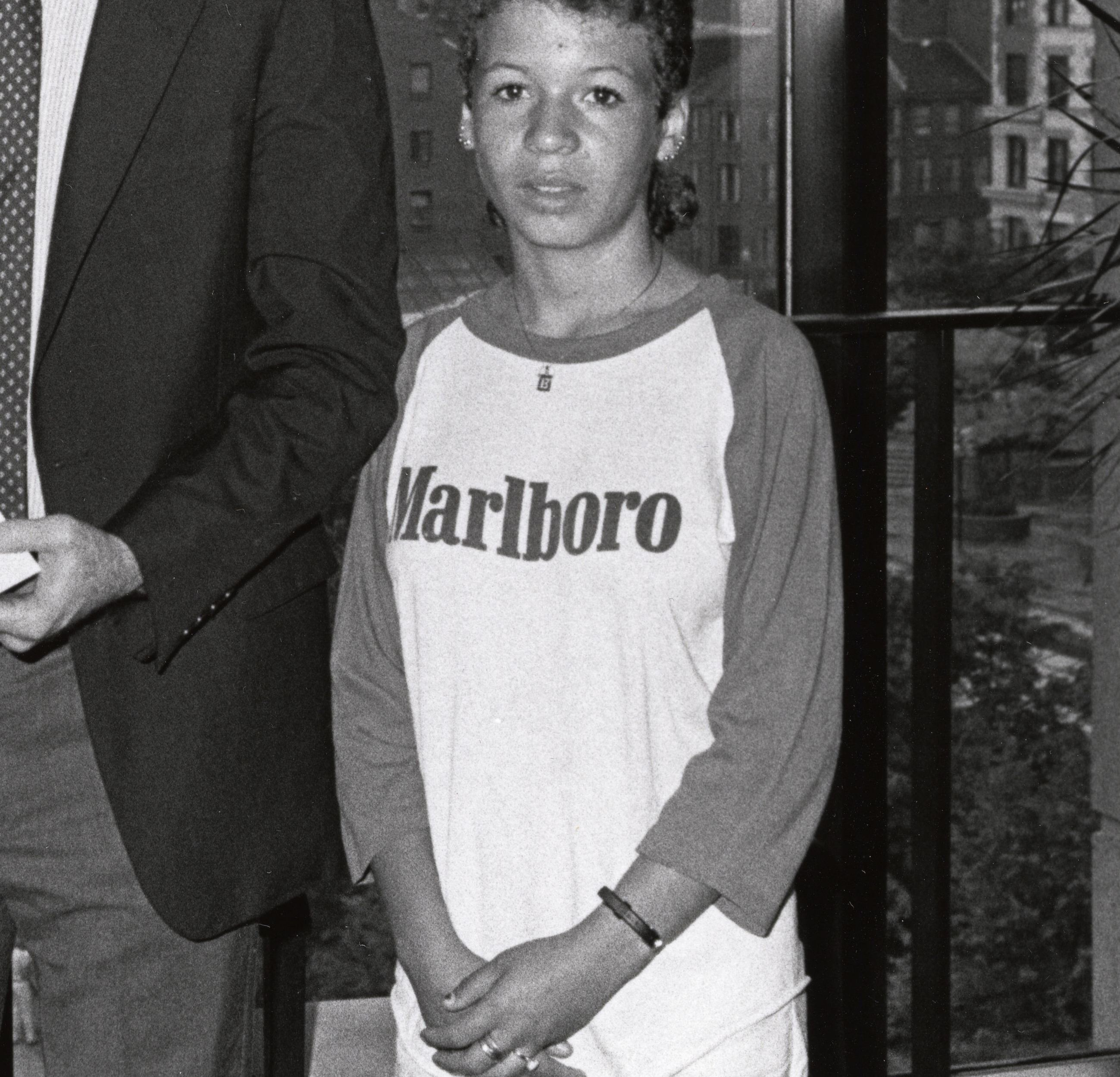
A girl wearing a Marlboro shirt in the 1980s. Owning and being willing to use promotional items is a significant risk factor for nicotine addiction.

The period after nicotine advertising restrictions were brought in is characterised by ingenious circumvention of progressively stricter regulations. The industry continued to dispute medical research: denying, for instance, that nicotine was addictive, while deliberately spiking their cigarettes with additional nicotine to make them more addictive.

Advertising restrictions typically shift advertising spending to unrestricted media. Banned on television, ads move to print; banned in all conventional media, ads shift to sponsorships; banned as in-store advertising and packaging, advertising shifts to shill (undisclosed) marketing reps, sponsored online content, viral marketing, and other stealth marketing techniques.

Another method of evading restrictions is to sell less-regulated nicotine products instead of the ones for which advertising is more regulated. For instance, while TV ads of cigarettes are banned in the United States, similar TV ads of e-cigarettes are not.

The most effective media are usually banned first, meaning advertisers need to spend more money to addict the same number of people. Comprehensive bans can make it impossible to effectively substitute other forms of advertising, leading to actual falls in consumption. However, skillful use of allowed media can increase advertising exposure; the exposure of U.S. children to nicotine advertising is increasing as of 2018.

In the US, sport and event sponsorships and billboards became important in the 1970s and 80s, due to TV and radio advertising bans. Sponsors benefit from placing their advertising at sporting events, naming events after themselves, and recruiting political support from sporting agencies. In the 1980s and 90s, these sponsorships were banned in the US and many other countries. Spending has since shifted to point-of-sale advertising and promotional allowances (where legal), direct mail advertising, and Internet advertising. Stealth marketing is also becoming more common, partly to offset mistrust of the tobacco industry.

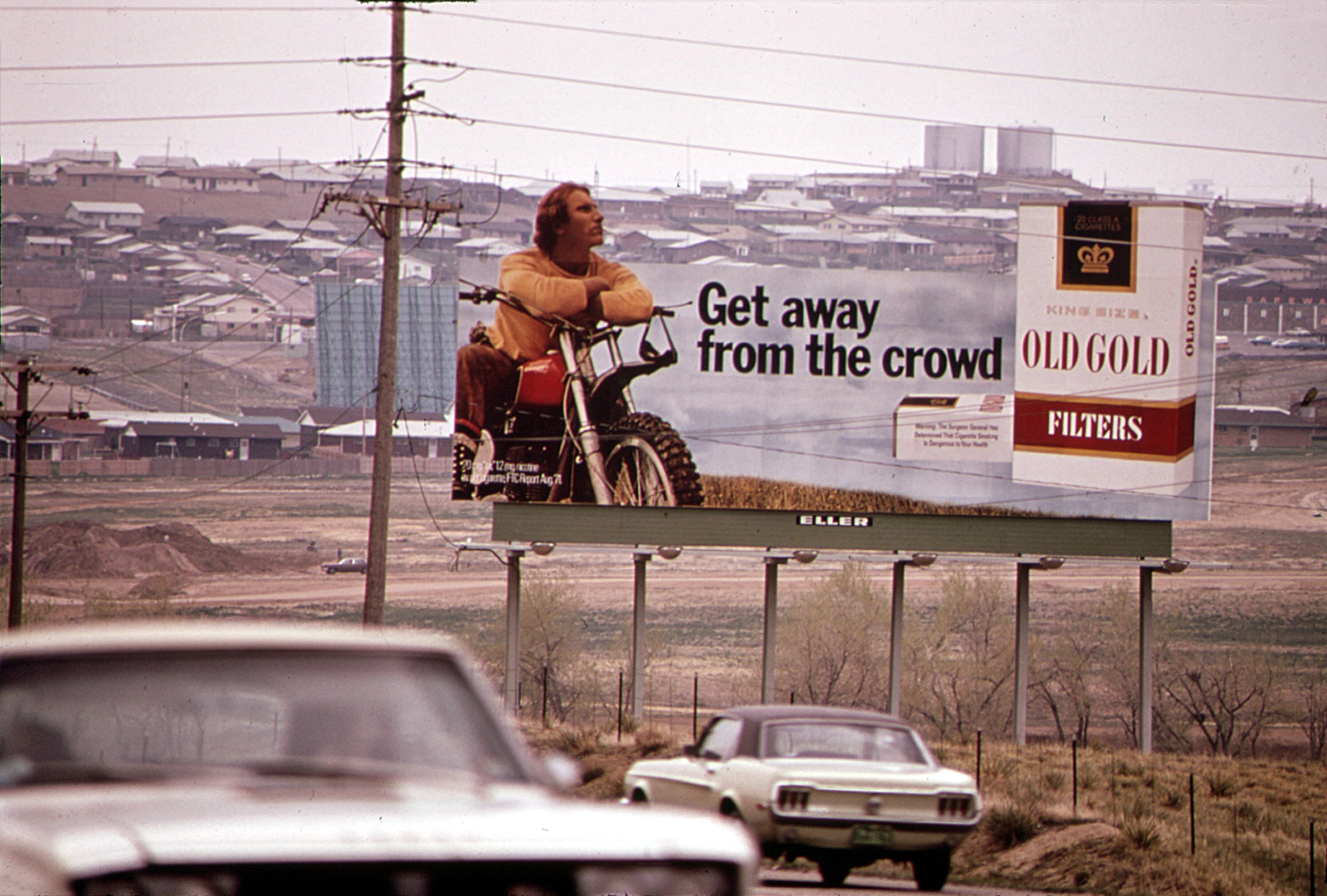
Billboard in Denver promoting Old Gold cigarettes (May 1972)

One major Indian company gives annual bravery awards in its own name; some recipients have rejected or returned them.

Nicotine use is frequently shown in movies. While academics had long speculated that there was paid product placement, it was not until internal industry documents were released that there was hard evidence of such practices. The documents show that in the 1980s and 1990s, cigarettes were shown in return for ≤six-figure (US$) sponsorship deals. More money was paid for a star actor to be shown using nicotine. While this sponsorship is now banned in some countries, it is unclear whether the bans are effective, as such deals are generally not publicized or investigated.

Smokers in movies are generally healthier, more successful, and more racially privileged than actual smokers. Health effects, including coughing and addiction, are shown or mentioned in only a few percent of cases, and are less likely to be mentioned in films targeted at younger viewers.

In the nineties, internet access expanded in many countries; the web is a major medium for nicotine advertising. Both Google and Microsoft have policies that prohibit the promotion of tobacco products on their advertising networks. However, some tobacco retailers are able to circumvent these policies. On Facebook, unpaid content, created and sponsored by tobacco companies, is widely used to advertise nicotine-containing products, with photos of the products, "buy now" buttons and a lack of age restrictions, in contravention of ineffectively enforced Facebook policies.

In 1998, the Tobacco Master Settlement Agreement was reached between the then four largest United States tobacco companies Philip Morris (now Altria), R. J. Reynolds, Brown & Williamson and Lorillard.

== 21st century ==
In 2011, the US Food and Drug Administration wrote a major review of menthol cigarettes, which are somewhat more addictive and no healthier than regular cigarettes. It was subsequently proposed that they should be banned, partially on grounds that race-specific marketing for a more addictive product is racist.

== See also ==
- List of tobacco-related topics
- Nicotine marketing
- Health effects of tobacco

== Gallery ==
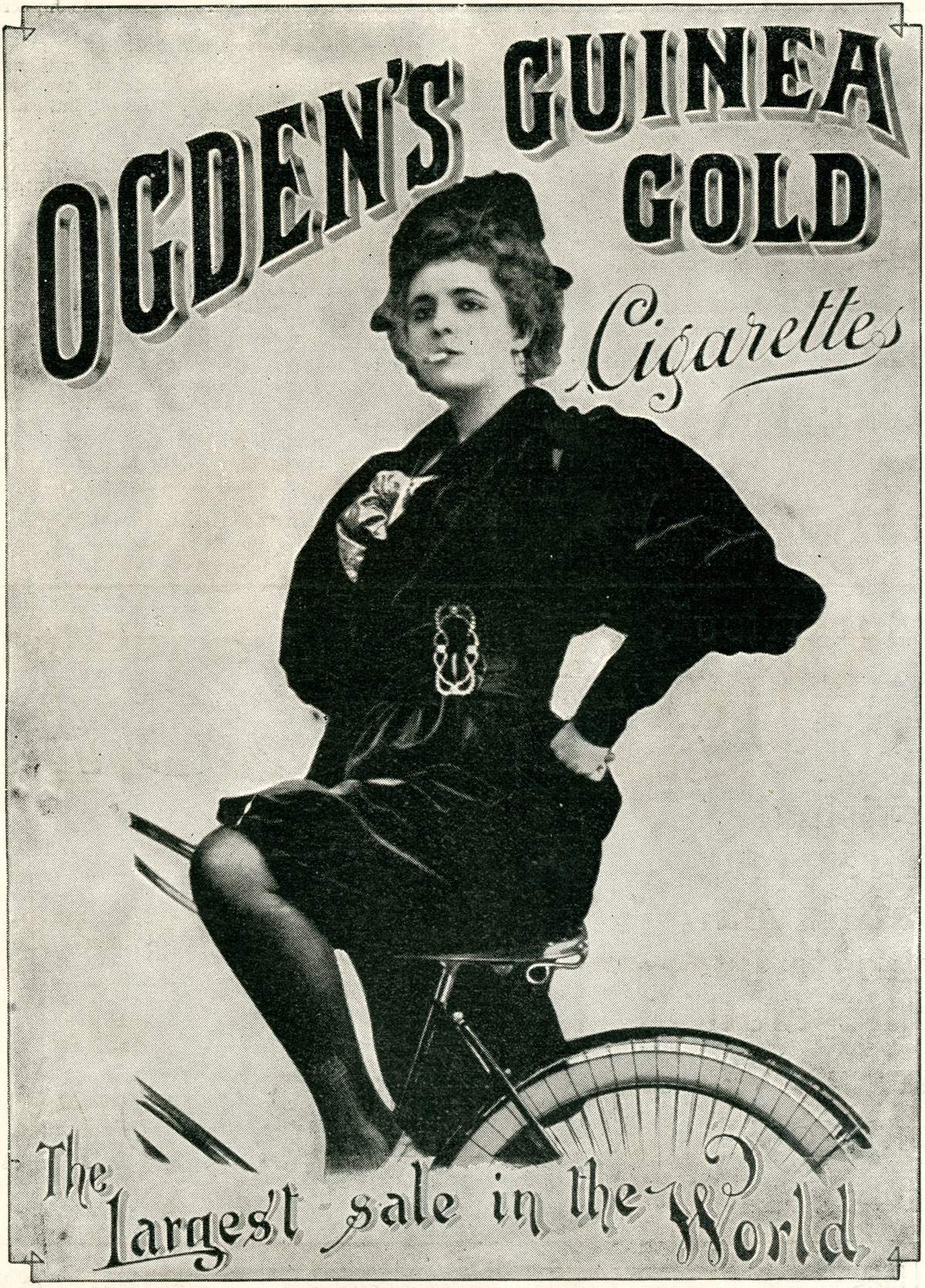
1900 cigarette ad

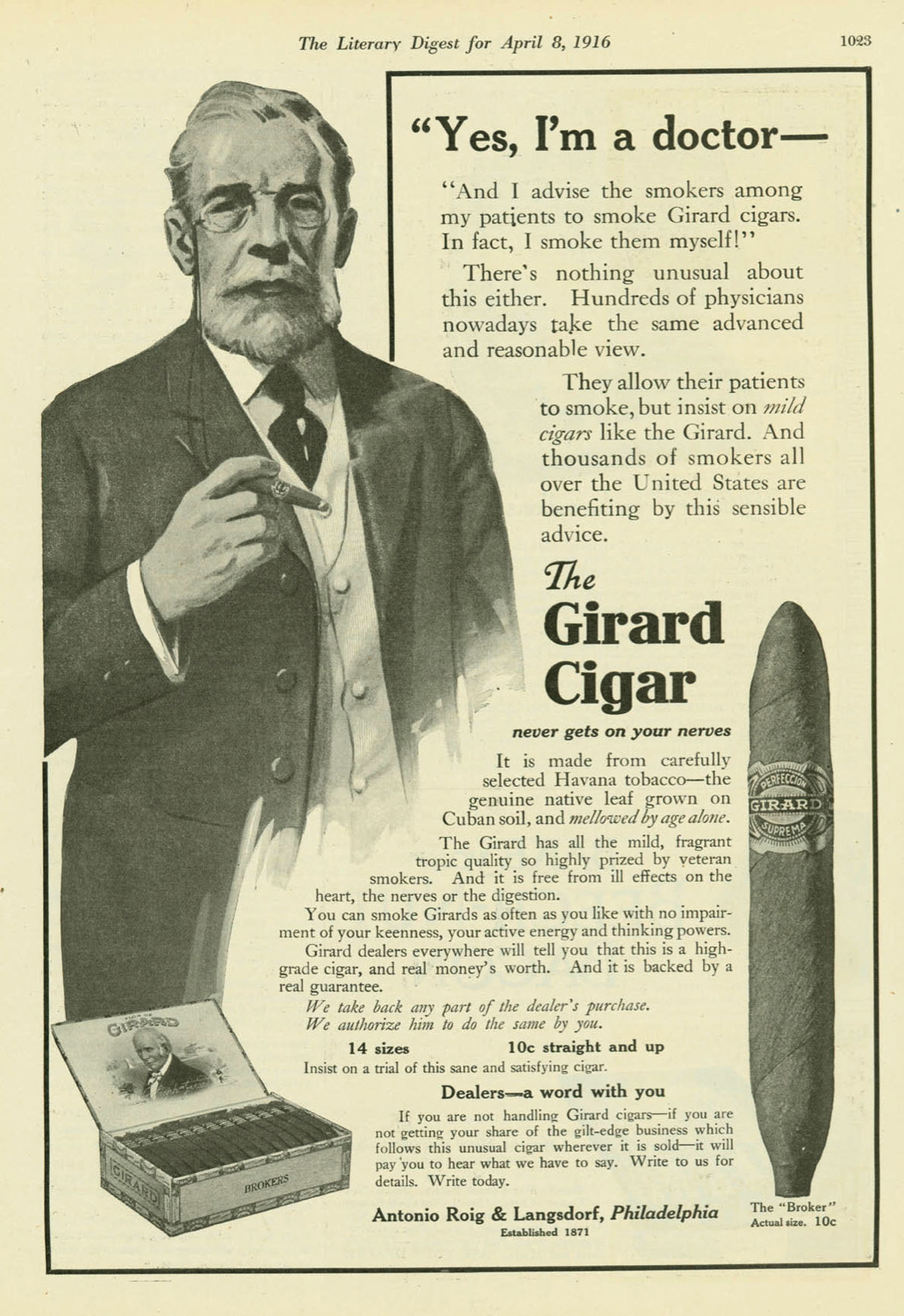
1916 ad showing a fictional doctor endorsing a cigar brand

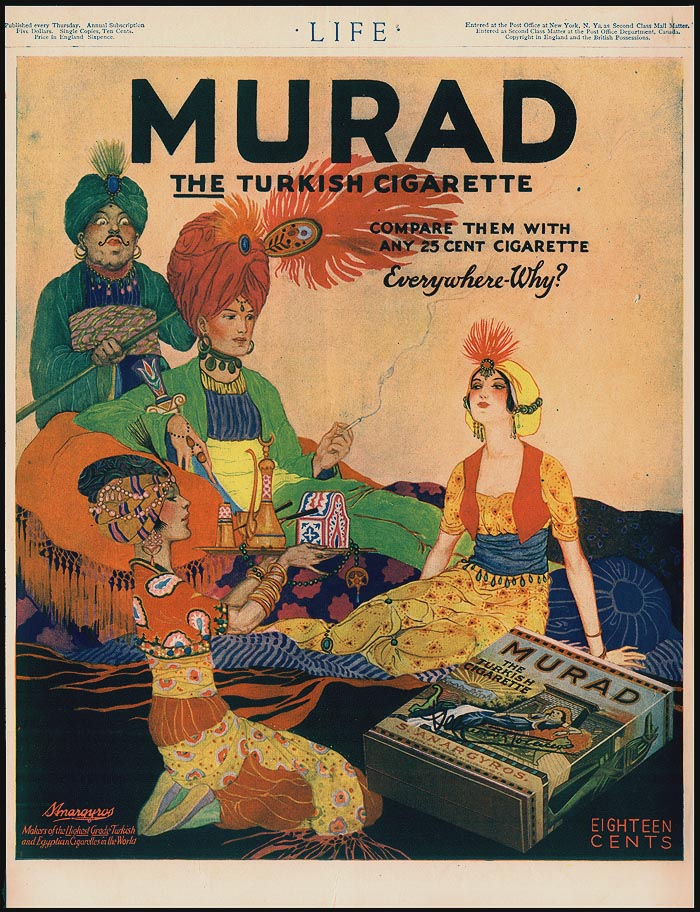
1918 advertisement for "Turkish" cigarettes

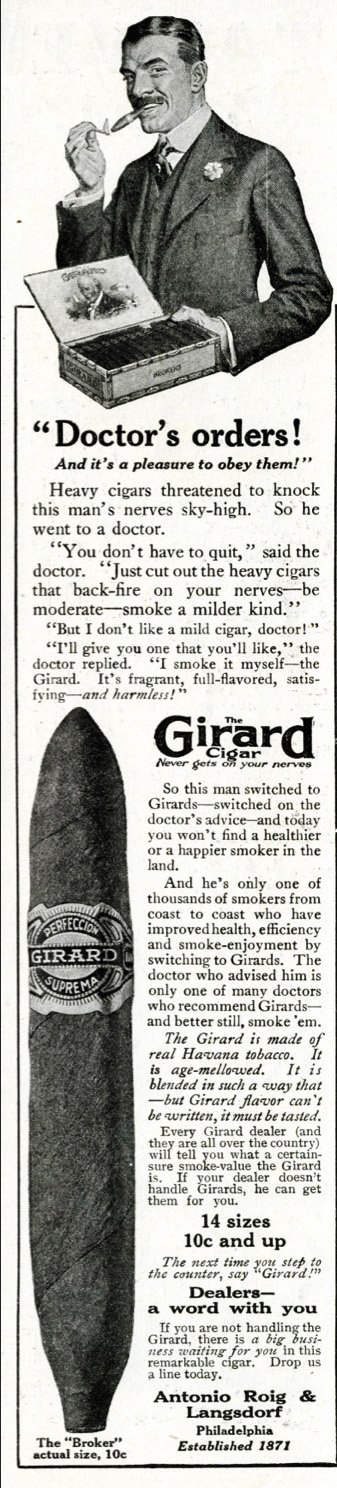
1921 cigar ad claiming that a fictional doctor called this brand "harmless" and "never gets on your nerves" (a term then used for nicotine withdrawal symptoms)

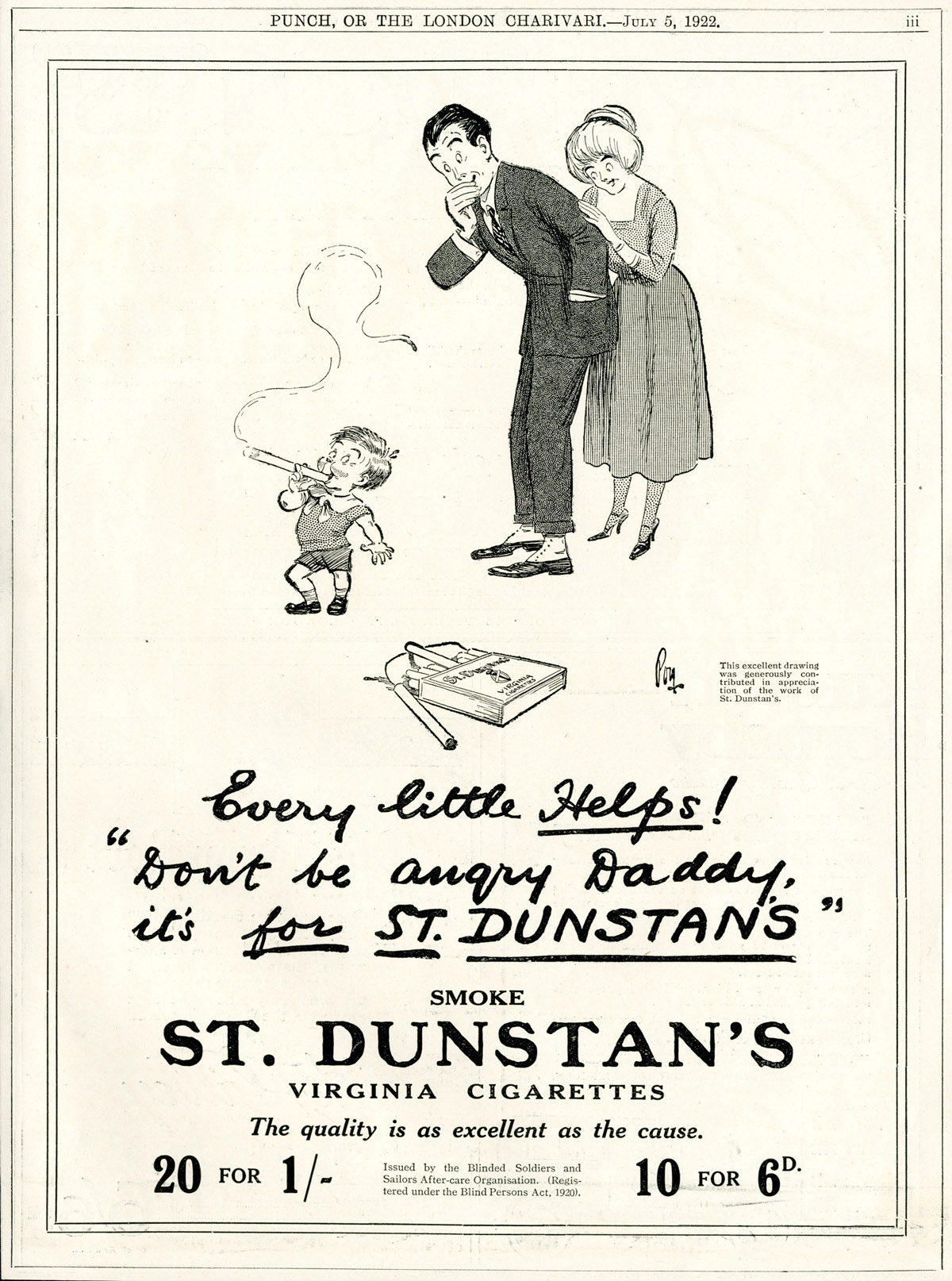
In a 1922 ad, a small child, smoking a cigarette, tells his amused parents not to worry, as he is smoking for a veteran's charity. Children were often used in early cigarette ads, where they helped normalize smoking as part of family living, and gave associations of purity, vibrancy, and life.

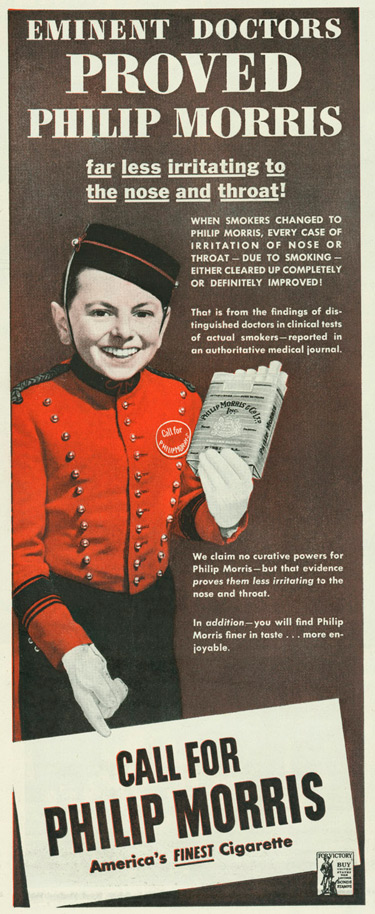
"We claim no curative powers for Phillip Morris" say this 1943 ad, in the small text.

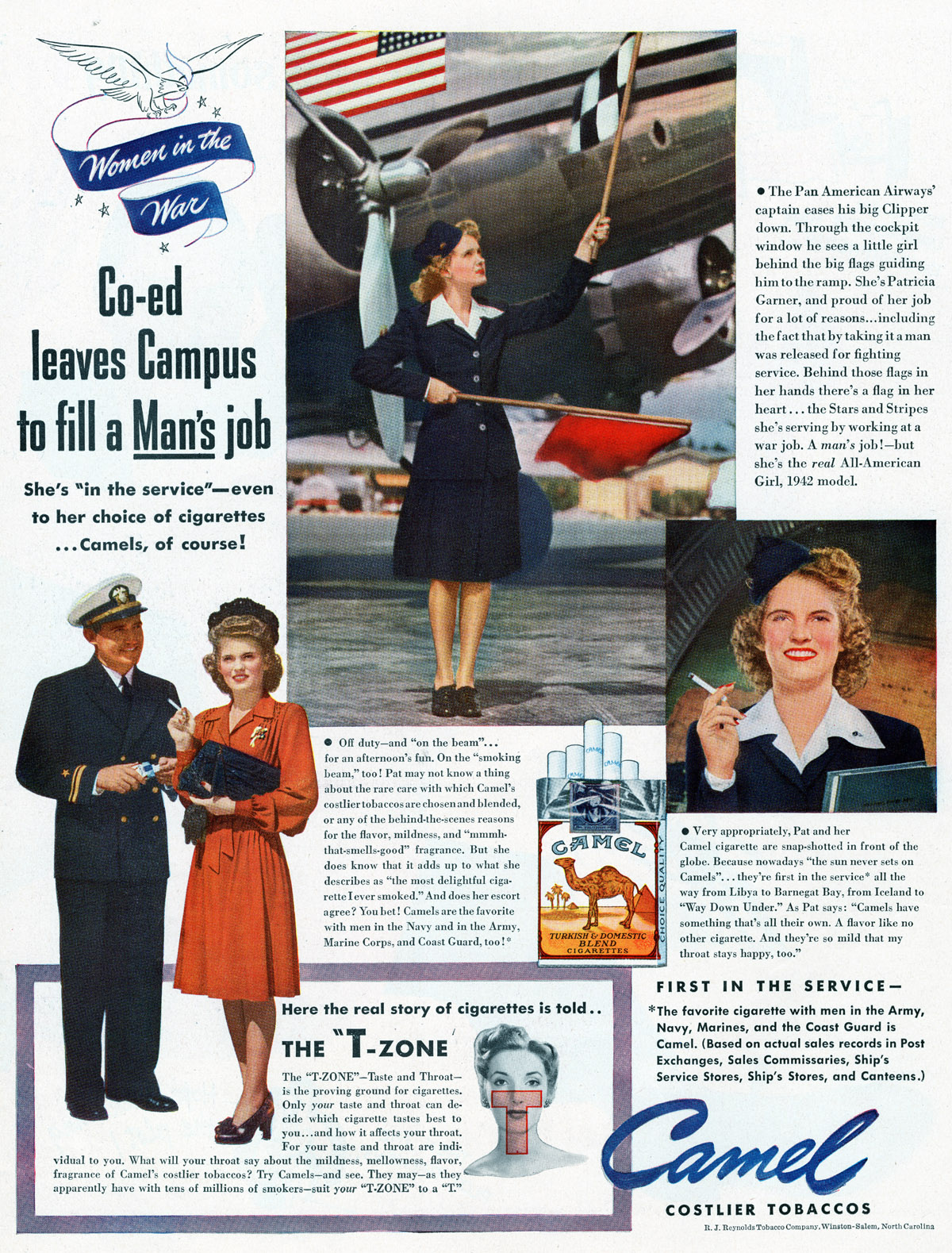
Women in the War cigarette ad showing a woman signalling civilian aircraft. The ad associates taking a "man's job" with smoking cigarettes like a man: "Co-ed leaves Campus to fill a Man's job. She's "in the service"—even to her choice of cigarettes..."

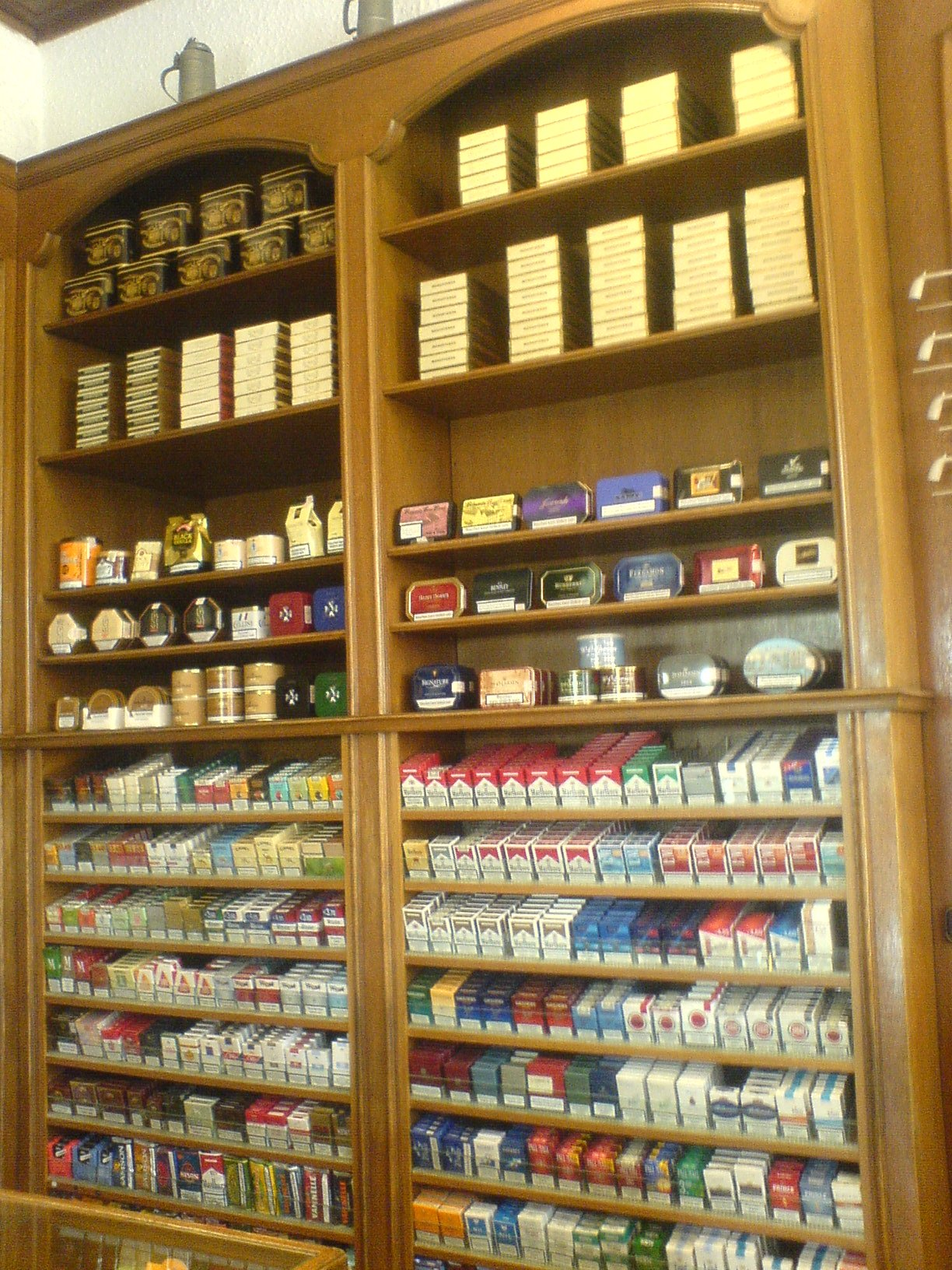
Tobacco display in a store Munich in 2008

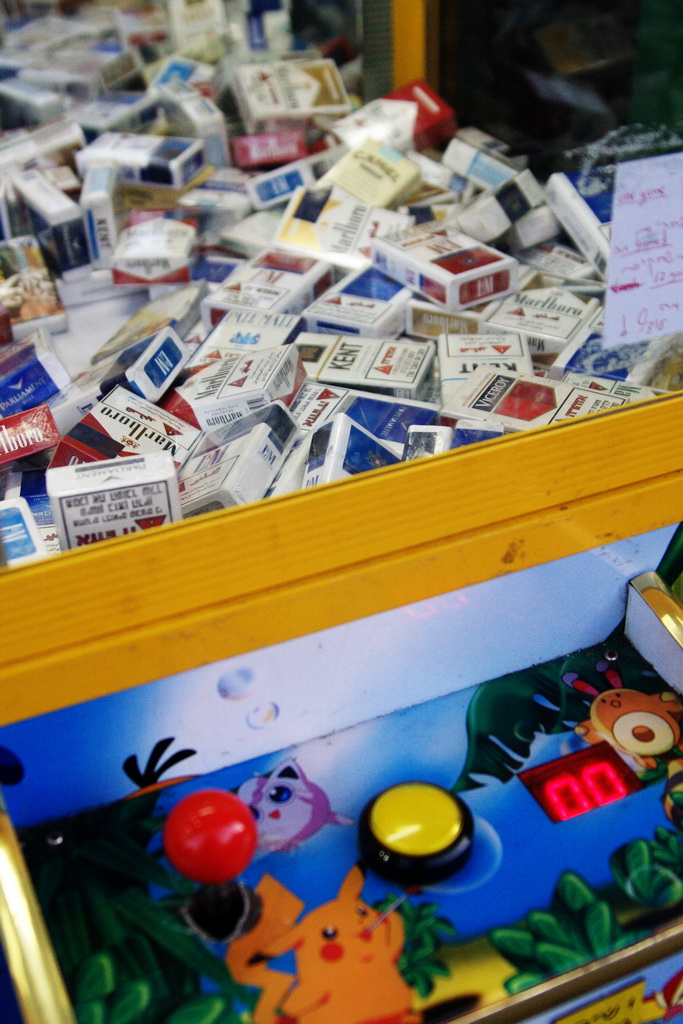
Cigarettes in a Pokémon-branded claw crane arcade game in 2008 in Jaffa, Israel

Cigarette commercial, New Zealand, 1925

Lucky Strike cigarette commercial

Muriel cigars commercial.
