= Anti-tobacco movement in Nazi Germany =

A Nazi-era anti-smoking ad titled "The chain-smoker" reading: "He does not devour it, it devours him" (from the anti-tobacco publication Reine Luft, 1941;23:90)

In the early 20th century, German researchers found additional evidence linking smoking to health harms, which strengthened the anti-tobacco movement in the Weimar Republic and led to a state-supported anti-smoking campaign. Early anti-tobacco movements grew in many nations from the middle of the 19th century. The 1933–1945 anti-tobacco campaigns in Nazi Germany have been widely publicized, although stronger laws than those passed in Germany were passed in some American states, the UK, and elsewhere between 1890 and 1930. After 1941, anti-tobacco campaigns were restricted by the Nazi government.

The German movement was the most powerful anti-smoking movement in the world during the 1930s and early 1940s. However, tobacco control policy was incoherent and ineffective, with uncoordinated and often regional efforts by many actors. Obvious measures were not taken, and existing measures were not enforced. Some Nazi leaders condemned smoking and several of them openly criticized tobacco consumption, but others publicly smoked and denied that it was harmful.

There was much research on smoking and its effects on health during Nazi rule, and it was the most important of its type at that time. A directly supported tobacco research institute produced work of only marginal scientific importance, but substantial academic work was done privately, with little to negative official support.

Adolf Hitler's personal distaste for tobacco and the Nazi reproductive policies were among the motivating factors behind the Nazi campaigns against smoking. The Nazi anti-tobacco campaign included banning smoking in trams, buses, and city trains, promoting health education, limiting cigarette rations in the Wehrmacht, organizing medical lectures for soldiers, and raising the tobacco tax. The Nazis also imposed restrictions on tobacco advertising and smoking in public spaces, and regulated restaurants and coffeehouses. However, these measures were widely circumvented or ignored.

The movement did not reduce the number of smokers. Tobacco use increased rapidly in the early years of the Nazi regime, between 1933 and 1939. The number of smokers increased from 1939 to 1945, but cigarette consumption declined; rationing towards the end of the war and post-war poverty meant that the increasing numbers of smokers could not buy as many cigarettes. Nazi-related nicotine marketing messages have often been used to oppose tobacco control, and criticized for historical inaccuracy. Even by the end of the 20th century, the anti-smoking movement in Germany had not attained the influence of the Nazi anti-smoking campaign. Germany has some of the weakest tobacco control measures in Europe, and German tobacco research has been described as "muted".

== Prelude ==
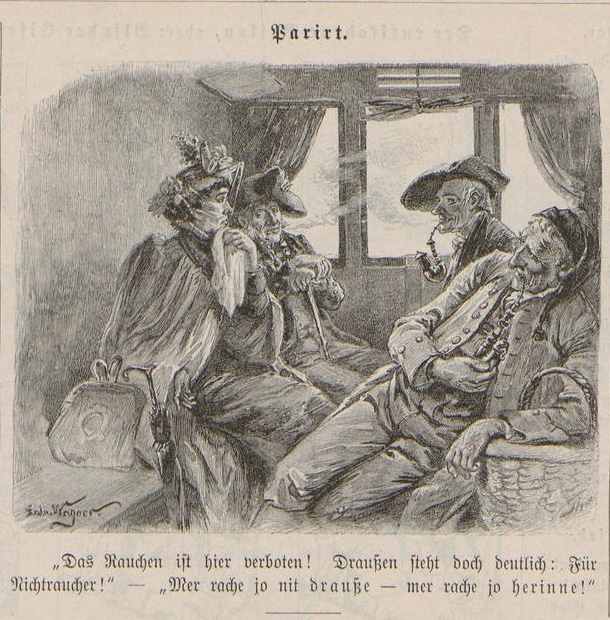
An 1898 cartoon on a smoking ban on a train. Woman: Smoking isn't allowed in this compartment, it clearly says "For non-smokers" outside! Smoker: But we aren't smoking outside, we're smoking inside!

Anti-smoking measures have a long history in German-speaking areas. For instance, in 1840, the Prussian government reinstated a ban on smoking in public places. The 1880s invention of automated cigarette-making machinery in the American South made it possible to mass-produce cigarettes at low cost, and smoking became common in Western countries. This led to a backlash and a tobacco prohibition movement, which challenged tobacco use as harmful and brought about some bans on tobacco sale and use.

The German Empire also had anti-tobacco sentiment in the early 20th century. Critics of smoking organized the first anti-tobacco group in the country, named the Deutscher Tabakgegnerverein zum Schutze der Nichtraucher (German Tobacco Opponents' Association for the Protection of Non-smokers). Established in 1904, this organization existed for only a brief period. The next anti-tobacco organization, the Bund Deutscher Tabakgegner (Federation of German Tobacco Opponents), was established in 1910 in Trautenau, Bohemia. Other anti-smoking organizations were established in 1912 in the cities of Hanover and Dresden.

After World War I, anti-tobacco movements continued in the German Weimar Republic, against a background of increasing medical research. German researchers were heavily involved with early research into tobacco harms. In the 1920s and 1930s, the Weimar Republic was at the cutting edge of tobacco research.

In 1920, a Bund Deutscher Tabakgegner in der Tschechoslowakei (Federation of German Tobacco Opponents in Czechoslovakia) was formed in Prague, after Czechoslovakia was separated from Austria at the end of World War I. A Bund Deutscher Tabakgegner in Deutschösterreich (Federation of German Tobacco Opponents in German Austria) was established in Graz in 1920. These groups published journals advocating nonsmoking. The first such German language journal was Der Tabakgegner (The Tobacco Opponent), published by the Bohemian organization between 1912 and 1932. Deutscher Tabakgegner (German Tobacco Opponent) was published in Dresden from 1919 to 1935, and was the second journal on this subject. Anti-tobacco organizations were often also against consumption of alcoholic beverages.

== Research ==
Research on tobacco's effects on population health were more advanced in Germany than in any other nation by the time the Nazis came to power. While a link between smoking and cancers had been observed as early as the 1700s, the first good statistical evidence that linked smoking to lung cancer and other illnesses was published in Germany and eastern Europe before the Nazi takeover (though some sources claim that the link between lung cancer and tobacco was first proven in Nazi Germany). Physicians were also aware that smoking was responsible for cardiac diseases, which were considered to be the most serious disease resulting from smoking. Use of nicotine was sometimes considered to be responsible for increased reports of myocardial infarction in the country. In the later years of World War II, researchers considered nicotine a factor behind the coronary heart failures suffered by a significant number of military personnel in the Eastern Front. A pathologist of the Heer examined thirty-two young soldiers who had died from myocardial infarction at the front, and documented in a 1944 report that all of them were "enthusiastic smokers". He cited the opinion of pathologist Franz Buchner that cigarettes are "a coronary poison of the first order".

The term "passive smoking" ("Passivrauchen") was coined in Nazi Germany, by Fritz Lickint, a researcher purged from his public position by the Nazis in 1934 for political reasons. While in private practice, Lickint continued his research. In 1935 he published Der Bronchialkrebs der Raucher ("Bronchial cancer in smokers"), a follow-up to his 1930 review, Tabak und Tabakrauch als ätiologische Faktoren des Carcinoms ("Tobacco and tobacco smoke as aetiological factors in carcinoma"). The 1935 review attributed the rapidly-rising rates of cancers of the airway to smoking. In 1939 Lickint published Tabak und Organismus ("Tobacco and the body"), a book that ran to over 1,200 pages, giving a definitive review of existing research into the physiological effects of tobacco. It described smoking as a cause of cancers, cardiovascular diseases, changes in blood composition, lowered fertility, and mutations. It described nicotine use as an addiction, likening it to alcoholism and suggesting similar treatments. It also suggested anti-smoking public health measures, including measures against passive smoking. Lickint was in military service from 1939 to 1945; he survived and continued his research after the war.

Further observational studies were done in Nazi Germany and the wartime Netherlands. Nazi Germany supported epidemiological research on the harmful effects of tobacco use. Hitler personally gave financial support to the Wissenschaftliches Institut zur Erforschung der Tabakgefahren (Scientific Institute for the Research into the Hazards of Tobacco) at the University of Jena, in Thuringia, headed by Karl Astel. Established in 1941, it was the most significant anti-tobacco institute in Nazi Germany. However, it never had its own buildings or staff, nor regular funding, and overall its research into the dangers of tobacco was limited, and only of marginal scientific significance and repute. Further research into the effects of tobacco on health was carried out with Nazi funding. In 1939, Franz H. Müller (a member of the National Socialist Motor Corps or NSKK, and the Nazi Party) published a study reporting a higher prevalence of lung cancer among smokers. The study had serious weaknesses in its methodology, but study design problems were better addressed in subsequent studies. Dietrich Eberhard Schairer also used case-control epidemiological methods to study lung cancer among smokers, in 1943. Due to the research institute and local political support, including from Fritz Sauckel (the Gauleiter of Thuringia) and Leonardo Conti (the Reich Health Leader), Thuringia became a test bed for anti-smoking measures, most of which were never implemented elsewhere.

After 1941, Nazi tobacco research was deliberately slowed, along with other restrictions on anti-tobacco publications. At the end of the war, the fates of those involved in supporting and carrying out research varied. Karl Astel, who was heavily involved in mass murder and research practices which would probably have seen him tried as a war criminal, killed himself. Fritz Sauckel was executed for crimes against humanity. Leonardo Conti killed himself while awaiting trial for his involvement in mass murder of ill people. Hans Reiter (the Reich Health Office president) was interned for two years and spent the rest of his career in private practice. Others worked in the field after the war; pharmacologist Gustav Kuschinsky continued work similar to that begun with funding from Astel's institute with funding from the cigarette company Reemtsma. Fritz Lickint was appointed to public hospital and teaching posts again after the war.

Many wartime research publications were never shipped abroad, and after the war, pre-war and wartime publications on nicotine were ignored even within Germany. Post-war researchers were unaware of the earlier non-English-language studies. They therefore duplicated the case-control studies showing the association with illness before doing prospective cohort studies that established causality in the 1950s. There is a popular belief that American and British scientists first discovered the health harms of tobacco in the 1950s.

== Political motives ==
=== Hitler's attitude towards smoking ===
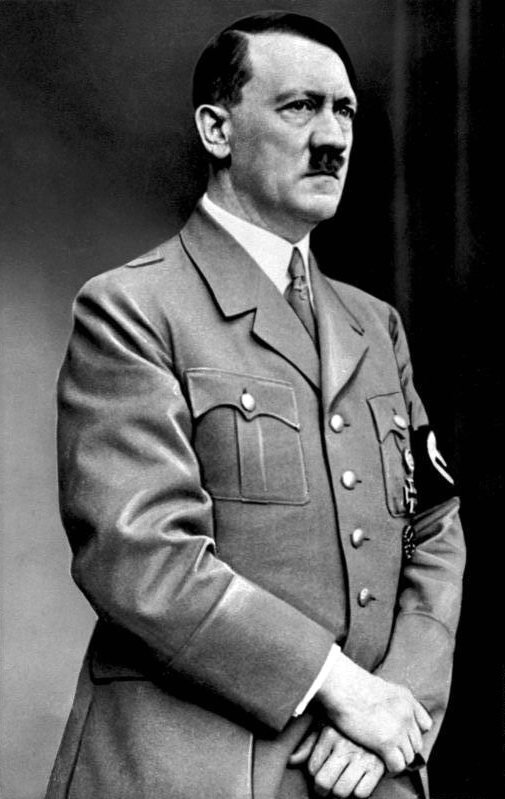
Hitler encouraged his close associates to quit smoking.

Hitler viewed smoking as "decadent" and "the wrath of the Red Man against the White Man, vengeance for having been given hard liquor", lamenting that "so many excellent men have been lost to tobacco poisoning". He was unhappy because both Eva Braun and Martin Bormann were smokers and was concerned over Hermann Göring's continued smoking in public places. He was angered when a statue portraying a cigar-smoking Göring was commissioned. Hitler is often considered to be the first national leader to advocate nonsmoking; however, James VI and I, king of Scotland and England, was openly against smoking 330 years prior, and the near-contemporary 1600s Chinese emperors Chongzhen and Kangxi both decreed the death penalty for smokers.

Hitler disapproved of the military personnel's freedom to smoke, and during World War II he said on 2 March 1942, "it was a mistake, traceable to the army leadership at the time, at the beginning of the war". He also said that it was "not correct to say that a soldier cannot live without smoking". He promised to end the use of tobacco in the military after the end of the war. Hitler personally encouraged close friends not to smoke. He even began to offer a gold watch to any of his inner circle who could quit. However, Hitler's personal distaste for tobacco was only one of several catalysts behind the anti-smoking campaign.

=== Reproductive and health policies ===
The Nazi reproductive policies were a significant factor behind their anti-tobacco campaign. The Nazi leadership wanted German women to have as many children as possible. Articles and a major medical book published in the 1930s observed an association between smoking (in both men and women) and lower fertility, including more miscarriages. The idea that male fertility was also affected by smoking was not a new one at that time. An article published in a German gynecology journal in 1943 stated that women smoking three or more cigarettes per day were more likely to remain childless compared to nonsmoking women. Martin Staemmler, a prominent physician during the Nazi era, said that smoking by pregnant women resulted in a higher rate of stillbirths and miscarriages (a claim supported by modern research, for nicotine-using mothers, fathers, and their offspring). This view was also promoted in a 1936 book by well-known female racial hygienist Agnes Bluhm.

Women who smoked were viewed as unsuitable to be wives and mothers in a German family. Werner Huttig of the Nazi Party's Rassenpolitisches Amt (Office of Racial Politics) said that a smoking mother's breast milk contained nicotine, a claim that modern research has proven correct. Smoking women were also considered to be vulnerable to premature aging and loss of physical attractiveness (smoking's effects on the skin were studied at the time; smoking does make the skin age faster and was known by 1940 to be linked to earlier death).

There was also concern that mutations caused by cigarette smoking would have irreversible long-term effects on the genetics of the population. Tobacco was described as a "genetic poison" (see epigenetic effects of smoking for modern research). In Nazi rhetoric, these concerns were connected to racist theories about the "German germ plasm".

Measures protecting non-smokers (especially children and mothers) from passive smoking were tied to the Nazi's desire for healthy young soldiers and workers. They were tied to the concepts of Volksgesundheit (People's Health) and Gesundheitspflicht (Duty to be Healthy). Physical fitness was promoted, and tobacco use was discouraged as incompatible with physical fitness. Antismoking campaigns were accompanied by other health campaigns, such as discouraging the consumption of alcohol (especially during pregnancy) and encouraging the eating of fruit, vegetables, and whole-wheat bread.

=== Economic and antisemitic reasons ===
The Nazi Sturmabteilung was funded by royalties from its own cigarette company, with which it is strongly associated in this ad.

In the 1920s, many German cigarette firms went bankrupt; further, the market was increasingly dominated by a few large, highly automated manufacturers. By 1933, with high unemployment, the Nazi party was attacking the tobacco industry for having foreign and Jewish connections, and for competing with the Nazi party's own cigarette company.

== Measures ==
Reine Luft, the main journal of the anti-tobacco movement, used puns and cartoons in its propaganda, such as stating that smoking was a thing of the devil (a "Teufelszeug").

There was never a coherent Nazi policy to impede smoking. Mostly, measures were based on pre-existing policies. Although in some places some stern measures were taken, tobacco control policy was incoherent and ineffective, and obvious measures were not taken. Tobacco controls were often not enforced. Smoking bans were widely ignored. Measures reached their peak in 1939–1941, after which some were rolled back or actively prevented.

There was great regional variation in tobacco policies, making it possible to find wildly contradictory individual examples. Almost no anti-smoking efforts were made in Nazi Austria, for instance. In Jena, Thuringia, very strong anti-smoking measures were enacted, due to the power of Karl Astel there and his support from Fritz Sauckel (the Gauleiter of Thuringia) and Leonardo Conti (the Reich Health Leader). These measures included the first 20th-century university campus smoking ban. There were many small, local anti-tobacco measures, which were often unapproved and viewed negatively by the Nazi Party.

The Nazi anti-tobacco policies were not free of contradictions. For example, the Volksgesundheit (People's Health) and Gesundheitspflicht (Duty to be Healthy) policies were enforced in parallel with the active distribution of cigarettes to people whom the Nazis saw as "deserving" groups (e.g. frontline soldiers, members of the Hitler Youth). On the other hand, "undeserving" and stigmatized groups (Jews, war prisoners) were denied access to tobacco.

=== Propaganda ===
The Nazis used several public relations tactics to convince the general population of Germany not to smoke, and gave variable support to non-officially-approved propaganda. National and local government organizations, party-controlled organizations, voluntary organizations, and medical organizations were all involved. The messages differed; propaganda by Nazi Party organizations generally described tobacco as harmful to women or young people, while publications by medical professionals tended to describe the health hazards of smoking. In 1941, the propaganda ministry issued orders to "completely cease any anti-tobacco propaganda in the public", with minor exceptions, which had to be submitted for censorship.

The Public Health Office repeatedly made precise public statements about the health harms of smoking (under both Gerhard Wagner and his successor, Leonardo Conti). The Reich Health Office also issued warnings, and the Reich Bureau Against the Dangers of Alcohol and Tobacco was founded. In 1939, a Bureau against the Dangers of Alcohol and Tobacco was formed. The anti-smoking campaign undertaken by the Nazis also included health education.

The German Labor Front (the government monopoly union) also ran anti-smoking campaigns. An anti-smoking speech by its head met with official disapproval. Anti-smoking messages were sent to the people in their workplaces, often with the help of the Hitler Youth (HJ) and the League of German Girls (BDM).

Well-known health magazines like the Gesundes Volk (Healthy People), Volksgesundheit (People's Health) and Gesundes Leben (Healthy Life) also published warnings about the health consequences of smoking and posters showing the harmful effects of tobacco were displayed. Some anti-smoking posters were unapproved and censured by the government. Editorials discussing the issue of smoking and its effects were published in newspapers. Articles advocating nonsmoking were also published in the magazines Die Genussgifte (The Recreational Stimulants), Auf der Wacht (On the Guard) and Reine Luft (Clean Air). Out of these magazines, Reine Luft was the main journal of the anti-tobacco movement. Karl Astel's Institute for Tobacco Hazards Research at Jena University purchased and distributed hundreds of reprints from Reine Luft. The magazine was published by tobacco control activists; it was later, in 1941, ordered by the propaganda ministry to moderate its tone and submit all material for pre-approval.

Restrictions were imposed on the advertisement of tobacco products, enacted on 7 December 1941 and signed by Heinrich Hunke, the President of the Advertising Council. Advertisements trying to depict smoking as harmless or as an expression of masculinity were banned. Ridiculing anti-tobacco activists was also outlawed, as was the use of advertising posters along rail tracks, in rural regions, stadiums and racing tracks. Advertising by loudspeakers and mail was also prohibited. A ban on tobacco advertising was decided against by Max Amann (Hitler's secretary, Reich Leader for the Press, and Leader of the Party Publishing Company, Eher Verlag). However, advertising restrictions remained in place, even after 1941, and there was a plan to tighten them, although proposals to restrict tobacco ads to statements of manufacturer, brand, and price were explicitly rejected by the party.

=== Nichtraucherschutz (the protection of non-smokers) ===
Nichtraucherschutz, the protection of non-smokers (from passive smoking), was the principle behind some bans. In 1941, tobacco smoking in trams was outlawed in sixty German cities. In 1944, smoking in buses and city trains was made illegal, on the personal initiative of Hitler, who feared female ticket collectors might be the victims of passive smoking.

Smoking was also banned not only in health care institutions, but also in several public offices and in rest homes. Midwives were restricted from smoking while on duty. Smoking was also outlawed in bomb shelters; however, some shelters had separate rooms for smoking. In 1939, the Nazi Party outlawed smoking in all of its offices premises, and Heinrich Himmler, the then chief of the Schutzstaffel (SS), restricted police personnel from smoking while they were on duty. In 1938, the Reichspost imposed a ban on smoking. However, despite public encouragement against smoking, bans on smoking were seldom enforced and were ineffective. Among Nazi leadership, Hermann Goering smoked cigars, and Himmler and Joseph Goebbels smoked cigarettes, as did Magda Goebbels and Eva Braun, Hitler's romantic partner.

=== Women and children ===
Special care was taken to discourage pregnant women and youth from smoking. The president of the Medical Association in Germany announced, "German women don't smoke". Pregnant women, and women below the age of 25 and over the age of 55, were not given tobacco ration cards during World War II. Restrictions on selling tobacco products to women were imposed on the hospitality and food retailing industry, though restrictions on women smoking in restaurants were officially rejected by the Nazi party. Anti-tobacco films aimed at women were publicly shown. Some local measures were quite strict; for instance, one district department of the National Socialist Factory Cell Organization (NSBO) announced that it would expel female members who smoked publicly. Some women working in arms factories, however, were given special cigarette rations.

Smoking was also banned inside many schools. In July 1943, public smoking for persons under the age of 18 was outlawed, although under-18s were still allowed to purchase and privately smoke tobacco. The US and UK had less lenient regulations.

=== Military regulations ===
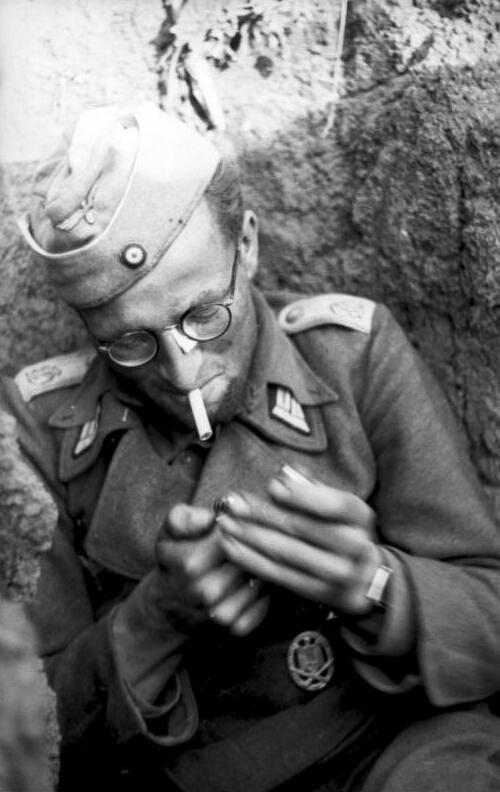
A Wehrmacht soldier smokes in a trench in Romania, 1943.

Restrictions on smoking were also introduced in the Wehrmacht. Soldiers were not issued with more than six free cigarettes per day. Extra cigarettes were often sold to the soldiers, especially when there was no military advance or retreat in the battleground; however, these were restricted to 50 for each person per month. Non-smokers could receive alternative rations, such as food and chocolate. Teenaged soldiers serving in the 12th SS Panzer Division Hitlerjugend, composed of Hitler Youth members, were given confectionery instead of tobacco products, although other Hitler Youth members were given cigarettes. The Wehrmacht's female auxiliary personnel were not given cigarette rations. Medical lectures were arranged to persuade military personnel to quit smoking.

In 1938, the Luftwaffe imposed a ban on smoking. In 1939, Heinrich Himmler, the then chief of the Schutzstaffel (SS), restricted police personnel and SS officers from smoking while they were on duty. The JAMA also reported that Hermann Göring had banned soldiers from smoking when on the streets, on marches, or only briefly off-duty.

== Countermeasures and obstacles ==
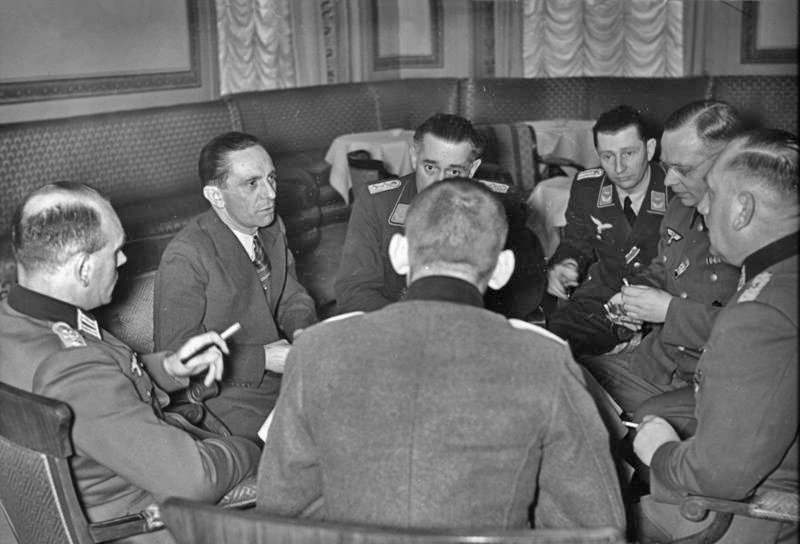
Cigarettes are present as propaganda minister Joseph Goebbels meets with the heads of military propaganda units, January 1941. Later the same year, the ministry issued orders to "completely cease any anti-tobacco propaganda in the public" (with minor exceptions).

Tobacco companies represented themselves as strong and early supporters of the Nazi cause. They made unparalleled financial contributions to Nazi causes; the Sturmabteilung and other party organizations were repeatedly given six-figure sums, and the Hitler Youth were given an aircraft. One cigarette company paid over 12.3 million reichsmarks in bribes to Hermann Göring. The Nazi SA founded its own cigarette company, and violently promoted its own brands, breaking into stores that did not stock them and assaulting shopkeepers.

Some senior Nazi officials were opposed to anti-tobacco measures. Hermann Goering publicly smoked cigars, despite Hitler's opposition. Joseph Goebbels felt that cigarettes were essential to the war effort, and (as propaganda minister) restricted anti-tobacco propaganda, arguing that anti-smoking campaigns were incompatible with free cigarettes being issued to millions serving in the military, legal tobacco advertising, and authority figures who smoked and denied the dangers of smoking. Despite government regulations, many women in Germany regularly smoked, including the wives of many high-ranking Nazi officials. For instance, Magda Goebbels smoked even while she was being interviewed by a journalist. Eva Braun also smoked.

The tobacco industry worked to counter the government campaign to prevent women from smoking and used smoking models in their advertisements. Fashion illustrations displaying women with cigarettes were often published in prominent publications such as the Beyers Mode für Alle (Beyers Fashion For All). The cover of the popular song Lili Marleen featured singer Lale Andersen holding a cigarette.

The cigarette manufacturing companies in Germany made several attempts to weaken the scientific credibility of the anti-tobacco campaign. They tried to depict the anti-tobacco movement as "fanatic" and "unscientific". They published new journals (with titles such as Chronica Nicotiana and Der Tabak: Wissenschaftliche Zeitschrift der Internationalen Tabakwissenschaftlichen Gesellschaft, or "Tobacco: the scientific journal of the International Tobacco Scientific Society"). One industry-funded tobacco counter-research institute, the Tabacologia medicinalis, was shut down by Reich Health Leader Leonardo Conti. Another such "academy" was called Academia Nicotiana Internationalis.

While some cigarette ads had been banned from Nazi party publications due to Jewish ownership, the publications lost money, and the early party needed money for election campaigning. In June 1932, Hitler personally made a deal for half a million marks worth of cigarette advertising.

== Economic pressures ==
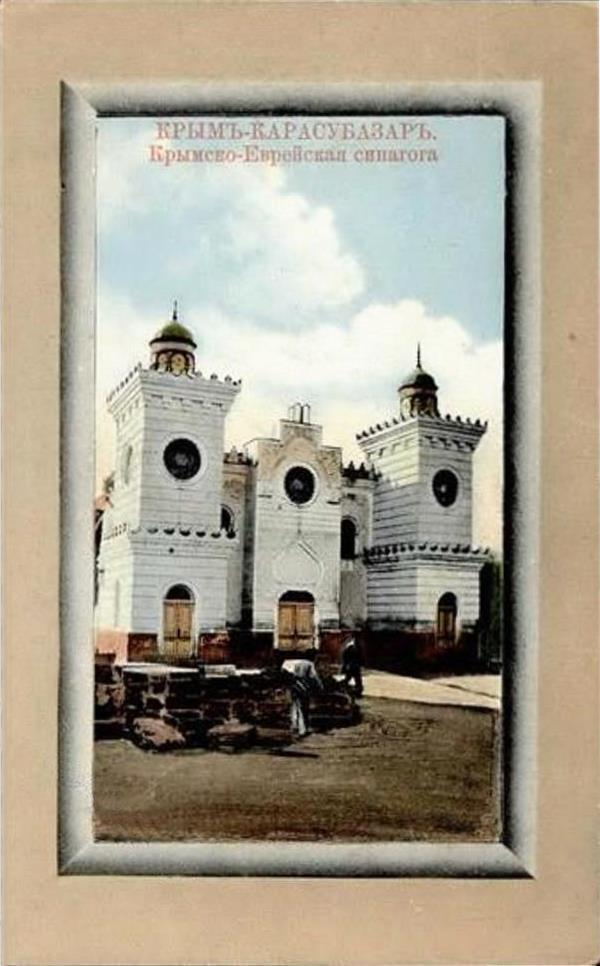
Krymchak Synagogue of Karasubazar (now called Bilohirsk), in the Crimea, in the first decade of the 20th century. Built in 1516, the synagogue was destroyed around 1941, and the building rebuilt, starting in 1942 or 1943, as a tobacco factory.

The Nazi paramilitary SA was funded by cigarette royalties. After the Night of the Long Knives, the Reemtsma cigarette company paid a fixed fee (a quarter-million marks for the first year) to produce the SA's permitted cigarettes. A plan to establish a state tobacco monopoly was not carried out.

Efforts were made to keep cigarettes freely available. In the inter-war period, cigarettes were made with tobacco from Greece, Bulgaria, and Turkey. Pipe tobacco and cigar tobacco often came from overseas, so the war disrupted their availability. The tobacco industry worked closely with occupying forces in the Crimea, where forced labour, including child labour, was used to harvest tobacco. Forced labour was used in cigarette manufacture, with prison camps set up at some locations. More cigarettes were made with less tobacco, to stretch the supply. Demand was also controlled; "undeserving" groups were forbidden to enter tobacconists, and later from buying tobacco.

An ordinance enacted on 3 November 1941 raised tobacco taxes by approximately 80–95% of the retail price. It would be the highest rise in tobacco taxes in Germany until more than 25 years after the collapse of the Nazi regime. By 1941, tobacco taxes made up about a twelfth of state income, and antismoking efforts were being discouraged.

Despite these efforts, in 1942 there was a shortage of tobacco, and two-thirds of all German tobacco factories were shut down, some to be converted into armaments factories. Tobacco went on the ration: smokers were not allowed to buy more than a limited amount. Cigarette consumption stopped rising rapidly and fell rapidly, although the number of smokers continued to rise.

== Effectiveness ==
The early anti-smoking campaign was considered a failure, and from 1933 to 1937 there was a rapid increase in tobacco consumption in Germany. The rate of smoking in the nation increased faster even than in neighboring France, where the anti-tobacco movement was tiny and far less influential. Between 1932 and 1939, per capita cigarette consumption in Germany increased from 570 to 900 per year, while the corresponding numbers for France were from 570 to 630. After 1938, the war prevented the publication of sales figures. Tobacco consumption rose until 1942, when tobacco went on the ration, due to supply shortages. The number of smokers continued to rise, but smokers could not buy as many cigarettes, so total tobacco consumption fell.

Free and subsidized branded cigarettes were distributed to soldiers on both sides during World War II, as part of rations. Smoking rates rose more rapidly during war than in peacetime, including among women. Serving in the military, participating in military deployments, and physical and mental disability all make people more likely to smoke. Generally, people who are already stressed, anxious, depressed, or otherwise suffering from poor moods become addicted more easily and find quitting more difficult. This is thought to be because nicotine withdrawal worsens mood in smokers, with a nicotine hit briefly bringing mood back to baseline; if, due to pre-existing mood problems, the baseline is lower, then the withdrawal is worse still.

Cigarette consumption per capita per year in Germany & the US
	Year			
	1930	1935	1940	1944
Germany	490	510	1,022	743
United States	1,485	1,564	1,976	3,039

Smoking was common in the Wehrmacht; a 1944 survey found that 87% of servicemen smoked. 10% of servicemen had begun smoking while in the military, and only seven servicemen of the thousand surveyed (0.7%) had given it up. However, as in the general population, the number of smokers rose while the number of cigarettes smoked fell. As a result of the anti-tobacco measures implemented in the Wehrmacht (supply restriction, taxes, and propaganda), the total tobacco consumption by soldiers decreased between 1939 and 1945. Average tobacco consumption per person among military personnel declined by 23.4% compared to the immediate pre-World War II years. The number of servicemen who smoked 30 or more cigarettes per day (well above the theoretical maximum military ration of 7.7 cigarettes per day) (Note: A ration of six cigarettes per day, plus a maximum purchase of 50 per month of 29.5 days, gives a maximum of 7.7 cigarettes per day) declined from 4.4% to 0.3%.

== Association with antisemitism and racism ==
Apart from public health concerns, the Nazis were heavily influenced by ideology; specifically, the movement was influenced by concepts of "racial hygiene" and bodily purity. Some Nazi leaders believed that it was wrong for the "master race" to smoke and that tobacco consumption was equal to "racial degeneracy". Tobacco-caused infertility and hereditary damage (described in now-obsolete terms as "corrupt[ion]" of the "germ plasm") were considered problematic by the Nazis on the grounds that they harmed German "racial hygiene".

Nazi anti-tobacco activists often tried to depict tobacco as a vice of "the degenerate Negroes". The Nazis claimed that Jews were responsible for introducing tobacco and its harmful effects. The Seventh-day Adventist Church in Germany announced that smoking was an unhealthy vice spread by Jews. During the opening ceremony of the aforementioned Wissenschaftliches Institut zur Erforschung der Tabakgefahren in 1941, Johann von Leers, editor of the Nordische Welt (Nordic World), proclaimed that "Jewish capitalism" was responsible for the spread of tobacco use across Europe. He said that the first tobacco on German soil was brought by the Jews and that they controlled the tobacco industry in Amsterdam, the principal European entry point of Nicotiana.

== After World War II ==
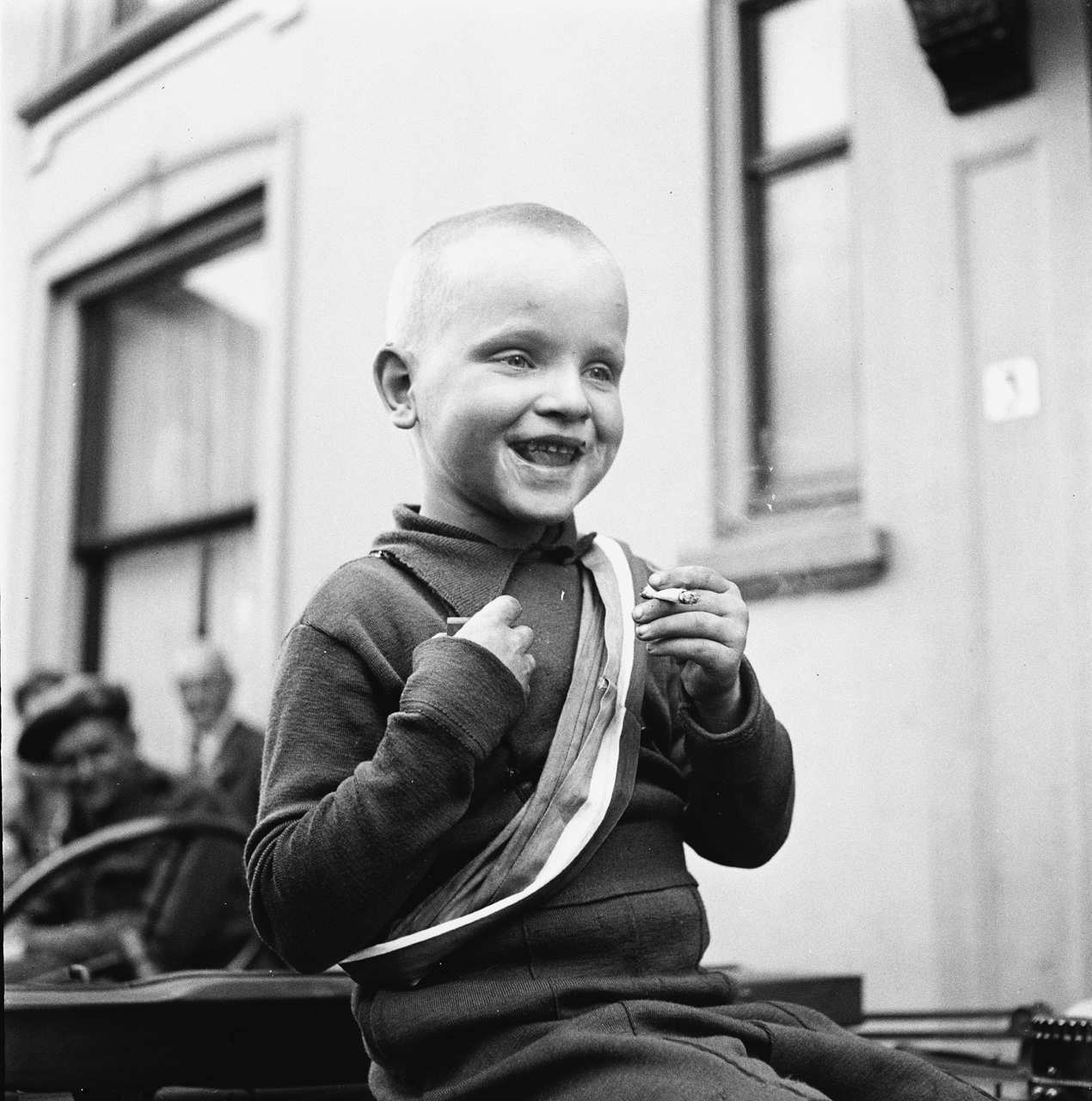
At the end of WWII, a Dutch child celebrates liberation by smoking a cigarette.

After the collapse of Nazi Germany at the end of World War II, illegal smuggling of tobacco became prevalent, and the anti-smoking campaign started by the Nazis ceased to exist. In 1949, approximately 400 million cigarettes manufactured in the United States entered Germany illegally every month. In 1954, nearly two billion Swiss cigarettes were smuggled into Germany and Italy. As part of the Marshall Plan, the United States paid to send tobacco to Germany free of charge; the amount of tobacco shipped into Germany in 1948 was 24,000 tons and was as high as 69,000 tons in 1949. Post-war consumption in Germany remained initially low, due to poverty. As this poverty gave way to the Wirtschaftswunder, per capita yearly cigarette consumption in post-war Germany steadily rose from 460 in 1950 to 1,523 in 1963.

Nazi-related rhetoric associating anti-smoking measures with fascism has been fairly widely used in nicotine marketing (except in Germany, where such comparisons have brought strong reactions). Historical research has been quoted in a selective manner, which has been criticized by the quoted historians. In the early 21st century, this Nazi rhetoric may be being supplanted by Taliban-related rhetoric associating anti-smoking measures with theocracy.

It has been argued that the Nazi anti-tobacco campaigns delayed effective nicotine addiction reduction measures by decades. At the end of the 20th century, the anti-tobacco campaign in Germany was unable to approach the level of the Nazi-era climax in the years 1939–41, and German tobacco health research was described by Robert N. Proctor as "muted". Modern Germany has some of Europe's least restrictive tobacco control policies, and more Germans both smoke and die of it in consequence, which also leads to higher public health costs.

== See also ==
- Animal welfare in Nazi Germany
- Health effects of tobacco § History
- History of nicotine marketing § 1914–1950
- Fritz Lickint
- Sturm-Zigaretten (the Nazi Party's cigarette company)
