= Sturm Cigarette Company =

Defunct Nazi cigarette company

An advertisement from January 1932, when the Nazis were trying to win power, showing a uniformed SA member, the Nazi swastika, the SA logo, and an anti-monopoly political slogan

The Sturm Cigarette Company (Sturm Zigaretten, Storm Cigarettes or Military Assault Cigarettes) was a cigarette company created by the Nazi Party's Sturmabteilung (SA). The sale of its cigarettes provided the SA with operating funds and a channel for political messaging. Coercion and violence were used to increase sales.

== Founding ==
During the 1920s, many cigarette firms in Germany closed, and the market was increasingly dominated by a few large and highly automated manufacturers. By 1933, the Nazi party was attacking the tobacco industry for having foreign and Jewish connections.

In 1929, Arthur Dressler cut a deal with the SA: together, they would found a cigarette manufacturer, and SA members would smoke its cigarettes, with the SA getting a royalty of 15–20 pfennig for every thousand cigarettes sold (Note: "Buchkritik: Der Sammelband "Braune Karrieren: Dresdner Täter und Akteure im Nationalsozialismus""., citing) (0.45–0.6% of sales price, given most cigarettes sold at 3 1/3 pfennig). At the time, the SA charged no membership fees and was thus financially dependent on donations from the Nazi party leadership; an independent income source was welcomed.

Approached through Saxon Nazi party leader Manfred von Killinger, SA-Stabschef Otto Wagener was interested and willing to put money towards an SA cigarette factory. The Nazi party offered 30,000 reichsmarks in start-up money and, as this was nowhere near enough, Nazi party supporter Jacques Bettenhausen invested another 500,000 reichsmarks. The Zigarettenfirma Sturm was founded, and registered as the Cigarettenfabrik Dressler.

== Marketing ==
A blackletter advertisement from October 1932 showing an aircraft with SA-logo roundels and the word Sturm ("Storm" or "Military Assault"). The strapline reads "Valuable coupons · Sumptuous pictures of uniforms".

The factory mainly produced four brands: Trommler (Drummer), Alarm, Sturm (Storm) and Neue Front (New Front). "Neue Front" was the most expensive brand, at six pfennig; "Sturm" cost five, and "Alarm" four. "Trommler" was the cheapest at 3 1/3 pfennig and, given the economic crisis, by far the most popular. In 1932, 80% of cigarettes sold were "Trommler", rising to 95% by 1933.

In early advertisements, all four main brands were listed; Nazi party imagery and the political slogan "Gegen Trust und Konzern" ("Against the [corporate] trust and the combine") were used. Later marketing focused on the "Trommler" brand. Apart from print advertising, the company owned a sound truck and hired advertising planes. Cigarette marketing reflected the political and economic situation. For instance, in 1930–1932, during the economic crash, advertisements showing catastrophic situations were common.

Sturm marketing was also used to make the prospect of serving in the German army more appealing. Cigarettes were sold with collectable sets of images of historical German military uniforms. While the SA was officially the sports and gymnastics division of the Nazi party, it was a successor to the banned Freikorps militias, and promoted itself as a military training program.

Adolf Hitler's opposition to smoking had limited effects on consumption and sales. While he ordered many localized smoking bans, they were widely ignored. The finance ministry appreciated the taxes tobacco brought in: by 1941, about a twelfth of state revenues. Aside from taxes, advertising revenues, and Sturm royalties and dividends, Nazi organizations accepted millions of reichsmarks in donations and bribes from the cigarette industry. The propaganda minister's view was decisive; Joseph Goebbels felt that cigarettes were essential to the war effort. Cigarettes were distributed free to soldiers, including minors, as part of their pay.

Between 1930 and 1940, the per-capita cigarette consumption of Germany rose from 500 to 1000 cigarettes a year; tens of billions of cigarettes were sold annually.

=== Coercion ===
There is evidence that coercion was used to promote the sale of these cigarettes. SA members were not just expected to smoke Sturm Cigarette Company cigarettes exclusively, they were compelled to: there were bag searches, and fines if any other brand were found. The SA agitated against and punished the use of other brands, especially the market leader Reemtsma. SA men attacked shops that sold rival brands, smashing windows and physically attacking the shopworkers.

== Profits ==
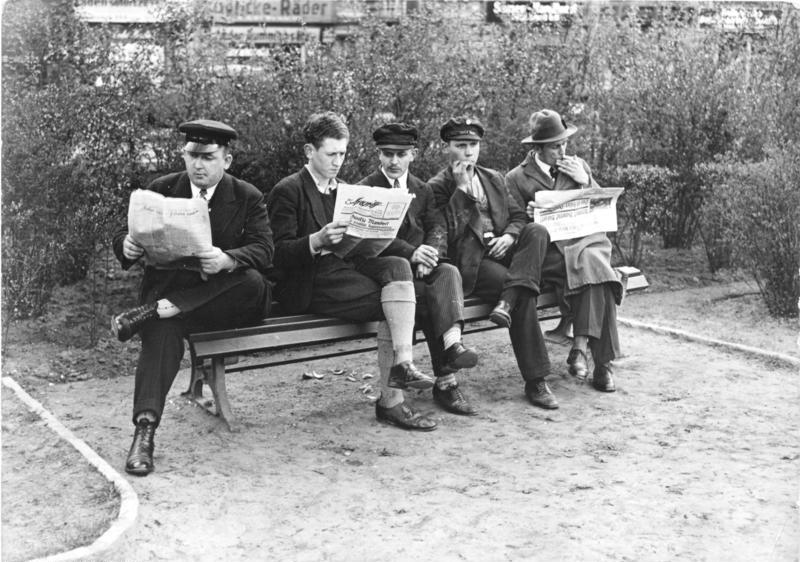
Unemployed SA men, at least three of them smoking, in 1932, three years after the SA began manufacturing cigarettes

German unemployment, 1928–1935

Through this scheme, a typical SA unit earned hundreds of reichsmarks each month. A hundred marks would be the SA earnings from the sale of 500,000 cigarettes, at 20 pfennig per thousand. A typical German smoker smoked around 15 cigarettes a day (similar to modern rates), so each SA unit continually received the income from just over a thousand smokers.

At the time, an average-intensity "Trommler" smoker paid the average wage would spend around a tenth of his gross income on cigarettes. Many did not have a regular wage: this was the time of the Great Depression, and unemployment peaked at over 30% (see graph). The SA recruited particularly among the unemployed and underemployed.

The firm first paid dividends to the SA in 1930. By 1932, it had a turnover of 36 million reichsmarks (equivalent to €148 million in 2021), and the SA made considerable profits; 1933 saw even higher returns. Money went to buy new buildings, factories, and advertising.

An advertisement from December 1933, after the Nazis took power, with the slogan Wer sie einmal wählt, ist ihr immer verbunden (Choose [vote for] them once, be bound to them forever)

== Replacement ==
In June 1932, Philipp Fürchtegott Reemtsma, head of the Reemtsma cigarette company, met with Adolf Hitler, Rudolf Hess, and Max Amann (Hitler's secretary, and the head of Eher Verlag, the Nazi party's printing house). Reemtsma's advertisements had been banned from Nazi party publications, but the publications lost money, and the party needed money for election campaigning. Hitler scolded Reemtsma for having Jewish partners, but they agreed to an initial deal of half a million marks of advertising.

Shortly after the Nazis took power in 1933, Philipp Reemtsma asked Hermann Göring, then the highest official in Prussia, to do something about charges of corruption and SA attacks against the company. In early 1934, Göring called off the court case in exchange for three million marks; Reemtsma subsequently paid him a million more per year, as well as making substantial donations to the party. By July 1934, the Night of the Long Knives had removed the threat of the SA: its leaders, who had profited from the firm's royalties, and often owned shares in it, were dead or imprisoned.

Reemtsma's Jewish partners had now emigrated, along with many Jewish employees, with help from Reemtsma. After Reemtsma made inquiries, the new SA leader, SA-Stabschef Viktor Lutze, cancelled their contract with Sturm Cigarettes and made a deal with Reemtsma in exchange for a fixed sum (in 1934, 250,000 reichsmarks), paid annually. Reemtsma would now produce the SA's cigarettes, and Sturm, left with unsellable cigarettes, filed for bankruptcy in 1935.

== See also ==
- Reemtsma (Sturm's successor as the SA cigarette company)
- Health effects of tobacco
- Nicotine marketing, History of nicotine marketing
- Anti-tobacco movement in Nazi Germany
