= Epigenetic effects of smoking =

Overview article

Epigenetic effects of smoking concerns how epigenetics (heritable characteristics that do not involve changes in DNA sequence) contributes to the deleterious effects of smoking. Cigarette smoking has been found to affect global epigenetic regulation of transcription across tissue types. Studies have shown differences in epigenetic markers such as DNA methylation, histone modifications and miRNA expression between smokers and non-smokers. Similar differences exist in children whose mothers smoked during pregnancy. These epigenetic effects are thought to be linked to many of negative health effects associated with smoking.

== Health impact ==
It has been well established that smoking cigarettes has a number of negative health effects, including increased risk for cancer, cardiovascular disease, and chronic obstructive pulmonary disease (COPD). Children exposed prenatally to cigarette smoke demonstrate increased risk for fetal growth restriction, sudden infant death syndrome, and addictive behaviors later in life, as well as a host of other secondary health effects. It is thought that epigenetic changes that arise from smoking cigarettes or exposure to cigarette smoke play a role in the development of these conditions.

Epigenetic modifications to the genome, including histone modifications, DNA methylation, and the modulation of RNAi, are major epigenetic events used to modulate gene expression. When the epigenome of an organism is altered by an environmental cue like smoking, gene expression changes accordingly. Changes in the regulation of critical genes can have disastrous consequences on health and quality of life. Irregular gene expression is one of the hallmarks of cancer, but is also found in a number of diseases and disorders.

== Mechanisms for changes in DNA methylation ==
One of the most prominent and well studied epigenetic consequences of cigarette smoke is altered DNA methylation. Cigarette smoke acts through a number of mechanisms to effect this, chief among these being smoke-induced damage to the DNA and altered expression levels of proteins involved in DNA methylation and transcriptional regulation.

=== Damage to DNA ===
Chemicals in smoke can damage DNA, which subsequently leads to changes in DNA methylation during the repair process. Damage typically comes in the form of double-strand breaks that are linked to carcinogens like arsenic, chromium, formaldehyde, polycyclic aromatic hydrocarbons, and nitrosamines which are found in cigarette smoke. DNMT1 is the enzyme involved in the maintenance of DNA methylation marks. DNMT1 is recruited to DNA during its replication, or during DNA repair. As a new DNA strand is synthesized, unmethylated cytosines are incorporated into the sequence. This leads to hemimethylated DNA, where an older methylated strand is bound to a younger unmethylated one.

DNMT1 is an enzyme which recognizes and corrects hemimethylation by transferring the appropriate methyl groups to the newly synthesized strand. Like all biological processes, DNMT1 based hemimethylation correction is not perfect. Mistakes in hemimethylation correction can occur, and are more likely to appear the more a DNA sequence is replicated or repaired. This is compounded by the fact that cigarette smoke compromises the expression and activity of DNMT1. The end result is a decrease in the body's ability to maintain proper methylation patterns, leading to misimpression of gene.

=== Effects on DNA methylating proteins ===
Exposure to cigarette smoke impacts proteins involved in DNA methylation. These effects come from either hypoxia induced by the cigarette smoke, or the chemical consequences of nicotine. Inhaling cigarette smoke increases blood levels of carbon monoxide which negatively affects oxygenation throughout the body leading to hypoxia. One response to hypoxia is the upregulation in synthesis of the major methyl donor S-adenosylmethionine. Upregulation of this methyl donor through heightened expression of methionine adenosyltransferase 2A leads to increased DNA methylation, which can lead to the down-regulation of target genes.

Nicotine found in cigarette smoke binds to nicotinic acetylcholine receptors. This binding leads to an increase in calcium levels which in turn can activate the cAMP response element-binding protein (CREB) transcription factor. The most striking downstream effect of the upregulation of this transcription factor is the downregulation of the DNMT1 gene, which has a cAMP response element in its promoter. This down-regulation of DNMT1 can have serious consequences on DNA methylation, namely a failure to maintain normal methylation patterns during DNA replication and repair. The upregulation of DNMT3b has also been shown to occur as a result of cigarette exposure.

DNMT3b is thought to be critical to de novo methylation, or the production of new methylation marks on DNA. This increased expression of DNMT3b and methionine adenosyltransferase 2A, taken together with the down-regulation of DNMT1, results in myriad unintended epigenetic consequences.

=== Effects on transcription factors ===
Sp1, a transcription factor that plays a crucial role in early development, was shown to be expressed at higher rates in lung epithelial cells in the presence of cigarette-smoke condensate. This is relevant because Sp1 binds to GC-rich promoter regions which prevent the methylation of these regions during embryonic development. Increased Sp1 expression can lead to a global reduction in DNA methylation, leading to a number of downstream health effects in developing embryos exposed to maternal cigarette smoke.

== Consequences of altered DNA methylation ==
Regardless of mechanism, several known differences in DNA methylation have been observed between smokers and non-smokers. An overall average decrease in DNA methylation is observed, leading to an increase in the expression of a number of genes. Several genes known to be affected by differential methylation are the CYP1A1 xenobiotic response element, AHRR, and F2RL3. CYP1A1 is critical to the detoxification of carcinogens, and is found to be hypomethylated in frequent smokers. AHRR and F2RL3 are similarly hypomethylated in smokers.

AHRR is known to inhibit the aryl hydrocarbon receptor, which is important to metabolizing harmful chemicals. The resultant increase in AHRR expression could lead to a decrease in the body's ability to break down carcinogens, increasing the risk of cancer. F2RL3 is known to be involved in blood clotting and the inflammation response. Effects on the regulation of F2RL3 in particular could be a link between epigenetic changes from smoking and increased risk of heart disease. Time specific changes in methylation of D4Z4 and NBL2 repeats, which are known factors in carcinogenesis, have also been observed.

Though smoking leads to an overall decrease in DNA methylation, several critical genes become hypermethylated. Two of the most noteworthy of these genes are p16 and p53. These genes are critical to cell cycle regulation and were shown to have higher levels of methylation in smokers than in non smokers. The subsequent loss of function of these genes could potentially lead to dysregulation of the cell cycle, wherein cells are able to bypass normal growth impeding signals. Ultimately, uncontrolled cellular divisions and failure to properly regulate the cell cycle leads to cancer.

Fetuses exposed in utero to cigarette smoke are also known to have some distinct epigenetic differences from smoke-free cohorts. CYP1A1 was found to be hypomethylated in the placentas of fetuses prenatally exposed to cigarette smoke, along with the transposable element AluYB8. Methylation of transposable elements is one of the primary ways they are prevented from replicating or moving within the genome. Similarly observed hypomethylation in a number of Alu elements results in a general decrease in genomic stability and an increase in the risk of cancer from mutation resulting from the random insertion of transposable elements.

Strikingly, BDNF appears to be hypermethylated in children who were exposed to smoke prenatally. BDNF is critical to long term memory formation and the upkeep of neurons. Downregulation of BDNF has also been linked to clinical depression. Taken as a whole, the epigentic consequences of prenatal exposure to cigarette smoke result in increased metabolic stress, decreased genomic stability, heightened risk of mutation and altered brain development.

== Effects on histone modifications ==
Histone modifications are another epigenetic phenomenon known to be affected by smoking. Cigarette smoke has been observed to globally alter histone modifications near the promoter regions of pro-inflammatory genes, mainly through an overall increase in acetylation. Cigarette smoke can alter histone acetylation through a number of pathways. Chief among these is the degradation of HDAC2, thereby preventing the removal of acetylation marks in affected cells. The degradation of this enzyme results from phosphorylation and subsequent ubiquitination induced by cigarette smoke.

In rat and mouse models, cigarette smoke was observed to increase acetylation of lysine 9 on histone H3 (H3K9), lysine 12 on histone H4 (H4K12) and phosphorylation of serine 10 on histone H3 (H3S10). These marks are associated with an increase in gene expression and prevent the accumulation of repressive histone modifications. Mechanistically, the increased frequency of these marks, especially the modifications on histone H3, are linked to the activation of IKK-α which directly phosphorylates histone H3 as a consequence of exposure to cigarette smoke. It is thought that this increase in acetylation of histones H3 and H4 in macrophages in the alveolus could potentially lead to the development of COPD.

== Effects on miRNA ==
MicroRNAs, or miRNAs, are known to be major epigenetic regulators of gene expression in humans. These RNAs are short molecules which bind to mRNA through complementary base pairing. This binding impacts the expression of proteins encoded by those mRNAs by either inducing the cleavage of the mRNA, destabilizing the molecule, or limiting the efficiency of its translation. Unlike differences in DNA methylation, changes in miRNA activity induced by cigarette smoke are largely unknown. Primary research data suggests that cigarette smoke promotes the dysregulation of a number of miRNA's. One such study showed that cigarette smoke downregulates miR-16, miR-21, and miR-146a in the placenta.

A downregulation of miR-16 is predicted to inhibit apoptosis via the subsequent upregulation of BCL2L2 and EDA, both of which contribute to anti-apoptotic signaling. Downregulaton of miR-146a is predicted to influence the expression of TRAF6, which has a number of downstream effects, including regulation of inflammatory responses and anti-apoptotic signaling. Taken as a whole, dysregulation of these miRNA's could lead to dysregulation of normal cell death, cell cycling and immune responses, all of which have negative health impacts and could potentially lead to cancerous growths and improper placental formation.

== See also ==
- Health effects of tobacco
