= Karl Astel =

German scientist and Nazi eugenicist (1898–1945)

- Born: 26 February 1898; Schweinfurt, Kingdom of Bavaria, German Empire
- Died: 4 April 1945 (aged 47); Jena, Nazi Germany
- Cause of death: Suicide by gunshot
- Education: University of Würzburg
- Known for: Rector of the University of Jena; Nazi eugenics
- Scientific career
- Fields: Sports medicine, Racial science

Karl Astel (26 February 1898 – 4 April 1945) was a German physician and Nazi Party member who became the rector of the University of Jena, and a racial scientist involved in the Nazi eugenics program.

== Early life ==
Astel was born on 26 February 1898 in Schweinfurt, the son of the municipal police chief. During the First World War, he served in the Royal Bavarian Army from 1916 to 1918. He came into contact with the National Socialist movement at an early age, while studying medicine in Würzburg. He became a member of the Freikorps Epp in 1919, and he participated in operations that repressed the Munich Soviet Republic. In 1920, he joined the Bund Oberland and took part in the Kapp Putsch, which tried to overthrow the recently established Weimar Republic. Astel also was a member of the Deutschvölkischer Schutz- und Trutzbund, the largest German antisemitic organization at the time, and the Militant League for German Culture. A committed Nazi, in his youth he was frequently involved in street fighting and, in November 1923, he was a participant in Adolf Hitler's failed Beer Hall Putsch. After completing his medical studies in 1930, Astel worked as a sports medicine physician at the Technical University of Munich. On 1 July 1930, he joined the Nazi Party (membership number 264,619) and, in 1934, he became a member of the Schutzstaffel (SS number 132,245).

== Career in Nazi Germany ==
Astel took over the management of the Hereditary Health Advisory Center at the SS Race and Settlement Main Office (RuSHA) and he also headed the Racial Hygiene Office of the SA Reich Leadership School in Munich. In July 1933, he became president of the State Office for Race Issues at Weimar in Thuringia and was responsible for thousands of forced sterilizations between 1933 and 1945. He also served as a judge at the Hereditary Health Court in Jena. Astel was appointed as a full professor at the faculty of medicine of the University of Jena in June 1934, by his Freikorps comrade Fritz Sauckel, now the Reichsstatthalter (Reich Governor) of Thuringia, to whom he already owed his appointment as head of the racial affairs office. There, Astel was given his own institute, initially known as the Institute for Human Breeding and Heredity Research and, from 1935, the Institute for Human Heredity Research and Racial Policy. In 1936, he was also made the head of the health and welfare system in the Thuringian Interior Ministry.

From 1939 to 1945, Astel was the rector at the University of Jena. In 1940, he was appointed as a Staatsrat (state councilor) in the Thuringian state government. From 1942, he also served as the leader of the Gaudozentenbund (regional association of university lecturers) in Thuringia. Also in 1942, he received a professorship and the directorship of the Institute for Genetic Race Hygiene at the Charles University in Prague. He also became the chief of the RuSHA Race Office in Prague. In April 1942, Astel was promoted to SS-Standartenführer. With the support of the SS, Astel developed the University of Jena into an influential Nazi racial and biological research center. He also was the co-editor of the journal Volk und Rasse (Nation and Race), an illustrated monthly publication for racial studies and racial hygiene, published by the Julius Friedrich Lehmann publishing house in Munich. Astel said of the Nazi concentration camp system: "Tens of thousands of the worst offenders are rendered harmless in this way, and to a considerable extent, even put to good use."

Astel was also involved in the anti-tobacco movement. After he became rector at Jena in 1939, he tried to form the ideal SS university (SS-Muster-Universität). Astel and like-minded comrades such as Heinz Brücher, Gerhard Heberer, Victor Julius Franz, Johann von Leers and Lothar Stengel-von Rutkowski considered Ernst Haeckel as their forerunner.

Toward the end of the Second World War, Astel took his own life on 4 April 1945.

== Timeline ==
- 1920s: Freikorps member
- 1923: Beer Hall Putsch participant
- 1930: Joined the Nazi Party
- 1930s:
  - German Society for Racial Hygiene
  - Sturmabteilung (SA) Reich Leadership School
  - Race and Settlement Main Office of the SS (RuSHA)
  - Compiled a databank on people to help with 'excluding'
- 1933: President, Thuringia State Office for Race Issues, Weimar
- 1934: Professor and Director, University Institute for Human Breeding Theory and Heredity Research, Jena
- 1936: Director of Health and Welfare Issues, Thuringia
- 1934–1937: Judge at the Hereditary Health Court
- 1939: Rector, University of Jena
- 1942: Professor and Director, Institute for Genetic Race Hygiene, Charles University, Prague; chief, Prague RuSHA
- 1945: Suicide in Jena

== See also ==
- Nazi Eugenics
- Anti-tobacco movement in Nazi Germany

== Sources ==
- Klee, Ernst (2007). Das Personenlexikon zum Dritten Reich. Wer war was vor und nach 1945. Frankfurt-am-Main: Fischer-Taschenbuch-Verlag. ISBN 978-3-596-16048-8.
- Stockhorst, Erich (1985). 5000 Köpfe: Wer War Was im 3. Reich. Arndt. ISBN 978-3-887-41116-9.
