= Aryl hydrocarbon receptor repressor =

Protein found in humans

AHRR

Identifiers
- Aliases: AHRR, AHH, AHHR, bHLHe77, aryl-hydrocarbon receptor repressor, aryl hydrocarbon receptor repressor
- External IDs: OMIM: 606517; MGI: 1333776; GeneCards: AHRR

Gene location (Human)
| Chr. | Chromosome 5 (human) |
| Band | 5p15.33 | Start | 321,714 bp |
| Band | 5p15.33 | End | 438,291 bp |

Gene location (Mouse)
| Chr. | Chromosome 13 (mouse) |
| Band | 13|13 C1 | Start | 74,359,237 bp |
| Band | 13|13 C1 | End | 74,440,450 bp |
RNA expression pattern
| Bgee | Human / Mouse (ortholog); Top expressed in: left testis; stromal cell of endometrium; right testis; testicle; spleen; epithelium of colon; gonad; skin of leg; mucosa of transverse colon; superior frontal gyrus / Top expressed in: female urethra; neural layer of retina; ventricular zone; embryo; endothelial cell of lymphatic vessel; retinal pigment epithelium; conjunctival fornix; blastocyst; jejunum; esophagus; More reference expression data |
| BioGPS | n/a |
Gene ontology
| Molecular function | DNA binding; protein dimerization activity; DNA-binding transcription factor activity, RNA polymerase II-specific; protein binding |
| Cellular component | cytoplasm; nuclear aryl hydrocarbon receptor complex; nucleus; nucleoplasm; cytosol |
| Biological process | regulation of transcription, DNA-templated; response to drug; transcription, DNA-templated; positive regulation of transcription by RNA polymerase II; negative regulation of transcription by RNA polymerase II; xenobiotic metabolic process; regulation of transcription by RNA polymerase II |
Sources:Amigo / QuickGO
Orthologs
| Databases | NCBI: entry; OMA: entry |
| Species | Human | Mouse |
| Entrez | 57491 | 11624 |
| Ensembl | ENSG00000063438 | ENSMUSG00000021575 |
| UniProt | A9YTQ3; E5RGQ2 | Q3U1U7 |
| RefSeq (mRNA) | NM_020731; NM_001242412; NM_001377236; NM_001377239 | NM_009644; NM_001317351 |
| RefSeq (protein) | NP_065782; NP_001364165; NP_001364168 | NP_001304280; NP_033774 |
| Location (UCSC) | Chr 5: 0.32 – 0.44 Mb | Chr 13: 74.36 – 74.44 Mb |
| PubMed search |
- Wikidata
| View/Edit Human | View/Edit Mouse |

Aryl-hydrocarbon receptor repressor is a protein that in humans is encoded by the gene AHRR.

== Function ==
Dioxins and dioxin-like compounds are teratogens that exert their effects through the aryl hydrocarbon receptor (AhR) in conjunction with the receptor's binding partner, aryl hydrocarbon receptor nuclear translocator (ARNT). The protein encoded by this gene represses signal transduction by the AhR by competing with the arylhydrocarbon receptor for binding to the ARNT. Expression of the repressor is stimulated by the receptor/translocator heterodimer, thereby regulating receptor function through a negative feedback mechanism. In addition, the encoded protein can bind to nuclear factor-kappa B.

The AhRR gene may act as a tumor suppressor.

== Tissue distribution ==
The expression of AhRR is high in testis, lung, ovary, spleen and pancreas in adults, whereas expression is low in all tissues in fetuses.
