= Fritz Lickint =

German tobacco researcher (1898–1960)

Fritz Balduin Lickint (1 October 1898 – 7 July 1960) was a German internist and social democrat, who investigated scientifically health problems and social problems related to alcohol and tobacco, described in the 1920s cancer of the lung from smoking, and the cancer pathway alongside the respiratory and upper digestive tract. In 1925 he published about an increase of gastric ulcer and stomach cancer in smokers.

All his life Lickint was an engaged social democrat and member of the union "social democratic physicians". Because of his political attitude he lost his job at the Chemnitz hospital in 1934, shortly after the Nazis came into power, and was conscripted to military service in 1939 as a basic aidman. Not before 1945 he was able to return to his work as a hospital physician and later became hospital director.

Lickint was one of the first physicians describing physical and psychological tobacco dependence as a disease which needs treatment, suggesting a number of therapies (some of them still in use). He also pointed to the "anti-social behavior of many smokers, polluting ambient air recklessly and harming the health of other people". Lickint created the term "passive smoking". The Nazis usurped these thoughts, but simultaneously supplied soldiers with cigarettes and cooperated with the German tobacco company Reemtsma, also in Austria.

Later the propaganda of the tobacco industry in Austria and Germany traced the origin of the non-smoking movement back to the Nazi time, when actually more cigarettes were smoked than ever before. In fact the movement against alcohol and nicotine had started in the social democratic party at the beginning of the 20th century, even though research and ideas of Fritz Lickint were also used in the anti-tobacco movement in Nazi Germany. Though he was not the first to publish statistical evidence suggesting a link between cancer and tobacco consumption, in 1929 Lickint published the most thorough case-series study at the time. In 1939, Lickint in collaboration with The Reich's Committee for the Struggle against Addictive Drugs and the German Antitobacco League published Tabak und Organismus, a 1200-page volume covering 8000 publications which is considered to be the largest scholarly compilation on the ills of tobacco at the time. This in turn earned him the title as the physician "most hated by the tobacco industry." Lickint argued that tobacco was highly addictive and that its usage was responsible for thousands of cancers in Nazi Germany.

Like other doctors at the time, Lickint also experimented with radical approaches to cure cancer such as x-raying the spleens of cancer patients in hopes of producing cancer-fighting hormones. He also coined the term "passive smoking".

In 1999, a research Institut für Nikotinforschung und Raucherentwöhnung ("Institute for nicotine research and smoking cessation") was founded; previously, there had been no German center for such research since 1945. It was later named the Fritz-Lickint-Institut für Nikotinforschung und Raucherentwöhnung.
