= Nicotine marketing =

Marketing technique

Bans on tobacco direct advertising in WHO's member countries in 2022

Nicotine marketing is the marketing of nicotine-containing products or use. Traditionally, the tobacco industry markets cigarette smoking, but it is increasingly marketing other products, such as electronic cigarettes and heated tobacco products. Products are marketed through social media, stealth marketing, mass media, and sponsorship (particularly of sporting events). Expenditures on nicotine marketing are in the tens of billions a year; in the US alone, spending was over US$1 million per hour in 2016; in 2003, per-capita marketing spending was $290 per adult smoker, or $45 per inhabitant. Nicotine marketing is increasingly regulated; some forms of nicotine advertising are banned in many countries. The World Health Organization (WHO) recommends a complete tobacco advertising ban.

== Effects ==
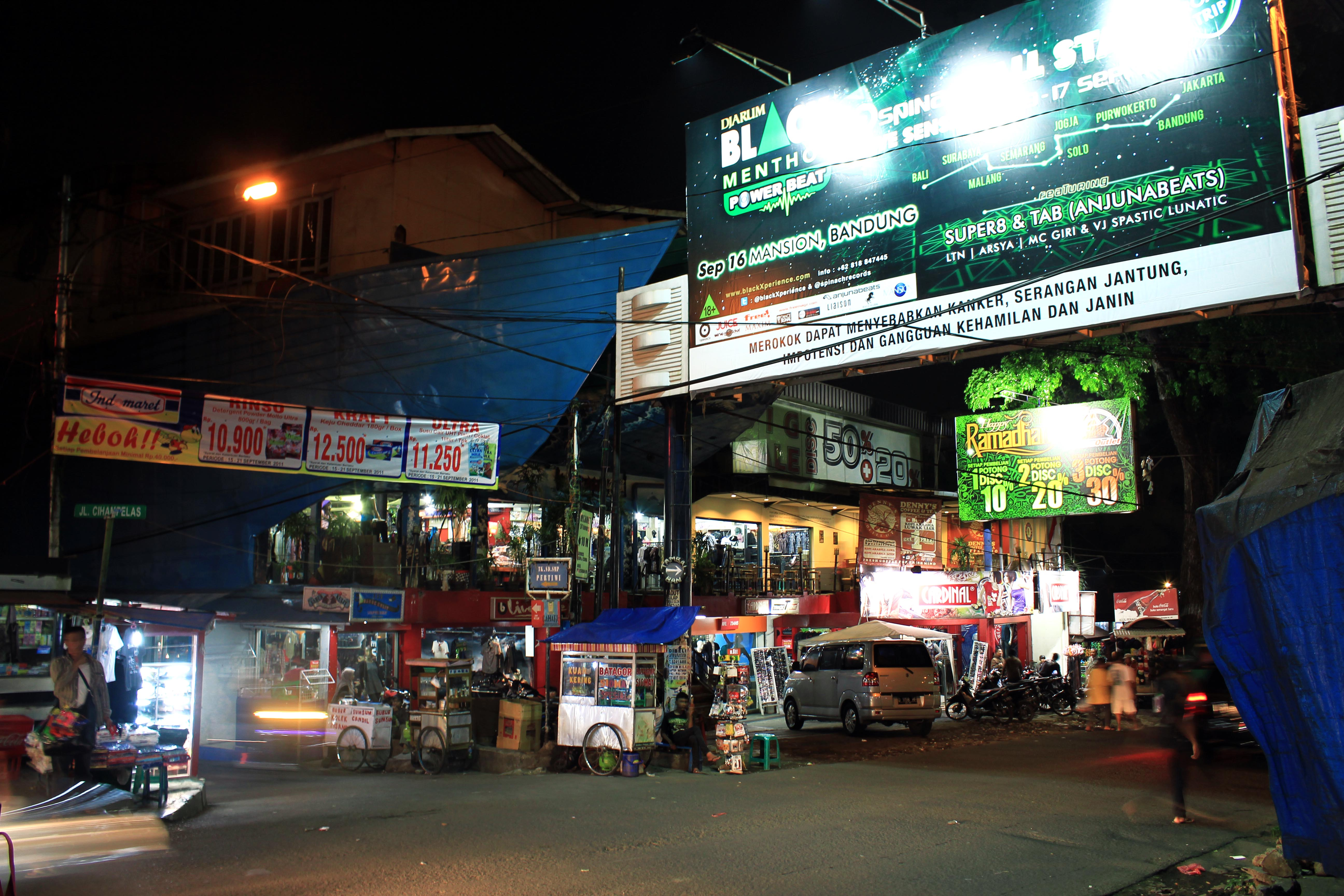
In Indonesia, cigarette advertisements are still allowed.

The effectiveness of tobacco marketing in increasing consumption of tobacco products is widely documented. Advertisements cause new people to become addicted, mostly when they are minors. Ads also keep established smokers from quitting. Advertising peaks in January, when the most people are trying to quit, although most people take up smoking in the summer.

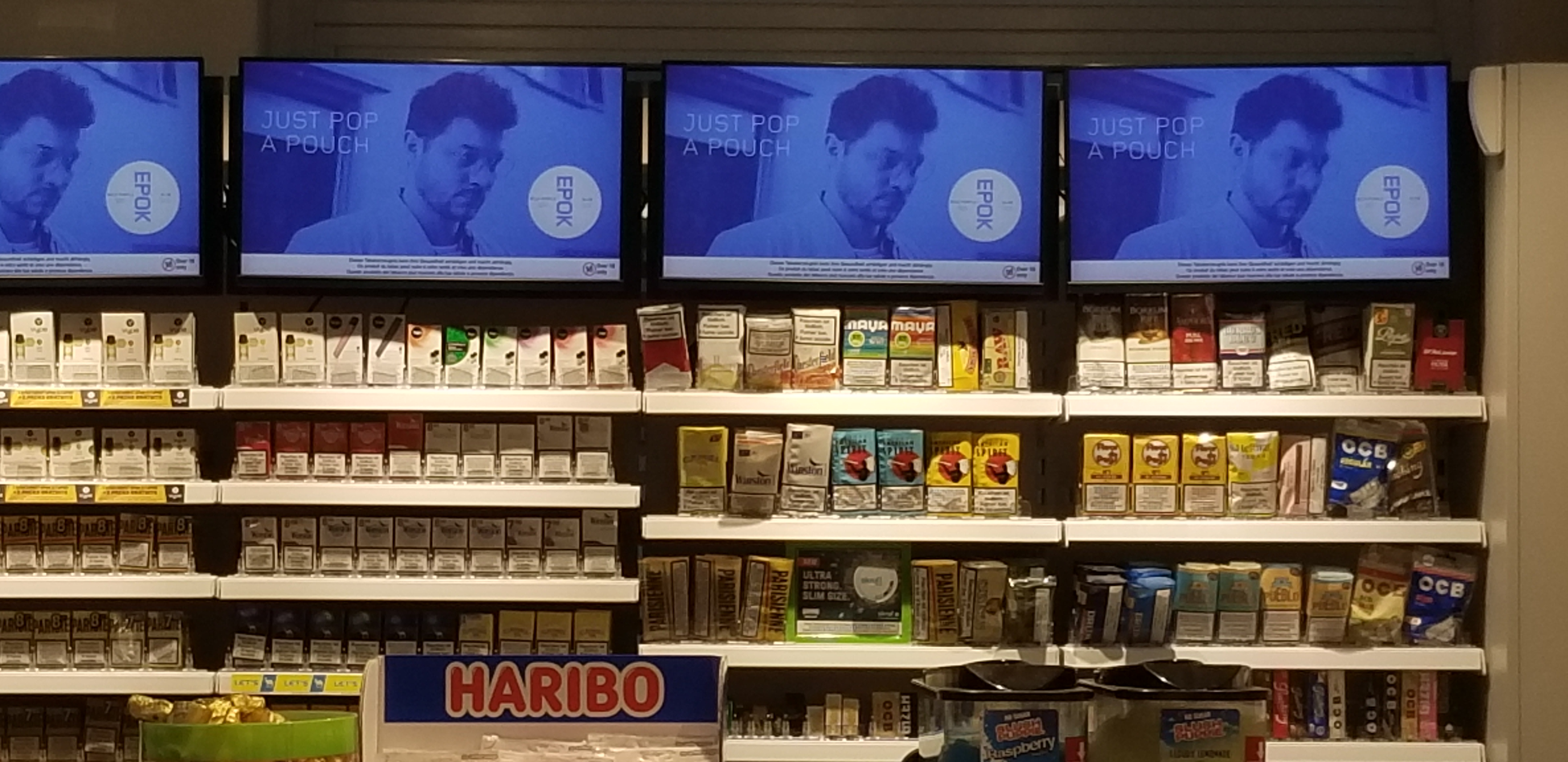
Tobacco shop in Neuchâtel, Switzerland in 2020: advertisement is authorized inside the shop.

The tobacco industry has frequently claimed that ads are only about "brand preference", encouraging existing smokers to switch to and stick to their brand. There is, however, substantial evidence that ads cause people to become, and stay, addicted.

Marketing is also used to oppose regulation of nicotine marketing and other tobacco control measures, both directly and indirectly. For example, by improving the image of the nicotine industry and reducing criticism from youth and community groups. Industry charity and sports sponsorships are publicized (with publicity costing up to ten times the cost of the publicized act), portraying the industry as actively sharing the values of the target audience. Marketing is also used to normalize the industry ("Just Another Fortune 500 Company", "More Than a Tobacco Company"). Finally, marketing is used to give the impression that nicotine companies are responsible, "Open and Honest". This is done through an emphasis on informed choice and "anti-teen-smoking" campaigns, although such ads have been criticized as counterproductive (causing more smoking) by independent groups.

Magazines, but not newspapers, that get revenue from nicotine advertising are less likely to run stories critical of nicotine products. Internal documents also show that the industry used its influence with the media to shape coverage of news, such as a decision not to mandate health warnings on cigarette packages or a debate over advertising restrictions.

Counter-marketing is also used, mostly by public health groups and governments. The addictiveness and health effects of tobacco use are generally described, as these are the themes missing from pro-tobacco marketing.

According to a 2019 study, television advertisement for tobacco "increased the share of smokers in the population by 5–15 percentage points, generating roughly 11 million additional smokers between 1946 and 1970."

=== Regulation and evasion techniques ===
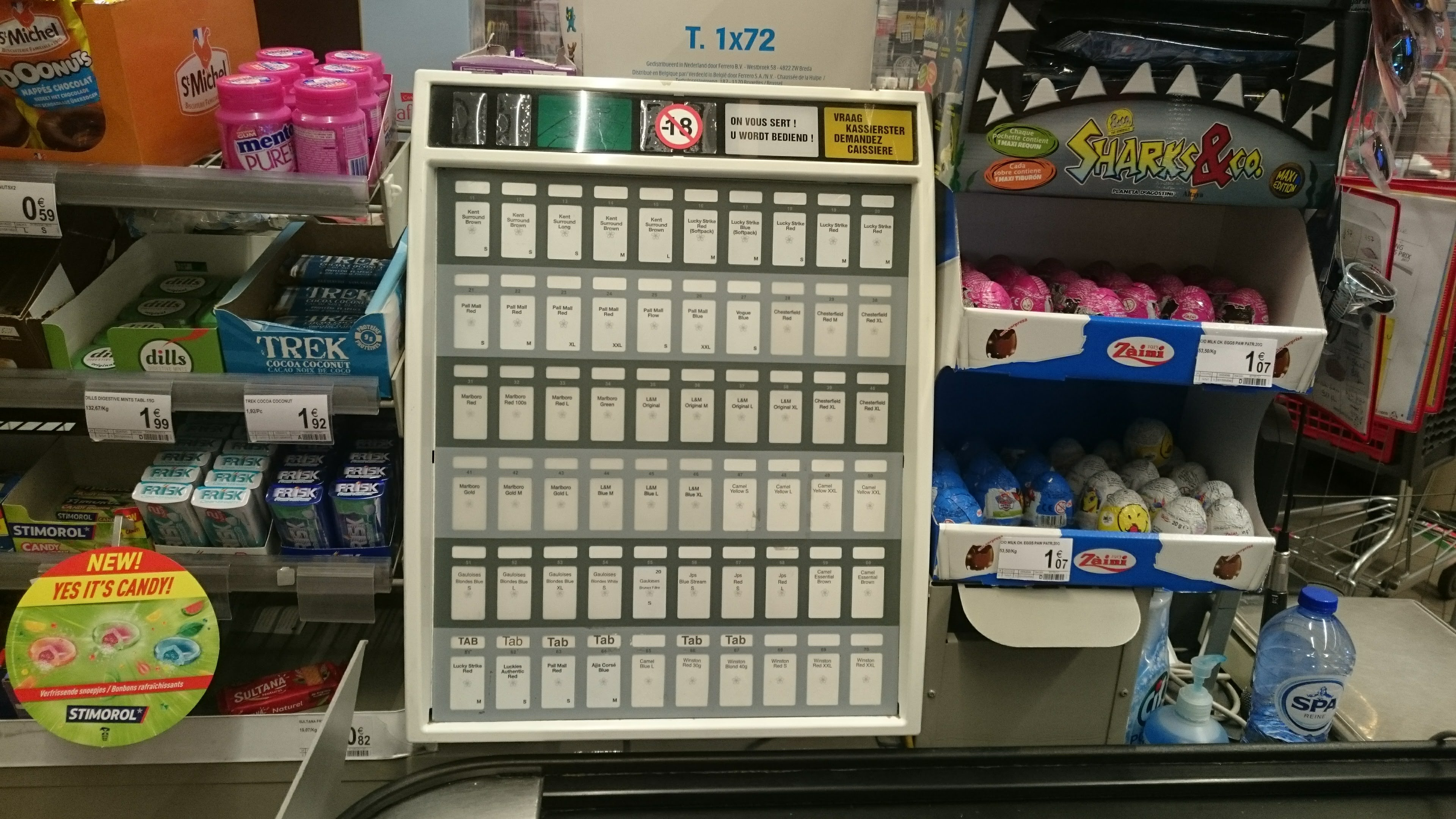
Tobacco distributor in Belgium after the introduction of plain packaging (April 2020)

Because it harms public health, nicotine marketing is increasingly regulated.

Advertising restrictions typically shift marketing spending to unrestricted media. Banned on television, ads move to print; banned in all conventional media, ads shift to sponsorships; banned as in-store advertising and packaging, advertising shifts to shill (undisclosed) marketing reps, sponsored online content, viral marketing, and other stealth marketing techniques. Unlike conventional advertising, stealth marketing is not openly attributed to the organization behind it. This neutralizes mistrust of tobacco companies, which is widespread among children and the teenagers who provide the industry with most new addicts.

Another method of evading restrictions is to sell less-regulated nicotine products instead of the ones for which advertising is more regulated. For instance, while TV ads of cigarettes are banned in the United States, similar TV ads of e-cigarettes are not.

The most effective media are usually banned first, meaning advertisers need to spend more money to addict the same number of people. Comprehensive bans can make it impossible to effectively substitute other forms of advertising, leading to actual falls in consumption. However, skillful use of allowed media can increase advertising exposure; the exposure of U.S. children to nicotine advertising is increasing as of 2018.

== Methods ==
One of the Find Your Voice ads used by Virginia Slims in 1999 that drew attention due to its rebellious advertising aimed at women. Its tagline reads "NEVER let the goody two shoes get you down".

Nicotine advertising uses specific techniques, but often uses multiple methods simultaneously. For instance, a 1999 advert for Virginia Slims uses many of the techniques discussed below. Its tagline read "NEVER let the goody two shoes get you down", making use of reactance; it had also been described as urging smokers to disregard health warnings. The model's gesture in the advert echoed earlier ads which made more explicit claims of voice box benefits. The 1999–2000 "Find your voice" ad campaign, of which this ad was a part, was criticized as offensive to smokers who have lost their voices to throat cancer, and as targeting minority women and seeking to associate itself with empowerment, independence, self-expression, women's rights, and sexual allure.

=== Rebellion ===
Nicotine marketing makes extensive use of reactance, the feeling that one is being unreasonably controlled. Reactance often motivates rebellion, in behavior or belief, which demonstrates that the control was ineffective, restoring the feeling of freedom.

Ads thus rarely explicitly tell the viewer to use nicotine; this has been shown to be counter-productive. Instead, they frequently suggest using nicotine as a way to rebel and be free. This marketing message is at odds with the feelings of smokers, who commonly feel trapped by their addiction and unable to quit. Mention of addiction is avoided in nicotine advertising.

Reactance can be eliminated by successfully concealing attempts to manipulate or control behavior. Unlike conventional advertising, stealth marketing is not openly attributed to the organization behind it. This neutralizes mistrust of tobacco companies, which is widespread among children and the teenagers who provide the industry with most new addicts. The internet and social media are particularly suited to stealth and viral marketing, which is also cheap; nicotine companies now spend tens of millions per year on online marketing.

Counter-advertising also shows awareness of reactance; it rarely tells the viewer what to do. More commonly, it cites statistics about addictiveness and other health effects. Some anti-smoking ads dramatise the statistics (e.g. by piling 1200 body bags in front of the New York headquarters of Philip Morris, now Altria, to illustrate the number of people dying daily from smoking); others document individual experiences. Providing information does not generally provoke reactance.

=== Social conformity ===
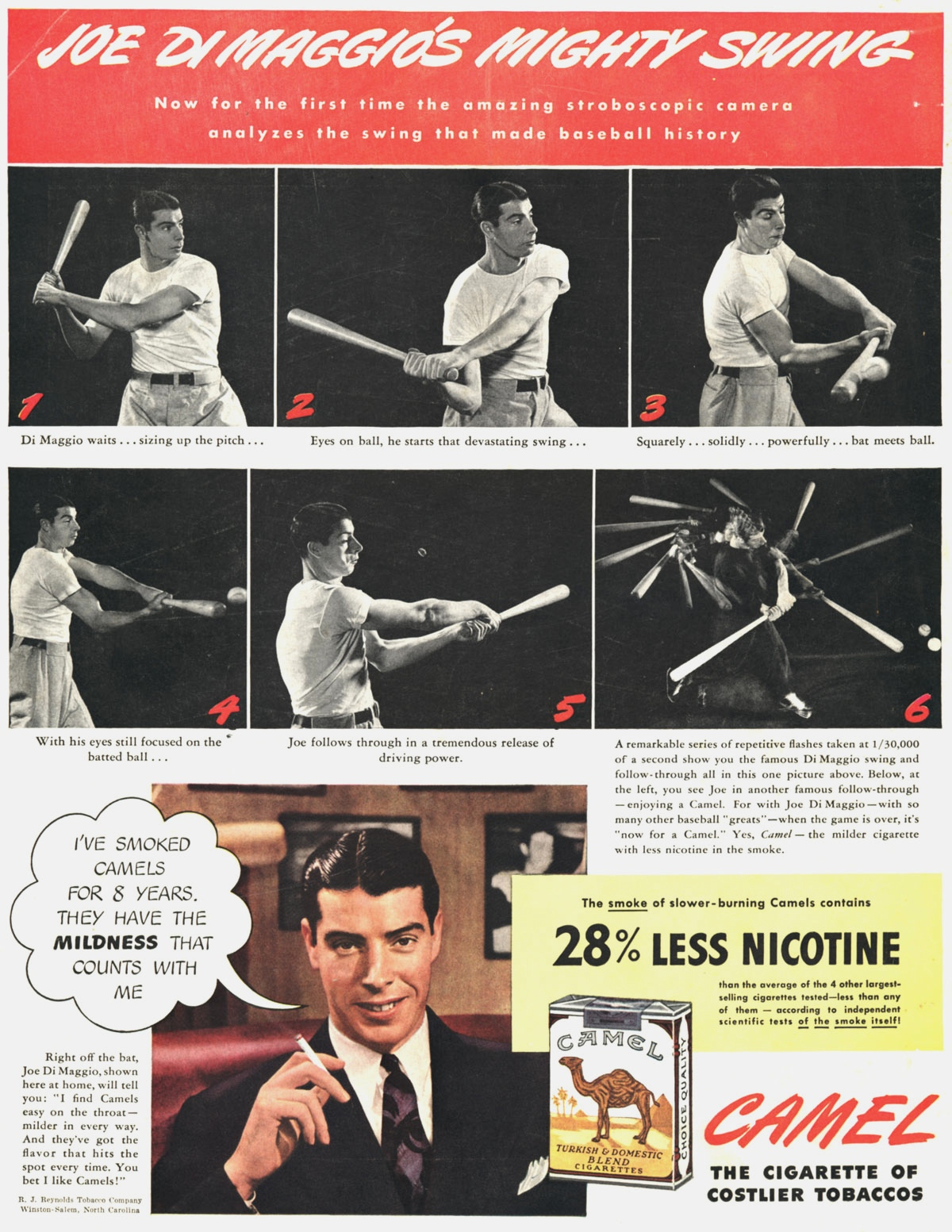
Advertisement featuring baseball player Joe DiMaggio in 1941

Despite products being marketed as individualistic and non-conformist, people generally actually start smoking due to peer pressure. Being offered a cigarette is one of the largest risk factors for smoking. Boys with a high degree of social conformity are also more likely to start smoking.

Social pressure is deliberately used in marketing, often using stealth marketing techniques to avoid triggering reactance. "Roachers", selected for good looks, style, charm, and being slightly older than the targets, are hired to offer samples of the product. "Hipsters" are also recruited clandestinely from the bar and nightclub scene to sell cigarettes, and ads are placed in alternative media publications with "hip credibility". Other strategies include sponsoring bands and seeking to give an impression of usage by scattering empty cigarette packages.

Ads also use the threat of social isolation, implied or explicit (e.g. "Nobody likes a quitter"). Great care is taken to maintain the impression that a brand is popular and growing in popularity, and that people who smoke the brand are popular.

Marketing seeks to create a desirable identity as a user, or a user of a specific brand. It seeks to associate nicotine use with rising social identities (see, for instance, the illustrating ad, and history of nicotine marketing in the woman's and civil rights movements, and its use of western affluence in the developing world, below). It seeks to associate nicotine use with positive traits, such as intelligence, fun, sexiness, sociability, high social status, wealth, health, athleticism, and pleasant outdoor pursuits. Many of these associations are fairly implausible; smoking is not generally considered an intelligent choice, even by smokers; most smokers feel miserable about smoking, smoking causes impotence, many smokers feel socially stigmatized for smoking, and smoking is expensive and unhealthy.

Marketing also uses associations with loyalty, which not only defend a brand, but put a positive spin on not quitting. A successful campaign playing on loyalty and identity was the "rather fight than switch" campaign, in which the makeup the models wore made it seem as if they had black eyes, by implication from a fight with smokers of other cigarettes (campaign by a subsidiary of American Tobacco Company, now owned by British American Tobacco).

=== Mood changes ===
Nicotine is also advertised as good for "nerves", irritability, and stress. Again, ads have moved from explicit claims ("Never gets on your nerves") to implicit claims ("Slow down. Pleasure up"). Although nicotine products temporarily relieve nicotine withdrawal symptoms, an addiction causes worse stress and mood, due to mild withdrawal symptoms between hits. Nicotine addicts need the nicotine to temporarily feel normal. Nicotine addiction seems to worsen mental health problems, but industry marketing has claimed that nicotine is both less harmful and therapeutic for people with mental illness, and is a form of "self-medication". Marketing has also claimed that quitting will worsen rather than improve mental health symptoms. These claims have been criticized by independent researchers as inaccurate.

It is thought that nicotine withdrawal is worse for those who are already stressed or depressed, making quitting more difficult. About 40% of the cigarettes sold in the U.S. are smoked by people with mental health issues. Smoking rates in the U.S. military were also high, and over a third started smoking after entering the military; deployment was also a risk factor. Disabled people are more likely to smoke; smoking causes disability, but the stress of disability might also cause smoking.

According to the CDC Tobacco Product Use Among Adults 2015 report, people who are American Indian/Alaska Native, non-Hispanic, less-educated (0–12 years education; no diploma, or General Educational Development), lower-income (annual household income less than $35,000), the uninsured, and those under serious psychological distress have the highest reported percentage of any tobacco product use.

Minorities

"Clearly, the sole reason for B&W's interest in the black and Hispanic communities is the actual and potential sales of B&W products within these communities and the profitability of those sales."

— Total minority marketing plan, by Brown & Williamson, a now-defunct subsidiary of British American Tobacco, 7 September 1984

Poorer people also smoke more. When marketing cigarettes to the developing world, tobacco companies associate their product with an affluent Western lifestyle. However, in the developed world, smoking has almost vanished among the affluent. Smoking rates among the American poor are much higher than among the rich, with rates of over 40% for those with the equivalent of a US high school diploma. These differences have been attributed to both lack of healthcare and to selective marketing to socio-economic, racial, and sexual minorities. The tobacco industry targeted young rural men by creating advertisements with images of cowboys, hunters, and race car drivers. Teens in rural areas are less likely to be exposed to anti-tobacco messages in the media. Low-income and predominantly minority neighborhoods often have more tobacco retailers and more tobacco advertising than other neighborhoods.

The tobacco industry focuses marketing towards vulnerable groups, contributing to the large disparity in smoking and health problems. The tobacco industry has marketed heavily to African Americans, sexual minorities, and even the homeless and the mentally ill. In 1995, Project SCUM, which targeted sexual and racial minorities and homeless people in San Francisco, was planned by R. J. Reynolds Tobacco Company (a British American Tobacco subsidiary).

Tobacco companies have often been progressive in their hiring policies, employing women and people of colour when this was controversial. They also donate some of their profits to a variety of organizations that help people in need.

=== Non-addictiveness and healthiness ===
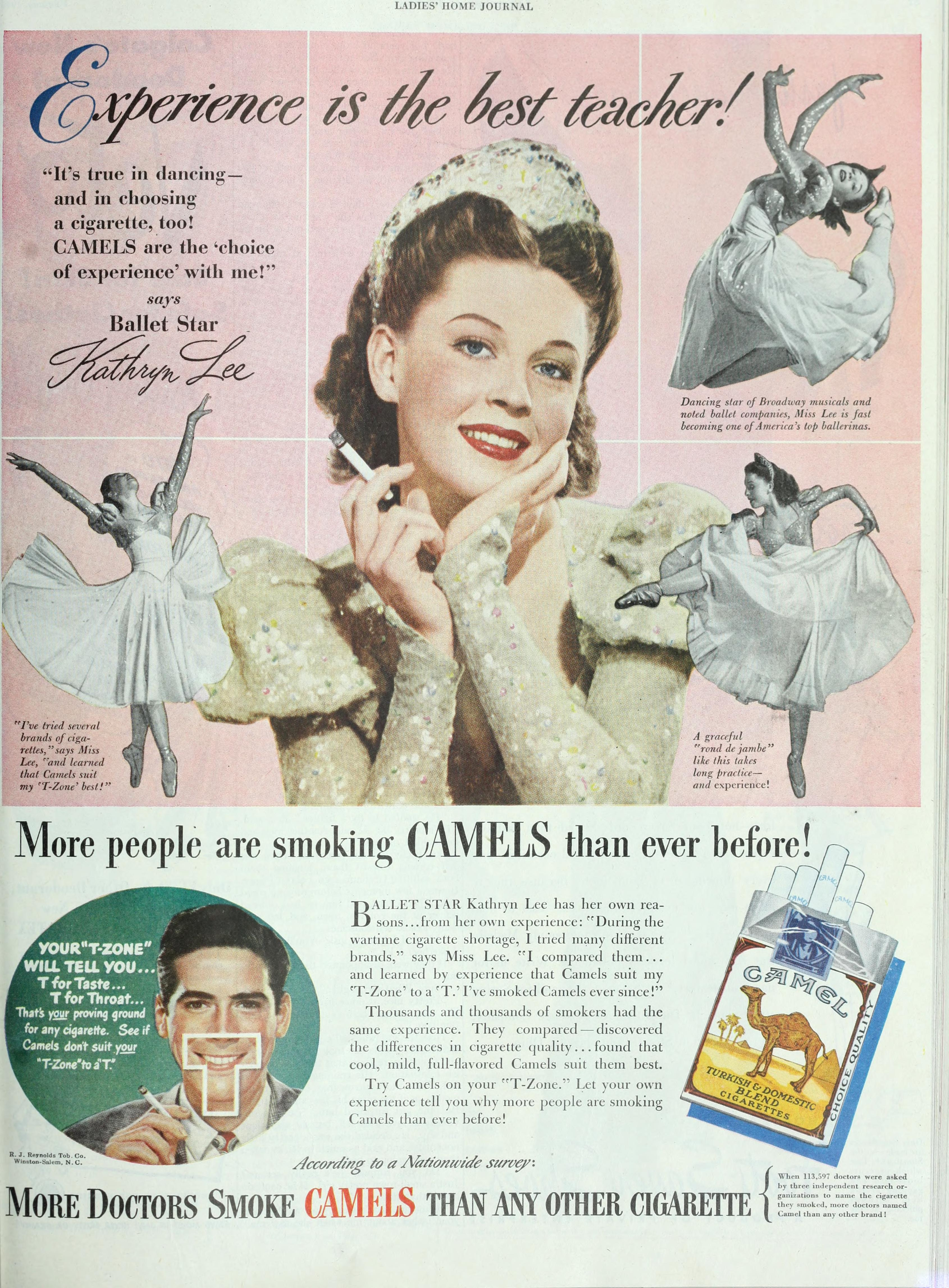
"More Doctors Smoke Camels than Any Other Cigarette" advertisement for Camel cigarettes in the 1940s

Reference to the addictiveness of nicotine is avoided in marketing. Indeed, the addictiveness of nicotine was explicitly denied into the nineties; in 1994, seven tobacco executives stated that nicotine was not addictive while on oath before the US Congress. Industry feared that, if continuing to smoke was not seen as a "free choice", they would be exposed to legal and social liabilities.

The nicotine industry frequently markets its products as healthy, safe, and harmless; it has even marketed them as beneficial to health. These marketing messages were initially explicit, but over the decades, they became more implicit and indirect. Explicitly claiming something that the consumer knows to be untrue tend to make them distrust and reject the message, so the effectiveness of explicit claims dropped as evidence of the harms of cigarettes became more widely known. Explicit claims also have the disadvantage that they remind smokers of the health harms of the product.

Implicit claims include slogans with connotations of health and vitality, such as "Alive with pleasure", and imagery (of instance, images of athletic, healthy people, the presence of healthy children, healthy natural environments, and medical settings).

==== "Modified risk" products ====
"Modified risk" nicotine products, alternate nicotine products that are implied to be less harmful, are an old strategy. These products are used to discourage quitting, by offering unwilling smokers an alternative to quitting, and implying that using the alternate product will reduce the hazards of smoking. "Modified risk" products also attract new smokers.

Many "modified risk" nicotine products are actually just as risky as the products they were marketed against. As the long-term harms of cigarette smoking emerge after ~20 years of use, claims of reduced long-term harms for a new product cannot immediately be refuted. Products may become popular on the basis of false health claims before the research is done that proves them false.

Explicit claims of health benefits carry legal risks. They may also require regulatory pre-approval. Reduced levels of specific harmful chemicals are often advertised; people tend to wrongly interpret these as claims of reduced harm. To imply that some nicotine products are healthier than others without making explicit claims, marketing has used descriptions like "light", "mild", "natural", "gentle", "calm", "soft", and "smooth".

Both adults and youth have been shown to misinterpret marketing claims about changes in risk. They falsely interpret them as meaning that the product is safe. They are more likely to start using it, and less likely to quit, as a result.

===== "Mild" and "roasted" cigarettes =====
In the 1920s to 1950s, ads often focused on throat irritation and coughs, claiming that specific brands were better. This also distracted from the more serious harms of smoking, which were being revealed by research at the time. Claims were made that toasting tobacco removed irritants (which were said to have been sold on to chemical companies).

===== Menthol cigarettes =====
Menthol cigarettes have also been marketed as healthier from the 1930s onwards. They were even inaccurately advertised as medicinal, a treatment for smokers that would soothe a throat irritated by smoking, or as a treatment for a cold. Where this is illegal, they are marketed as healthier by implication, using words like "mild", "natural", "gentle", "calm", "soft", "smooth", and imagery of healthy natural environments. There is no evidence that menthol cigarettes are healthier, but there is evidence that they are somewhat easier to become addicted to and harder to quit.

====== Reaching the Black market in the United States ======
Historian Keith Wailoo argues the cigarette industry targeted a new market in the black audience starting in the 1960s. It took advantage of several converging trends. First was the increased national attention on the dangers of lung cancer. Cigarette companies took the initiative in fighting back. They did this by developing menthol-flavored brands like Kool, which seemed to be more soothing to the throat, as well as advertised them as good for smokers' health. A second trend was the Federal ban on tobacco advertising on radio and television. There was no ban on advertising in the print media, so the industry responded by large scale advertising in black newspapers and magazines. They began erecting billboards in inner city neighborhoods. The third trend was the Civil rights movement of the 1960s. Big Tobacco responded by investing heavily in the Civil Rights Movement, winning the gratitude of many national and local leaders. Menthol-flavored cigarette brands systematically sponsored local events in the black community and subsidized major black organizations, especially the NAACP (National Association for the Advancement of Colored People). They also subsidized many churches and schools. The marketing initiative was a success as the rate of smoking in the black community grew, while it declined among whites. Furthermore, three of four black smokers purchased menthol cigarettes.

===== Filter cigarettes =====
In the 1950s, filters were added to cigarettes, and heavily marketed, until they faced regulatory action as false advertising. Initially, efforts were made to develop filters that actually reduced harms; as it became obvious that this was not economically possible, filters were instead designed to turn brown with use.

===== Ventilated ("light") cigarettes =====
Ventilated cigarettes (marketed as "light", "low-tar", "low-nicotine" etc.) do feel cooler, airier, and less harsh, and a smoking machine will give lower tar and nicotine readings for them. But they do not actually reduce human intake or health risks, as a human responds to the lower resistance to breathing through them by taking bigger puffs. They were also designed to be equally addictive, as manufacturers did not want to lose customers. They were introduced in the 1970s, responding to regulation requiring that nicotine and tar yields be included in cigarette ads. Light cigarettes became so popular that, as of 2004, half of American smokers preferred them over regular cigarettes. According to the US federal government's National Cancer Institute (NCI), light cigarettes provide no benefit to smokers' health. However, people using "light" cigarettes are less likely to quit.

===== Heated tobacco products =====
Heated tobacco products, presented as heat-not-burn products, are marketed as less harmful than regular cigarettes since 1988. There is no reliable evidence that these products are any less harmful than regular cigarettes. A reduced harm from using these products has not been proven. These products are marketed as a "smoke-free" alternative to regular cigarettes. These products do generate smoke. Companies are using similar strategies and channels as previously used for traditional cigarettes.

===== Electronic cigarettes =====
A 2014 review said, "the e-cigarette companies have been rapidly expanding using aggressive marketing messages similar to those used to promote cigarettes in the 1950s and 1960s." Unsupported claims on safety and quitting smoking are made. Common marketing messages on brand websites, claiming that e-cigarettes are safe and healthy, have been described as "concerning". It is commonly claimed that e-cigarettes emit merely "harmless water vapor", which is not the case. E-cigarette e-liquids marketed as "nicotine-free" have been found to contain nicotine.

== Targets ==
"[A]dvertising for low delivery or traditional brands should be constructed in ways so as not to provoke anxiety about health, but to alleviate it, and enable the smoker to feel assured about the habit and confident in maintaining it over time."

— British American Tobacco.

=== Unwilling smokers: customer retention ===
On average, smokers start as adolescents and make over 30 quit attempts, at a rate of about 1 per year, before breaking a nicotine addiction in their 40s or 50s. Most say they feel addicted, and feel misery and disgust at their inability to quit (in surveys, 71–91% regret having started, over 80% intend to quit, around 15% plan to quit within the next month). The industry calls this group "concerned smokers" and seeks to retain them as customers.

Suggesting that addicts can reduce their risk by choosing to switch to another product (branded to suggest that it is less harmful or addictive) can reduce their cognitive dissonance and sense of lack of control, without offering a health improvement. Switching to a product branded to suggest that it is less harmful or addictive ("mild", "light", "low-tar", "filtered" etc.) is, in terms of health effects, meaningless.

=== Youth: new customers ===
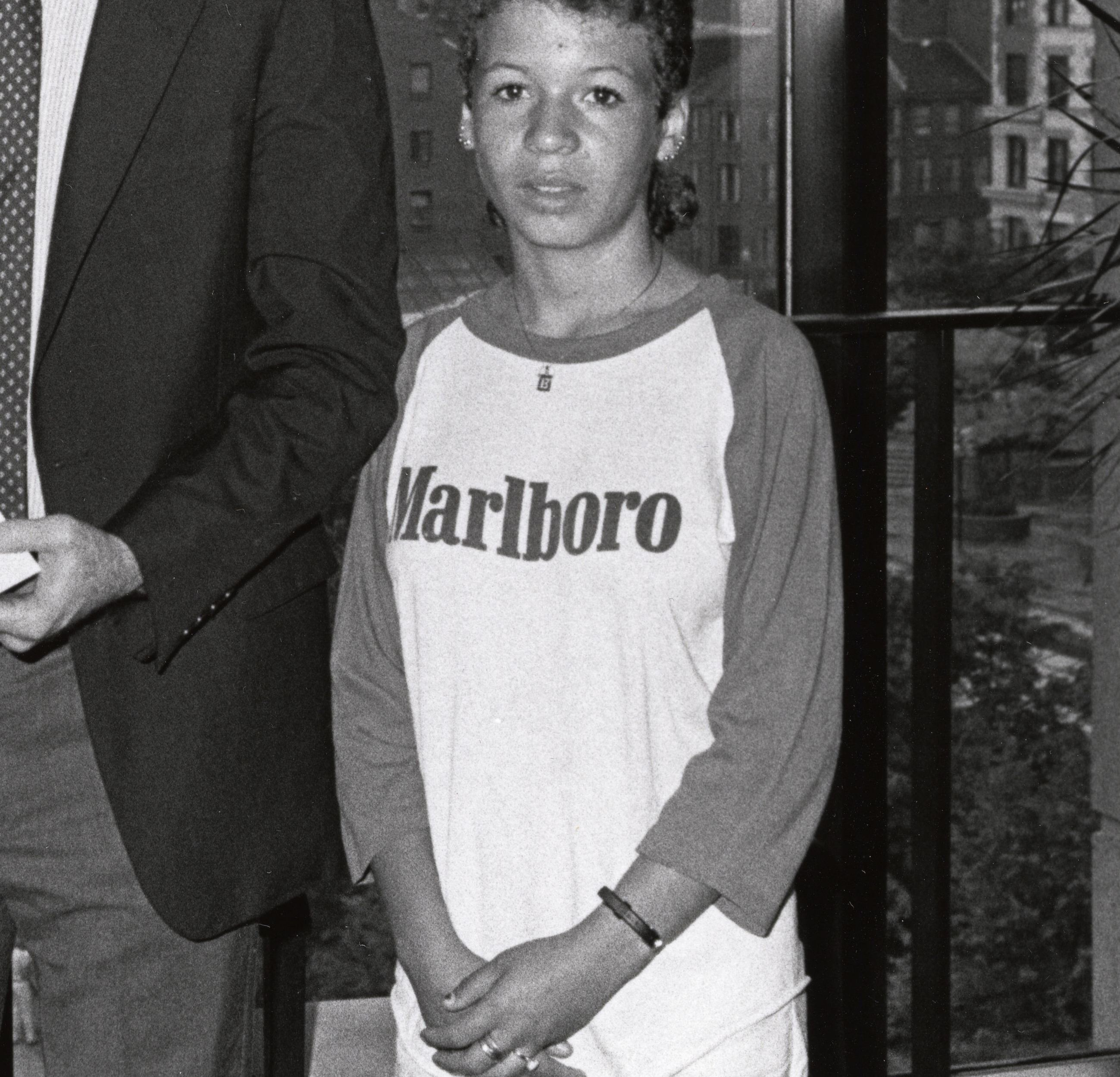
A girl wearing a Marlboro shirt in the 1980s. Owning and being willing to use promotional items is a significant risk factor for nicotine addiction.

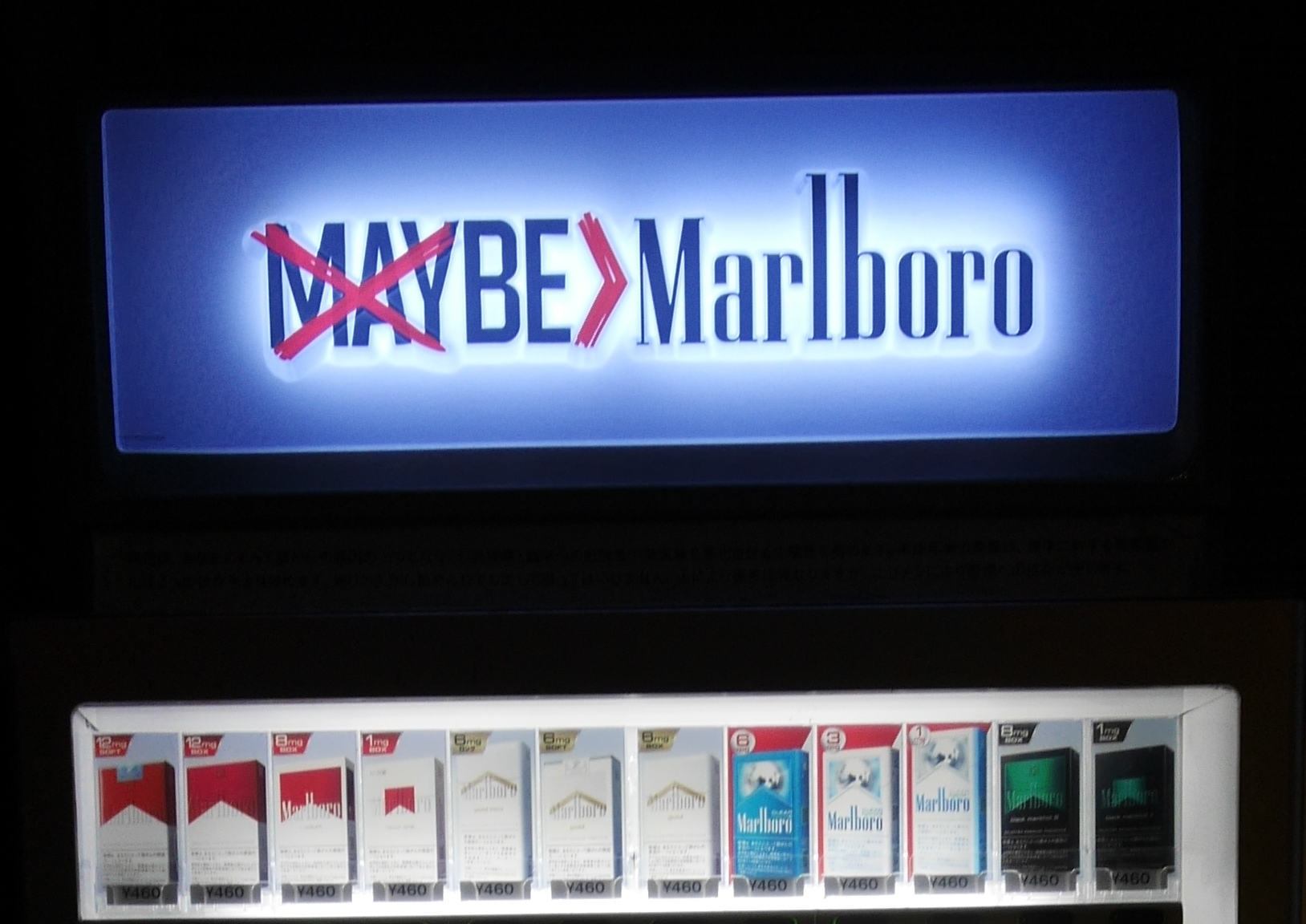
The marketing campaign "Don't be a Maybe. Be Marlboro." ran in 64 countries in the years 2010s.

The intended audience of tobacco advertising has changed throughout the years, with some brands specifically targeted towards a particular demographic. According to Reynolds American Inc, the Joe Camel campaign in the United States was created to advertise Camel brand to young adult smokers. Class action plaintiffs and politicians described the Joe Camel images as a "cartoon" intended to advertise the product to people below the legal smoking age. Under pressure from various anti-smoking groups, the Federal Trade Commission, and the U.S. Congress, Camel ended the campaign on 10 July 1997.

Vending machines, individually sold single cigarettes, and product displays near schools, next to candy and sweet drinks, and at the eye-level of young children are all used around the world to sell nicotine-containing products. Even large brands are frequently advertised in ways that break local regulations. In many countries, such marketing methods are not illegal. Where they are illegal, enforcement is often a problem. For instance, Dr. Suresh Kumar Arora, New Delhi's chief tobacco control officer, said: "We were wasting our time fining cigarette vendors and distributors. They had no idea of the law. Most are illiterate. Our teams would tear down posters and in no time, they would be up again because the real culprits were the big tobacco companies – ITC, Philip Morris (now Altria), Godfrey Phillip. I told them to stop giving posters to their dealers otherwise I would drag them through the courts. Since last May, Delhi has been free of tobacco posters, 100% free". He has, however, been unable to keep mobile vendors from illegally selling cigarettes next to schools.

Easily circumvented age verification at company websites enables minors to access and be exposed to marketing for e-cigarettes. Tobacco businesses intensely market e-cigarettes to youth using cartoon characters and candy flavors. E-cigarettes are also marketed on Facebook, where age restrictions are in many cases not implemented.

==== "Harm reduction" advertising ====
Some tobacco companies have sponsored ads that claim to discourage teen smoking. Such ads are unregulated. However, these ads have been shown, in independent studies, to increase the self-reported likelihood that teens will start smoking. They also cause adults to see tobacco companies as more responsible and less in need of regulation. Unlike promotional ads, tobacco companies do not track the effects of these ads themselves. These ads differ from independently produced antismoking ads in that they do not mention the health effects of smoking, and present smoking as exclusively an "adult choice", undesirable "if you're a teen". There is more exposure to industry-sponsored "antismoking" ads than to antismoking ads run by public health agencies.

Tobacco companies have also funded "anti-smoking" groups. One such organization, funded by Lorillard, entered into exclusive sponsorship agreements with sports organizations. This means that no other anti-smoking campaigns are allowed to be involved with the sporting organization. Such sponsorships have been criticized by health groups. Similarly, Philip Morris launched the 'Unsmoke' campaign which ostensibly acknowledges the dangers of tobacco smoking but otherwise encourages the use of "better alternatives" such as electronic cigarettes and heated tobacco. The campaign was criticised by anti-smoking advocacy groups as a mere public relations stunt in an attempt to rehabilitate their public image while at the same time continuing to market their traditional cigarettes and downplaying the possible harmful effects of heated tobacco.

=== Recapturing former smokers ===
Companies have also sought to recapture people who have successfully broken a nicotine dependency. Ex-smokers tend to view these attempts very negatively, and their existence has frequently been denied. Methods discussed in industry documents include price drops, increasing acceptance of smoking by nonsmokers, making products more socially acceptable, and making "healthier" cigarettes (scare quotes in original).

== Economics ==
As tobacco companies keep spending money on marketing until it stops being profitable, marginal changes in marketing typically have no measurable effect, but the total amount of marketing has a strong effect.

Econometric studies have been done into the endogeneity and other aspects of bans.

=== Budgets ===
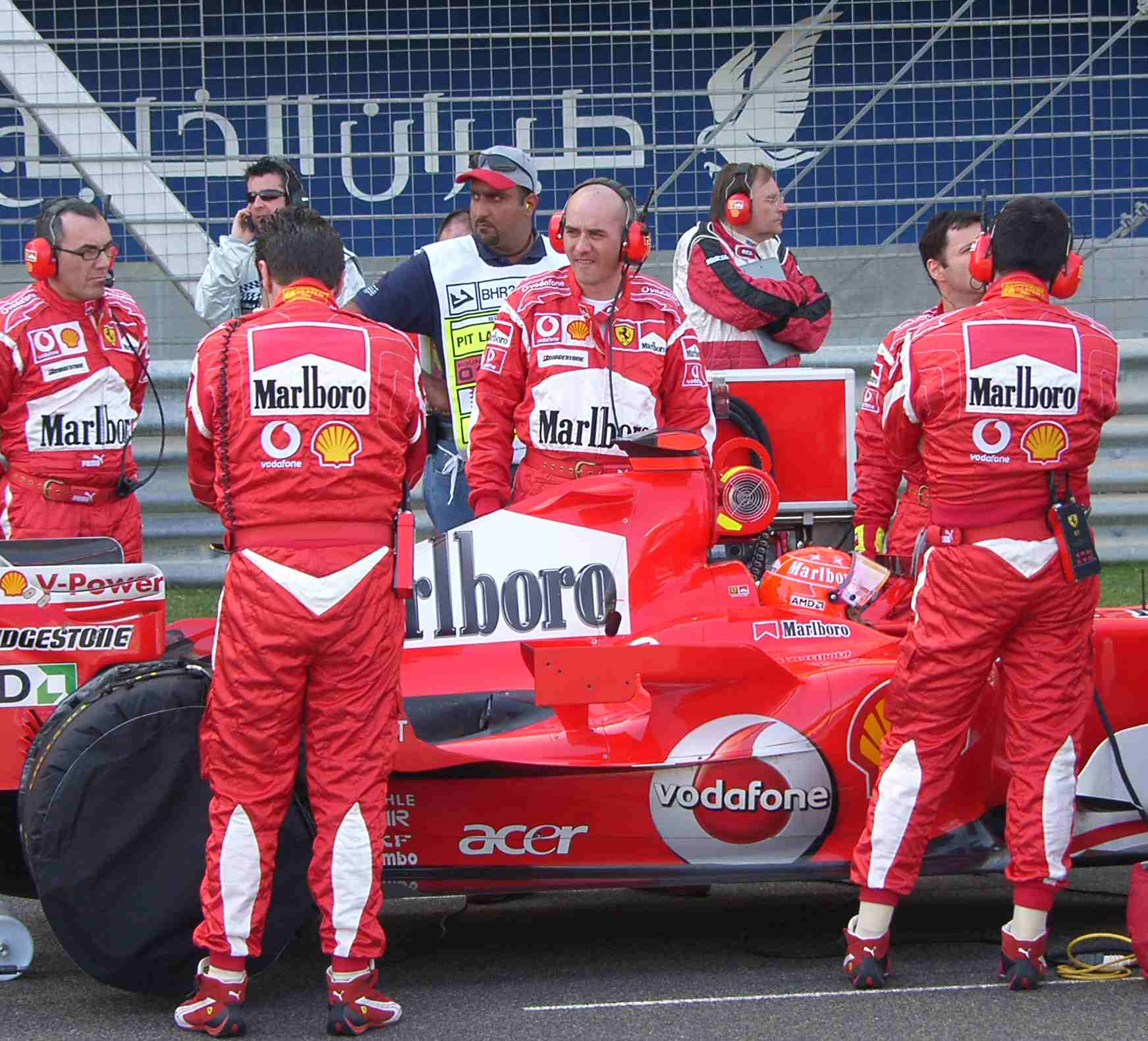
Though advertisements for cigarettes are banned in many countries, such advertising could still be seen in the sponsorship of events such as auto racing.

Tobacco companies have had particularly large budgets for their advertising campaigns. The Federal Trade Commission claimed that cigarette manufacturers spent $8.24 billion on advertising and promotion in 1999, the highest amount ever at that time. The FTC later claimed that in 2005, cigarette companies spent $13.11 billion on advertising and promotion, down from $15.12 billion in 2003, but nearly double what was spent in 1998. The increase, despite restrictions on the advertising in most countries, was an attempt at appealing to a younger audience, including multi-purchase offers and giveaways such as hats and lighters, along with the more traditional store and magazine advertising.

Marketing consultants ACNielsen announced that, during the period September 2001 to August 2002, tobacco companies advertising in the UK spent £25 million, excluding sponsorship and indirect advertising, broken down as follows:

- £11 million on press advertising
- £13.2 million on billboards
- £714,550 on radio advertising
- £106,253 on direct mail advertising

Figures from around that time also estimated that the companies spent £8m a year sponsoring sporting events and teams (excluding Formula One) and a further £70m on Formula One in the UK.

The £25 million spent in the UK amounted to approximately US$0.60 per person in 2002. The 15.12 billion spent in the United States in 2003 amounted to more than $45 for every person in the United States, more than $36 million per day, and more than $290 for each U.S. adult smoker.

Television and radio e-cigarette advertising in some countries may be indirectly advertising traditional cigarette smoking. A 2014 review said, "the e-cigarette companies have been rapidly expanding using aggressive marketing messages similar to those used to promote cigarettes in the 1950s and 1960s." In the US, six large e-cigarette businesses spent $59.3 million on promoting e-cigarettes in 2013. E-cigarettes are increasingly sold by the traditional tobacco multinationals.

== Gallery ==
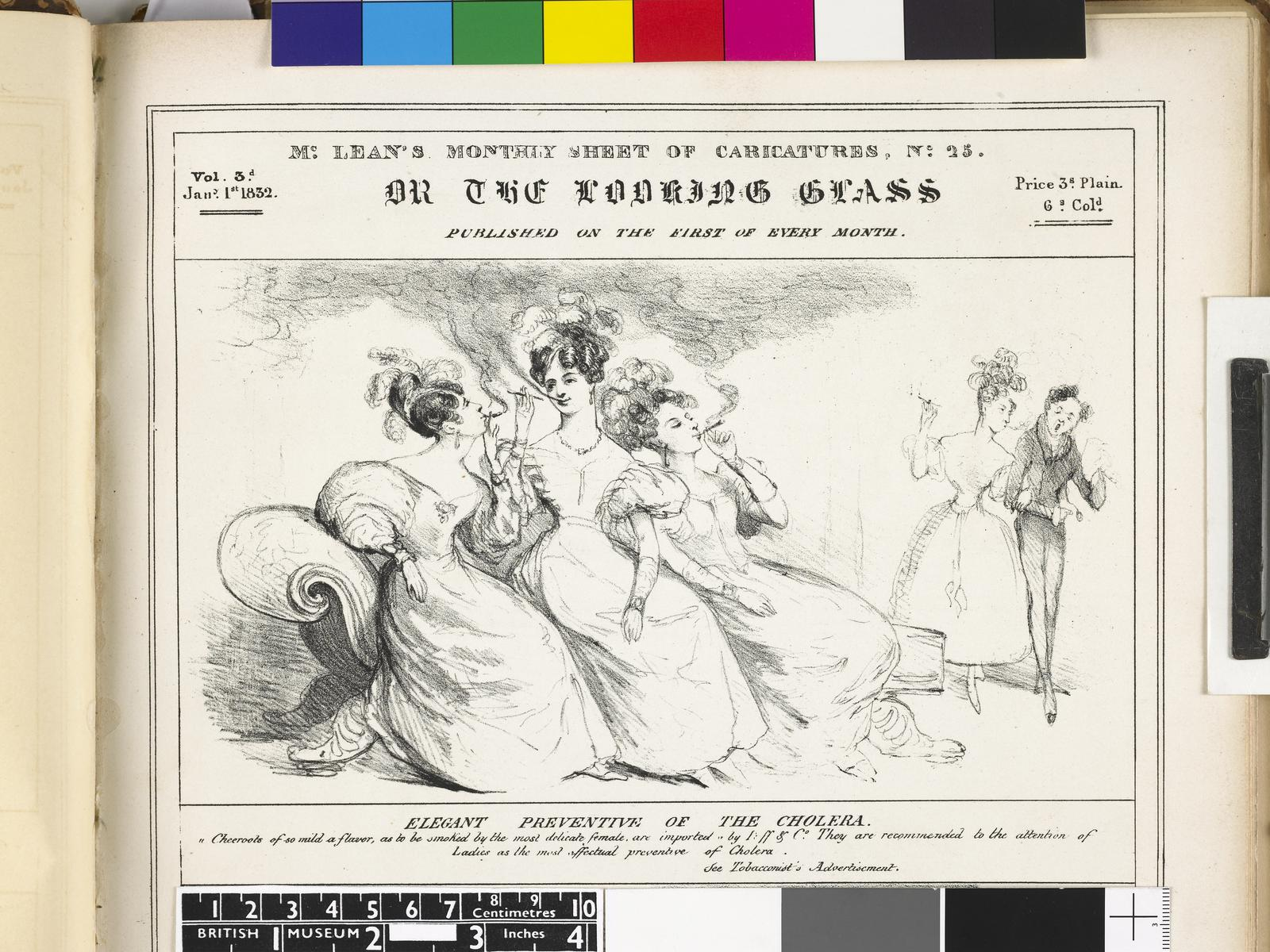
An 1832 advertisement claiming that cheroots offer protection against cholera

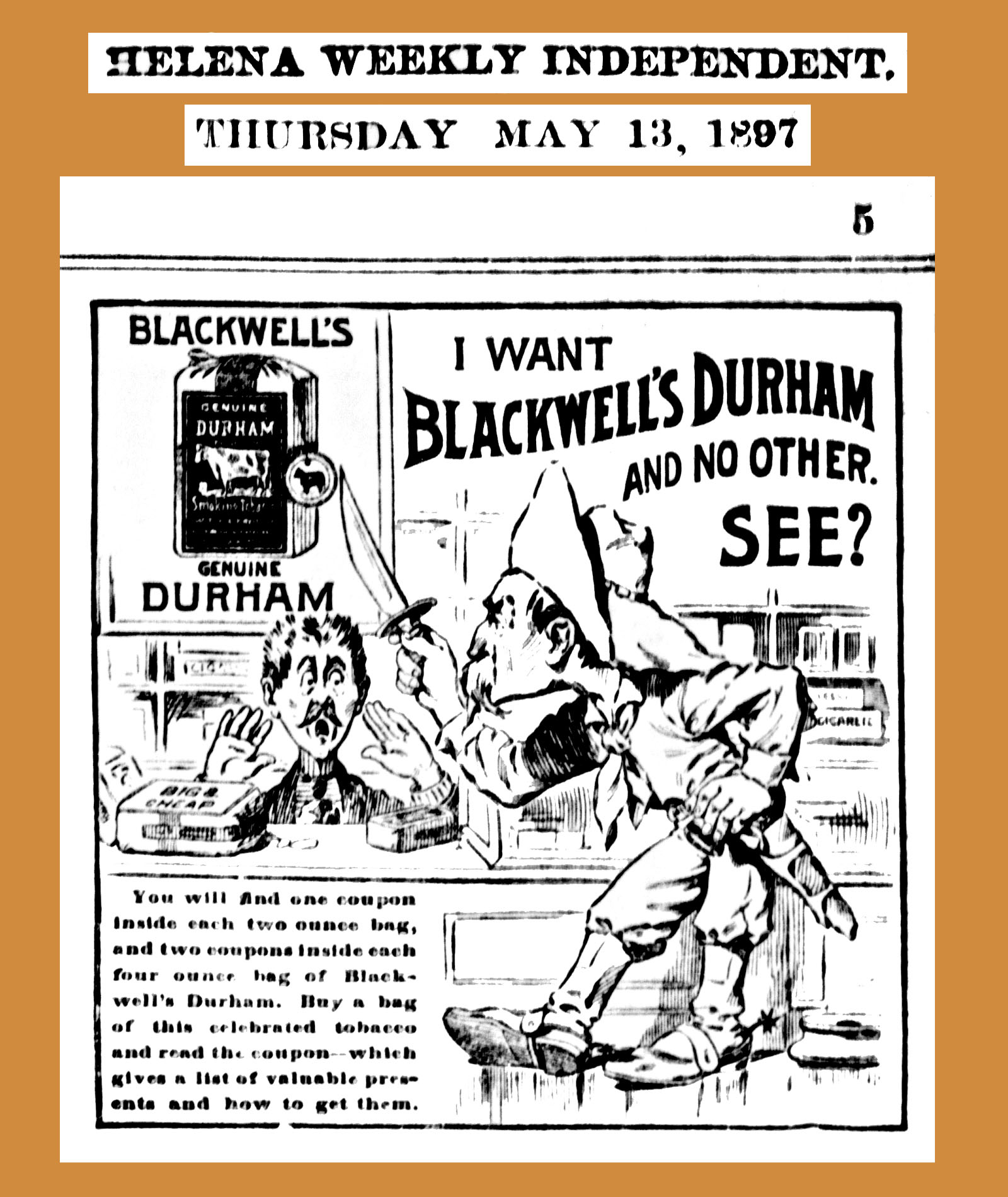
An 1897 newspaper display ad emphasizes the product's "genuine" nature

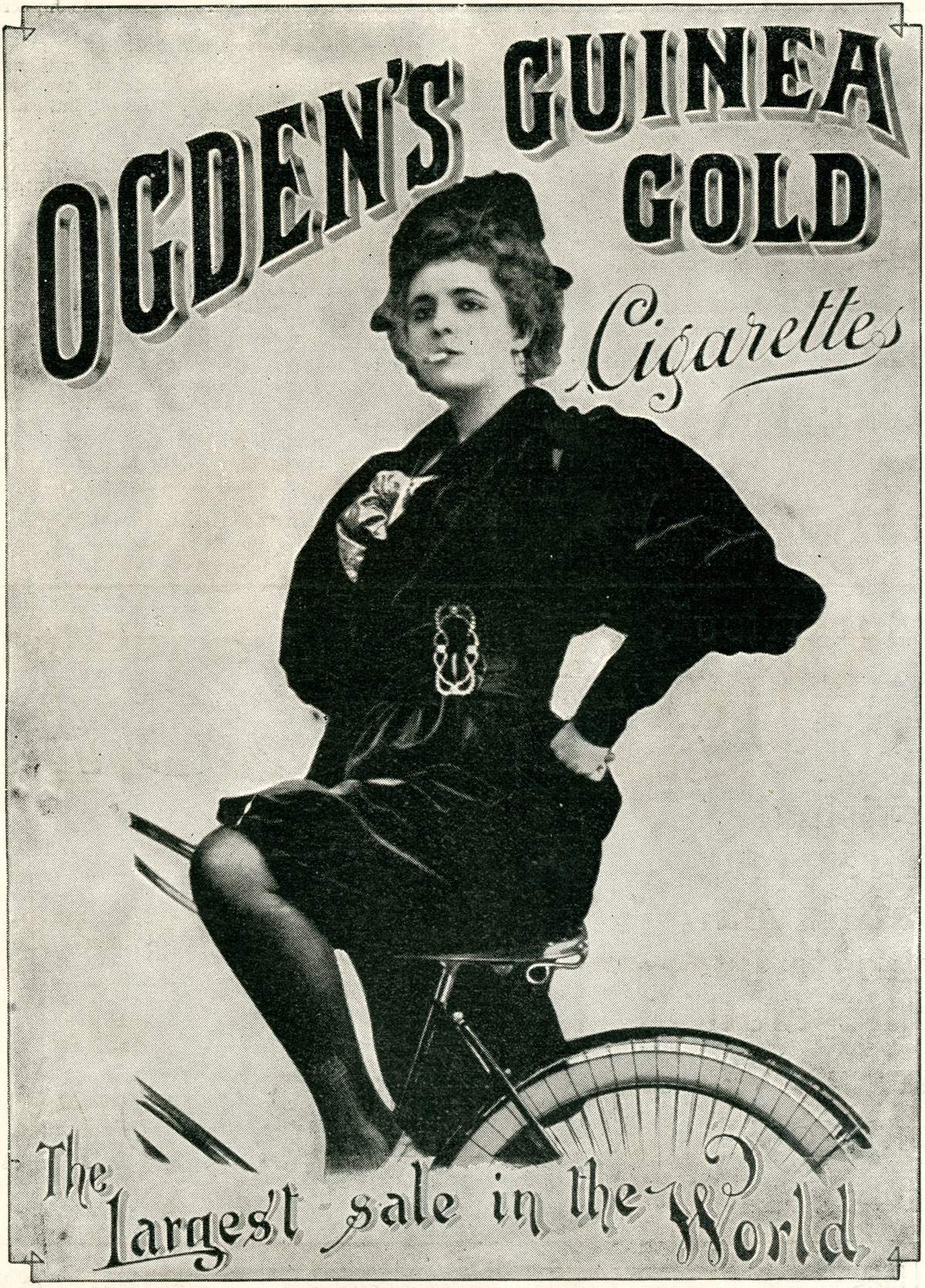
1900 cigarette ad targeting women

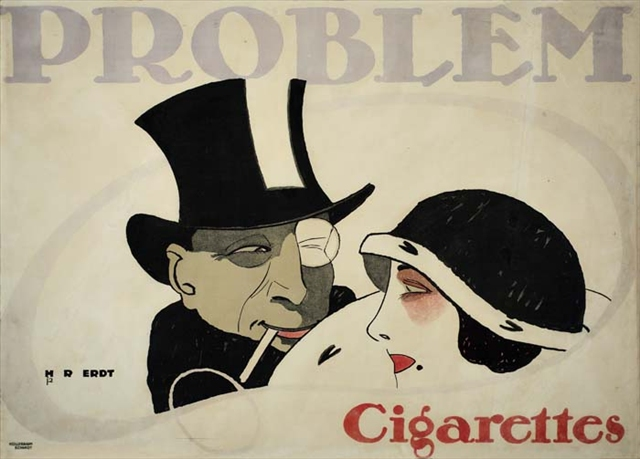
Hans Rudi Erdt: Problem Cigarettes, 1912

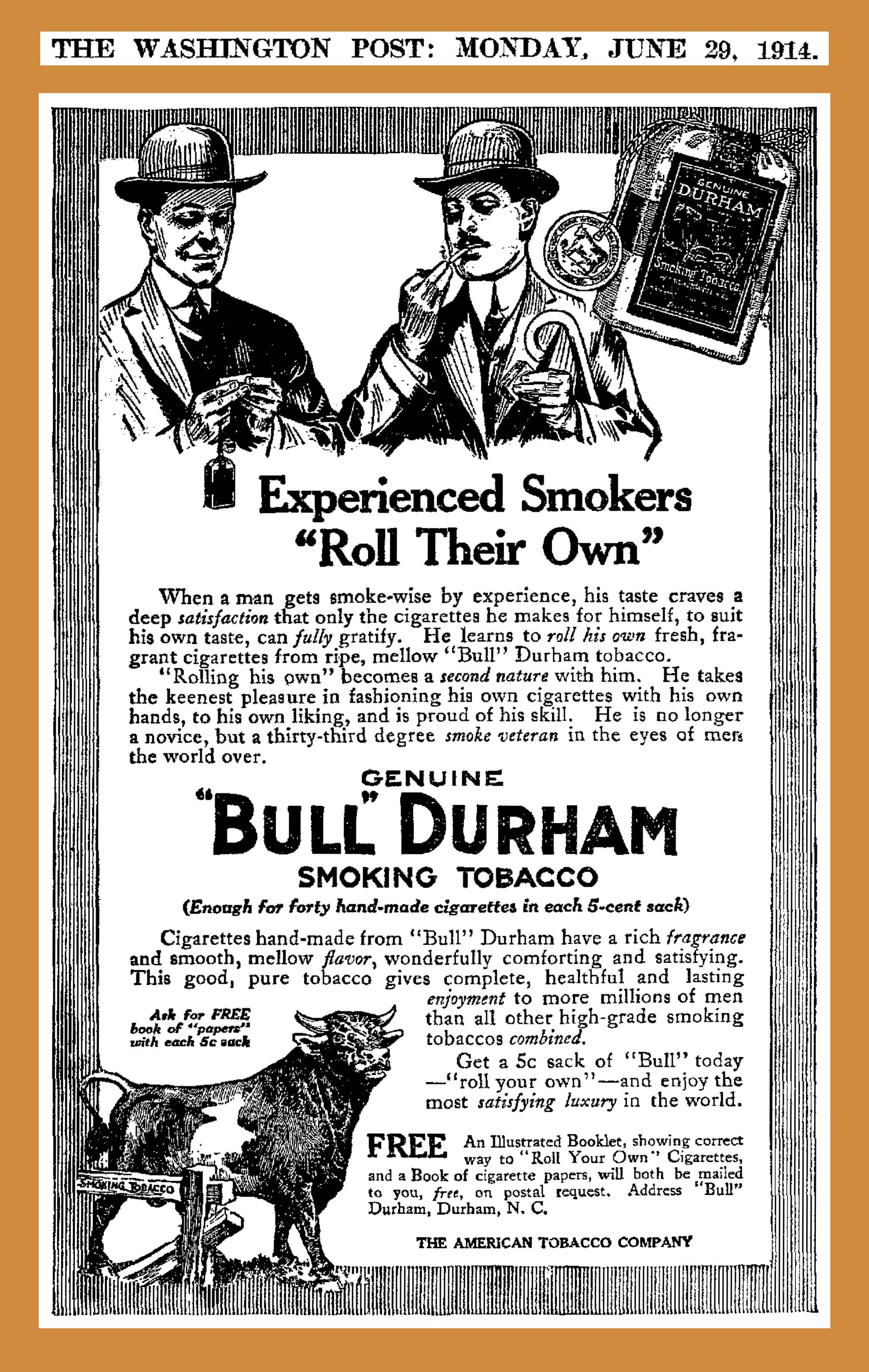
This 1914 display ad appealed to the experienced smoker—the "thirty-third degree smoke veteran"—touting the "satisfaction" derived only from making one's own cigarettes, calling the product "good, pure" tobacco that gives "complete, healthful and lasting enjoyment".

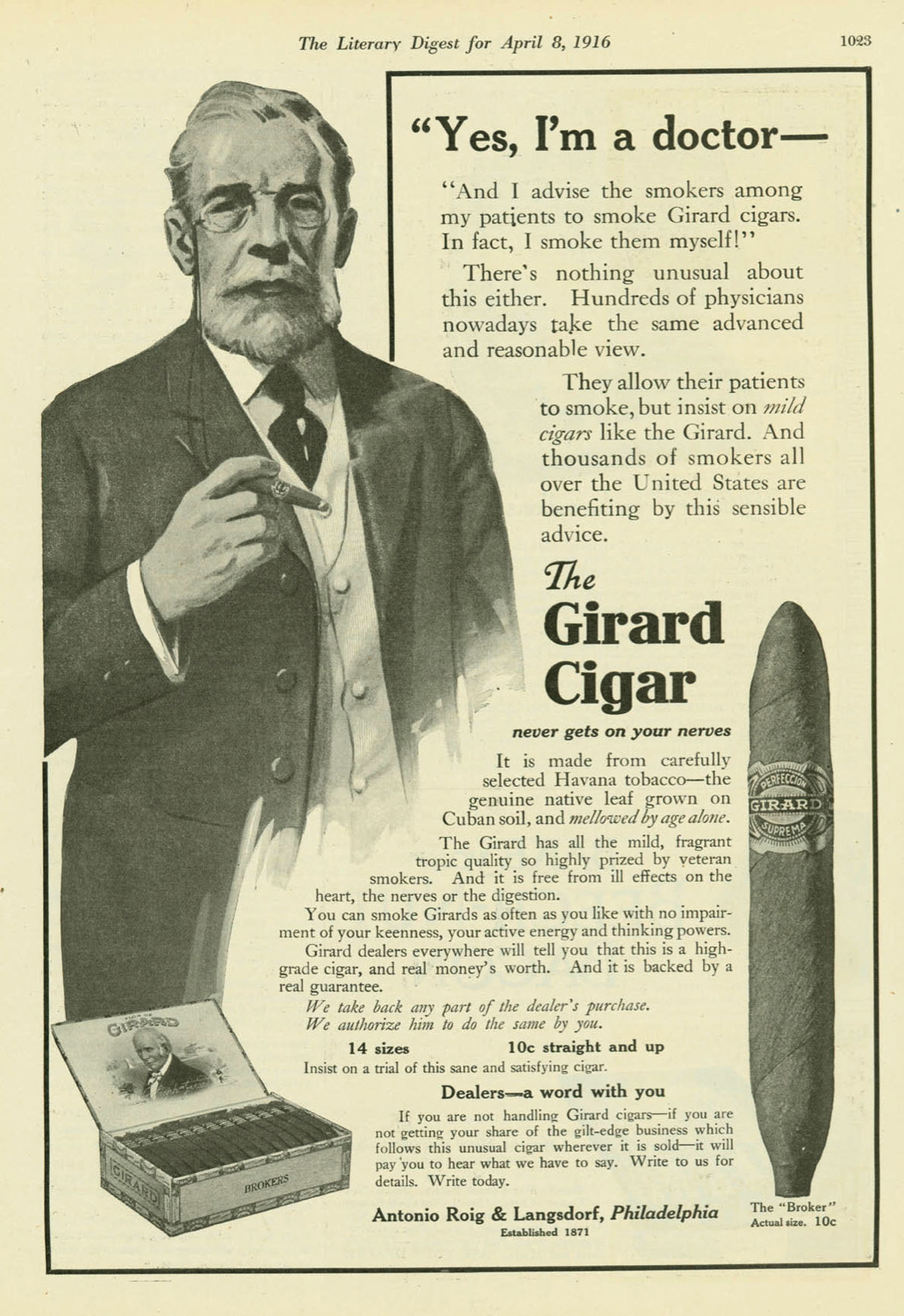
A 1916 ad showing a fictional doctor endorsing a cigar brand. At the time, it was considered a breach of medical ethics to advertise; doctors who did so would risk losing their license.

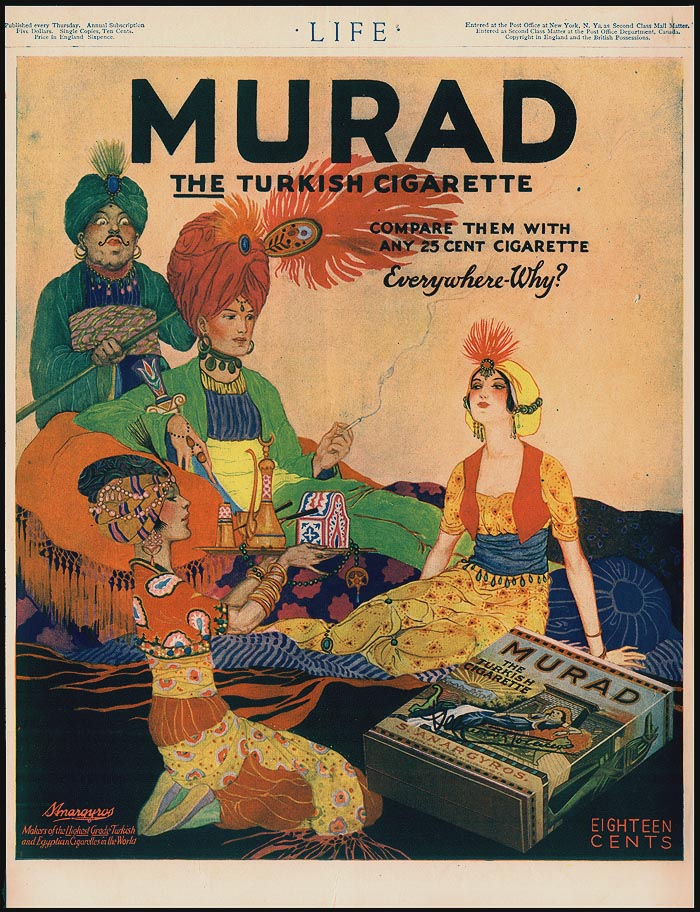
Advertisement for "Murad" Turkish cigarettes 1918

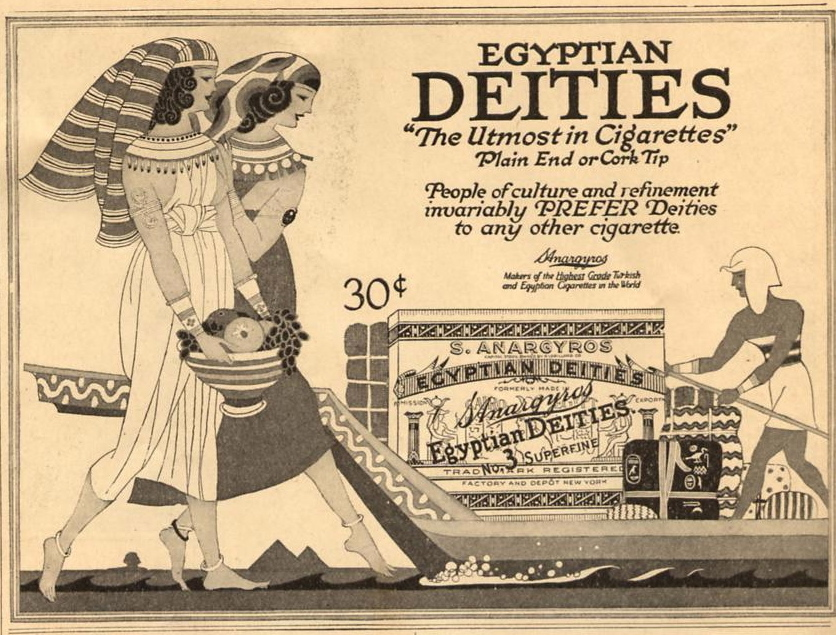
Advertisement for "Egyptian Deities" cigarettes 1919

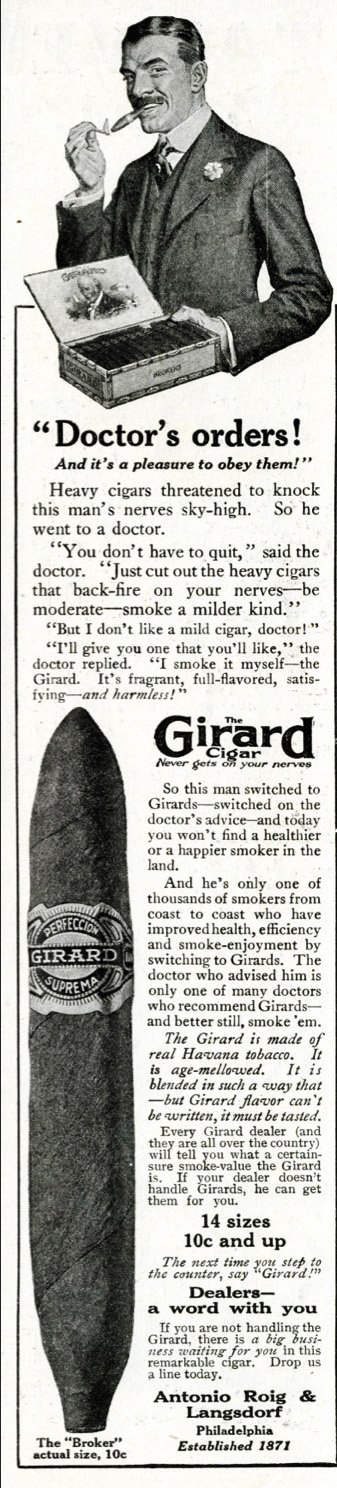
A 1921 cigar ad claiming that a fictional doctor called this brand "harmless" and "never gets on your nerves" (a term then used for nicotine withdrawal symptoms)

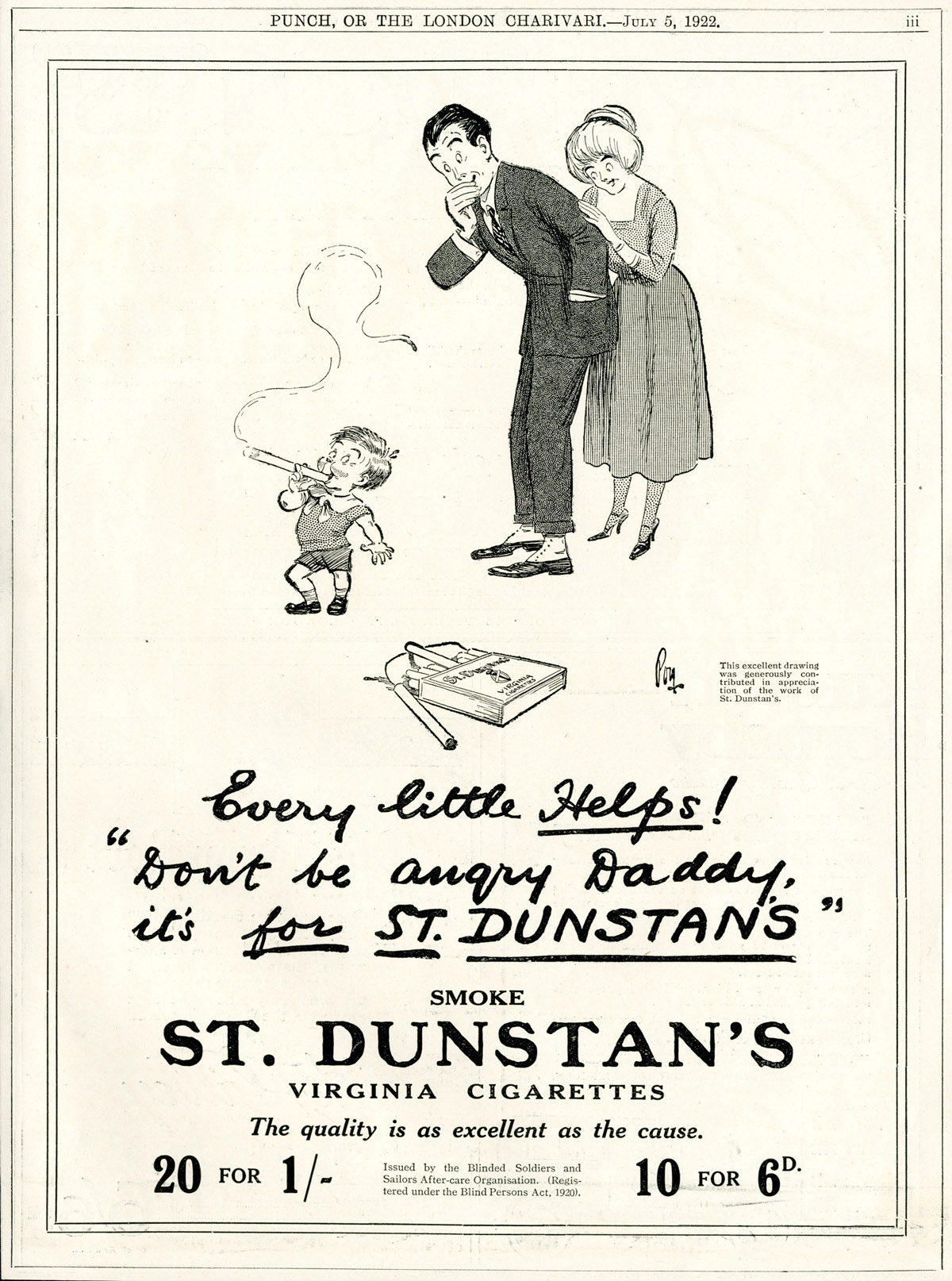
In a 1922 ad, a small child, smoking a cigarette, tells his amused parents not to worry, as he is smoking for a veteran's charity. Children were often used in early cigarette ads, where they helped normalize smoking as part of family living, and gave associations of purity, vibrancy, and life.

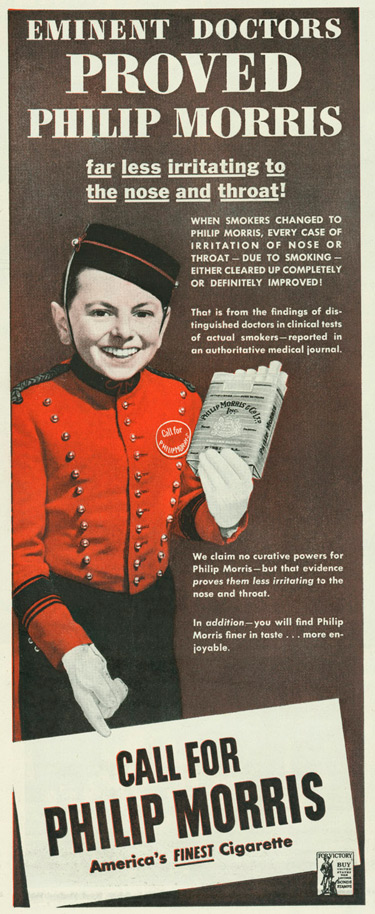
"We claim no curative powers for Phillip Morris" says this 1943 ad featuring actor Johnny Roventini, in the small text.

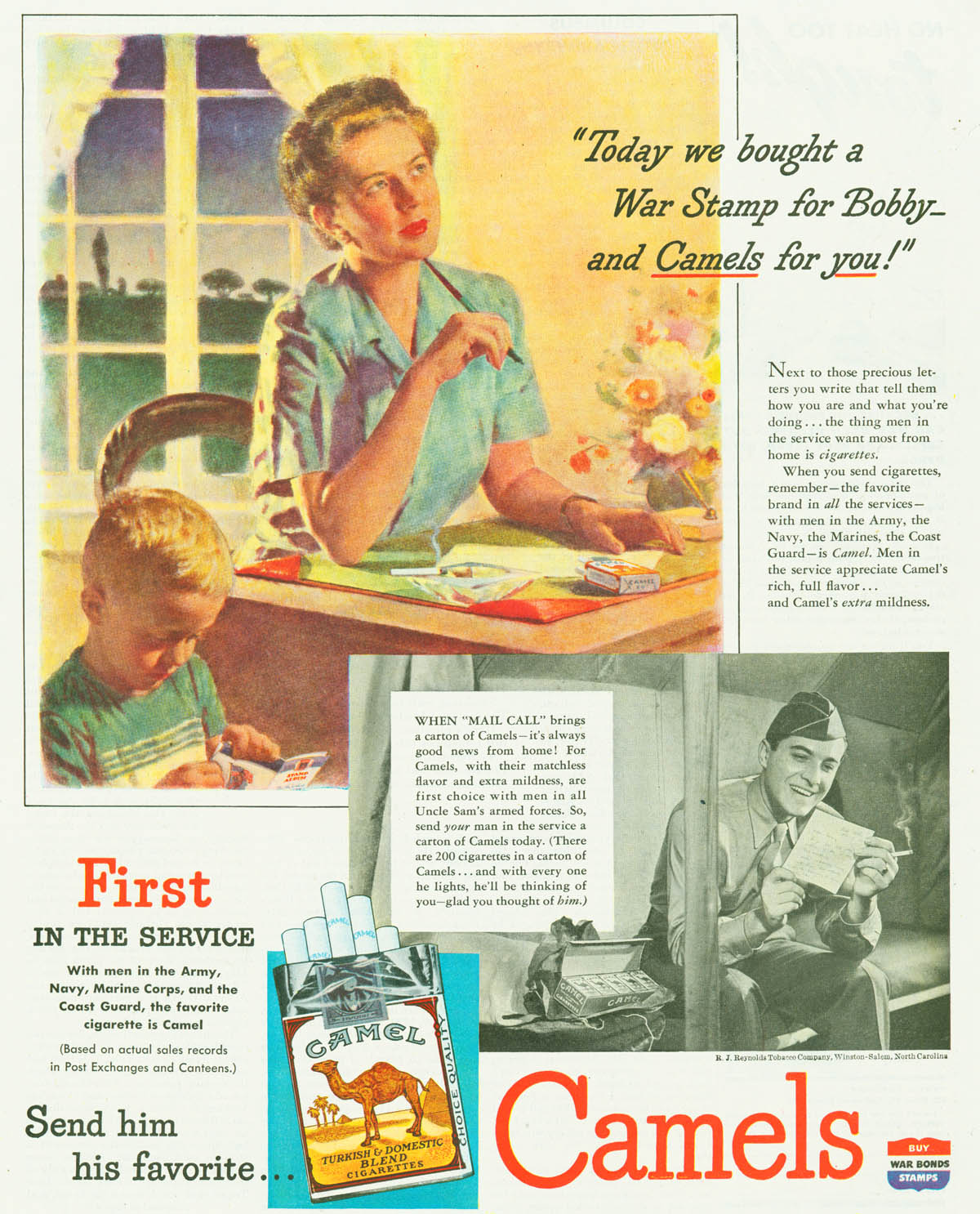
This WWII ad shows a woman sending her soldier husband a carton of cigarettes, and urges others to do the same. In an echo of the claim that doctors prefer the brand, it claims that men in the military prefer it, too. A mention of War Stamps associates the brand still more closely to war patriotism.

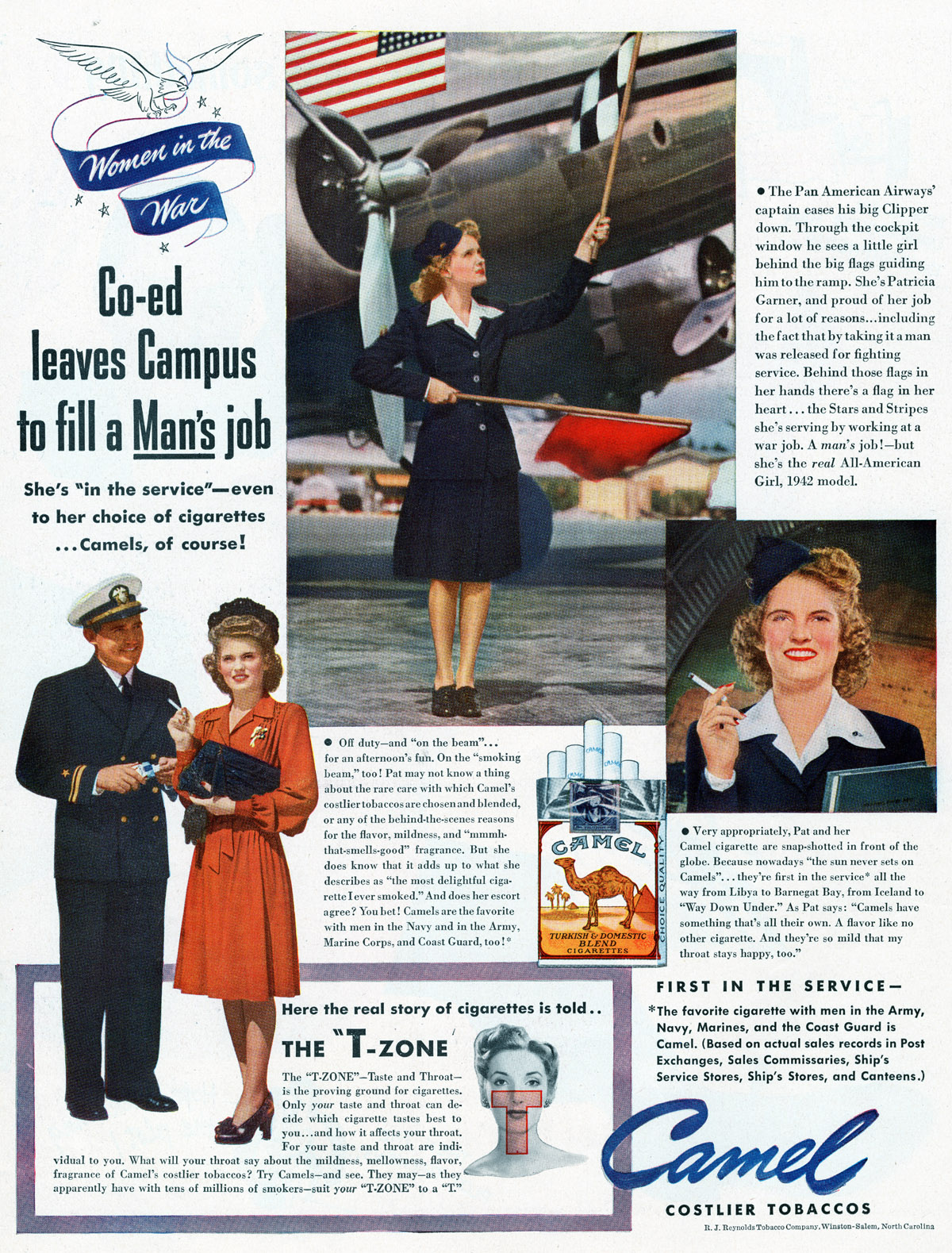
Women in the War cigarette ad showing a woman signalling civilian aircraft. The ad associates taking a "man's job" and smoking cigarettes like a man: "Co-ed leaves Campus to fill a Man's job. She's "in the service" -- even to her choice of cigarettes..."

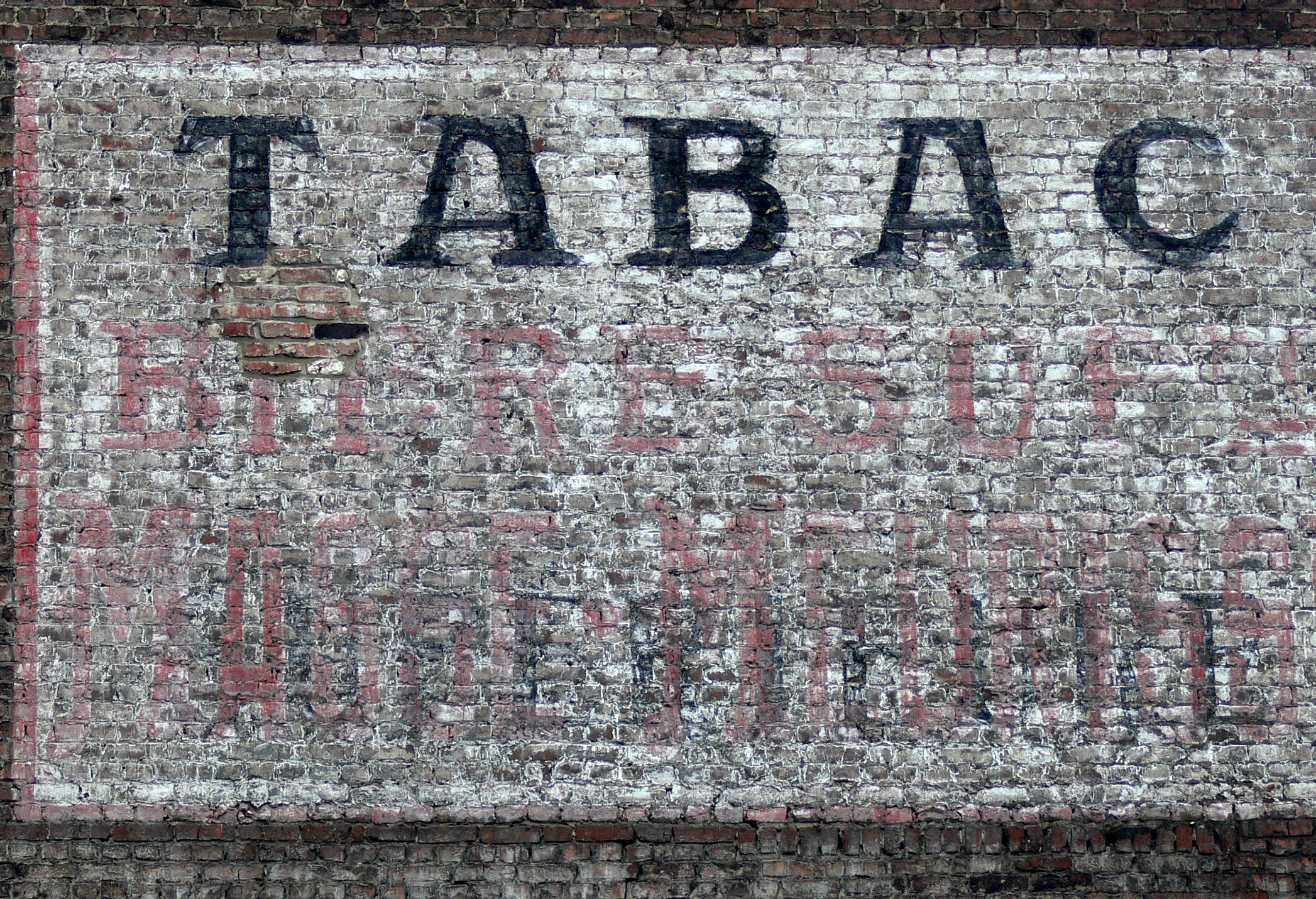
French painted mural advertisement

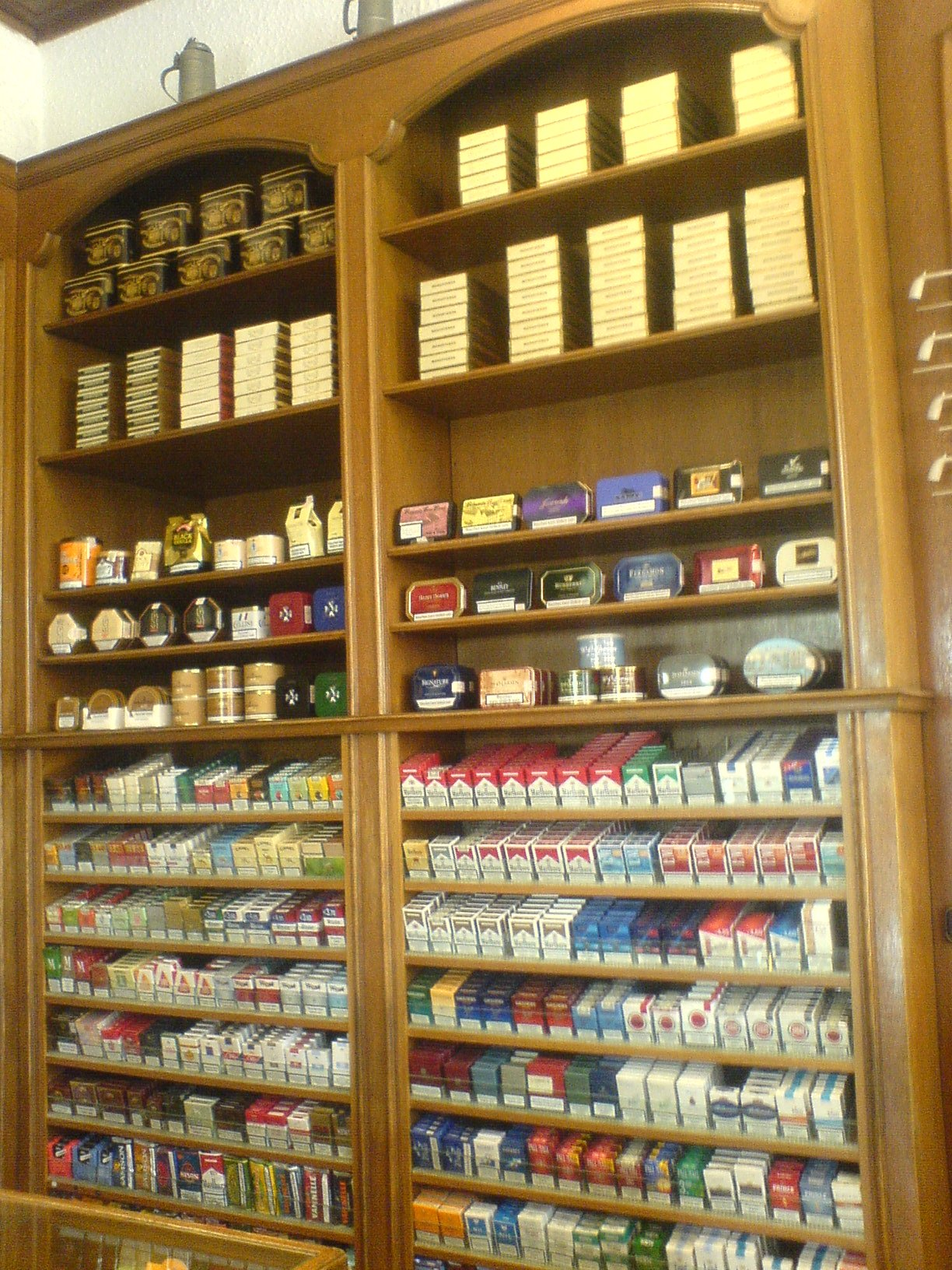
Tobacco display in a store Munich in 2008

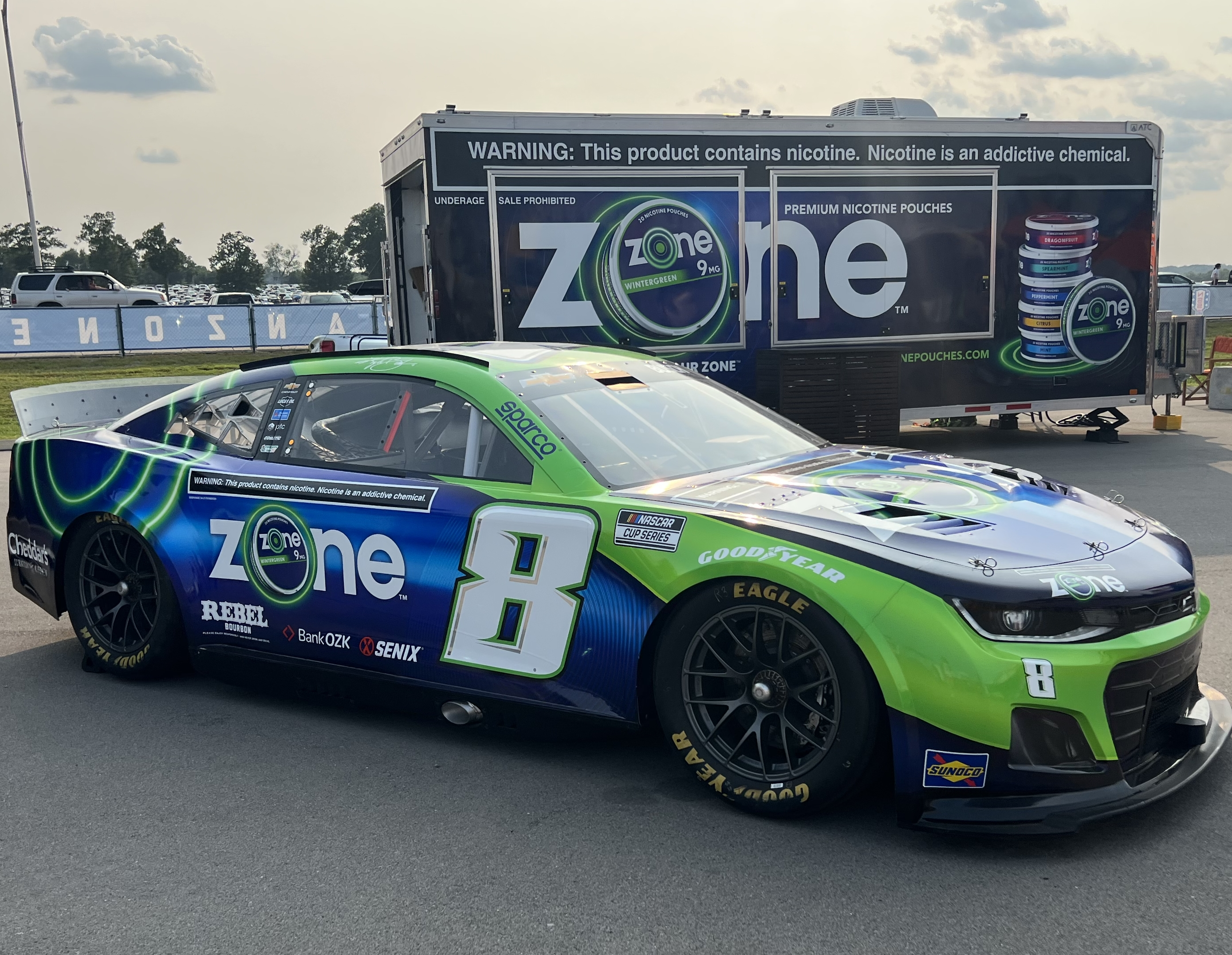
Nicotine pouches advertisement on a racing car, Nashville, 2025.

== See also ==
- List of tobacco-related topics
- Advertising to children
- Cigarette advertising in Indonesia
- Cigarette packets in Australia
- Electronic cigarette and e-cigarette liquid marketing
- Foundation for a Smoke-Free World
- Framework Convention on Tobacco Control
- History of nicotine marketing
- Philip Morris v. Uruguay
- Plain tobacco packaging
- Regulation of nicotine marketing
- Smoking ban
- Thank You For Smoking
- Tobacco marketing and African Americans
- Tobacco packaging warning messages
- Tobacco usage in sport
- Torches of Freedom
- Jeff Wigand – former tobacco company executive and whistleblower
