= Cigarette advertising in Indonesia =

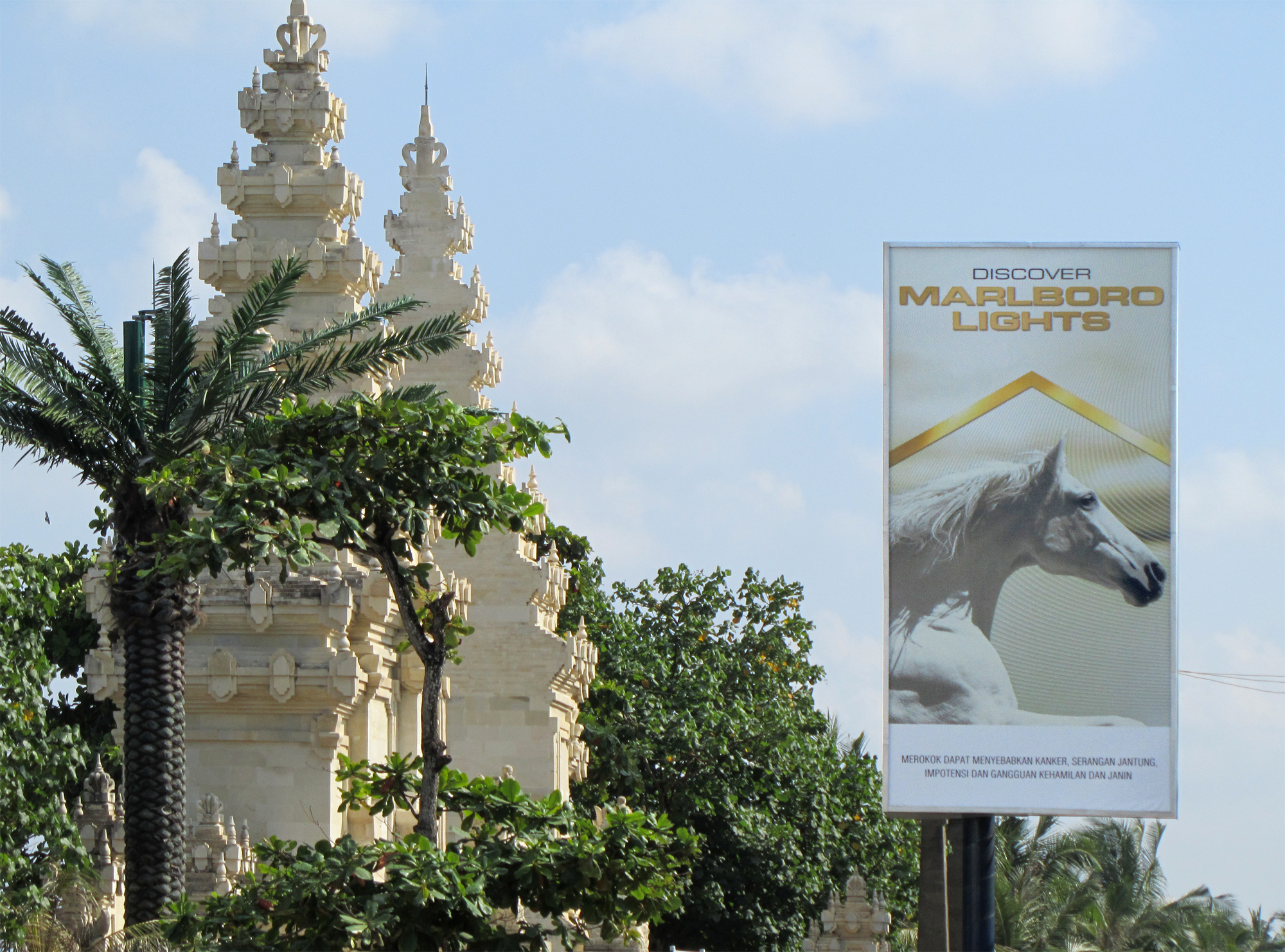
Marlboro Lights advertisement near Legian Beach Hotel, Bali. Notice that the warning text meaning "smoking can cause cancer, heart attacks, impotence, and disorder of pregnancy and fetus" is placed bottom in the advertisement, although the advertisement itself does not depict cigarettes.

Cigarette advertising in Indonesia is presently allowed. Aside from conventional cigarettes, advertisements of electric cigarettes are also allowed. However, it is prohibited to show conventional cigarettes only, and all advertisements must include smoking warning messages. In Indonesia itself, such advertisements are known under the name iklan rokok in Indonesian. In 2003, cigarette advertising and promotions in Indonesia was valued at $250 million. In addition to television and outdoor advertisements, sporting and entertainment events sponsored by cigarette brands or companies also occur in disguise of alternate names.

According to the mayor of Bogor, Bima Arya Sugiarto in 2021, smoking attempts among children and teens under 18 years are mostly caused by seeing cigarette advertisements and promotions. Cigarette advertisements are also considered to be the most manipulative, according to the Indonesian Consumer Organization (YLKI) in 2017.

== Regulation ==
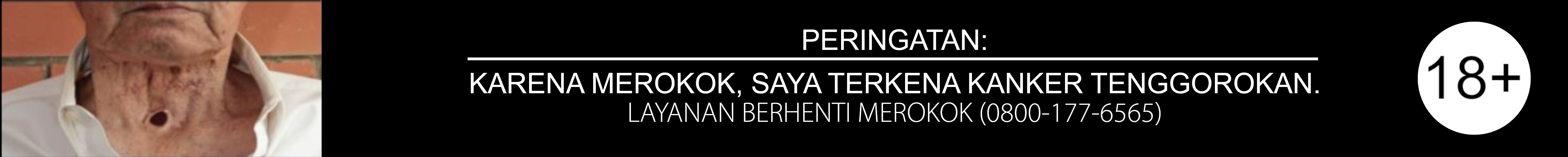
Warning seen in current advertisements, used since late 2018

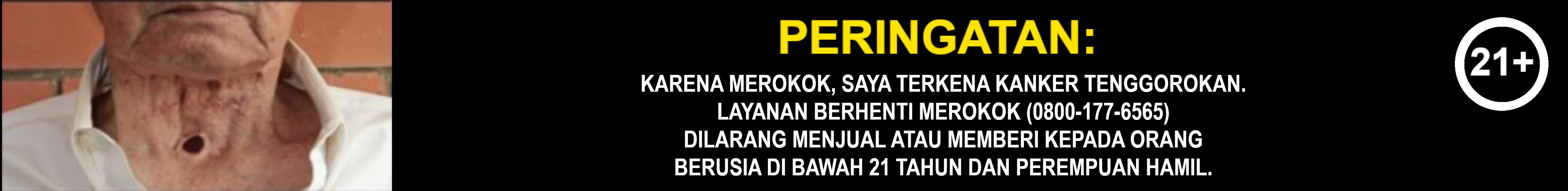
Warning seen in current advertisements, used shortly after Gov. Regulation No. 28/2024 had passed

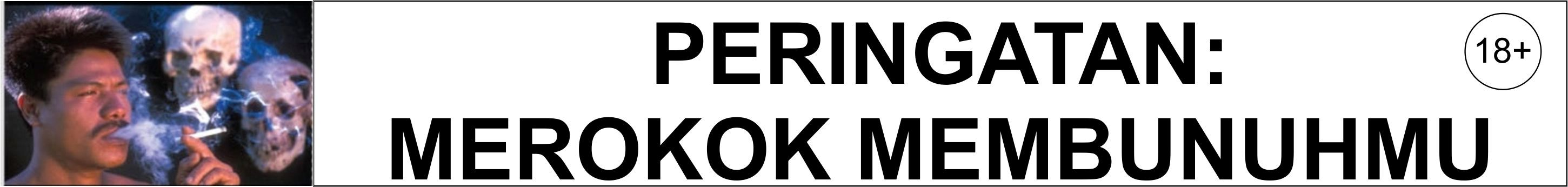
Warning used from late 2013 to 2018

Per Article 46 of the Indonesian Broadcasting Law, cigarette advertisements are prohibited from showing cigarette packaging or smoking scenes, with the exception of the Peringatan: Merokok Membunuhmu (Warning: Smoking kills you) warning used by advertisements during 2013 to 2018, which features the image of a man smoking in front of skulls. It has been replaced ever since with image of a laryngeal cancer survivor underwent laryngectomy, due to presumed contradictive effect for promoting smoking. Until 2024, it says: Peringatan: Karena Merokok, Saya Terkena Kanker Tenggorokan, followed by a toll-free quitline number operated by the Ministry of Health. Mentioning the product as cigarettes is also prohibited, with the exception of warning messages that already mentioned the Indonesian word for smoking, merokok. This rule was technically violated by a Sukun Merah Wangi advertisement dated from early 2010s, of which was possibly only aired on certain local TV stations. The word kretek is not covered by this rule, and thus commonly used by the cigarette advertisements to refer their product type, such as "Djarum Super Kretek" or "Gudang Garam International Kretek".

Cigarette advertisements are also prohibited from showing children, pregnant women, cartoon characters, cigarette recommendations or misleading words. The sizes of billboards are not allowed to be more than 72 m^{2} (780 sq ft). Advertisements of promotion strategies of cigarette companies are classified as "cigarette advertisements". In addition, cigarette advertisements must include a warning message shown on the cigarette package, per Indonesian Government Regulation number 109 of 2012. Such warning messages are shown at bottom or top position (also in the case of outdoor advertisements even before 2013), or after TV advertisements until the end of 2013 and returned since late 2024. Advertisements are prohibited from displaying cigarettes, cigarette and other tobacco product packs, the shape of cigarettes, tobacco product branding, or smoking in general.

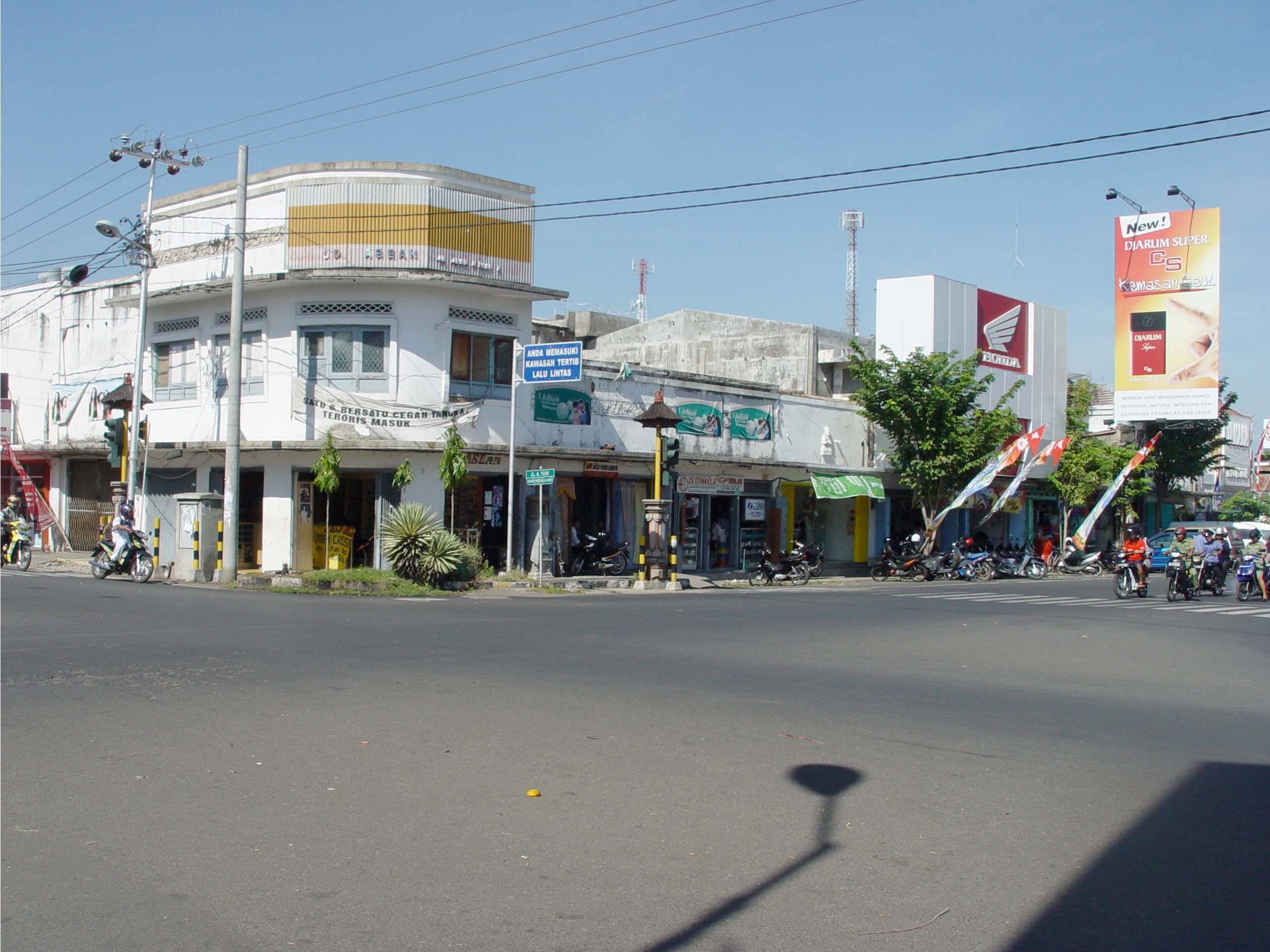
Street view in Singaraja, Bali, with a Djarum Super Compact Size advertisement in the far right, captured in 2005, reading: New! Djarum Super CS, kemasan gaul (the kemasan gaul means "(with) trendy packaging"), the advertisement itself was a mix of Indonesian and English.

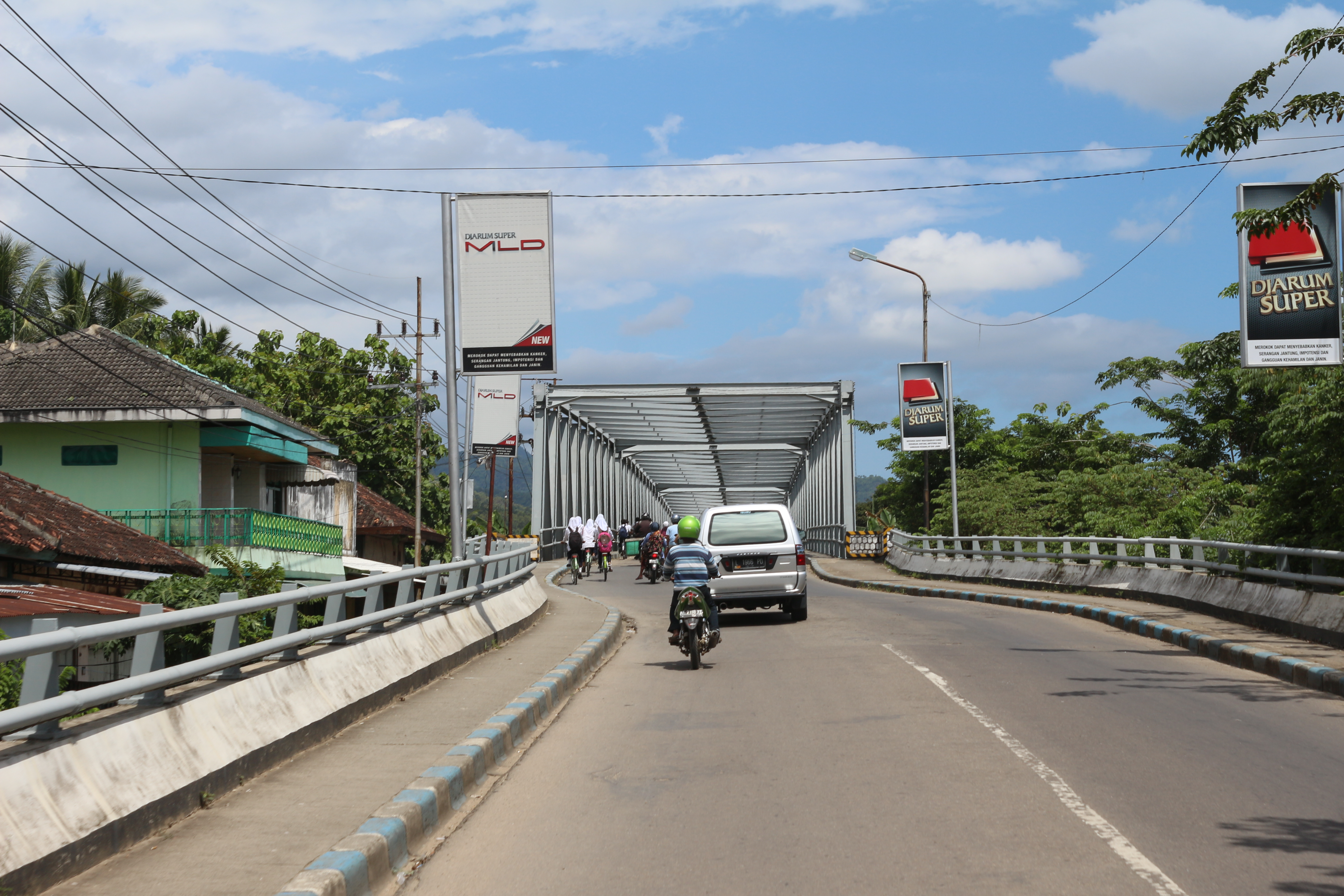
Djarum Super MLD and Djarum Super outdoor advertisements in a bridge in Arjowinangun, Pacitan Regency

Such cigarette advertisements are only allowed to air on television channels from 21:30 until 05:00 local time. It is commonly called "adult broadcast hours" because it is allowed by laws and rules to advertise adult products during the time. However, national, Jakarta-based television networks almost always stop airing cigarette advertisements after 03:00 a.m., probably due to its closer time to 05:00 a.m. in eastern Indonesia, as well as during sahur times throughout ramadhan. Also, local TV stations in Indonesia, such as JTV, Bali TV, and PJTV, rarely air cigarette advertisements.

The latest health regulation (Gov. Regulation No. 28/2024) was passed by President Joko Widodo on 26 July 2024. The regulation prohibits selling or promoting all tobacco products and electronic cigarettes for people under 21 and pregnant women. Additionally, the regulation also outlawed cigarette advertisements on social media networks, and restricts cigarette advertisements on television networks and jumbotrons from 21:30 until 00:00 local time. The tobacco warning must be in the full screen if the advertisement is a motion picture displayed on television and videotrons, or 15% for printed media.

In May 2025, the World Health Organization (WHO) praised Indonesia for the implementation of the Gov. Regulation No. 28/2024, which also under Article 435, provides a solid legal foundation for Indonesia to adopt standardized packaging. Tobacco industry stakeholders in Indonesia rejected the regulation and warned policymakers that there would be prolonged contractions. The WHO stated that Indonesia needs to implement plain packaging as the next step to Article 435.

Since 2013, the Indonesian Broadcasting Commission has appealed all national TV and radio networks to temporarily cease broadcasting cigarette advertisements every 31 May, coinciding with the World No Tobacco Day.

== Contents ==
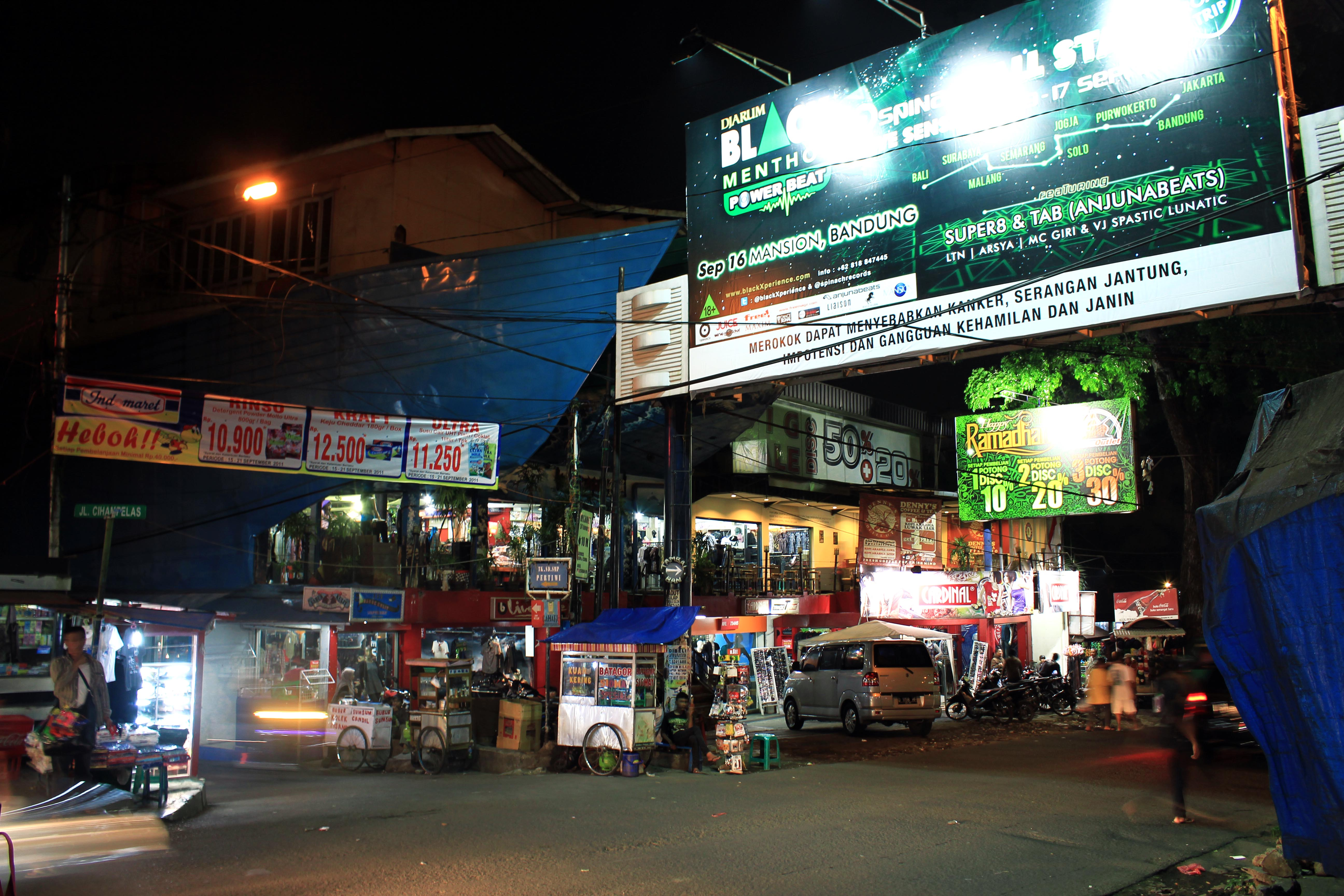
September 2011 advertisement for the Djarum Black Menthol Power Beat event in Bandung

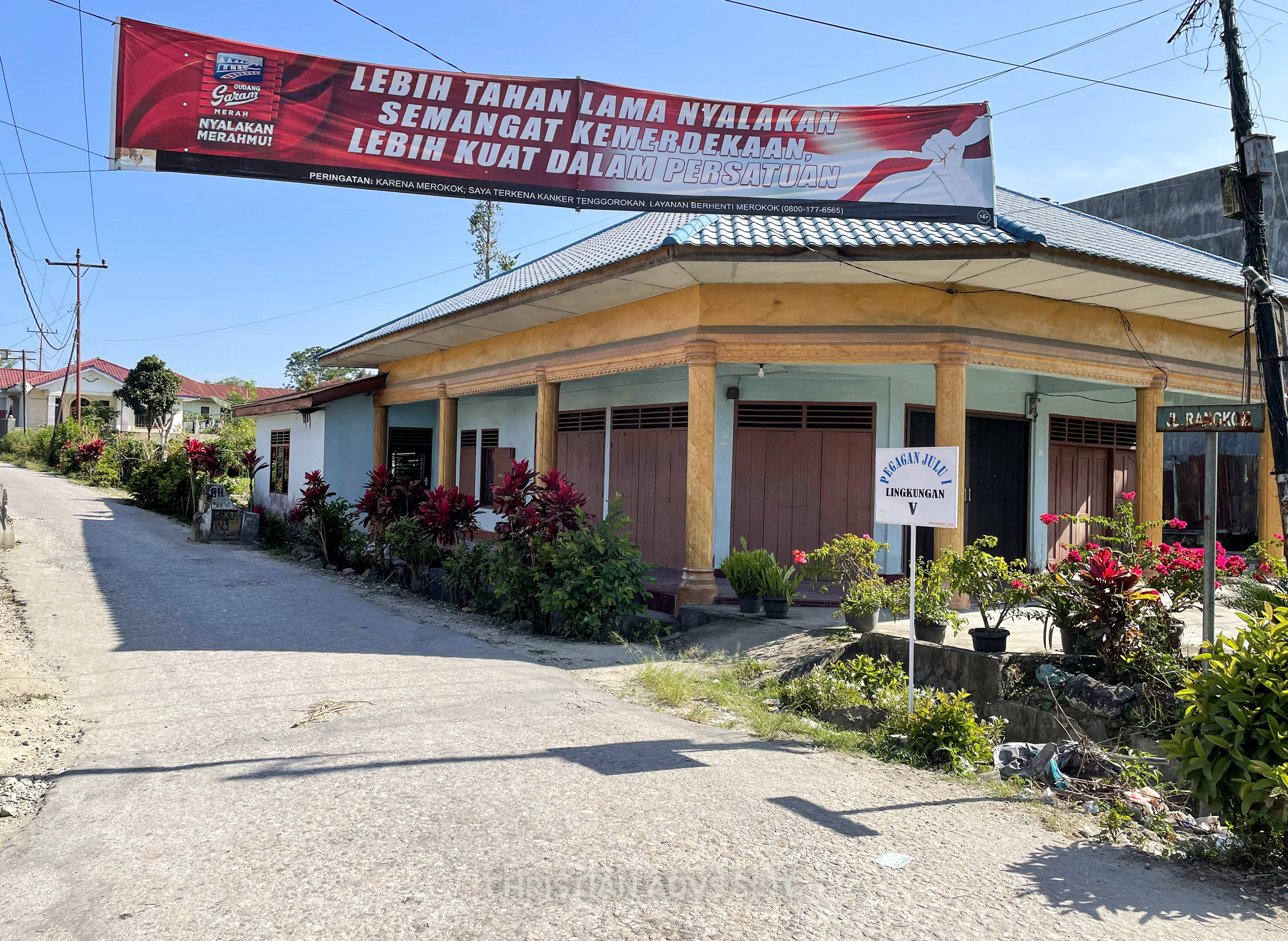
Gudang Garam Merah advertisement at Sumbul, Dairi Regency, reading: "turn on longer the independence spirit, stronger in unity"

Early Indonesian cigarette advertisements used to display the cigarette packaging and cigarettes before being prohibited. Currently, advertisements mostly feature motivational messages, social criticisms, and sometimes adventure (as in Djarum Super) as well as animation.

A Mild advertisements, known by one of their slogans Go Ahead since 2009, feature social criticisms and motivational quotes. Similarly, Djarum 76 advertisements also mostly feature satire social criticisms, but also include a character named Om Jin (played by Totos Rasiti). Djarum Super and Gudang Garam International advertisements, however, mainly feature action and adventure scenes instead. Sampoerna Hijau (lit. "Green Sampoerna") advertisements feature friendship between the members of the Geng Hijau ("Green Gang").

Some cigarette advertisements had been controversial. A 2015 advertisement of A Mild featured the text Mula-mula malu-malu lama-lama mau "shy at first, later wants (it)" and a still image of an almost-kissing couple, which caused inhabitants of the surrounding area to consider the advertisement as immoral.

Smokeless tobacco and smoked tobacco products in Indonesia packaging warnings must cover 40% and contain picture and text warnings. It is not required though that the warning or message be placed where is may not be damaged or hidden when the pack is opened.

== Sponsorships ==
Government Regulation No. 109 of 2012 defines that tobacco products are prohibited to sponsor sporting or entertainment events. However, it has been since violated as companies use alternate names when sponsoring such events while maintaining its brand image such as logo, slogan or color schemes.

== Local ban of advertisements ==
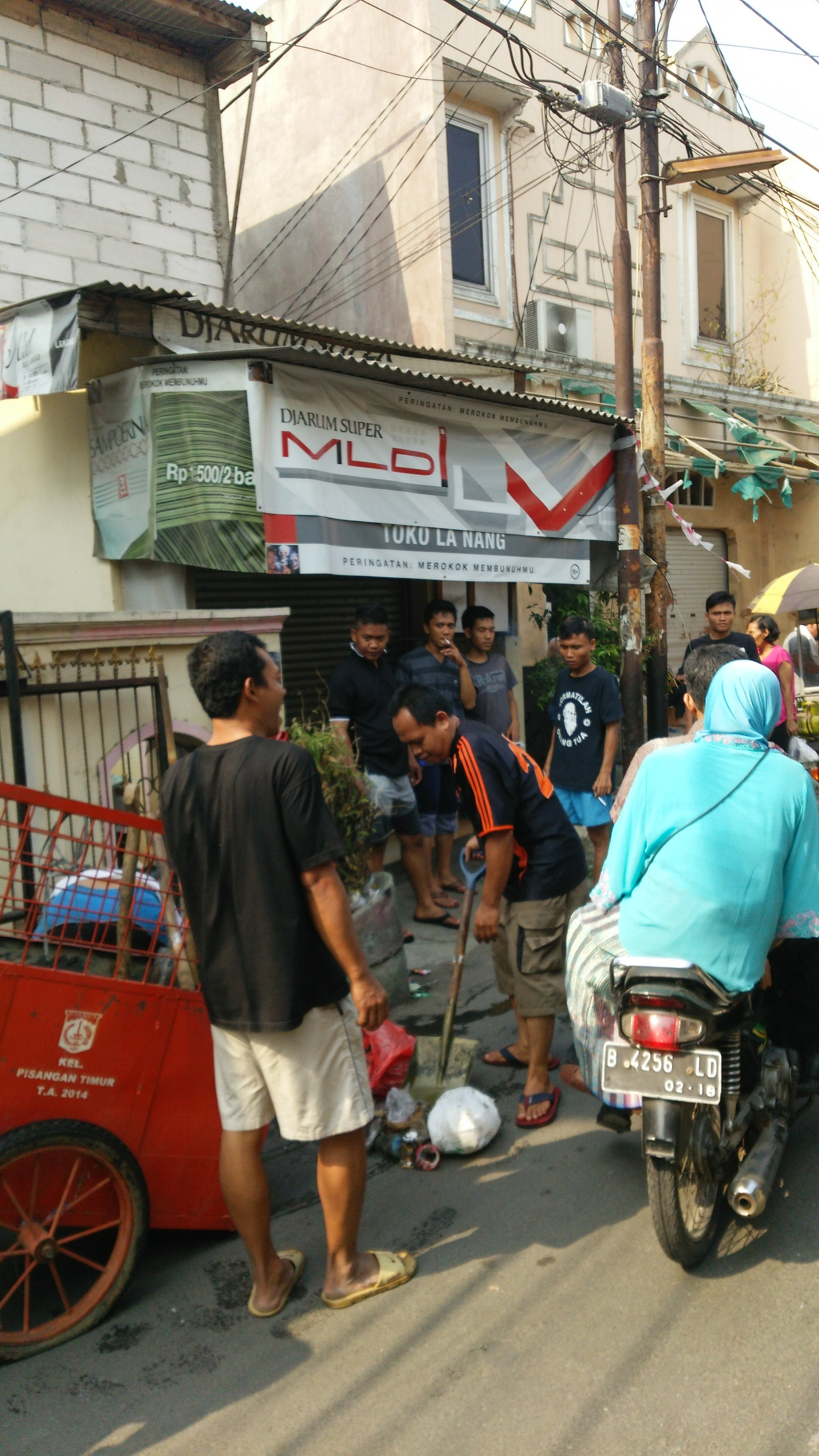
A small shop in Jakarta surrounded by Djarum Super MLD, A Mild, and Sampoerna Hijau advertisements. The city has banned such advertisements on large billboards since 2015, but did not effectively cover those in small shops.

According to the Ministry of Internal Affairs, the Indonesian Health Act (UU No. 36/2009) advices local governments (mostly municipal-level governments) to establish a Local Regulation regarding "no-cigarette" areas. The definition of "no-cigarette" areas is extended not only to places where people are prohibited from smoking, but also to places where it is prohibited to sell or promote cigarette products.

Currently, there have been a number of attempts to prohibit outdoor and/or indoor cigarette advertisements, including billboards, posters, and banners, by local (mostly second-level, city or regency) governments. In January 2015, the provincial government of Jakarta under Basuki Tjahaja Purnama had passed the Governor Regulation No. 1 of 2015, banning cigarette advertisements on all billboards and jumbotrons within the jurisdiction. The ban was also supplemented by Governor Regulation No. 148 of 2017 which passed on 13 October 2017. In 2021, it was repealled and replaced by Governor Regulation No. 100 of 2021, which now covers advertisements on modern convenience store chains like Indomaret and Alfamart, as well as movie theatres. Because of this ban, the organizations Kretek Preservation National Committee (KNPK), Kretek Community (Komtek), Tobacco League, including law practitioners and a group of retailers threatened to contest Anies Baswedan, then-incumbent governor of Jakarta, in the local court.

Bogor city government also outlawed such advertising, effective since 27 May 2015.

== See also ==
- Smoking in Indonesia
