= List of cigarette brands =

This is a list of current cigarette brands. Factory-made cigarettes, when contrasted to roll-your-own cigarettes, are called tailor mades.

== List ==
Brand	Manufacturer	Origin	Released	Reference
286	Merapi Agung Lestari	Indonesia		
305's	Dosal Tobacco	United States		
A Mild (Sampoerna A)	Sampoerna	Indonesia	October 19, 1990; 35 years ago	
Absolute Mild	Karyadibya Mahardika & Japan Tobacco	Indonesia		
Access Mild	Moeria Mulia	Indonesia		
Africaine	Landewyck Tobacco	Luxembourg	1940s	
Akhtamar	Grand Tobacco	Armenia		
Alain Delon	British American Tobacco	Cambodia	1992; 34 years ago	
American Street Premium	Adlon Eurobusiness	Spain		
Apache	Karyadibya Mahardika & Japan Tobacco	Indonesia	2009; 17 years ago	
Ararat	International Masis Tabak	Armenia		
Ardath	British American Tobacco & Bentoel Group	Indonesia	1891; 135 years ago	
Armour	Armour Indonesia Limited	Indonesia		
Aroma	Nojorono Tobacco & Aroma Tobacco International	Indonesia		
Arum Manis	Jaleca tobacco factory	Indonesia		
Ashford	Joh. Wilh. von Eicken GmbH	Germany		
Assos	Papastratos	Greece	1932	
Astro	La Suerte Cigar and Cigarette Factory	Philippines		
Avolution	Sampoerna	Indonesia		
Bahman	Iranian Tobacco Company	Iran		
Basic	Philip Morris International (International); Philip Morris USA (United States only)	United States		
Bastos	Altadis, then Imperial Tobacco	Kingdom of Spain	1830s	
Belinda	British American Tobacco	Netherlands	1940s	
Belomorkanal	Uritsky Tobacco Factory	Soviet Union	1932; 94 years ago	
Belmont	Philip Morris International	Canada	1960s; 65 years ago	
Benson & Hedges	Altria; British American Tobacco (Asia, Australia and New Zealand only); Japan Tobacco International (United Kingdom only); Philip Morris USA (Canada and United States only) Ceylon Tobacco Company (Sri Lanka only)	United Kingdom	1873; 153 years ago	
Bentoel	Bentoel Group	Indonesia	1935; 91 years ago	
Berkeley	ITC Limited	India		
Bidi	Bidi Sejahtera	Indonesia		
Bintang Buana	Bentoel Group	Indonesia		
Black Devil	Heupink & Bloemen	Netherlands		
Black Tip	Grand Tobacco	Armenia		
Blend	Swedish Match AB	Sweden	1971; 55 years ago	
Bohem	KT&G	South Korea	2007	
Bokormas	Bokormas Tobacco	Indonesia		
Bond Street	Philip Morris International	United Kingdom	1902; 124 years ago	
Bonus	La Suerte Cigar and Cigarette Factory	Philippines		
Boss	PMFTC	Philippines		
Bowling Gold	PMFTC	Philippines		
Bristol	ITC Limited (International) Ceylon Tobacco Company (Sri Lanka only)	India; Sri Lanka		
Bringi	Sudan Tobacco	Sudan		
Caballero	British American Tobacco	Netherlands	1940s	
Cabin	Japan Tobacco	Japan		
Cabinet	Reemtsma	East Germany	1972; 54 years ago	
Caines	House of Prince	Denmark	1990; 36 years ago	
Cambridge	Philip Morris USA	United States		
Camel	Japan Tobacco International (International); Imperial Brands (Australia only); R. J. Reynolds (United States only)	United States	1913; 113 years ago	
Canadian Classics	Rothmans, Benson & Hedges	Canada	Mid-90s	
Capri	R. J. Reynolds Tobacco Company	United States	1987; 39 years ago	
Capstan	Imperial Brands; British American Tobacco (Sri Lanka only)	United Kingdom	1894; 132 years ago	
Carpați	Sfântu-Gheorghe Tobacco Factory	Romania	1931-2010	
Carroll's	British American Tobacco	Ireland	1958; 68 years ago	
Casino	Associated Anglo-American Tobacco Corporation	Philippines		
Caster	Japan Tobacco	Japan		
Cavanders	Godfrey Phillips India	India	1775; 251 years ago	
Cedars	Regie Libanaise des Tabacs et Tombacs	Lebanon		
Cendana	Cendana Nusantara	Indonesia		
Champion	PMFTC	Philippines	1969; 57 years ago	
Chancellor	Golden Tobacco Ltd	India		
Charminar	VST Industries	India		
Charms	VST Industries	India		
Che	Landewyck Tobacco	Luxembourg	2000; 26 years ago	
Chesterfield	Philip Morris International (International); PMFTC (Philippines only); Philip Morris USA (United States only)	United States	1896; 130 years ago	
Chief	Manunggal Jaya Tobacco	Indonesia		
Chunghwa	Shanghai Tobacco Group	People's Republic of China	1949; 77 years ago	
Clas Mild	Nojorono Tobacco International	Indonesia	2003; 23 years ago	
Classic	Metasa	Paraguay		
Classic Filter Kings	ITC Limited	India	1979; 47 years ago	
Clavo	Djarum	Indonesia		
Cleopatra	Eastern Tobacco Company	Egypt	1961; 65 years ago	
Club	Gallaher Group	United Kingdom		
Club (German cigarette)	Japan Tobacco	Germany		
Clu13 (Club)	Bentoel Group	Indonesia		
Cohiba	Altadis	Cuba	1987; 39 years ago	
Colt	Philip Morris USA (United States), Imperial Tobacco Finland Oy (a subsidiary of Imperial Tobacco in Finland)	Finland	1964; 62 years ago	
Competidora	Dosal Tobacco	United States		
Cool	NTC Industries Ltd	India		
Cooper	SEKAP	Greece		
Country	Bentoel Group	Indonesia	1994; 32 years ago	
Craven A	Rothmans, Benson & Hedges (International); Carreras Tobacco Company (United Kingdom only)	United Kingdom		
Crossroads		United States		
Crystal	Filasta Indonesia	Indonesia		
Dakota	R. J. Reynolds Tobacco Company	United States	1990; 36 years ago	
Dalila	Česko-Slovenský tabakový priemysel	Slovakia		
Dallas	Associated Anglo-American Tobacco Corporation	Philippines		
Davidoff	Imperial Brands (International)	Switzerland	1926; 100 years ago	
De Reszke	Godfrey Phillips India	United Kingdom, India		
Delima	Djuwed tobacco factory	Indonesia		
Deluxe Tenor	NTC Industries Ltd	India		
Derby	Souza Cruz	Brazil	1993; 33 years ago	
Diana	Philip Morris International	Italy		
Djarum 76	Djarum	Indonesia	1976; 50 years ago	
Djarum Black	Djarum (International)	Indonesia	2001; 25 years ago	
Djarum Coklat	Djarum	Indonesia	1972; 54 years ago	
Djarum Forte	Djarum	Indonesia		
Djarum Super	Djarum	Indonesia	1981; 45 years ago	
Djarum Super MLD	Djarum	Indonesia		
Djarum Super Wave	Djarum	Indonesia		
Djarum Vanilla	Djarum (International)	Indonesia		
Djeruk Kretek	Daun Jeruk tobacco	Indonesia		
Dji Sam Soe 234	Philip Morris International & Sampoerna	Indonesia	1913; 113 years ago	
DJ Mix	D J Tobacco Co. Ltd.	Hong Kong	1999	
Djolali Kretek	Djolali Nusantara	Indonesia		
Dominant	International Masis Tabak	Armenia		
Donskoy Tabak	Donskoy Tabak	Russia	1857; 169 years ago	
Doral	R. J. Reynolds Tobacco Company	United States	1969; 57 years ago	
Double Happiness	Shanghai Tobacco Corporation	People's Republic of China	1906; 120 years ago	
Drina	Sarajevo Tobacco Factory	Socialist Republic of Bosnia and Herzegovina	after World War II	
DTC	Dosal Tobacco	United States		
Du Maurier	Imperial Tobacco Canada; West Indian Tobacco Company (Trinidad and Tobago only)	Canada	1930; 96 years ago	
Ducados	Altadis, a division of Imperial Tobacco	Spain	1963; 63 years ago	
Ducal	Landewyck Tobacco	Luxembourg	1969; 57 years ago	
Duke	ITC Limited	India		
Dunhill	British American Tobacco (International); R. J. Reynolds Tobacco Company (United States only) Ceylon Tobacco Company (Sri Lanka only)	United Kingdom		
Eagle 20's	Liggett Group	United States		
Eclipse	R. J. Reynolds Tobacco Company	United States	1994	
Elita	British American Tobacco	Latvia	1967; 59 years ago	
Elixyr	Landewyck Tobacco	Luxembourg	1998; 28 years ago	
Embassy	Imperial Brands	United Kingdom	1914; 112 years ago	
Envio Mild	Leni Jaya Tobacco	Indonesia		
Equs Bold	KT&G & Mandiri Maha Mulia	Indonesia		
Ernte 23	Reemtsma	Germany	1923; 103 years ago	
Esse	Korea Tobacco & Ginseng Corporation (International)	South Korea		
Eve	Liggett Group (United States only); Philip Morris International (Germany only)	United States	1971; 55 years ago	
Everest	British American Tobacco Zimbabwe Holdings	Zimbabwe		
Excel Bold	Excel	Indonesia		
Export	JTI Macdonald	Canada	1928; 98 years ago	
Extreme Mild	Japan Tobacco & Karyadibya Mahardhika	Indonesia		
f6	Philip Morris International	Germany	1959; 67 years ago	
Fatima	Liggett Group	Turkey		
Fellas Mild	Djarum	Indonesia		
Filter 57	Tobačna Ljubljana (a division of Imperial Tobacco)	Socialist Republic of Slovenia	1957; 69 years ago	
Fix Mild	Tambora Mulyorejo	Indonesia		
Fixation	Merapi Agung Lestari	Indonesia		
Flair	Golden Tobacco Ltd	India		
Flake	ITC Limited	India		
Fortuna	Imperial Brands (International)	Spain	1974; 52 years ago	
Fortune International	PMFTC	Philippines	1995; 31 years ago	
Forum	Forum Cigarettes Indonesia	Indonesia		
Four Square	Godfrey Phillips India	India		
Four Aces	W.D. & H.O. Wills/ Imperial Brands	Sri Lanka	1901; 125 years ago	
FS1	Godfrey Phillips India	India		
Furongwang	Hunan Tobacco Group	People's Republic of China	1951; 75 years ago	
Galan	Wismilak	Indonesia		
Ganas	Ganas Tobacco company	Indonesia		
Garni	Grand Tobacco	Armenia		
Gauloises	Imperial Tobacco	France	1910; 116 years ago	
Geo Mild	Roberta Prima Tobacco	Indonesia		
George Karelias and Sons	Karelia Tobacco Company	Greece		
GG Mild	Gudang Garam	Indonesia		
Gitanes	Imperial Brands	France	1910; 116 years ago	
GL	Utama Mama	Indonesia		
GMB Cigarette	General Management Business	Erbil, Kurdistan	2015; 11 years ago	
Gold Flake	ITC Limited	India		
Golden Bat	Japan Tobacco	Japan	1906; 120 years ago	
Goldfield (Goldprince in Belgium, Claridge in Slovakia)	various European tobacco companies	Germany	1990s	
Grand Prix	Liggett Group	United States		
Greys	Godfrey Phillips India	United Kingdom, India		
GT	Grand Tobacco	Armenia	1997	
Gudang Cengkeh	Gudang Cengkeh	Indonesia		
Gudang Garam	Gudang Garam	Indonesia	June 26, 1958	
Guiyan	Guizhou Tobacco Group	People's Republic of China		
Gunston	British American Tobacco	South Africa	1950s	
HB	British American Tobacco	Germany		
Hero	Sumatra Tobacco Trading Company (STTC)	Indonesia		
Hits Mild	Tobacco Selatmalaka Industry	Indonesia		
Hi-Lite	Japan Tobacco	Japan		
Hollywood	Souza Cruz	Brazil		
Hongtashan	Hongta Tobacco Group	People's Republic of China	1959; 67 years ago	
Hope	Japan Tobacco	Japan	July 1957; 69 years ago	
Hope Luxury	PMFTC	Philippines	October 1975; 50 years ago	
Huanghelou	Hubei Tobacco Group	People's Republic of China		
Huangshan	Anhui Tobacco Group	People's Republic of China		
In Mild	Djarum	Indonesia		
India Kings	ITC Limited	India		
Insignia	ITC Limited	India		
Inspiro	Djarum	Indonesia		
Intro	Manunggal Jaya Tobacco	Indonesia		
Jackpot	PMFTC	Philippines		
Jadran	Adris grupa (British American Tobacco)	Socialist Republic of Croatia		
Jan III Sobieski	British American Tobacco	Poland	March 1994; 32 years ago	
Java	British American Tobacco	Soviet Union	1966; 60 years ago	
Jazy Mild	Nojorono	Indonesia		
Jet	Sumatra Tobacco Trading Company (STTC)	Indonesia		
Jin Ling	Baltic Tobacco Company	Kaliningrad, Russia	1997; 29 years ago	
Joged	Bentoel Group	Indonesia		
John Player (now Superkings)	John Player & Sons/ Imperial Brands (International) Ceylon Tobacco Company (Sri Lanka only)	United Kingdom	1877; 149 years ago	
John Player Gold Leaf	Ceylon Tobacco Company	Sri Lanka	1993; 33 years ago	
John Silver	Japan Tobacco	Sweden	1947; 79 years ago	
Juara	Tri Sakti Purwosari Makmur	Indonesia	2018; 8 years ago	
June	Golden Tobacco Ltd	India		
Juwel	VEB Dresden Zigarettenfabriken	East Germany	1972 - 2015	
Kansas	Bentoel Group	Indonesia	1950; 76 years ago	
Karo	Altria	Germany		
Kencono 89	Sinar Kencana Persada	Indonesia	2005; 21 years ago	
Kensitas Club	Japan Tobacco International	United Kingdom		
Kent	British American Tobacco (International); R. J. Reynolds Tobacco Company (United States)	United States	1952; 74 years ago	
King's	House of Prince	Denmark		
Kingsway	American Express of London/Ardath Tobacco Company, Rothmans International (in Malaysia)	United Kingdom	January 1959; 67 years ago	
Klampok	PR Klampok	Indonesia		
Klobot	PR Sukun	Indonesia		
Klubi	Rettig Group Oy Ab	Finland	1901; 125 years ago	
Kool	British American Tobacco (International); ITG Brands (United States only)	United States	1933; 93 years ago	
Krong Thip	Thailand Tobacco Monopoly	Thailand		
L&M	Philip Morris International (International); PMFTC (Philippines only); Philip Morris USA (United States only)	United States	1953; 73 years ago	
L.A. Ice	Djarum	Indonesia		
Laika	Various Soviet tobacco factories	Soviet Union	1957; 69 years ago Discontinued 1990s	
L.A. Lights	Djarum	Indonesia	1996; 30 years ago	
Lambert & Butler	Imperial Brands (International)	United Kingdom	1834; 192 years ago	
Lark	Altria (International) Philip Morris USA (United States and Ecuador only)	United States	1963; 63 years ago	
LD (Liggett Ducat)	Japan Tobacco International	Russia, Malaysia	1999; 27 years ago	
Legend	Golden Tobacco Ltd	India		
Level	Japan Tobacco	Sweden	2001; 25 years ago	
Lexington	Landewyck Tobacco (British American Tobacco)	Luxembourg	1950; 76 years ago	
Liggett Select	Liggett Group	United States		
Lips	Golden Tobacco Ltd	India		
Liqun	Zhejiang Tobacco Group	People's Republic of China		
Longbeach	Philip Morris International	Australia		
Look	House of Prince	Denmark	1966; 60 years ago	
Lovćen	Duvanski Kombinat Podgorica	Socialist Republic of Montenegro	1960s	
Lucky Strike	British American Tobacco (International); ITC Limited (India only); R. J. Reynolds Tobacco Company (United States) Ceylon Tobacco Company (Sri Lanka only)	United States	1871; 155 years ago	
Lucky 7	Ceylon Tobacco Company	Sri Lanka		
Main	House of Prince	Sweden	2004; 22 years ago	
Madja	PR Madja	Indonesia		
Magnum Filter	Sampoerna	Indonesia		
Magnum Mild	Sampoerna	Indonesia		
Manchester	J.S.S Tobacco Limited	United Arab Emirates		
Manchester	Magnum Asia Limited	Vietnam	2005; 21 years ago	
Mantano	British American Tobacco	Netherlands	1950s	
Marlboro	Philip Morris International (International); PMFTC (Philippines only); Philip Morris USA (United States only)	United States	1924; 102 years ago	
Maraton	Nojorono	Indonesia		
Mark	PMFTC	Philippines		
Mark Adams No. 1	Grand River Enterprises Germany	Germany	1990s	
Maryland	Landewyck Tobacco	Luxembourg	1944; 82 years ago	
Masis	Grand Tobacco	Armenia		
Master Mild	Trisakti Purwosari Makmur	Indonesia		
Matra	Nojorono	Indonesia		
Matterhorn	Ceylon Tobacco Company	Sri Lanka		
Maverick	Imperial Brands (United States only)	United States	1986; 40 years ago	
Max	Lorillard Tobacco Company	United States	1975; 51 years ago	
Maxus	Nojorono	Indonesia		
Mayfair	Japan Tobacco International	United Kingdom	1992; 34 years ago	
MayPole	NTC Industries Ltd	India		
Melbour	Espert S.A. Tabacalera (Imperial Brands)	Argentina	2002; 24 years ago	
Memphis	Gallaher Group	Austria		
Merit	Philip Morris USA	United States		
Mevius	Japan Tobacco International (International); Imperial Brands (Australia)	Japan	1977; 49 years ago	
Midas Filter	Midas	Indonesia		
Mild Formula	Saraswanti Mekar Agung	Indonesia		
Mighty	Mighty Corporation	Philippines		
Minak Djinggo	PT Nojorono Tobacco International, Kudus, Indonesia, under authority of Philip Morris International	Indonesia		
Misty	R. J. Reynolds Tobacco Company	United States	1990; 36 years ago	
Mocne	Imperial Brands	Poland	1950s	
Moments	VST Industries	India		
Mondial	Eastern Tobacco Company	Egypt		
Montego	Liggett Group	United States		
More	R.J. Reynolds Tobacco Company; Japan Tobacco International (EU only); PMFTC (Philippines only)	United States	June 1975; 51 years ago	
MS	British American Tobacco (International)	Italy	1969; 57 years ago	
MT One	Grand Tobacco	Armenia		
Muratti	Philip Morris International; British American Tobacco	Turkey	1821; 205 years ago	
Mustang	Wikatama Indah Sigaret Indonesia	Indonesia		
Nagari Filter	Barito tobacco factory	Indonesia		
Natural American Spirit	Japan Tobacco International (International); R. J. Reynolds Tobacco Company (United States only)	United States	1982; 44 years ago	
Navy Cut	ITC Limited	India		
Naxan	PT. Sejahtera	Indonesia		
neO Mild	Bentoel Group	Indonesia		
Neslite	Merapi Agung Lestari	Indonesia		
Newmore	House of Prince	Sweden	2002; 24 years ago	
Newport	British American Tobacco (International); R. J. Reynolds Tobacco Company (United States)	United States	1957; 69 years ago	
Next	Philip Morris International	Malaysia		
Nikki Super	Nikki Super Tobacco Indonesia	Indonesia		
Niko International	Niko Rama	Indonesia	1994; 32 years ago	
Nil	Gallaher Group	German Empire	1901; 125 years ago	
Niu	Merapi Agung Lestari	Indonesia		
NO.10	NTC Industries Ltd	India		
Noblesse	Dubek	Israel	1952; 74 years ago	
North Pole	Godfrey Phillips India	India		
North State	British American Tobacco	Finland	1931; 95 years ago	
NOY	International Masis Tabak	Armenia	2000	
Nuu Mild	CAMA	Indonesia		
Oasis	Liggett & Myers Tobacco Co.	United States	1950-1966	
Old Gold	R. J. Reynolds Tobacco Company	United States	1926; 100 years ago	
One Mild	Bentoel Group	Indonesia		
Orbit	Menara Kartika Buana	Indonesia		
Ouro Fino	Metasa	Paraguay		
Overstolz	Japan Tobacco International	German Empire	1917; 109 years ago	
Pall Mall	British American Tobacco (International); R. J. Reynolds Tobacco Company (United States) Ceylon Tobacco Company (Sri Lanka)	United Kingdom	1899; 127 years ago	
Paramount	Imperial Tobacco Norway AS	Norway	2006; 20 years ago	
Panama	Golden Tobacco Ltd	India		
Parisienne	British American Tobacco	Switzerland		
Parliament	Philip Morris International (International); Philip Morris USA (United States only)	United States	1931; 95 years ago	
Peace	Japan Tobacco	Japan	1952; 74 years ago	
PEEL	D J Tobacco Co., Ltd.	Hong Kong	1999	
Pensil Mas	TDS Tobacco	Indonesia		
Perilly's	John Perilly (supervised by British American Tobacco)			
Peter Stuyvesant	British American Tobacco (International)	South Africa	1954; 72 years ago	
Philip Morris	Philip Morris International (International); PMFTC (Philippines only); Philip Morris USA (United States only)	United States	1847; 179 years ago	
Philip Morris Bold	Sampoerna	Indonesia	2019; 7 years ago	
Pianissimo Peche	Japan Tobacco	Japan		
PIN	Sampoerna	Indonesia		
Pink Elephant	Heupink & Bloemen	Netherlands		
Platinum	Golden Tobacco Ltd	India		
Play	Japan Tobacco International	Russia		
Players	ITC Limited	India		
Player's Navy Cut	Imperial Brands	Sri Lanka		
Polo Club	Metasa	Paraguay		
Polo Mild	Muria Sigaret Industri	Indonesia		
Popularne	Państwowe Zakłady Przemysłu	Poland		
Potenza	Karya Timur Prima	Indonesia		
Praoe Lajar	Perusahaan Rokok Perahu Layar	Indonesia		
Prima	Kyiv Tobacco Factory, various Russian tobacco manufacturers	Ukraine	since 1970	
Prince	House of Prince; British American Tobacco	Denmark	1957; 69 years ago	
Pueblo	Pöschl Tabak	Germany		
Pundimas	Pundimas Nasional	Indonesia		
Pyramid	Liggett Group	United States	1988; 38 years ago	
R6	Reemtsma (a subsidiary of Imperial Tobacco)	Weimar Republic	1921; 105 years ago	
Raison	KT&G, Mandiri Maha Mulia (Indonesia only)	South Korea	2002; 24 years ago	
Rainbow	Metasa	Paraguay		
Rambler	House of Prince	Denmark		
Rawit	Bentoel Group	Indonesia		
Red & White	Godfrey Phillips India	India		
Red Line	Grand Tobacco	Armenia		
Red Mild	Gudang Baru	Indonesia		
Red Ruby	Big Tobacco	Myanmar		
Regal	Imperial Brands	United Kingdom		
Regent	NTC Industries Ltd	India		
Relax Mild	Transentra Tobacco	Indonesia		
Reval	Reemtsma	Germany		
RHF	Indonesian tobacco company	Indonesia		
RHM Mild	RHM	Indonesia		
Richmond	Imperial Brands	United Kingdom	1999; 27 years ago	
Ritz	Tabaqueira	Brazil	1970; 56 years ago	
Romeo y Julieta	Altadis	Cuba	1999; 27 years ago	
Roth-Händle	Reemtsma	German Empire	1897; 129 years ago	
Rothmans	Philip Morris International; British American Tobacco	United Kingdom		
Royal	ITC Limited	India		
Russky Stil (Русский Стиль)	Japan Tobacco International	Russia		
Saat	AKJ Marketing (Malaysia) Sdn Bhd	Malaysia		
Salem	ITG Brands	United States	1956; 70 years ago	
Sampoerna Hijau	Sampoerna	Indonesia		
Sakura	Japan Tobacco	Japan		
Sam Djok Koe	Sampoerna	Indonesia		
Sax	British American Tobacco	Italy	1961; 65 years ago	
Scissors	ITC Limited	India		
Score Mild	Maju Abadi Sigaret	Indonesia		
Sejati	Bentoel Group	Indonesia		
Senior	Victory Indonesia	Indonesia		
Senior Service	Gallaher Group	United Kingdom	1925; 101 years ago	
Septwolves	Fujian Tobacco Group	People's Republic of China		
Seven Stars	Japan Tobacco	Japan		
SG	Philip Morris International	Portugal	1950s	
Shaan	VST Industries	India		
Shuangxi	Ceylon Tobacco Company (Sri Lanka only) CTBAT (International)	Sri Lanka; Hong Kong		
Silk Cut	Japan Tobacco International (International)	United Kingdom	1964; 62 years ago	
Silver	Metasa	Paraguay		
Site	Indonesian tobacco company	Indonesia		
Slic Mild	Djarum	Indonesia		
Smart	Austria Tabak GmbH	Austria	September 7, 1959; 67 years ago	
Smart	Japan Tobacco	Japan		
Smokin Joes Brand	Smokin Joes Trading Post	United States	1994; 32 years ago	
Sobranie	Japan Tobacco International	Russia, United Kingdom	1879; 147 years ago	
Sportsman	Ceylon Tobacco Company	Sri Lanka; Kenya		
Special Extra Filter	VST Industries	India		
ST Dupont	Philip Morris International	France		
Star Mild	Bentoel Group	Indonesia	1996; 30 years ago	
State Express 555	British American Tobacco (International) Ceylon Tobacco Company (Sri Lanka only)	United Kingdom	1896; 130 years ago	
Sterling	Japan Tobacco International	United Kingdom	2006; 20 years ago	
Stork	PMFTC	Philippines		
Strand	W.D. & H.O. Wills	United States	1959; 67 years ago	
Style	Golden Tobacco Ltd	India		
Ouro Fino	Metasa	Paraguay		
Sukun	PR Sukun Mc Wartono	Indonesia		
Superkings	Imperial Brands	United Kingdom		
Surya 16	Gudang Garam	Indonesia		
Surya Pro Mild	Gudang Garam	Indonesia		
Sweet Afton	British American Tobacco	Ireland	1919; 107 years ago	
Taj Chhap Deluxe	Golden Tobacco Ltd	India		
Tali Jagat	Bentoel Group	Indonesia		
Tanjung	Indonesian tobacco company	Indonesia		
Tareyton	American Tobacco Company	United States	1954; 72 years ago	
TAWANG	RAJAA TUNGGAL	Indonesia		
Ten Mild	MTI	Indonesia		
Thang Long	Thang Long Tobacco Factory	Vietnam		
The One	Grand Tobacco	Armenia		
The Trost	Herbidus Formulations	India	2021; 5 years ago	
Three Roses	Imperial Brands	Sri Lanka	1980; 46 years ago	
Time	Dubek	Israel		
Tipper	Godfrey Phillips India	India		
Troy	Indonesian tobacco company	Indonesia		
True	R. J. Reynolds Tobacco Company	United States		
Työmies	Tupakkatehdas Fennia	Finland	1902; 124 years ago	
U Mild	Sampoerna	Indonesia	2005; 21 years ago	
Ultra Special	PTHI	Indonesia		
Uno Mild	Bentoel Group	Indonesia		
Up Mild	Pura Perkasa Jaya	Indonesia		
Urban Mild	Armando	Indonesia		
USA	Liggett Group	United States		
USA Gold	ITG Brands	United States		
Vantage	R. J. Reynolds Tobacco Company	United States		
Vegas Mild	Sampoerna	Indonesia		
Vogue	British American Tobacco	United Kingdom; France	1955; 71 years ago	
Viceroy	British American Tobacco, Ceylon Tobacco Company (Sri Lanka only)	United States	1936; 90 years ago	
Vila Rica	R.J. Reynolds Tobacco Company	Brazil	1960s	
Virginia Slims	Altria	United States	1968; 58 years ago	
VIP Blue	Grand Tobacco	Armenia		
Viper	Merca Pantura	Indonesia		
VLN (Very Low Nicotine)	22nd Century Group	United States	2022; 4 years ago	
Walter Wolf	British American Tobacco (former Tvornica Duhana Rovinj)	Croatia		
West	Imperial Brands (International)	Germany	1981; 45 years ago	
Wills Navy Cut	ITC Limited	India	1965; 61 years ago	
Winfield	British American Tobacco (International)	Australia	1972; 54 years ago	
Win Mild	Karya Dibya Mahardika	Indonesia		
Wings	Japan Tobacco, British American Tobacco (European Union only)	United States	1929; 97 years ago	
Winnsboro	Associated Anglo-American Tobacco Corporation	Philippines		
Winston	Japan Tobacco International (International); PMFTC (Philippines only); ITG Brands (United States only)	United States	1954; 72 years ago	
Wismilak	Wismilak	Indonesia		
Woodbine	Imperial Brands	United Kingdom	1888; 138 years ago	
Woodland Craft Cigarettes	Smokey Treats	South Africa	2015; 11 years ago	
X Mild	Bentoel Group	Indonesia	January 2004; 22 years ago	
Yesmoke	Yesmoke	Italy	2007; 19 years ago	
Yuxi	Hongta Tobacco Group	China		
Zenfi	Perusahaan Rokok Zenfi	Indonesia		
Ziganov		Russia		
Zhongnanhai	Beijing Tobacco Corporation	China		

== See also ==
- List of cigar brands
