= Juwel (cigarette) =

German cigarette brand

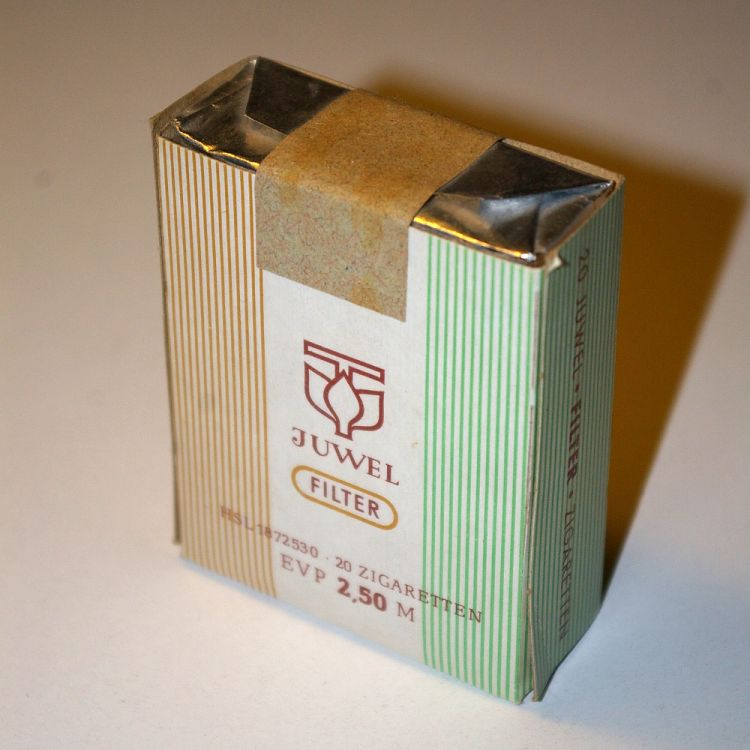
- Product type: Cigarette
- Current owner: Altria
- Produced by: Philip Morris International
- Country: East Germany
- Discontinued: 2016; 10 years ago
- Markets: East Germany, Germany
- Previous owners: "VEB Zigarettenfabriken Dresden"

Juwel was an East German brand of cigarettes owned by Altria and manufactured by Philip Morris International.

== History ==
Juwel cigarettes were produced by VEB Dresden Zigarettenfabriken. To keep costs down, the cigarettes were sold in cardboard packaging and had a shorter filter compared to other filter cigarettes offered in East Germany. With a single retail sale price throughout the GDR (EPP), the cigarette cost 2.50 East German marks for a box of 20 cigarettes, making Juwel one of the cheapest filter cigarettes available in the GDR.

From 1972, another type of cigarette was available for the same price under the name Juwel 72, in parallel with the "Juwel" brand. This brand was not made in the GDR but rather the People's Republic of Bulgaria. Jewel 72 cigarettes had the length of a standard cigarette and were sold in a cellophane packaging. The cigarette was imported by Bulgartabac and did not correspond to the taste of many smokers in the GDR. The GDR Juwel, popularly now called "Old Jewel", "Short Jewel", or simply "Old", was from then on more difficult to obtain.

After 1990, the brand was initially produced by Vereinigte Zigarettenfabriken Dresden GmbH, a subsidiary of Philip Morris International. In 1998 the company was renamed f6 Cigarettenfabrik Dresden GmbH. In addition to the Juwel and Juwel 72 cigarettes, the product range also included the former DDR brands f6 and KARO. Even after 1990, these brands were sold almost exclusively in East Germany.

In the years 2015 and 2016, the Juwel cigarettes were taken off the market.

== See also ==
- Cigarette
- List of cigarette brands
- Tobacco smoking
