= Mantano =

Dutch cigarette brand

- Product type: Cigarette
- Produced by: British American Tobacco
- Country: Netherlands
- Introduced: 1950s
- Markets: Netherlands

Mantano is a Dutch brand of unfiltered cigarettes, currently owned and manufactured by British American Tobacco.

== History ==
Mantano was created after World War II and were especially popular in the 1960s and 1970s. Over time, the popularity of Mantano started to decrease because of increasing taxes on cigarettes, pushing Dutch smokers to buy cheaper (foreign) brands such as Elixyr and Look Out. However, it is still one of the most known Dutch cigarette brands but is now mainly sold in specialised tobacco shops unlike Caballero and Belinda who are also still sold regularly in gas stations and supermarkets.

The cigarettes are made in packs of 25 and are unfiltered, similar to Caballero cigarettes, but a 25-pack filtered version also exists. The Dutch artist Frans Mettes created various posters and adverts from the 1960s up to the 1980s, when tobacco advertising became more strict. A few radio jingles have also been created during the 1970s.

== Products ==
Pack of Mantano cigarettes

- Mantano Unfiltered Cigarettes
- Mantano Filter Cigarettes

Below are all the current brands of Mantano cigarettes sold, with the levels of tar, nicotine and carbon monoxide included.

Pack	Tar	Nicotine	Carbon monoxide
Mantano Unfiltered Cigarettes	10 mg	0,8 mg	10 mg
Mantano Filter Cigarettes	7 mg	0,8 mg	10 mg

== Discontinued ==
As of 2017 all sales off the Mantano brand were cancelled. Reason being the declining sales off the brand caused mostly by the steep prices compared to more mainstream brands.

== See also ==
- Tobacco smoking
- Caballero (cigarette)
- Belinda (cigarette)
