= Reval (disambiguation) =

Reval is the historical name of Tallinn, the capital of Estonia.

Reval may also refer to:

General

- Reval (company), an American cloud computing provider
- Reval (cigarette), a German brand
- SS Reval (later known as SS Memel), a cargo ship, 1925–1977
- Estonian Regiment "Reval", a military formation of the Waffen-SS, 1944–1945

People

- Allan Reval (1913–2005), Australian rules footballer
- Else Reval (1893–1978), German film actress
- Gabrielle Réval (1869–1938), French novelist, essayist

== See also ==
- Revala (9th–13th century), a medieval Estonian county
- Bishopric of Reval (1240–1560), in the Duchy of Estonia, in the Kingdom of Denmark
- Governorate of Reval (1721–1917, later known as Governorate of Estonia), in Russian Empire
- Kreis Reval (also known as Kreis Harrien), in Governorate of Estonia, Russian Empire
- Battle of Reval (1602), during the Polish–Swedish War (1600–1611)
- Siege of Reval (1710), during the Great Northern War (1700–1721)
- Battle of Reval (1790), during the Russo-Swedish War (1788–1790)
