= Super King =

Super King may refer to:

- Beechcraft Super King Air, aircraft
- Chennai Super Kings, a cricket team in the Indian Premier League
- Texas Super Kings, a cricket team in Major League Cricket, affiliated with Chennai Super Kings
- A Futurama character (actually Bender), see Less Than Hero
- Monster chess, a chess variant
- Superkings cigarettes
- A bed size
- Super Kings toys, see Matchbox (brand)
