= Saat =

Saat may refer to:

- Beren Saat (born 1984), Turkish actress
- Joosep Saat (1900–1977), Estonian politician, journalist and academic
- Mari Saat (born 1947), Estonian writer
- Othman Saat (1927–2007), Malaysian politician
- Theo Saat (1928–2015), Dutch sprinter
- Saat (cigarette)
