= Karo (cigarette) =

German filterless cigarette brand

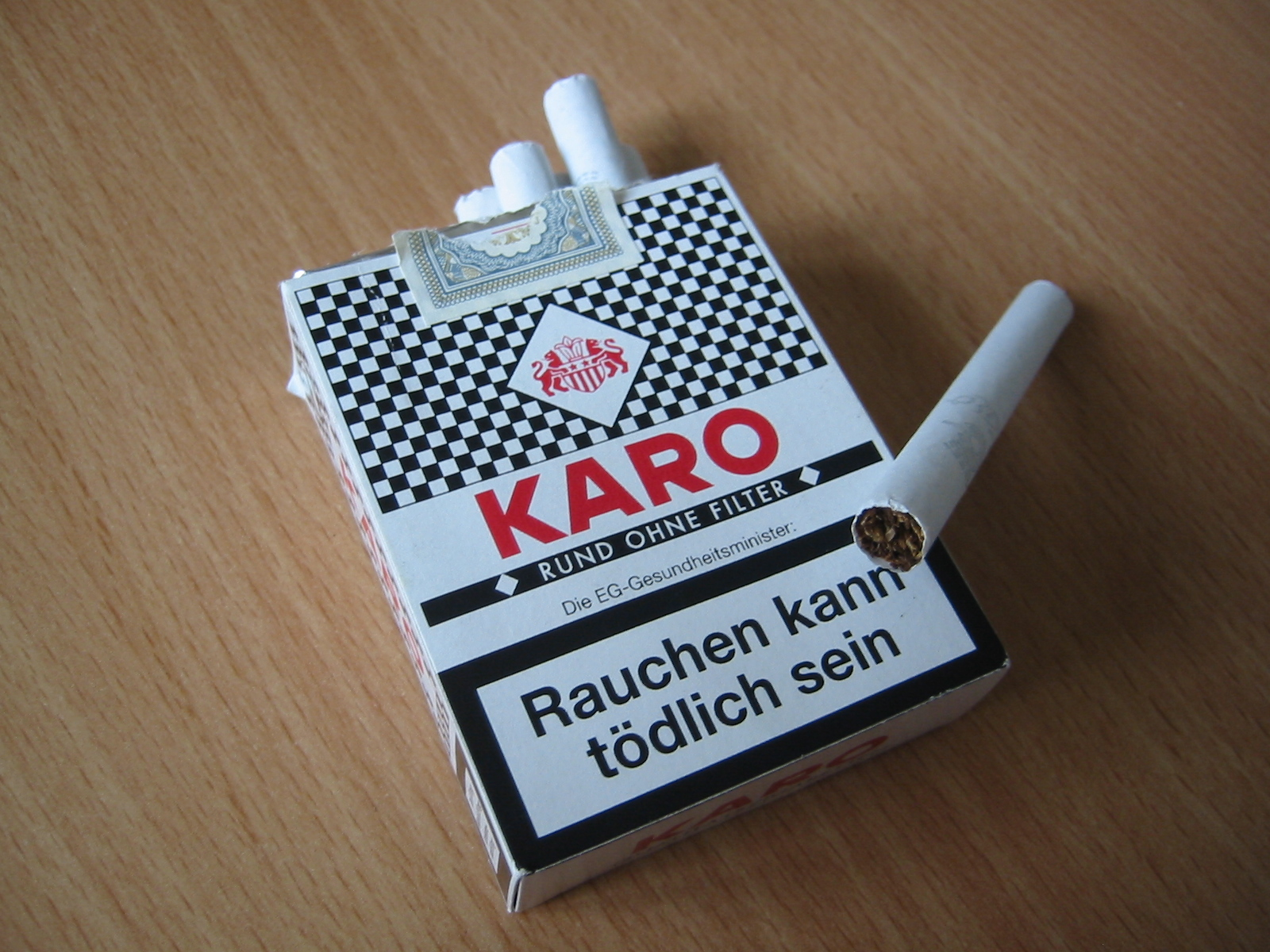
- Pack of Karo cigarettes with a text warning
- Product type: Cigarette
- Current owner: Altria
- Produced by: Altria
- Country: East Germany
- Introduced: Early 1960s as Carré
- Discontinued: 2022
- Markets: Germany
- Previous owners: VEB Zigarettenfabriken Dresden

Karo (official spelling: KARO) was a German brand of filterless cigarettes, owned and manufactured by Altria (previously by Philip Morris International). Karo is the German word for "diamond" (a suit of cards).

== History ==
Karo was originally launched as Carré in the early 1960s but was later "Germanized" into "Karo".

Karo cigarettes were formerly produced in East Germany by the VEB Zigarettenfabriken Dresden, and because they were produced in the German Democratic Republic, the cigarette was made only from tobacco without added perfumes, fragrances, or flavor enhancers.

A pack of filterless Karo cigarettes sold for 1.60 Mark per box of 20 cigarettes, which made it one of the cheapest cigarettes on the Eastern market.

In East Germany, the cigarettes had been nicknamed "Lungentorpedo" ("lung torpedo") on the basis of their unique and strong taste. The cigarette was widespread in East Germany, especially among prison inmates. In West Germany however, the brand was hardly sold because it was difficult to obtain.

After the German reunification, the brand was advertised with the slogan that it was an "attack on the taste of the unification". In 2022 production of Karo ceased.

== In popular culture ==
Wolfgang Lippert sang it in 1982 in his hit Erna kommt ("Erna comes"), with Hugo Egon Balder's western cover version simply changing the words "a Karo" to "cigarette". The brand was also smoked by Jürgen Wolff from "Folkländer" and Bernd Stamm from "Polkatoffel". The brand was especially popular in the East German folk music scene.. The brand is referenced in the fictional book, Denied Access: A Mitch Raap Novel, by author Don Bentley.

== See also ==
- Tobacco smoking
- Caballero (cigarette)
- Mantano (cigarette)
