= Roth-Händle =

German cigarette manufacturer

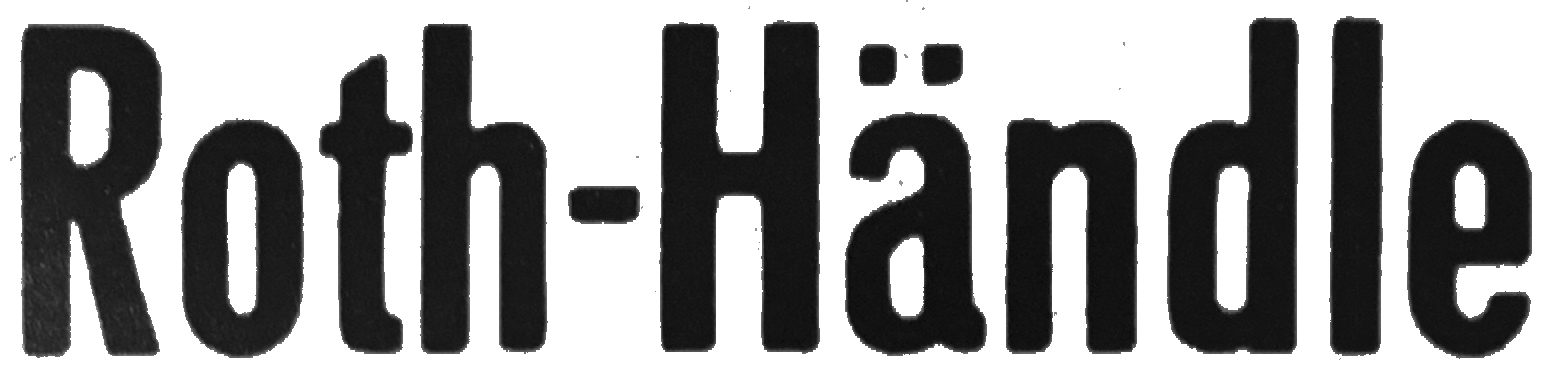
- Type: Private
- Industry: Tobacco
- Founded: 22 July 1897
- Defunct: 1985; 41 years ago
- Fate: Acquired by Reemtsma in 1985, currently a brand
- Headquarters: Germany
- Products: Cigarettes
- Owner: Imperial Brands
- Parent: Reemtsma

Roth-Händle was a cigarette manufacturer based in Lahr, Germany. Its name survives as a brand belonging to Reemtsma, a subsidiary of Imperial Tobacco.

== History ==
The Roth-Händle company started trading in 1897 and registered the name as a trade mark on 22 July of that year.

For many years Roth-Händle cigarettes had a reputation for being very strong, but today are much milder to conform with European Union legislation regarding maximum levels of toxic substances.

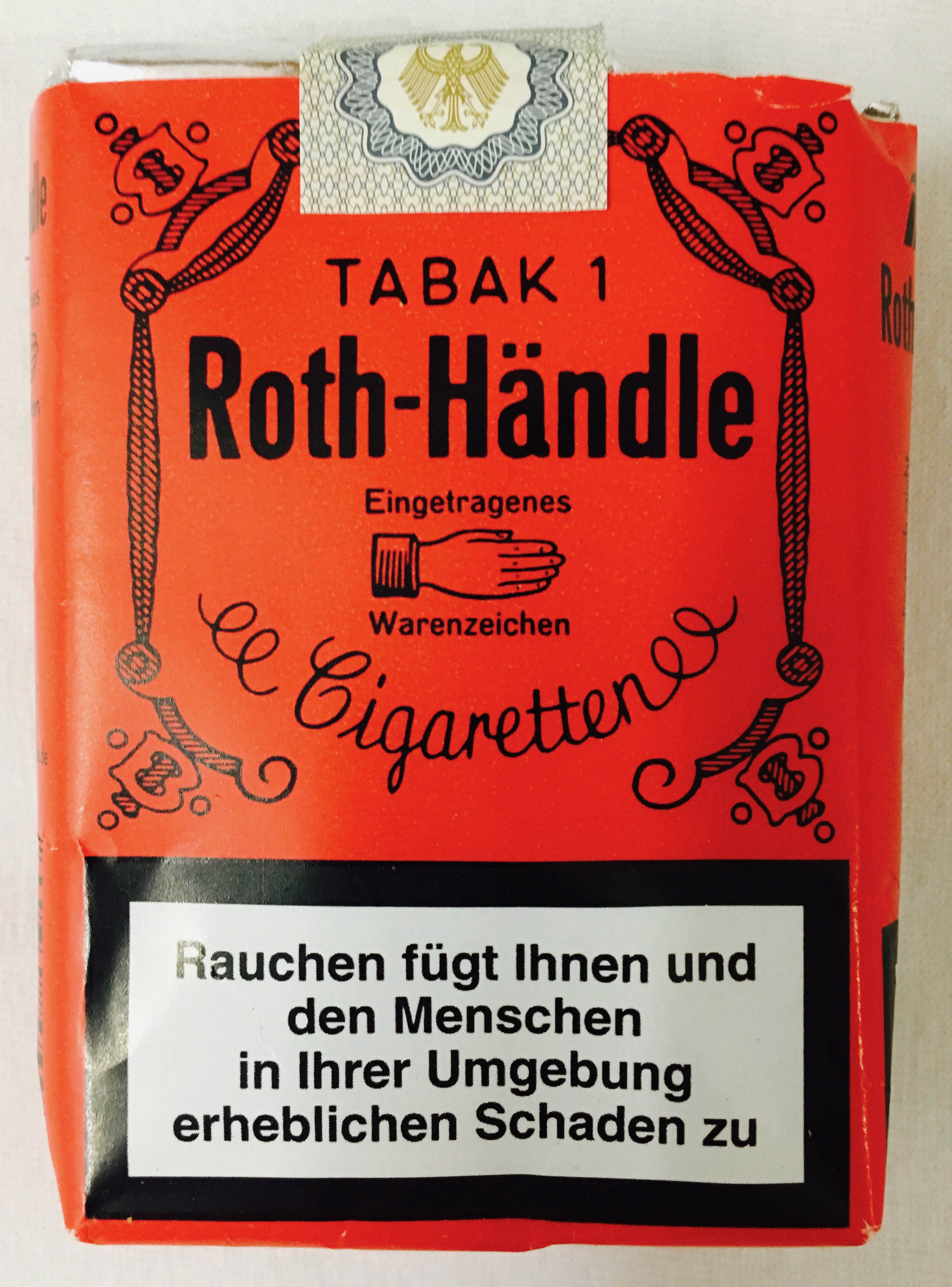
Roth-Handle cigarette pack

Roth-Händle cigarettes use a high proportion of domestically produced dark tobacco and fewer flavour additives than many other brands. They were marketed for many years as "all natural".

Their best-known product is filterless cigarettes. A filter variant was also produced until 2017. Roth-Händle packaging is distinctive, using a soft pack in plain red with 19th century artwork and typefaces in black (or white in the filter variant). Schwarze Hand, a fine cut loose tobacco for hand rolling, is also produced.

In 1991 European Commission legislation set maximum permissible levels of toxins in cigarettes. This affected 'full-strength' products from Reemtsma including Roth-Händle, Reval, "West Strong" and "Astor". From 1993 a maximum of 15 milligrams of tar per cigarette was permitted, further reduced to 12 milligrams in 1998.

In 1998 Roth-Händle introduced a blonde variant, similar to Gitanes Blondes, but this met with little commercial success and was eventually discontinued.

== Company ==
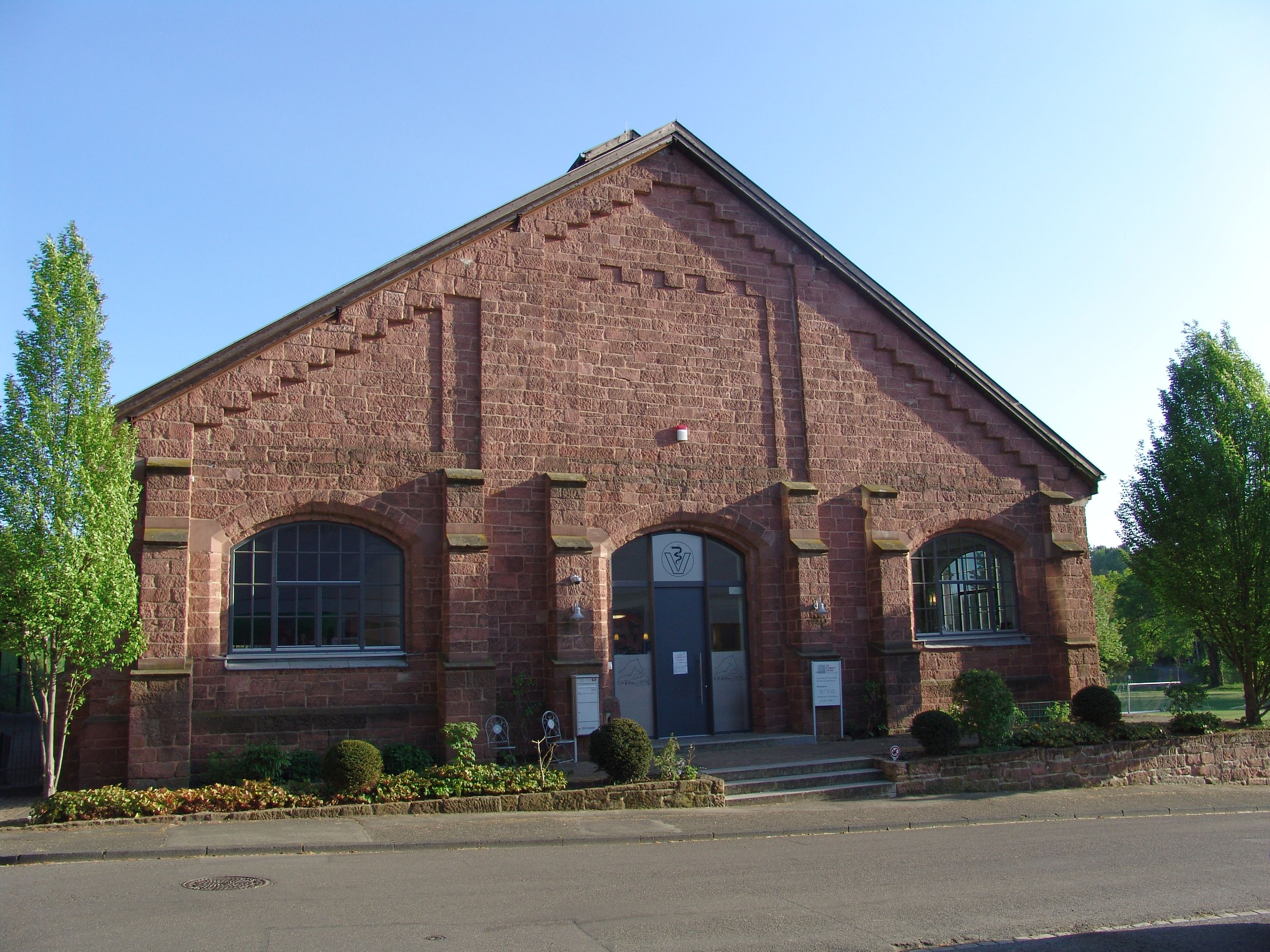
former Roth-Händle building pictured in 2020

The Badische Tabakmanufaktur (Baden Tobacco Manufacturer) was founded in Strasbourg in 1871 by Jules Schaller. In 1920, after 50 years of production, the factory was relocated to Lahr. By the end of the 1930s the Adler and Oppenheimer families, owners of a leather company in their names, owned one third of the shares of what had been renamed Roth-Händle AG, now a public company. Its stock capitalization was then just under 2 million Reichsmarks. With the active participation of the Deutsche Bank, Jewish owners of companies were expropriated due to the Nazi Party's policy of aryanizing all German companies. The Nazis had divided opinions on tobacco consumption: they strengthened protection of non-smokers, but saw tobacco as essential to war-time morale. Propaganda minister Goebbels pleaded that addressing the "tobacco issue" should wait until the war's end. The cigarette manufacturer Johann Neusch from Herbolzheim bought 80% of the shares. A short time after, Roth-Händle AG acquired the previously Jewish owned Alsace Tobacco Manufacturer in Strasbourg.

In 1957 Reemtsma became the majority shareholder and in 1985 took complete ownership. The plant in Lahr was closed in March 2007. It was one of the largest purchasers of tobacco leaves in South Baden and specialised in rolling tobacco as production of Roth Händle cigarettes had much earlier been relocated to other Reemstma plants in Germany including Langenhagen and Wilmersdorf.

== Markets ==
Roth-Händle is mainly sold in Germany, but also in France, Italy, Hungary and the United States.

== Products ==
- Roth-Händle Filterless
- Roth-Händle Blond

Below are all the current brands of Roth-Händle cigarettes sold, with the levels of tar, nicotine and carbon monoxide included.

Pack	Tar	Nicotine	Carbon monoxide
Roth-Händle Filterless	10 mg	1.0 mg	6 mg

== See also ==
- Tobacco smoking
