= Caines (cigarette) =

Danish cigarette brand

- Product type: Cigarette
- Current owner: British American Tobacco
- Produced by: House of Prince
- Country: Denmark
- Introduced: 1990; 36 years ago
- Markets: Denmark, Latvia, Lithuania

Caines is a Danish brand of cigarettes, currently owned and manufactured by House of Prince, a subsidiary of British American Tobacco. When the factory closed its doors in 2011, British American Tobacco Polska S.A. took over the manufacturing duty and began production of the brand in Latvia., however, the brand is currently produced in Poland.

== History ==
Caines was founded in 1990 during the reconstruction of the Scandinavian Tobacco Group, and are still sold today.

The brand is sold in Denmark, Latvia and Lithuania, but was also sold in Norway, Sweden, Estonia, Czech Republic and Greece.

== See also ==
- Tobacco smoking
