= Newmore (cigarette) =

Swedish cigarette brand

- Product type: Cigarette
- Current owner: British American Tobacco
- Produced by: House of Prince
- Country: Sweden
- Introduced: 2002; 24 years ago
- Markets: Sweden, Denmark

Newmore is a brand of cigarette manufactured by House of Prince, a subsidiary of British American Tobacco.

== History ==
Newmore cigarettes were first introduced in 2002. A brand variant called Newmore International ("Newmore White") followed in 2003. Four more variants have appeared since. Newmore cigarettes are 84 mm(3.31 inches) long and are claimed to contain an American blend of tobaccos. The Newmore logo features a fox.

== See also ==
- Tobacco smoking
