= Bentoel Group =

Indonesian tobacco company

PT Bentoel Internasional Investama
- Current logo since 2020
- Formerly: Rimba Niaga Idola (1987–1996); Transindo Multi Prima (1996–2000)
- Type: Subsidiary
- Industry: Tobacco
- Predecessors: Perusahaan Rokok Tjap Bentoel; PT BAT Indonesia Tbk
- Founded: 10 September 1930; 95 years ago (Bentoel); 1917; 109 years ago (British American Tobacco Indonesia)
- Founder: Ong Hok Liong
- Headquarters: Malang, Indonesia (corporate headquarters); Jakarta, Indonesia (operational headquarters)
- Key people: Faisal Raif (president director)
- Products: Cigarettes; Kretek
- Revenue: ▼ Rp 20.835 trillion (2019)
- Net income: ▲ Rp 51 billion (2019)
- Total assets: ▲ Rp 17 trillion (2019)
- Total equity: ▼ Rp 8.402 trillion (2019)
- Number of employees: ▼4,346 (2019)
- Parent: British American Tobacco
- Website: www.bentoelgroup.com

PT Bentoel Internasional Investama, commonly known as Bentoel Group, is an Indonesian tobacco company. It is the second-oldest tobacco company in Indonesia and the fourth-largest in terms of market share, following Sampoerna, Gudang Garam, and Djarum. In 2009, London-based British American Tobacco (BAT), the world's second-largest tobacco company, acquired a 99.74% stake in Bentoel. In early 2010, the company merged with PT BAT Indonesia Tbk, with Bentoel continuing to operate as the surviving entity. However, Bentoel has since revived the BAT Indonesia name.

Headquartered in Jakarta, with its manufacturing plant located in Malang, the company produces local brands such as Bentoel Biru, Bentoel SJT, Ardath, and Tali Jagat. It also manufactures international brands like Lucky Strike, and Dunhill.

== History ==
Logo of Bentoel Group from 2011 to 2020

Ong Hok Liong (born 12 August 1893) initially worked in his father's tobacco trading company in Bojonegoro, East Java. However, his gambling habits prompted his wife to move the family, first to Sumberwaras and later to Malang. In 1920, Ong started a kretek company with his brothers, funding his share by pawning his wife's jewelry. Although he introduced numerous brands, most of them failed.

In 1935, while developing a new brand called Djeruk Manis (Sweet Orange), Ong visited the sacred Gunung Kawi mountain and had a dream about a bentoel (cassava root) vendor. Inspired by the dream, he renamed the brand Bentoel, which became a success. By 1950, Ong employed around 3,000 workers and acquired a cigarette factory in Blitar.

Due to heavy smoking and drinking arak (rice alcohol) to ease the throat pain, Ong died in 1967 from chronic liver disease. In 1968, labor problems led Bentoel to pioneer the use of fully automated rolling machines, a first in the kretek industry.

By the late 1970s, Bentoel was ranked third in Indonesian cigarette production and dominated the machine-made kretek sector. However, in 1979, a government decree restricted the production of machine-made kretek, which negatively impacted the company's performance.

Although Bentoel received significant foreign investment, its financial situation worsened. By the late 1990s, the company faced debts amounting to several hundred million dollars, leading to the resignation of its chief executive, one of Ong's sons.

In 1987, Rajawali Corpora acquired a majority stake in the company and replaced its management and directors. In June 2009, British American Tobacco (BAT) purchased an 85% stake in PT Bentoel Internasional Investama for $494 million and acquired the remaining public shares by the end of August 2009.

== 1987 lawsuit ==
In 1987, lawyer Robert Odjahan Tambunan filed a class-action lawsuit on behalf of Indonesian youth against Bentoel, alleging that the company had violated the law by using the words Remaja Jaya (Successful Youth) as a brand name. The Central Jakarta District Court dismissed the Rp 1 trillion lawsuit, ruling that Tambunan had no legal standing to represent Indonesian youth.

Tambunan argued that the nicotine product could harm Indonesian children and ultimately lead to the nation's decline. The lawsuit also targeted the Jakarta city administration, the Justice Ministry's patent and copyright directorate, and Prambors radio station.

== Business ==
In 2016, Bentoel Internasional was the fourth-largest cigarette producer in Indonesia, with a market share of approximately 7%. The company produced machine-made kretek, hand-rolled kretek, and white cigarettes.
