= Look (cigarette) =

Danish cigarette brand

- Product type: Cigarette
- Current owner: British American Tobacco
- Produced by: House of Prince
- Country: Denmark
- Introduced: 1966; 60 years ago
- Markets: Denmark, Sweden, Germany

Look is a Danish brand of cigarettes, currently owned and manufactured by House of Prince, a subsidiary of British American Tobacco.

== History ==
Look was introduced in 1966 by the Scandinavian Tobacco Group. In 1990, when a big re-organisation was happening at the Scandinavian Tobacco Group, all the manufacturing of the cigarette brands was moved to the sister company House of Prince, which in turn got bought by British American Tobacco in 2008 and now is the main producer of the brand. The tobacco used in Look cigarette consists of an American blend.

The brand is mainly sold in Denmark, but was or still is sold in Sweden and Germany.

The brand is available in four different versions and all of the variants are 100 mm long. Look Original is also known as Look Red.

== Products ==
- Look Menthol (Now called Prince Menthol Boost)

Below are all the current brands of Look cigarettes sold, with the levels of tar, nicotine and carbon monoxide included.

Pack	Tar	Nicotine	Carbon monoxide
Look Original	10 mg	0,9 mg	10 mg
Look Gold	8 mg	0,7 mg	8 mg
Look Silver	6 mg	0,6 mg	6 mg
Look Menthol	10 mg	0,9 mg	10 mg

== See also ==
- Tobacco smoking
- Health Effects of Cigarette Smoking
