= Main (cigarette) =

Brand of cigarettes

- Product type: Cigarette
- Current owner: British American Tobacco
- Produced by: House of Prince
- Country: Sweden
- Introduced: 2004; 22 years ago
- Markets: Europe

Main is a brand of cigarettes, currently owned by British American Tobacco and manufactured by its Danish subsidiary, House of Prince.

== History ==
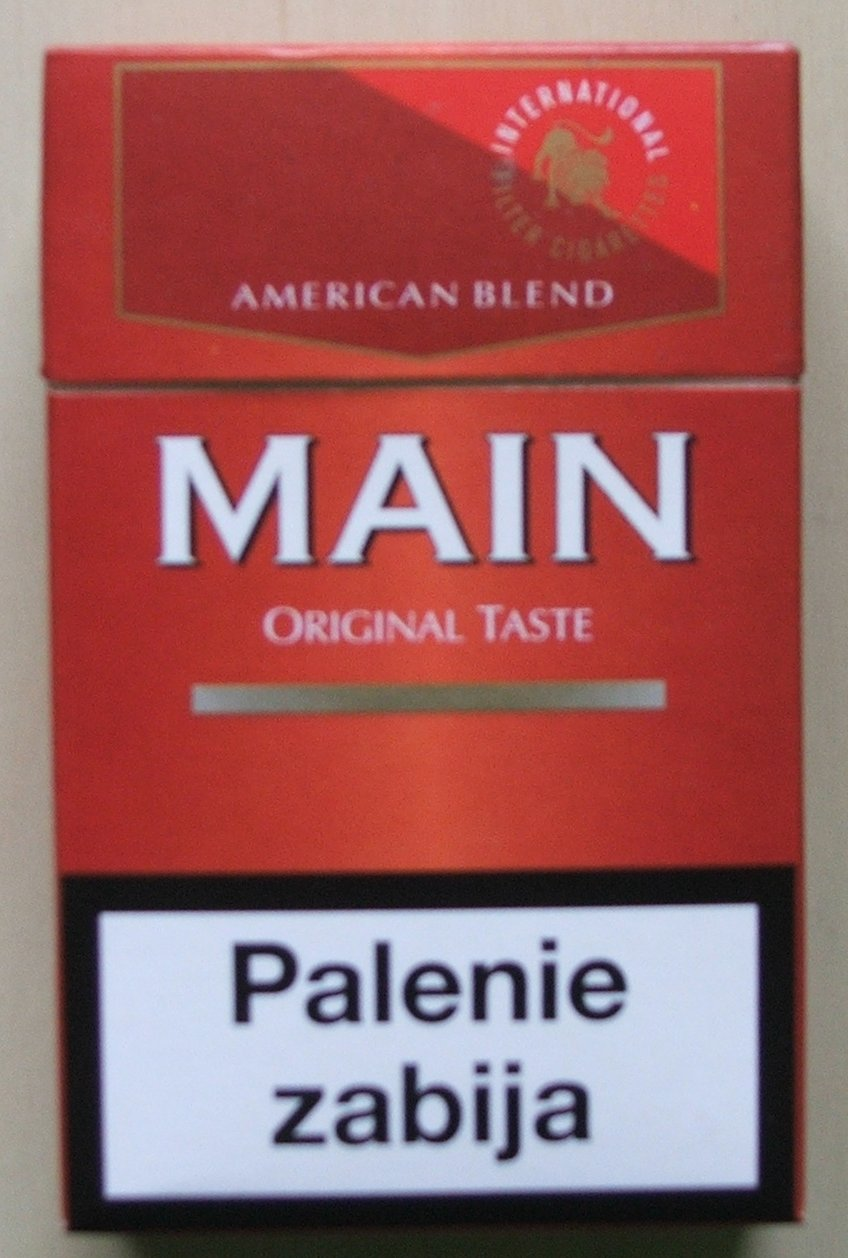
Polish pack of Main cigarettes

Main was launched in 2004 and is a cigarette with a so-called Action Filter, providing a greater filtration of smoke than ordinary cigarette filters. Such a filter does not cause the cigarette smoke to become less dangerous, but according to the manufacturer, it provides a "different smoking experience". The cigarette is 9.3 cm long. The tobacco mixture used in Main consists of an American blend.

The brand is mainly sold in Sweden, but was or still is sold in Austria, Poland, Hungary, Czech Republic, Slovakia, Latvia and Lithuania.

== See also ==
- Tobacco smoking
