= F6 (cigarette) =

German cigarette brand

f6
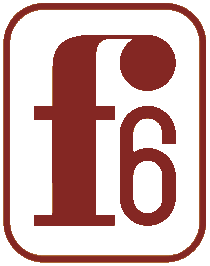

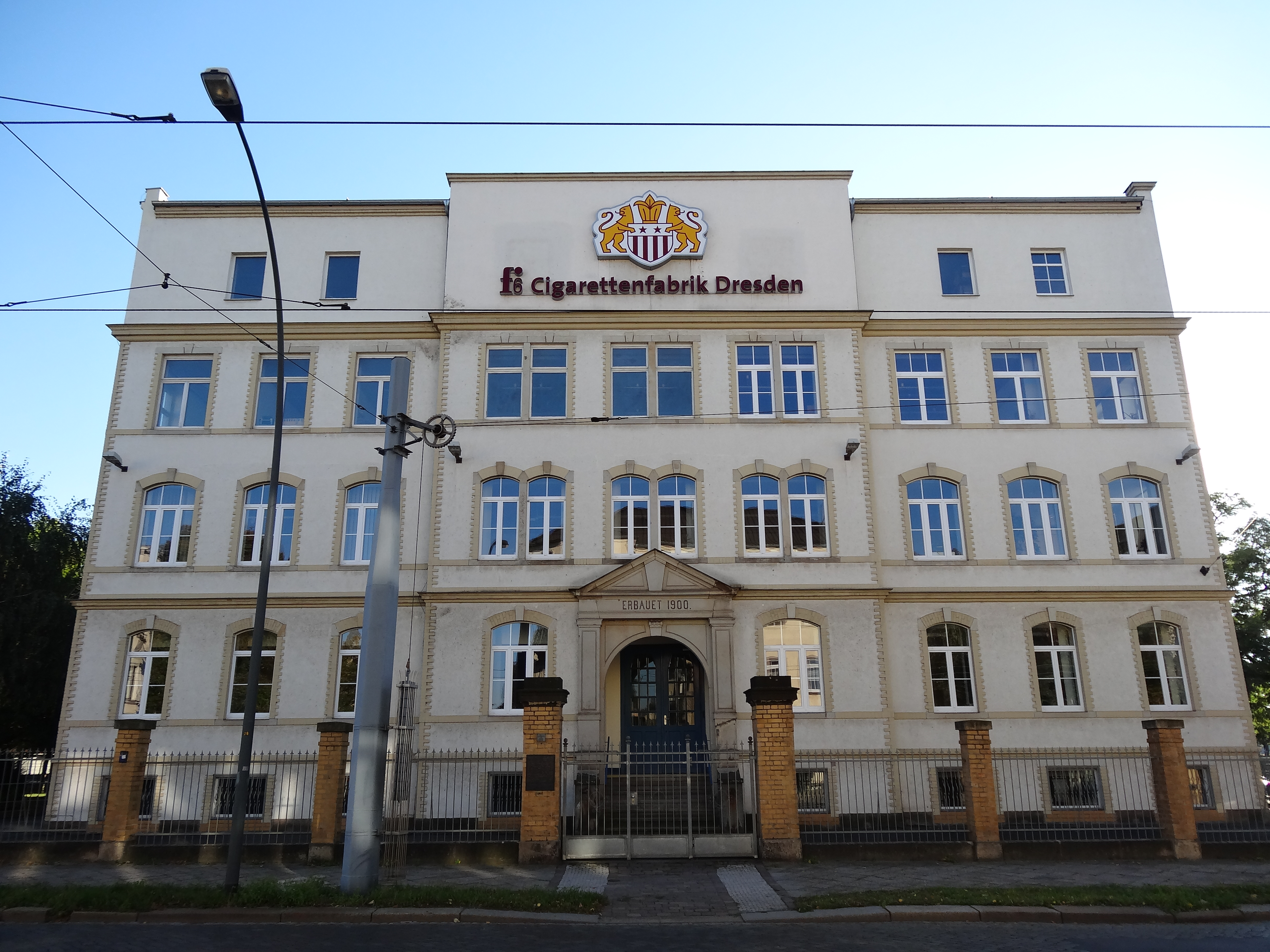
- Cigarette factory in Dresden
- Product type: Cigarette
- Current owner: Philip Morris International
- Produced by: 'f6 Cigarettenfabrik Dresden GmbH"
- Country: East Germany
- Introduced: 1959; 67 years ago
- Markets: East Germany, Germany, Luxembourg
- Previous owners: VEB Dresdner Zigarettenfabriken

f6 (German pronunciation: [ʔɛf ˈzɛks]) is a German cigarette brand owned by Philip Morris International and produced by the f6 Cigarettenfabrik Dresden GmbH.

== History ==
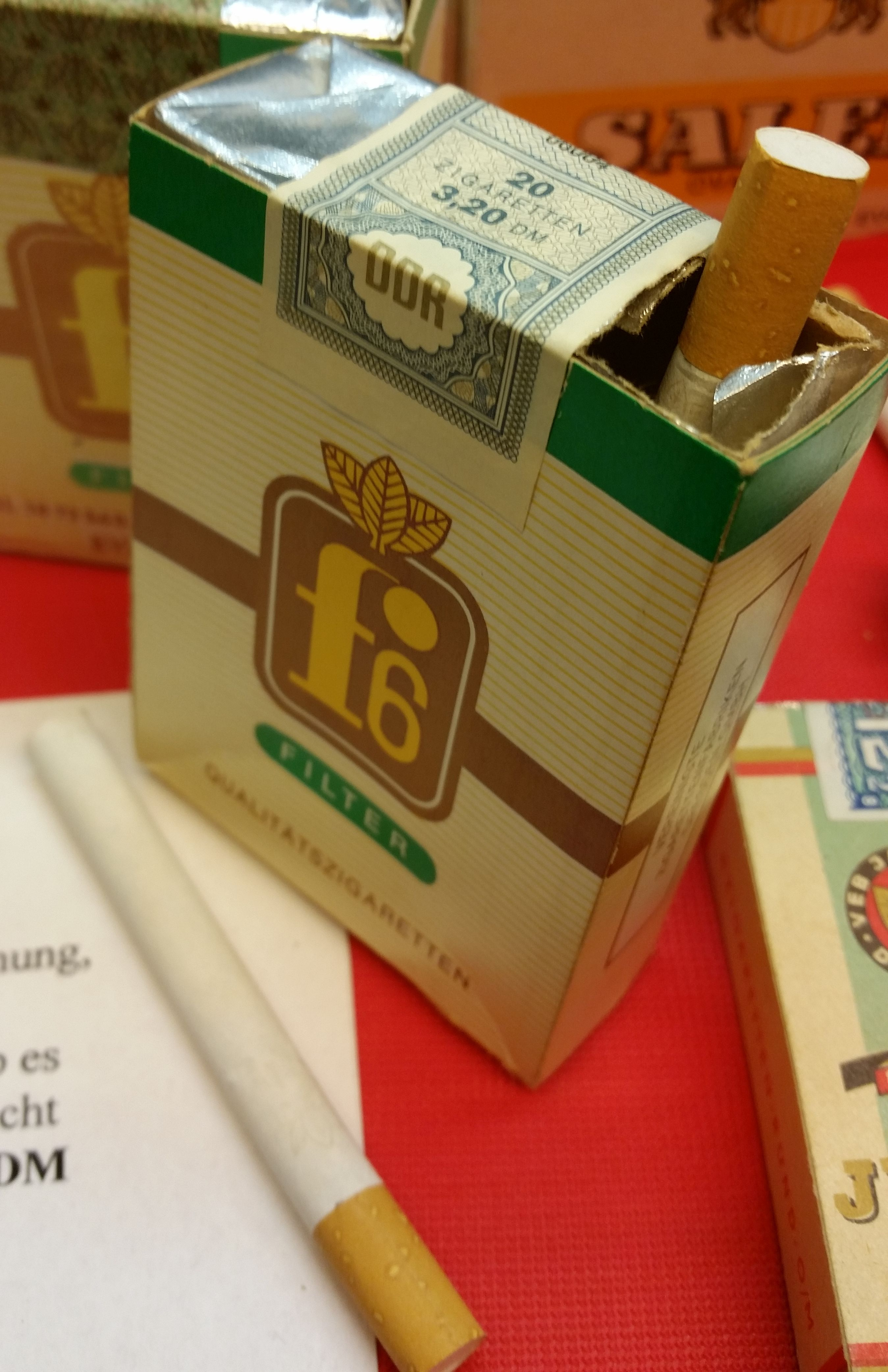
Pack of f6 cigarettes with a GDR seal

F6 was launched in East Germany in 1959 by the VEB Dresdner Zigarettenfabriken and was produced there until 1990. After German reunification, and based on experience from the East German Cabinet brand that was purchased by Reemtsma, and their marketing towards West German consumer needs which led to a fall of market share from 30% to 12% in East Germany, the marketing of f6 emphasises its East German origin with familiar packaging and appropriate slogans.

F6 had an 18% market share in the East German cigarette market, and a 3.5% market share in the reunified-German cigarette market (in the 8th place). To that point the manufacturers' pricing also played a role, with the brand being priced below the market average. The brand was awarded a Golden Effie for its marketing and brand communication. With the F6 Music Awards, the brand strategized to strengthen its East German image by explicitly promoting music from the region.

F6 cigarettes are manufactured in a listed building, the Zigarettenfabrik Jasmatzi, in the Striesen district of Dresden.

A pack of F6 cigarettes cost 3,20 Deutsche Mark in East Germany.

At the end of 2012, the cigarettes were taken off the market except for the "F6 Original" brand and replaced by the Chesterfield brand.

In March 2018, the price of a pack of F6 cigarettes in Germany was raised.

== Trivia ==
- The name "f6" stands for "Filterzigarette der 60er Jahre" which translates to filter cigarette of the 60s. The claim that the name comes from a former production site at Yenidze, being close to the Fernverkehrsstraße 6 in East Germany (F6 for short), is not true.

== Products ==
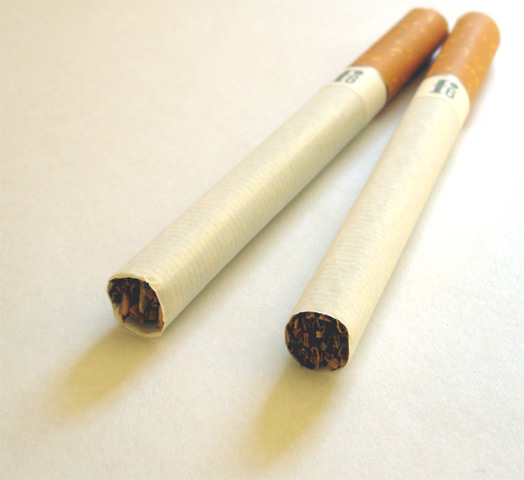
f6 are famous for their short filters

- f6 (nicotine: 0.8 mg; tar: 10 mg; carbon monoxide: 9 mg)
- f6 silver (nicotine: 0.3 mg; tar 3 mg; carbon monoxide: 4 mg) (no longer produced)
- f6 blue (nicotine: 0.5 mg; tar: 6 mg; carbon monoxide: 7 mg) (now Chesterfield Blue)
- f6 Fine Flavor (formerly f6 Light) (nicotine: 0.8 mg; tar 7 mg; carbon monoxide: 8 mg) (no longer produced)
- f6 International Blend (nicotine: 0.8 mg; tar: 10 mg; carbon monoxide: 10 mg) (no longer produced)
- f6 Full Flavor (formerly f6 red or f6 sun) (nicotine: 0.8 mg; tar: 10 mg; carbon monoxide: 10 mg) (now Chesterfield Red)
- f6 Menthol (nicotine: 1.0 mg; tar: 12 mg; carbon monoxide 9 mg) (no longer produced)
- f6 Menthol Fresh (nicotine: 0.5 mg; tar: 6 mg; carbon monoxide: 7 mg) (now Chesterfield Menthol)
- f6 Quick Sticks Fine Flavor (Long pre-made tubes, intended to be quickly inserted into a cigarette tube and then cut with scissors.)
- f6 Zigarettentabak (rolling tobacco 120 g)
- f6 Zigarettentabak (rolling tobacco 30 g)
- f6 Zigarillos (cigarillos)
- f6 Tobacco Block (compressed tobacco block, in a box that is inserted into a specialized cigarette injector.)

== See also ==
- Tobacco smoking
