= Nieuw Binckhorst =

Coordinates: 52.0689°N 4.3414°E

Nieuw Binckhorst is a former industrial area in southeast The Hague, Netherlands, originally called Binckhorst, for which a plan was adopted in 2009 to transform 99.5 hectares (246 acres) into a mixed-use development along the lines of New Urbanism, including residential, employment and entertainment components and with Randstadrail regional light rail service. The Hague's long-term plan Structuurvisie 2020, "Structural Vision 2020", sees Nieuw Binckhorst as a future part of the city center of The Hague. It is seen as fundamental to the realization of the international ambitions of The Hague, and of the Randstad conurbation.
