= King's (cigarette) =

Danish cigarette brand

King's (or King's Favourites) is a Danish brand of cigarettes owned by conglomerate British American Tobacco, and produced by House of Prince.

== Overview ==
King's was established in April 1946 on Chr. Augustinus' Factories at Amager. In 2003, the brand got an official trademark registration.

The brand is mainly sold in Denmark, but also was or is sold in Greenland, Norway and Germany.

== Variants of the King's brand ==
Pack of King's

- Original has no filter (70 mm) and is made of a blended tobacco mixture in which Virginia tobaccos dominate. Tar 10 mg, nicotine 0.8 mg and carbon monoxide 6 mg.
- Quest's Filter contains a typical American blend tobacco mixture (84 mm). The strength equals that of a full flavour filter cigarette. King's Filter was launched in 1995 at the same time as King's Filter Sand. Tar 10 mg, nicotine 0.9 mg and carbon monoxide 10 mg.
- Sand contains a typical American blend tobacco mixture (84 mm). King's Sand was launched in 1995 at the same time as King's Filter. Tar 8 mg, nicotine 0.7 mg and carbon monoxide 9 mg.
- Blue is a filter cigarette with an American blend tobacco mixture. King's Blue was launched in 1997. Tar 6 mg, nicotine 0.5 mg and carbon monoxide 7 mg.
- Red is a filter cigarette (70 mm) with a Virginia tobacco mixture. King's Red was launched in 2003. Tar 10 mg, nicotine 0.8 mg and carbon monoxide 10 mg.
- Green is a filter cigarette with an American blend tobacco mixture. Kings's Green is made of additive free tobacco. King's Green was launched in 2006. Tar 10 mg, nicotine 0.9 mg and carbon monoxide 9 mg
- Orange is a filter cigarette with an American blend tobacco mixture. Kings's Orange is made of additive free tobacco. King's Orange was launched in 2006. Tar 7 mg, nicotine 0.7 mg and carbon monoxide 7 mg.

== See also ==
- Tobacco smoking
