= Maryland (cigarette) =

Luxembourgish cigarette brand

- An old Luxembourgish pack of Maryland cigarettes, with a health warning in French at the bottom of the pack.
- Product type: Cigarette
- Produced by: Landewyck Tobacco
- Country: Luxembourg
- Introduced: 1944; 82 years ago
- Markets: See Markets

Maryland is a Luxembourgish brand of cigarettes, currently owned and manufactured by "Landewyck Tobacco", In Luxemburg.

== History ==
Maryland was introduced in 1944 when raw tobacco for Landewyck's other brand Africaine was in short supply and became a popular brand in Luxembourg, becoming known as a "cigarette for everyone".

== Markets ==
Maryland cigarettes are mainly sold in Luxembourg, but also were or still are sold in Germany, Belgium, Spain, Switzerland, Israel, Kuwait, Uruguay, United Arab Emirates, Mauritius and the United States.

== See also ==
- Tobacco smoking
