= Ducal (cigarette) =

Luxembourgish cigarette brand

- An old Luxembourgish pack of Ducal cigarettes, with a French and German warning at the bottom of the pack.
- Product type: Cigarette
- Produced by: Landewyck Tobacco
- Country: Luxembourg
- Introduced: 1969; 57 years ago
- Markets: See Markets

Ducal is a Luxembourgish brand of cigarettes, currently owned and manufactured by Landewyck Tobacco.

== History ==
Ducal was established in 1969 by Landewyck Tobacco in response to a price war in the cigarette market during the 1960s. During this time, smokers began to favour filtered and king-size 25-pack cigarettes over the traditional 20-packs.

== Advertising ==
Ducal is advertised on billboards, as well as through branded items such as ashtrays and advertising pins.

== Controversy ==
In 2014, two e-cigarette businessmen named their brand "le Grand Ducal" ("the Great Ducal" in English). Landewyck Tobacco issued a cease and desist letter, requesting the name of the brand to be changed due to the unauthorised use of the brand name by a third party. The respondents claimed that despite the similarities between the brand names, their brand, logo and domain name had all been registered.

Ducal is currently protected under class 34 of the International Classification of Goods and Services, namely that of tobacco and smokers. However, the same law also applies to e-cigarettes. As of January 2018, a judge has yet to decide whether or not the name is a breach of the brand protection law.

== Markets ==
The brand is mainly sold in Luxembourg, but it is sold in Belgium, Netherlands (as rolling tobacco), Germany, Portugal and Peru.

== See also ==
- Tobacco smoking
