= Melbour =

Argentine cigarette brand

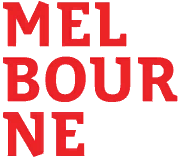
- Product type: Cigarette
- Current owner: Imperial Brands
- Produced by: Espert S.A. Tabacalera
- Country: Argentina
- Introduced: 2002; 24 years ago
- Markets: Argentina
- Website: espertsa.com.ar/melbourne

Melbour (now called Melbourne) is an Argentine brand of cigarettes, which is currently manufactured by Espert S.A. Tabacalera, a local division of Imperial Tobacco. The cigarettes are made from Virginia, Burley and Stern type tobaccos.

== Overview ==
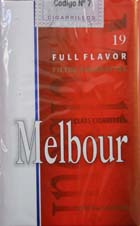
Old pack of Melbour, before the change of name

The production of Melbour cigarettes began in 2002, the year of the inauguration of the first floor of the Tabacalera company, founded by Carlos Daniel Tomeo.

In 2015, Philip Morris USA filed a lawsuit against Espert S.A. because of the brand name Melbour due to its similar and thus, confusing name. The company however, demonstrated it had acquired de facto rights in the local market. In the end however, the company agreed to change the name of the brand from Melbour to Melbourne to clear up any further controversies.

== Products ==
- Melbour Full Flavor
- Melbour Lights

== See also ==
- Cigarette
- Tobacco smoking
