= SG (cigarette) =

Portuguese cigarette brand

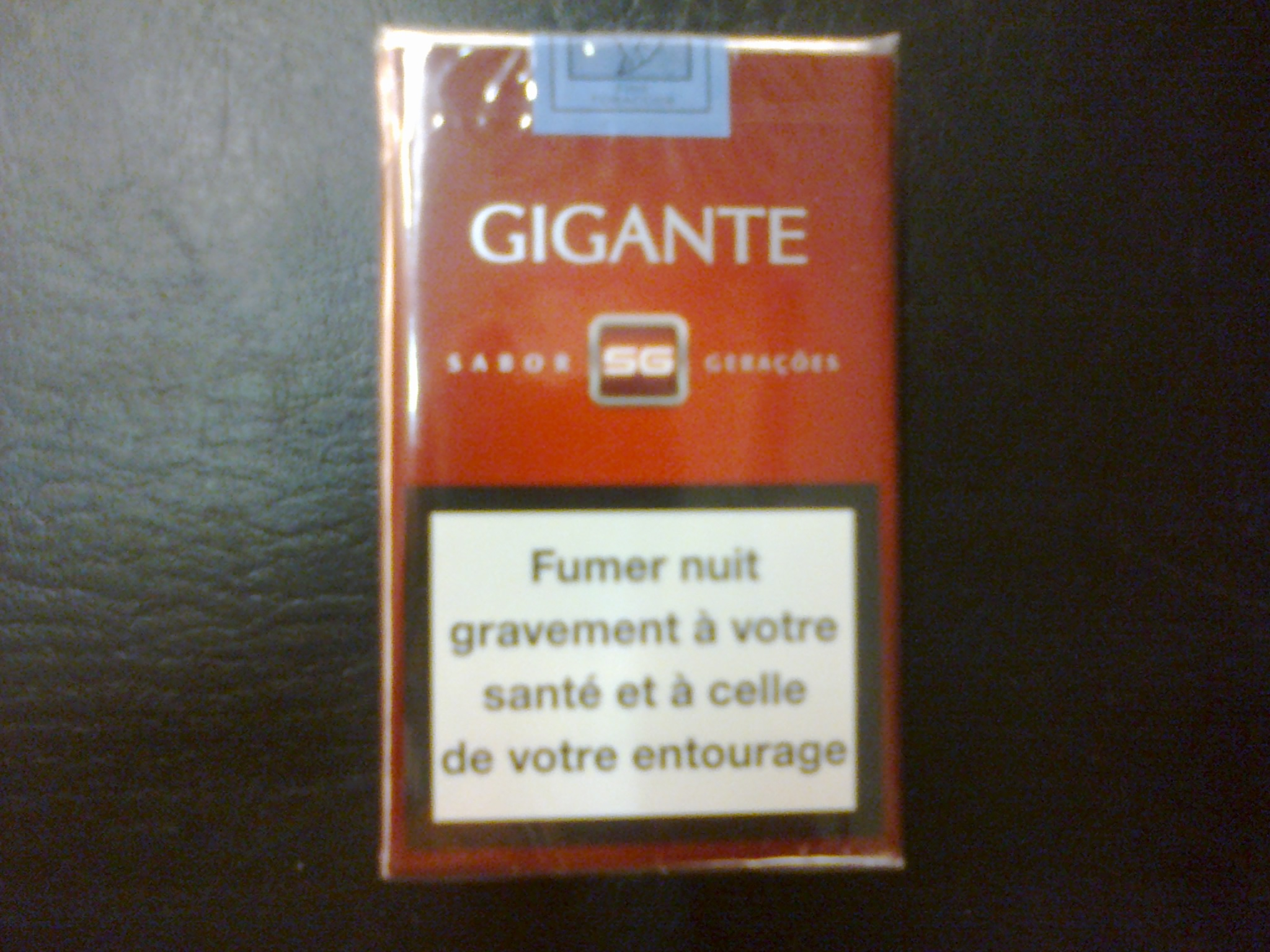
- French pack of SG cigarettes
- Product type: Cigarette
- Current owner: Philip Morris International
- Produced by: Philip Morris International
- Country: Portugal
- Introduced: 1950s
- Markets: See Markets
- Previous owners: Tabaqueira
- Tagline: "Sabor Gerações" ("Generations of taste")

SG is a Portuguese brand of cigarettes, owned and manufactured by Philip Morris International (previously, by its subsidiary Tabaqueira).

== History ==
The brand was founded in the 1950s during the Estado Novo dictatorship by the then government-owned Tabaqueira and was sold in Portugal and France. The name comes from the initials of the company that initially produced the cigarettes, the Sociedade Geral de Indústria Comércio e Transportes ("General Society-SG"). The General Society developed their activities in various branches of the economy, including shipping. On the company's ships, the letters SG were painted on the chimney. The slogan used is "Sabor Gerações" ("Generations of taste"). SG is the second most sold brand in Portugal, after Marlboro, and is the most sold Portuguese brand.

As of 2016, variants of SG have been changed or have been removed completely, along with other brands like Chesterfield.

== Markets ==
SG was and is mainly sold in Portugal, but also was and still is sold in France, Switzerland, Austria, Czech Republic and Cape Verde.

== See also ==
- Tobacco smoking
