= Liggett Select =

American cigarette brand

- An old American pack of Ligget Select cigarettes
- Product type: Cigarette
- Current owner: Liggett Group
- Produced by: Liggett Group
- Country: United States
- Introduced: 1999; 27 years ago
- Markets: United States
- Website: http://liggettvectorbrands.com/

Liggett Select is an American brand of cigarettes, currently owned and manufactured by the Liggett Group, based in Mebane, North Carolina.

== History ==
Liggett Select was launched in 1999 as a discount brand. Liggett Select is the company's top seller.

In 2011, Liggett Vector Brands announced they would increase the price by 8 cents of their deep-discount brands: Liggett Select, Eve and Grand Prix.

In 2017, Liggett Select got a new pack design for all its variants.

== Products ==
=== King-size ===
- Liggett Select Red Kings
- Liggett Select Blue Kings
- Liggett Select Menthol Gold Kings
- Liggett Select Menthol Silver Kings
- Liggett Select Non-filter Kings

=== 100s ===
- Liggett Select Red 100s
- Liggett Select Blue 100s
- Liggett Select Orange 100s
- Liggett Select Menthol Gold 100s
- Liggett Select Menthol Silver 100s

== See also ==
- Cigarette
- Tobacco smoking
