= Työmies (cigarette) =

Former Finnish cigarette brand

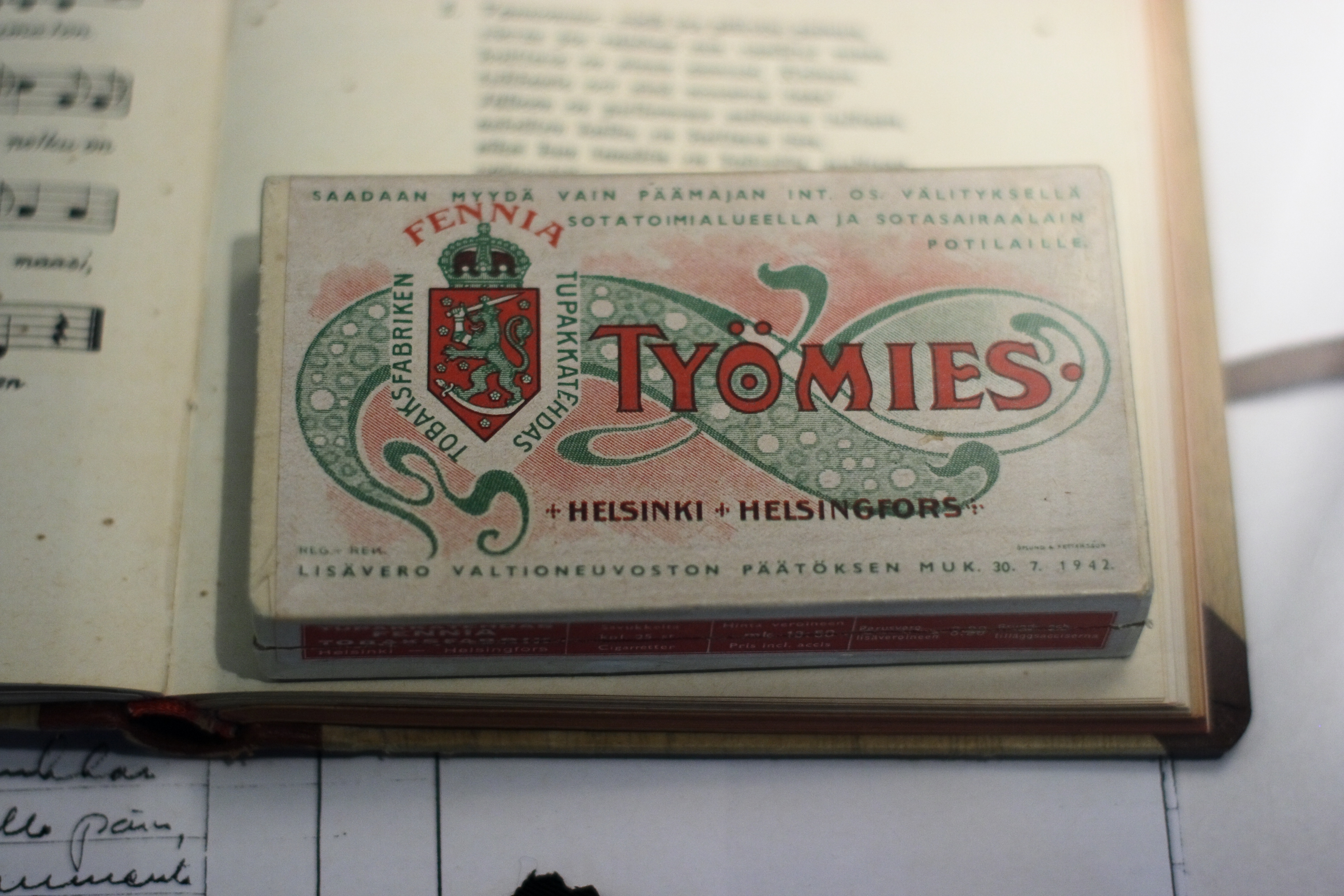
- An old Finnish pack of Työmies cigarettes.
- Product type: Cigarette
- Current owner: Tupakkatehdas Fennia (Fennia Tobacco Factory)
- Country: Finland
- Introduced: 1902; 124 years ago
- Discontinued: 1984
- Markets: Finland

Työmies was a Finnish brand of cigarettes, which was owned and manufactured by Tupakkatehdas Fennia ("Fennia Tobacco Factory"). Työmies is Finnish for "worker" or "working man".

== History ==
The Greek businessman Achilles Kyriako Christides founded Fennia in 1899 and started manufacturing the Työmies cigarette in 1902. The brand was so popular that Fennia soon focused exclusively on its manufacture. In 1913 the factory moved to a building designed by architect Valter Jung and Emil Fabritius in the Koskikara block at the corner of Ruoholahdenkatu and Köydenpunojankatu streets in Helsinki.

Työmies, which was now known as "the people's cigarette" was marketed, amongst other things, as an economic one: "Smoking Työmies cigarettes is economical as, in terms of tobacco quantity, a box of Työmies cigarettes is equal to 2–3 boxes of cigarettes with a paper holder." (Finnish Social Democrat, May 1932) Various posters for this brand were also made during the 1930s.

In the fall of 1945, when the luxury supplies were put on ration stamps, a woodcutter who cut four stacked cubic meters of logs was able to buy a "logging site power pack" containing coffee, sugar and Työmies cigarettes.

Especially through the 1952 Summer Olympics in Helsinki, foreign cigarette brands arrived in Finland and domestic production slowed down. Työmies was manufactured for decades up to 1984 when the Medicines Board prohibited its production as such because of the high levels of tar and nicotine. An advertisement from 1960 describes the Workman's Cigarette like this: "A manly man's stout cigarette. A working man's cigarette is always full of tobacco. Burns only when you want it to."

== See also ==
- Tobacco smoking
