= Africaine (cigarette) =

Luxembourgish cigarette brand

- An old Luxembourgish pack of Africaine cigarettes, with French and German text warning at the bottom of the pack.
- Product type: Cigarette
- Produced by: Landewyck Tobacco
- Country: Luxembourg
- Introduced: Early 1940s
- Markets: Luxembourg, Germany, Italy

Africaine is a Luxembourgish brand of cigarettes, owned and manufactured by Landewyck Tobacco.

== History ==
Africaine was launched in the early 1940s during World War II in Maryland because of the lack of raw tobacco at the time to produce African cigarettes. After the end of the war, the brand became popular within Luxembourg.

The brand is mainly sold in Luxembourg, but it was or still is sold in some parts of Germany and Italy.

== See also ==
- Tobacco smoking
