= RO Tambunan =

Indonesian lawyer and politician

Robert Odjahan Tambunan (24 July 1935 – 5 September 2015), known as RO Tambunan, was an Indonesian lawyer veteran and politician from the Indonesian Democratic Party of Struggle.

Born in North Tapanuli, North Sumatra, Tambunan became famous when he became the lawyer of the Chairman of the Indonesian Democratic Party (PDI) and for Megawati Sukarnoputri on the case of the invasion from the PDI office on July 27, 1996. The RO then led the Indonesian Democracy Defenders team (the defense team) from 1997 to 1999 that advocated the case. He died in September 2015 in Bekasi, West Java.
