= Mocne =

Polish cigarette brand

- Product type: Cigarette
- Current owner: Imperial Tobacco Polska, a subsidiary of Imperial Tobacco
- Produced by: Imperial Tobacco Polska, a subsidiary of Imperial Tobacco
- Country: Polish People's Republic
- Introduced: 1950s
- Markets: Polish People's Republic, Poland
- Previous owners: Wytwórnia Wyrobów Tytoniowych, Reemtsma

Mocne (Polish for "Strong") is a Polish brand of cigarettes, currently owned and manufactured by Imperial Tobacco.

== History ==
An old Polish pack of Mocne cigarettes, with a Polish text warning at the bottom of the pack

Mocne was launched in the 1950s in a variety of designs and by several factories of the state-owned tobacco monopoly, Wytwórnia Wyrobów Tytoniowych. In the early 1990s the brand was bought by the Reemtsma company, now a subsidiary of Imperial Tobacco. Since then a variety of consumer choices were added, including Lights, Menthol and Extra Lights. In addition to the traditional soft packet, a hard packet was also introduced.

== Controversy ==
=== Trademark dispute ===
In August 2006, it was reported that Imperial Tobacco Polska filed a request for invalidation of the right of protection for "AS MOCNY t" R-139925 registered for Tobacco Plants in Lublin Spółka Akcyjna.

The Supreme Administrative Court in its judgment of 25 May 2006 case file II GSK 64/06 held that the word "mocne" (in English: "strong") itself that is used as an indication of cigarettes, has not sufficient distinctive character as a trade mark. It may appear as part of a trade mark, but on a distinctive characteristic of a trade mark, which includes the word "mocne", will decide other words or images and the word "mocne" will remain a purely informational sign that could not become distinctive through use as a trade mark, even in a long term.

The SAC held that all manufacturers of cigarettes have the right to use purely informational sign to indicate the quality of cigarettes sold.

== Products ==
- Mocne
- Mocne Jasne
- Mocne Superlight
- Mocne Menthol

Below are all the variants of Mocne cigarettes, with the levels of tar and nicotine included.

Pack	Tar	Nicotine
Mocne	15 mg	1,3 mg
Mocne Jasne	10 mg	1,0 mg
Mocne Superlight	???? mg	???? mg
Mocne Menthol	???? mg	???? mg

== See also ==
- Cigarette
- Tobacco smoking
