= Alain Delon (cigarette) =

French cigarette brand

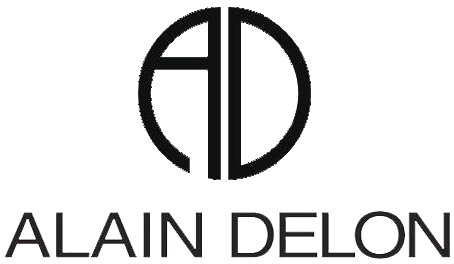

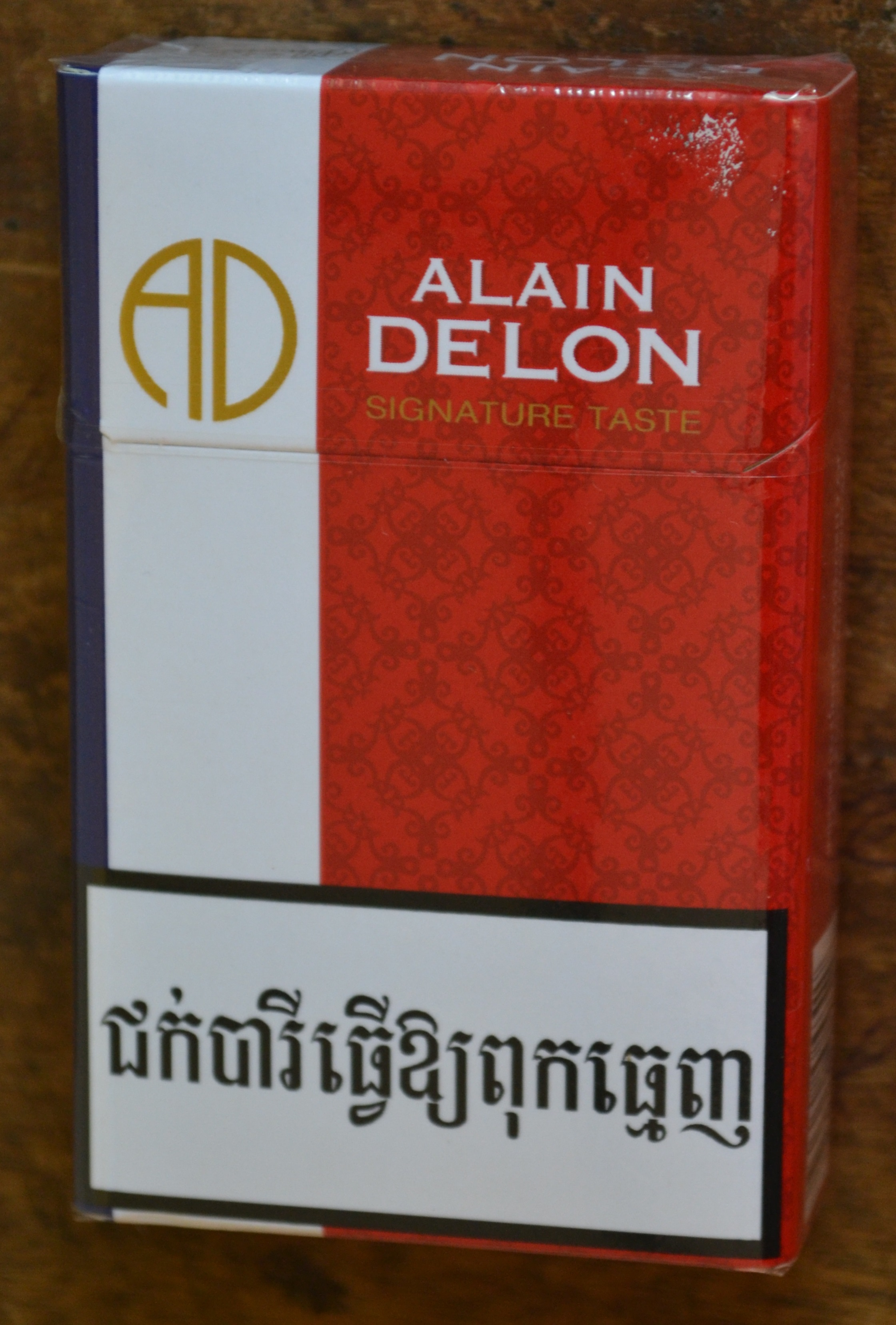
- Product type: Cigarette
- Current owner: BAT Cambodia, a division of British American Tobacco
- Introduced: 1992; 34 years ago
- Discontinued: 2014, resumed again in 2016
- Markets: Cambodia, Thailand, Myanmar, Laos, Vietnam, Hong Kong, Russia
- Tagline: "A taste of France", "Signature taste"

Alain Delon is a French brand of cigarettes, currently owned and manufactured by Altadis. The brand name refers to the French actor Alain Delon.

== History ==
Alain Delon was launched in 1992 for the Japanese market by SEITA, which became Altadis in 1999 after merging with the Spanish company Tabacalera. Since the acquisition of this brand by British American Tobacco, the brand is mainly sold by the subsidiary BAT in Cambodia.

The brand is popular in Asia, especially in Cambodia, because the film Zorro was the first foreign movie to be played in China. Alain Delon cigarettes are sold in Thailand, Myanmar, Laos and Vietnam as well. The brand is also sold in Russia and Hong Kong.

Two slogans have been used for the brand: "A taste of France" was the one used until 2014, while "Signature taste" has been in use since 2016.
