= Klubi =

Former Finnish cigarette brand

- An old Finnish pack of Klubi cigarettes, with a Finnish and Swedish text warning at the bottom of the pack.
- Product type: Cigarette
- Produced by: Rettig Group Oy Ab
- Country: Finland
- Introduced: 1901; 125 years ago
- Discontinued: Mid 2000s
- Markets: Finland

Klubi was a Finnish brand of cigarettes, which was manufactured by "Rettig Group Oy Ab".

== History ==
Klubi was founded in 1901 and was sold with a number of different variants of cigarettes. The best known of these were the Klubi 7 (Club 7) and its successor Klubi 77 (Club 77), so-called "straw clubs" with hollow paper holders and green-and-white packaging, the white inner cover of which was allegedly used by people for taking notes and even architectural drawing.

In the beginning of the 20th century, consumers began to demand lighter cigarettes from the Rettig plant. The first product versions were Klubi 1 (1901) and Klubi 2 (1902), but these were not very popular in Finland, although the Klubi 2 cigarette reached an export success in the United Kingdom. Domestic success began with the Klubi 7 variant in 1907. The best-selling Klubi cigarette products from the 1910s until the 1930s besides the Klubi 7 were the Klubi 17, the Klubi Malta became popular variants while more and more Klubi cigarettes were introduced to the market.

In 1943 the Klubi 7 variant had to be replaced due to a lack of raw materials with a new version called Klubi 77, which then became the all-time most popular Klubi variant.

Klubi cigarettes were produced until the mid 1990s, when new anti-tobacco regulations of the European Union became a major obstacle. No agreement had been reached about the necessary production technology of low-tar cigarettes. In 2003 the Franco-Spanish tobacco business Altadis bought the brand and tried to market the Klubi 77 cigarettes in a modernized box, but the nostalgic novelty product no longer fulfilled consumer expectations. In later years the plant was producing at least the Klubi products Klubi 22, which was filtered, and Klubi 27.

== See also ==
- Tobacco smoking
