= Metasa =

Paraguayan tobacco company

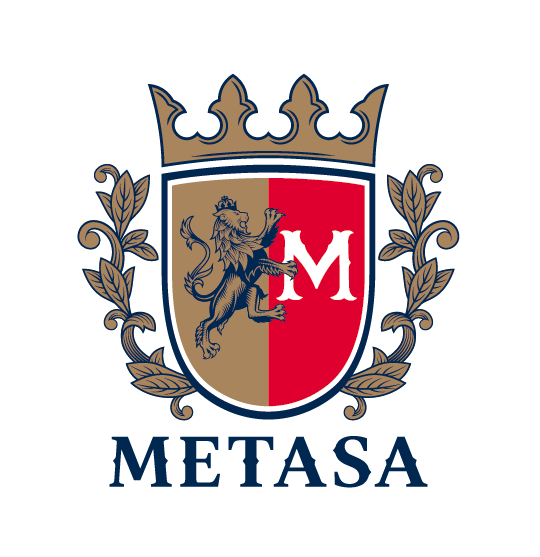
- Native name: Mercury Tabacos S.A.
- Type: Public company
- Industry: Cigarette production
- Genre: Tobacco
- Founded: January 28, 2004; 22 years ago
- Founder: Roberto W. Escobar González
- Headquarters: Ciudad del Este, Paraguay
- Area served: Multinational
- Products: Classic, Ouro Fino, Polo Club, Silver, Rainbow, Suave
- Website: https://www.mercury.com.py/

Mercury Tabacos S.A., also known as Metasa, is a Paraguayan company known for the production of cigarettes.

== History ==
Metasa was created on 28 January 2004 in the city of Asunción by Roberto W. Escobar González. Their headquarters are located in Ciudad del Este.

== Products ==
Metasa fabricates the following cigarette brands: Classic, Ouro Fino, Polo Club and Silver. They export much of the fabricated cigarettes. In the United States, the company owns the brands Rainbow and Suave. They have international factories, including in the city of Alto Paraná, Brazil.

Metasa buys cigarettes from Tabesa, company once owned by the president Horacio Cartes, and it was its main client from 2017 to 2021.

== Irregularities ==
In 2009, their tobacco package health warning was invalidated due administrative reasons, but the matter was solved with the change of the package pictures.

Metasa is allegedly one of the biggest companies profting with cigarette smuggling in countries such as Brazil and Argentina. Multiple cases of cigarette apprehensions have happened since Metasa creation.

Metasa was tied to Rubens Catenacci, convicted in 2008 for laundering money in the doleiro Alberto Youssef scheme. He controlled 80% of the company's assets. In 2022, Metasa was tied to the senator Erico Galeano, accused of laundering money from narcotraffic. According to the Paraguayan Secretariat of Money and Goods Laundry, on 10 March 2022, Metasa received ₲ 852,537,303 as compensation for the exit of Galeano from the company. He controlled 1% of the company's assets. The Paraguayan Public Prosecutor's Office accused Metasa of smuggling and money laundry.

== See also ==
- Tobacco industry
- List of multinational corporations
