= Manchester (cigarette) =

Cigarette brand based in the United Arab Emirates

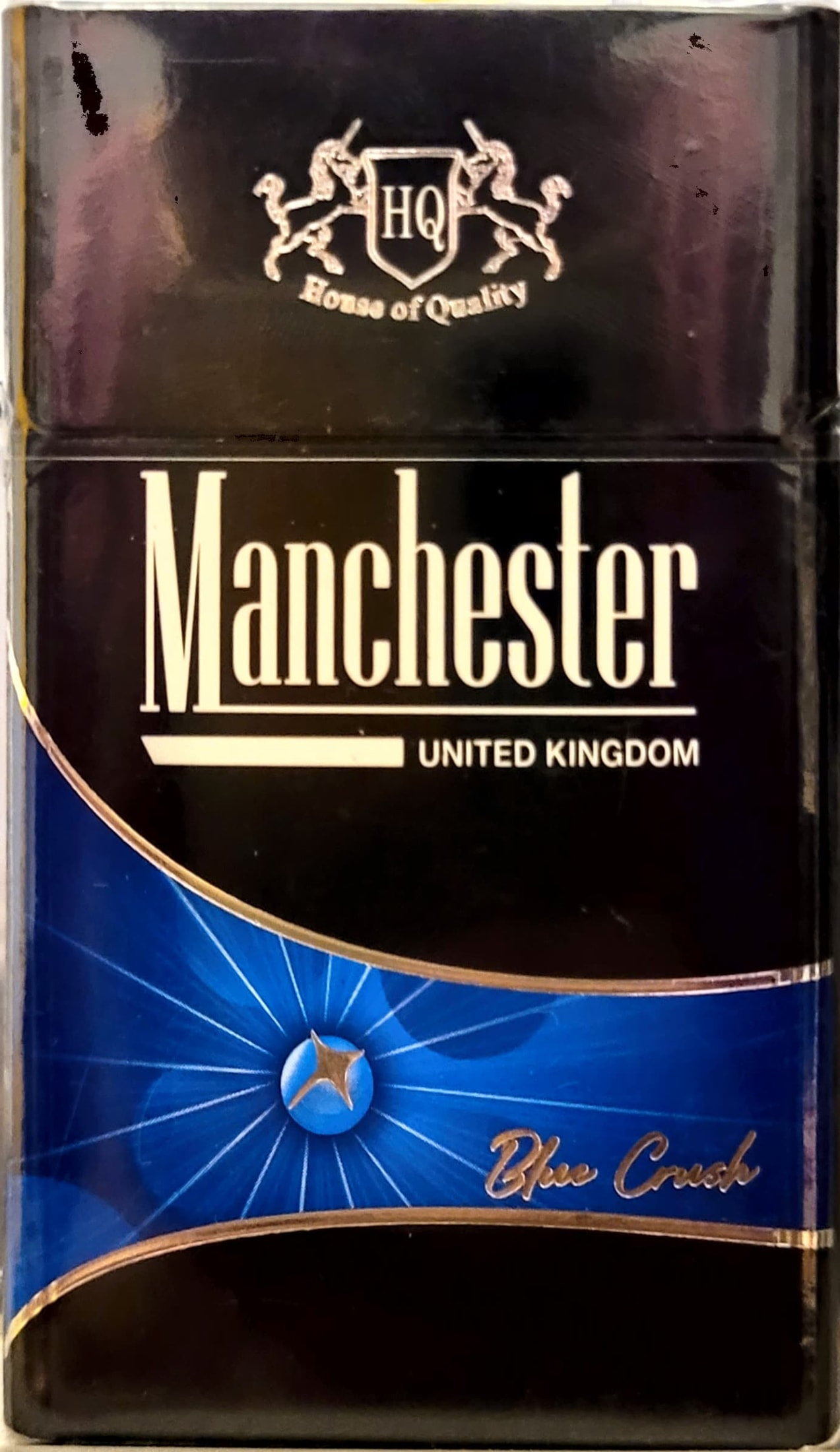
- Product type: Cigarette
- Current owner: Khaled al-Mahamid
- Produced by: J.S.S Tobacco Limited
- Country: United Arab Emirates
- Website: www.manchestercigarettes.com

Manchester is a brand of cigarettes based in Dubai, United Arab Emirates owned by Syrian businessman Khaled al-Mahamid through J.S.S Tobacco Limited. While the brand itself is believed to be legal, its products have frequently appeared in the illicit cigarette trade outside the UAE, particularly in Australia.

== Background ==
The brand is believed to have existed since at least the late 2000s.

=== Popularity on the black market ===
The brand is readily available in Australia, where it is illegally imported and does not comply with any local regulations. Packs of Manchester cigarettes often retail for less than A$15, less than half the price of the cheapest legal pack. A tobacco industry report from 2013 suggested that in that year, Manchester accounted for 1.2% of total manufactured cigarette consumption in Australia, higher than any other illicit brand. A separate tobacco industry report from 2024 suggested that in 2022, Manchester accounted for 1.4% of total manufactured cigarettes in Australia, which rose to 4.6% in 2023.

Illicit Manchester cigarettes have also been found and seized in Ireland. A BBC News report from 2025 showed Manchester cigarettes present in the United Kingdom.

== Manufacture ==
The manufacture of Manchester cigarettes is believed to take place in the Jebel Ali Free Zone in Dubai.

United Nations Office on Drugs and Crime researcher Ted Leggett stated that although Manchester cigarettes may be legally produced, "it is not clearly packaged for legal sale almost anywhere in the world."

== Ownership and corporate structure ==
The Manchester brand is owned by Syrian businessman Khaled al-Mahamid through J.S.S Tobacco Limited. A second company, Adam General Trading, is believed to be involved in the distribution of Manchester cigarettes from Dubai, but has not been suggested as involved in criminal activity. Al-Mahamid is said to have a managerial role in Adam General Trading.
