= Mark Adams No. 1 =

German cigarette brand

Mark Adams No. 1 or Mark Adams is a German brand of cigarettes currently owned and manufactured by Grand River Enterprises Germany. It is manufactured in the GRE cigarette factory in Kloster Lehnin, Brandenburg an der Havel.

The main market for Mark Adams No. 1 is Germany. Other markets include the Netherlands, Austria, Spain, Italy, the Czech Republic, Slovenia and Lithuania.

== History ==
Mark Adams No. 1 was launched in the 1990s as a budget brand. Over the years, it became a popular discount brand and is currently sold in over 25 countries. The brand name has been officially registered since 15 November 2010 and expires on 2 June 2020.

The cigarettes come in 19 or 20-packs, 25-packs, 10-packs (which are banned since 2016) and in 100s. Roll-your-own cigarettes are also available in 30 or 50 grams of tobacco. Rolling paper is also available.

== Controversy ==
In November 2015, Grand River Enterprises Germany and Philip Morris had a dispute over the name of the Mark Adams No. 1 brand and the Mark 10 brand in Romania. Philip Morris accused GRE Germany that their Mark Adams brand caused confusion with their own Mark 10 brand. The Romanian Trademark Office (TMO) communicated to both parties in March 2016 that there was no likelihood of confusion between either brands, however.

== See also ==
- Tobacco smoking
