= VST Industries =

Indian company

VST Industries Ltd
- Type: Public
- Traded as: BSE: 509966; NSE: VSTIND
- ISIN: INE710A01016
- Industry: Conglomerate
- Founded: 10 November 1930 (as Vazir Sultan Tobacco Company Limited)
- Founder: Vazir Sultan
- Headquarters: Azamabad, Hyderabad, Telangana, India
- Key people: Naresh Kumar Sethi (chairman); Piyush Srivastava (managing director & CEO)
- Products: Tobacco
- Revenue: ▲US$117 million
- Number of employees: 784
- Website: https://vsthyd.com

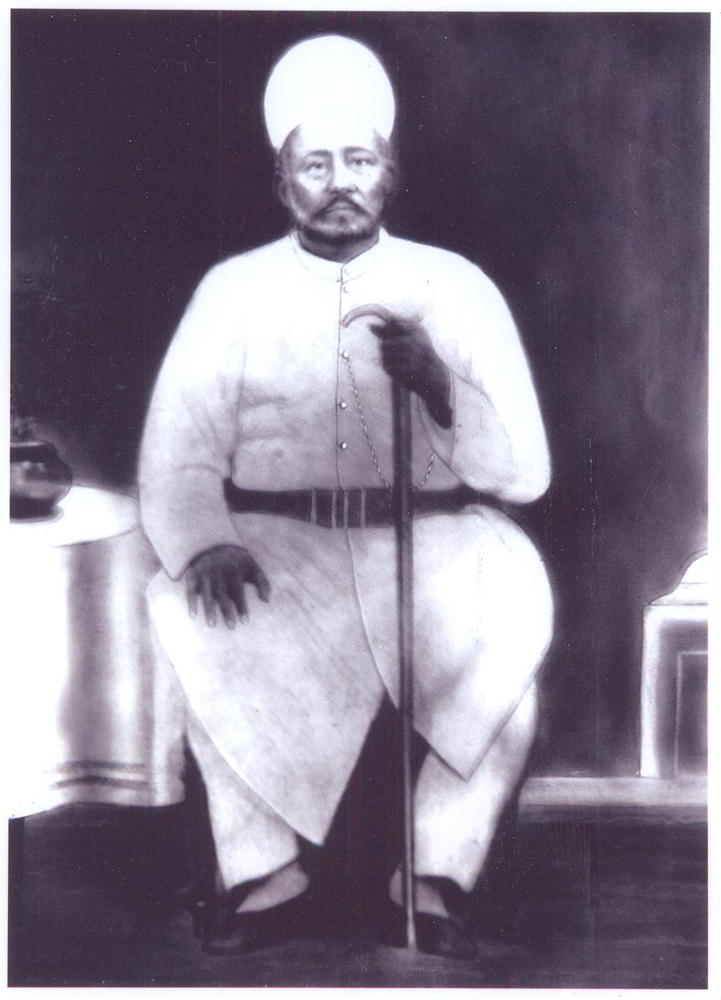

VST Industries Ltd is an Indian publicly-listed company which manufactures and distributes cigarettes. The company is headquartered in Hyderabad.

VST Industries started off as the Vazir Sultan Tobacco Company, and became an affiliate undertaking of British American Tobacco group of the United Kingdom. It became fully independent and registered as VST Industries Ltd in 1983. British American Tobacco, through its subsidiaries, owns a 32.16% stake in the company.

== History ==
The company was incorporated on 10 November 1930 as the Vazir Sultan Tobacco Company Limited under the Hyderabad Companies Act No. IV of 1320 Fasli. In April 1983, it was renamed VST Industries Limited. Over the decades, the company established a presence in the Indian cigarette manufacturing industry with a portfolio of regional and national brands.

== Tobacco leaf operations ==
VST Industries is also engaged in the trading and processing of unmanufactured tobacco. According to the company, tobacco leaf procurement and processing form a key component of its operations, supporting both domestic cigarette manufacturing and exports to international markets.

The company states that it works with a large network of contracted farmers across tobacco-growing regions in southern India and has developed specialised tobacco varieties, including Indian Oriental tobacco and Dark Fire Cured tobacco, for use in domestic and export markets. VST reports that its tobacco leaf business achieved a turnover of ₹472 crore in FY 2024–25, representing year-on-year growth.

== Operations ==
VST Industries’ principal business activities include the manufacture and trading of cigarettes and unmanufactured tobacco. The company operates manufacturing facilities at Azamabad, Hyderabad, and Toopran in Telangana. The Toopran facility, which integrates primary and secondary manufacturing divisions, became fully operational during FY 2024–25.

According to the company, VST distributes its products through a nationwide network of wholesale dealers and retail outlets and maintains regional offices in major Indian cities. Unmanufactured tobacco is also exported to overseas markets.

== Products and brands ==
VST Industries markets a portfolio of cigarette brands across different segments. Its brands include Total, Editions, Charms, Moments and Special. In FY 2024–25, the company introduced new variants such as Editions Trio, Total Spin and Total Paan Delight.

== Financial performance ==
For the financial year ending 31 March 2025, VST Industries reported revenue from operations of ₹1,80,943 lakh and a net profit of ₹29,039 lakh. The board recommended a dividend of ₹10 per share for FY 2024–25.

== Corporate social responsibility and ESG ==
VST Industries publishes an annual ESG report outlining its environmental, social and governance initiatives. According to the company, its CSR activities include programmes in healthcare, education, rural development and environmental sustainability. The company reported CSR expenditure of ₹844 lakh during FY 2024–25.

== Governance ==
The company is governed by a board comprising executive, non-executive and independent directors. As of April 2025, Naresh Kumar Sethi serves as chairman of the board, and Piyush Srivastava as managing director and chief executive officer.

== Shareholding ==
British American Tobacco Plc is the principal promoter of VST Industries and held approximately 32.16% of the company’s equity as of 2025. Other shareholders include institutional investors and public shareholders, including Bright Star Investments Private Limited.

== See also ==
- British American Tobacco
- Tobacco industry in India
