= Popularne =

Polish cigarette brand

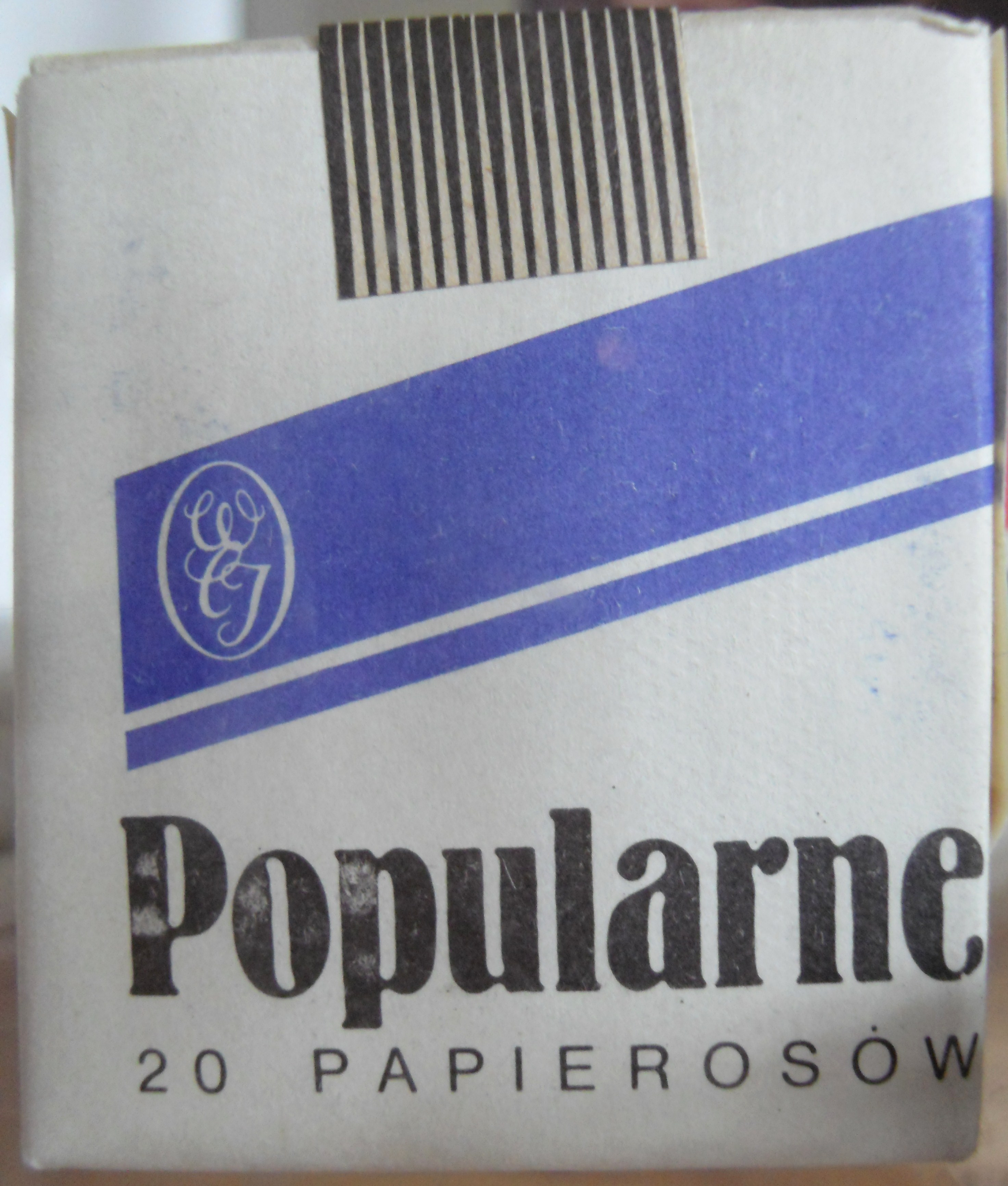
- An old Polish pack of Popularne cigarettes
- Product type: Cigarette
- Current owner: Państwowe Zakłady Przemysłu (State Tobacco Industry)
- Country: Poland
- Discontinued: 1996; 30 years ago
- Markets: Polish People's Republic, Poland

Popularne is a Polish brand of cigarettes, currently owned and manufactured by the State Tobacco Industry in Kraków. Consumers called them populares, killers or gwoździe (Polish for nails).

== History ==
Until the beginning of the 1980s, Popularne was called Sport. Originally, the cigarettes did not have filters; Popularne with filters became available at the end of the 20th century. The content of tar and nicotine was higher Popularne than in modern manufactured cigarettes.

== See also ==
- Tobacco smoking
