= Ceylon Tobacco Company =

Sri Lankan tobacco company

Ceylon Tobacco Company PLC
- Logo of Ceylon Tobacco Company
- Type: Public Subsidiary
- Traded as: CSE: CTC.N0000; S&P Sri Lanka 20 Index component
- ISIN: LK0042N00008
- Industry: Tobacco
- Founded: 1906; 120 years ago
- Headquarters: Colombo, Sri Lanka
- Key people: Suresh Shah (Chairman); Monisha Abraham (Managing Director/CEO)
- Revenue: ▲LKR134.369 billion (2021)
- Operating income: ▲LKR26.127 billion (2021)
- Net income: ▲LKR16.146 billion (2021)
- Total assets: ▲LKR26.468 billion (2021)
- Total equity: ▲LKR8.987 billion (2021)
- Owners: Philip Morris Brand SARL (8.32%)
- Number of employees: ▲269 (2022)
- Parent: British American Tobacco International Holdings BV (84.13%)
- Website: www.ceylontobaccocompany.com

Ceylon Tobacco Company PLC (CTC) is a Sri Lankan tobacco company engaged in the manufacture, marketing and export of cigarettes. It is a subsidiary of British American Tobacco. CTC holds the monopoly of cigarette and tobacco sales in Sri Lanka. British Tobacco started selling cigarettes in 1904-1911. CTC has a primary listing on the Colombo Stock Exchange since 1980s.

== Ownership ==
84% of the company is owned by British American Tobacco International and minor stake owned by Philip Morris International. Company market capitalization is approximately US$1.5 billion. It is the most valuable company in Sri Lanka.

== History ==
In 1905, the British Ceylon Government's leaf restraining infrastructure was reached out to a total takeover of all tobacco business activities in the country, including all made tobacco items like dumkola. Before 20th Century 90% of raw tobacco brought into the United Kingdom.

The Company started in 1906 and was owned by the British American Tobacco. Its first office was located in Prince Street, Colombo. By 1954, the company had become a Public Limited Company, company listed on Colombo stock market since 1950s. It's the earliest stock listed company in Sri Lanka. In 1980s Sri Lanka total tobacco crops increase to 15,594 ha. By 2010 it was producing 3.189 metric tons. The number of registered tobacco growers rose during the 1980s and most of the 1990s, but fell sharply in 1998 and 1999. It is estimated that tobacco growing provides between 5,355 and 16,580 full time equivalent jobs.

In 1997 cigarette manufacturing accounts for an estimated 89% of the value and 50% of the volume of all tobacco products sold in Sri Lanka. The 2018 survey found that 45.7% of men and 5.3% of women currently used tobacco.

Cigarette production
	2004	2005	2006	2007	2008	2009	2010	2011	2012	2013	2014	2015	2016
Production (million stick)	4,859	4,945	4,791	4,670	4,467	4,101	4,286	4,469	4,320	4,035	3,777	4,116	3,789
Revenue (billion LKR)	23.5	27	30.1	31.4	37.3	37.6	40.7	49.6	53.6	58.6	57.2	80	88.8
Raw tobacco (tons)	4,390	4,210	3,710	4,150	3,770	3,810	4,200	3,470	3,620	5,040	3,322		

== Government TAX ==
Price components Goldleaf cigarette (LKR)
	2008	2009	2010	2011	2012	2013	2014	2015	2016
Price	16	18	20	22	25	28	30	33	50
VAT	2.09	1.93	2.14	2.36	2.68	3.00	3.21	0	0.7
Tax share	75.5%	72.2%	69%	67.8%	67.9%	66.2%	68.1%	65.5%	76%

Sri Lanka direct and indirect cost of tobacco amounted to LKR 110 billion (the equivalent of 7% of Government revenue) Sri Lankan Government has been taxing tobacco since 1953. Tobacco tax collection in Sri Lanka has as of late been portrayed by politicisation and nearsightedness that brought about problematic accomplishment of monetary and wellbeing destinations. In any case, tobacco stays an essential supporter of the Treasury and it is important that policymakers get in right.

Sri Lanka demands a combination of assessments on tobacco among which extract charges are observable. From 1999 the tobacco charge was stretched out to incorporate produced tobacco further the Minister of Finance in control was given power to change the expense rate by a request distributed in the public authority Periodical.

View source data.

== Brands ==
CTC is the only legal cigarette manufacture and importer in Sri Lanka. The total marketable space is 5 billion sticks. The beedi market is around 2.3 billion sticks. According to the company it has 95% of the total market with 5% to illicit trade. BAT's decision to concentrate efforts on six Global Drive Brands has resulted in changes in CTC's brand portfolio, with newer brands like Dunhill and Viceroy being introduced over the past few years. Viceroy replaced Bristol which was the leading low price brand. Efforts to move consumers from Bristol to Goldleaf has retained 83% of their Bristol market segment along with 70% of volumes. JPGL and Pall Mall together brings 70% of the total sales.
