= Saat (cigarette) =

Malaysian cigarette brand

Saat cigarettes are produced by AKJ Marketing (Malaysia) Sdn Bhd. It is the largest local cigarette brand in Malaysia.
