= Superkings =

British cigarette brand

- Product type: Cigarette
- Produced by: Imperial Tobacco
- Country: United Kingdom
- Introduced: 1983; 43 years ago
- Markets: See Markets

Superkings is a British brand of cigarettes, currently owned and manufactured by Imperial Tobacco.

== History ==
French pack of Superkings

Superkings was launched in 1983. The name Superkings is derived from cigarettes that are larger than 84mm (king sized cigarettes); hence the name ‘Super kings’. The term is often used to describe any cigarette of regular gauge but with additional length to a king sized cigarette.

Being primarily marketed towards the working-class female smoker, the brand was the 9th most popular cigarette brand in the UK with 3.3% of the market share in 2007.

A study showed that, compared with 2013 and 2014, the original Superkings is the most popular cigarette variant, followed by Superkings Menthol and Superkings Blue. Superkings Menthol were taken off the market on 20 May 2020 due to the Europe Menthol ban, except for in Gibraltar where sale continues.

== Markets ==
Superkings is sold in the United Kingdom. It has also been sold in Ireland, the Netherlands, Germany, France, Spain, Malta, Greece, Cyprus, Belarus, Russia, Australia and New Zealand.

== See also ==
- Tobacco smoking
