= Caballero (cigarette) =

Dutch cigarette brand

- Product type: Cigarette
- Current owner: British American Tobacco
- Produced by: British American Tobacco
- Country: Netherlands
- Introduced: 1940s
- Markets: Netherlands, Belgium, Luxembourg, Germany, Spain

Caballero is a Dutch brand of unfiltered cigarettes owned and manufactured by British American Tobacco (BAT). Caballero is the Spanish word for knight.

== History ==
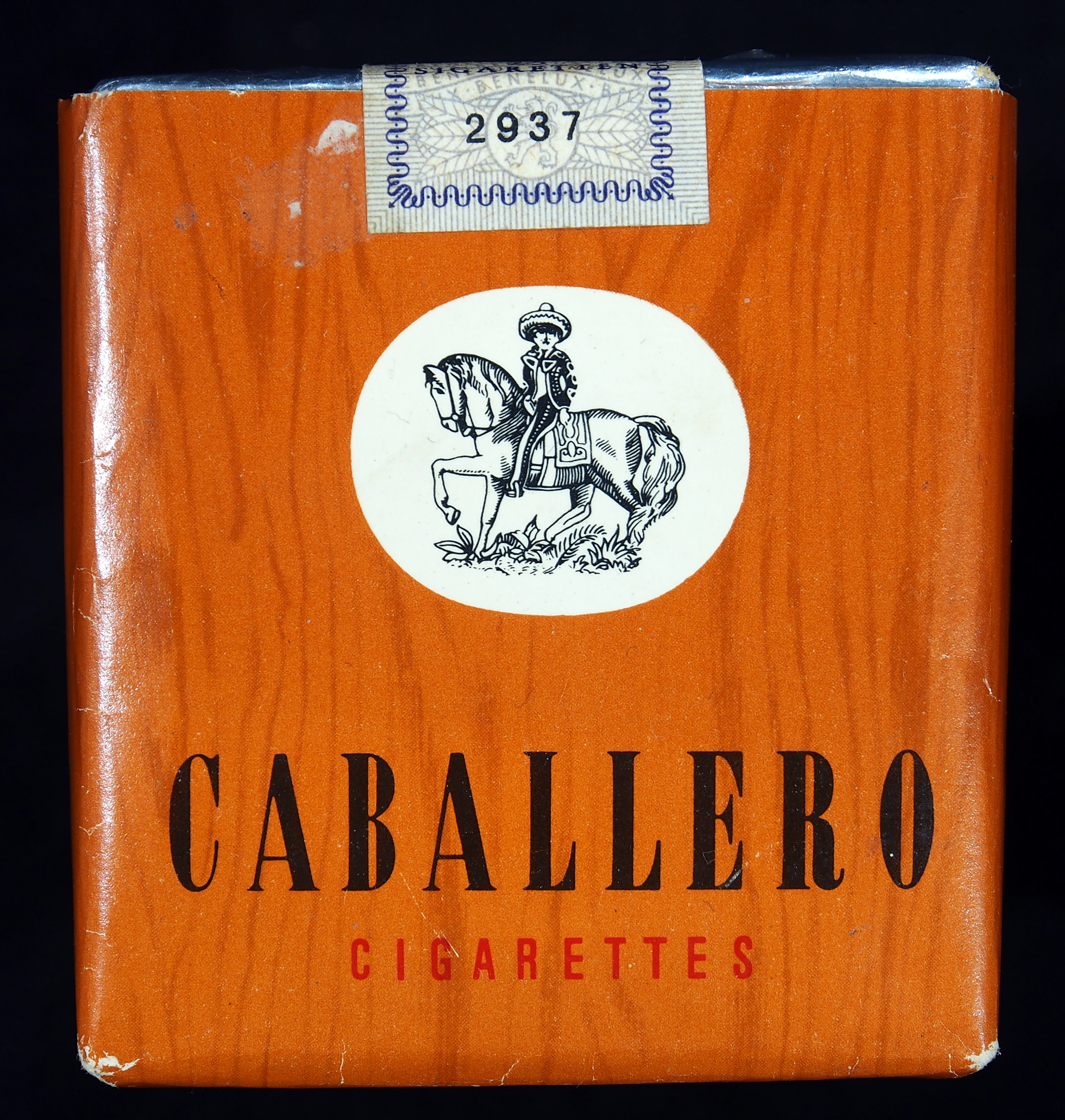
An old Dutch pack of Caballero cigarettes

Caballero was founded shortly after World War II. In 1945, the Dutch advertising agency Prad (portmanteau for "progressive" and "advertising") was formed, and created the slogan "Caballero, anders dan andere." ("Caballero, different than the others." in English). Dutchmen, mainly from the artistic parts of society, promoted the product (Ramses Shaffy and Henk van Ulsen, who later claimed he never smoked, were a few examples). A song was also created by the Dutch amusement band Leedy Trio, called "Ay-ay-ay! -die Caballero". The cigarettes had a market share of 4% in the 1950s due to the lack of popularity in comparison to the more popular brands Roxy and Lexington at the time, the appearance of the pack (which was associated with people who were "second-class citizens") and because the cigarettes (which were then sold in packs of 20, instead of the current packs of 25) cost 0.80 cents (about €0.36 today) compared to other brands, which cost 1 Dutch guilder. Instead of increasing the price to 1 guilder for 20 cigarettes, British American Tobacco opted to put 25 cigarettes in one pack, effectively offering more cigarettes for 1 guilder. The move turned out to be a success, increasing Caballero's market share from 4 to 36% in just a few years, also thanks to the effective advertising campaigns with the famous "Mexicaantje" ("Little Mexican" in English).

The cigarettes were produced in the Caballero factory (part of the factories of Ed Laurens) in Nieuw Binckhorst. Production moved to Zevenaar after BAT acquired the factory in 1995.

The main market is the Netherlands. Other markets are or were Belgium, Luxembourg, Germany and Spain. Caballero cigarettes have largely fallen out of fashion, but are still available in the plain variety.

== Sport sponsorship ==
Caballero sponsored the cycling team of Jan van der Horst from 1962 until 1972 and participated in the 1970 Tour de France under the "Caballero-Laurens" name.

== See also ==
- Tobacco smoking
- Belinda (cigarette)
