= Cabinet (cigarette) =

German cigarette brand

- Product type: Cigarette
- Current owner: Imperial Brands
- Produced by: Reemtsma
- Country: East Germany
- Introduced: 1972; 54 years ago
- Markets: See Markets

Cabinet is a German brand of cigarettes, as of 2026 owned and manufactured by Reemtsma, a subsidiary of Imperial Brands (formerly, "Imperial Tobacco"). It is mainly sold in the new states of Germany (formerly East Germany).

== History ==
Old German pack of Cabinet

Cabinet cigarettes were introduced in the German Democratic Republic (GDR) in 1972, produced by the operating state-owned tobacco company "VEB Tobacco Nordhausen" and the "Vereinigte Zigarettenfabriken" in Dresden. In 1989, before Reemtsma acquired the brand, monthly production was approximately 800 million cigarettes, and the market share was 33 percent. After Reemtsma took over production, market share fell below 10 percent in 1990.

Production took place in Nordhausen until the late 1990s, when the site was closed and production continued at the headquarters in Langenhagen. After German reunification, Reemtsma changed the Cabinet brand to accommodate Western standards; pollutants were reduced, and the tobaccos were remixed to be "lighter and wholesome". New variants and packaging were also introduced. Many GDR smokers, accustomed to stronger smoke, did not like the changes, and the brand lost significant market share after the changes. The price of a pack of 20 Cabinet cigarettes in the GDR was about 3.20 marks.

== Markets ==
Cabinet was mainly sold in East Germany, but also was or is still sold in West Germany and Poland.

== Products ==
- Cabinet Red
- Cabinet Blue
- Cabinet Gold
- Cabinet Fresh
- Cabinet Spice

Below are all the current brands of Cabinet cigarettes sold including the levels of tar, nicotine and carbon monoxide.

Pack	Tar	Nicotine	Carbon monoxide
Cabinet Red	8 mg	0,7 mg	8 mg
Cabinet Blue	6 mg	0,5 mg	6 mg
Cabinet Gold	2 mg	0,2 mg	2 mg
Cabinet Fresh	6 mg	0,5 mg	6 mg
Cabinet Spice	10 mg	0,9 mg	10 mg
Stand 03/2007.

== See also ==
- Tobacco smoking
