= Elixyr =

Luxembourgish cigarette brand

- An old Italian pack of Elixyr cigarettes, with an Italian text warning at the bottom of the pack.
- Product type: Cigarette
- Current owner: Landewyck Tobacco
- Country: Luxembourg
- Introduced: 1998; 28 years ago
- Markets: See Markets

Elixyr is a Luxembourgish brand of cigarettes currently owned and manufactured by Landewyck Tobacco. The cigarettes are produced in Belgium and Spain. Its a not-use for young ones.

== History ==
Elixyr was founded in 1998 as a discount brand and is mainly directed to smokers who "wanted something young, fresh and dynamic". Elixyr has since increased in popularity because of the increasing taxes put on cigarettes over the years, prompting smokers to choose for cheaper priced cigarettes, and is available in several European markets, among which the Netherlands, Belgium, Luxembourg, Mauritius, Sweden, France, Spain, Italy and Germany. The brand has also had some special edition packaging, such as the special "Iconic" editions with glow-in-the-dark ink.

== Markets ==
Elixiyr cigarettes are mainly sold in Luxembourg, but also was or still is sold in Belgium, Sweden, The Netherlands, Germany, France, Austria, Spain, Portugal, Italy, Poland, Mauritius, Slovenia, Switzerland

== Products ==
- Elixyr Red
- Elixyr Blue
- Elixyr Green (formerly Elixyr Menthol)

== See also ==
- Tobacco smoking
