= Belinda (cigarette) =

Dutch cigarette brand

- Product type: Cigarette
- Current owner: British American Tobacco
- Country: Netherlands
- Introduced: 1940s
- Markets: Netherlands

Belinda is a Dutch brand of cigarettes currently owned and manufactured by British American Tobacco.

== History ==
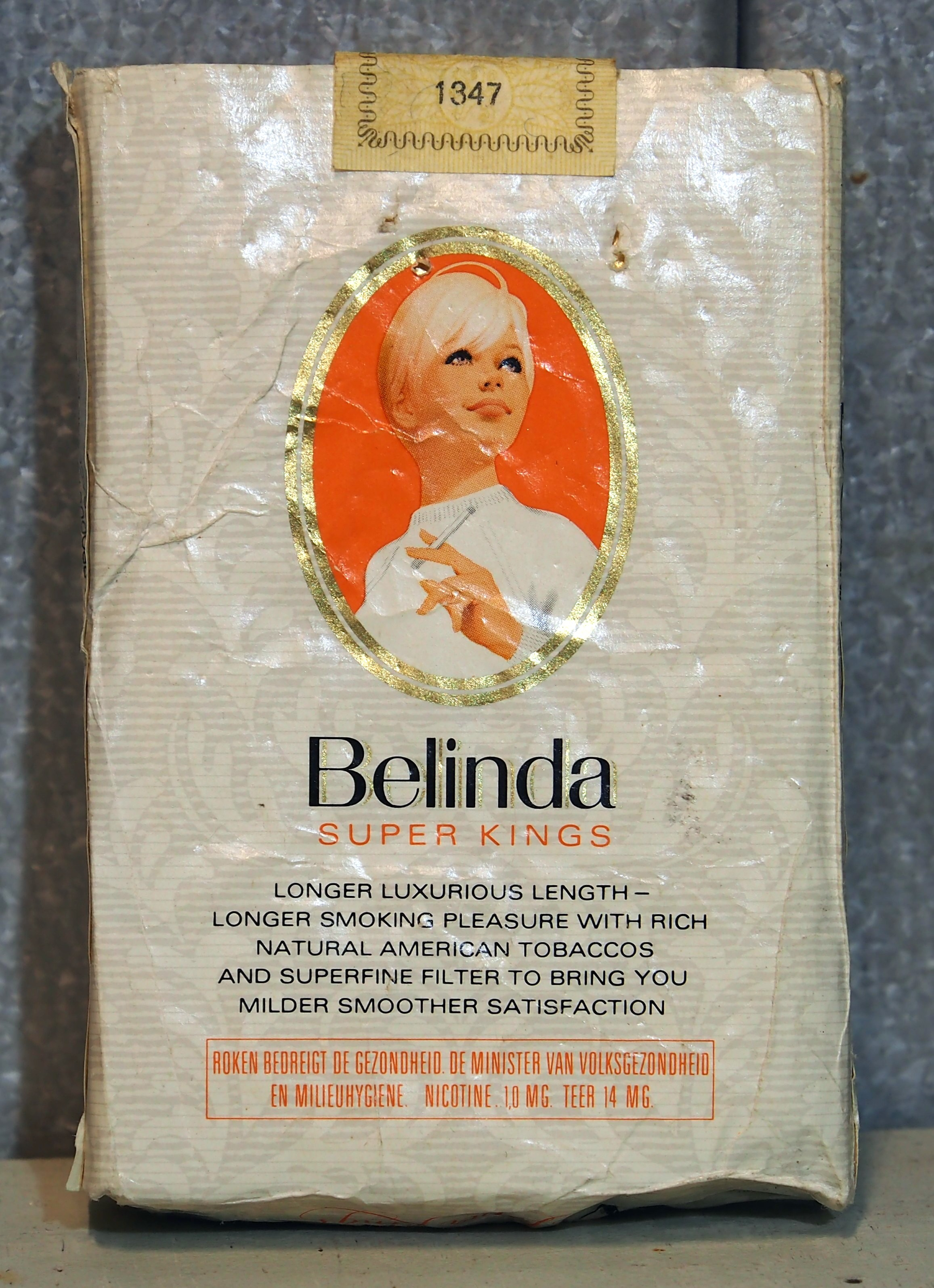
An old Dutch pack of Belinda cigarettes, with a Dutch text warning at the bottom of the pack

Belinda was founded in the 1940s and quickly gained popularity in the Netherlands, especially amongst women (as it was targeted towards them) and the wealthy. During the period of 1946 until 1996, posters made by the Dutch artist Frans Mettes were put on Dutch railway stations featuring the "Belinda Cigarette Girl" ("Sigarettenmeisje van Belinda" in Dutch), along with other known brands at the time like Droste cocoa, the Hulshof purse company and the "Zwarte Beertjes" ("Black Bears") adverts of Dutch artist, illustrator and graphic designer Dick Bruna. Belinda ads were also featured in the Dutch magazine Margriet. Belinda's popularity decreased after tobacco advertising in the Netherlands was banned completely in 2003 and because of increasing taxes on cigarettes which pushed Dutch smokers to buy cheaper brands. However, it is still one of the most known Dutch cigarette brands and is still being sold in the Netherlands alongside brands like Marlboro, Camel and Lucky Strike.

== Products ==
- Belinda Super Kings (hard pack)
- Belinda Super Kings (soft pack)
- Belinda Super Kings Menthol (hard pack)
- Belinda Super Kings Menthol (soft pack)

Below are all the current brands of Belinda cigarettes sold, with the levels of tar, nicotine, and carbon monoxide included.

Pack	Tar	Nicotine	Carbon monoxide
Belinda Super Kings hard pack	10 mg	0,8 mg	10 mg
Belinda Super Kings soft pack	10 mg	0,8 mg	10 mg
Belinda Super Kings Menthol hard pack	10 mg	0,8 mg	9 mg
Belinda Super Kings Menthol soft pack	10 mg	0,8 mg	9 mg

== See also ==
- Tobacco smoking
- Caballero (cigarette)
