= Reval (cigarette) =

German cigarette brand

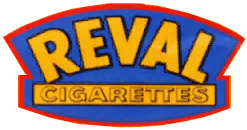
- Product type: Cigarette
- Current owner: Imperial Tobacco
- Produced by: Reemtsma
- Country: Germany
- Markets: Germany, France, Switzerland
- Tagline: "Echt im Tabak" (Real In Tobacco)

Reval is a German brand of cigarettes, currently owned and manufactured by Reemtsma, subsidiary of Imperial Tobacco.

== History ==
Reval softpack

The original creator and manufacturer of Reval was the Badische Tabakmanufaktur (Baden Tobacco Factory), which merged with Reemtsma in 1985. The slogan on the pack is "Echt im Tabak".

The packaging is characterised by a traditionally held blue text on a yellow background. The pictured coat of arms is not that of the city of Tallinn in Estonia, which was called Reval until 1918.

In 1976, a 20-pack of filtered or filterless Reval cigarettes cost 2.30 Deutsche Mark. In 2014, a 19-pack of filterless Reval cigarettes cost €5.40

From May 2015 onwards, the brands Eckstein No. 5, Juno and Salem No. 6 were gradually transferred to the Reval brand.

In May 2016, the Reemtsma Group announced that it had discontinued production of the filtered Reval variant (Reval filter Golden blend), due to the decision of Reemtsma to focus more on its main, big brands and because the EU introduced new packaging with shock picture warnings. The filterless variant is still being made however, and is available in soft pack and as rolling tobacco in pouches.

== Markets ==
Reval is mainly sold in Germany, but also was or still is sold in France and Switzerland.

== Products ==
Below are all the current brands of Reval cigarettes sold, with the levels of tar, nicotine and carbon monoxide included.

Pack	Tar	Nicotine	Carbon monoxide
Reval Filterless	10 mg	0,9 mg	6 mg
Reval Filter Golden Blend	10 mg	0,8 mg	10 mg
