= House of Prince =

Danish cigarette manufacturer

House of Prince A/S
- Company type: Subsidiary
- Industry: Tobacco
- Founded: 1957; 69 years ago as "Adler & Co."
- Founder: Julius Adler
- Headquarters: Denmark
- Products: Cigarettes
- Number of employees: 1,700 (2006)
- Parent: British American Tobacco

House of Prince A/S, is a Danish cigarette manufacturer. As Denmark's only cigarette manufacturer, it was an independent subsidiary of Scandinavian Tobacco Company until its sale to British American Tobacco in 2008.

In 2005, House of Prince posted sales of DKK 12.66 billion ($2.15 billion).

== History ==
The history of House of Prince dates to 1990 during reconstruction of Scandinavian Tobacco Company, and now houses all cigarette tobacco manufacturing of that company. The factory was built in 1951 and is located in Søborg, Denmark and produced approximately 60 million cigarettes daily.

The Prince cigarette was launched in 1957. The company produces about 12 million cigarettes by year. The factory closed in 2011.

The company supplies 95% of the Danish market and 37% of the Scandinavian market. The brand Prince has a market share of 34% of the Danish market and 42% of the Norwegian market.

In Latvia, the company founded a common Latvian-Danish company called SIA House of Prince Riga in December 1992 and acquired a stake in the state-owned Riga Tobacco Factory, becoming its sole owner in 2001. It was renamed Scandinavian Tobacco SIA in 2003 and SIA British American Tobacco Latvia in 2008. The factory, located on Miera iela in Riga, had been founded as a/s A. S. Maikapar in 1877 and built in 1912, but was nationalized by the Soviet occupation in 1940 and ultimately announced its closure in July 2009.

== Subsidiary companies ==
- House of Prince AB (Sweden)
- Scandinavian Tobacco S.A. (Poland)
- Scandinavian Tobacco Eesti AS (Estonia)
- Scandinavian Tobacco SIA (Latvia)
- UAB House of Prince Lithuania (Lithuania)
- Scandinavian Tobacco S.R.O. (Czech Republic)
- Scandinavian Tobacco Company Hellas S.A. (Greece)
- Scandinavien Tobacco Hungary kft. (Hungary)

== Cigarette brands by House of Prince ==
- Ava
- Asra
- Bravo
- Caines
- Cecil
- Cristal
- Christian of Denmark
- Corner - Now known as Pall Mall
- Danton
- Dark
- Delight
- Diplomat (Latvia)
- Elita (Latvia)
- Grom
- Grot
- Jūrmala (Latvia)
- King's
- LA - Los Angeles
- Look
- Meskie
- Mistral
- Nevada
- Newmore
- North State
- Prince
- Quattro
- Queen's
- Reven
- Rockets
- Rocky Mountains
- Savoy
- Scotsman
- Slim Agenda
- Slim Camelia
- Viking
- Walet
- Wall Street
