= Tobacco packaging warning messages =

Labels on tobacco products warning of the negative impacts of smoking

Tobacco package warning messages are warning messages that appear on the packaging of cigarettes and other tobacco products concerning their health effects. They have been implemented in an effort to enhance the public's awareness about the harmful effects of smoking. In general, warnings used in different countries try to emphasize the same messages (see below). Such warnings have also been required in tobacco advertising. The earliest mandatory warning labels on cigarette packaging were implemented by the United States in 1966. The first pictogrammes were implemented by Iceland in 1985, the first pictures by Canada in 2001.

The WHO Framework Convention on Tobacco Control, adopted in 2003, requires such warning messages to promote awareness against smoking. Implementing tobacco warning labels has been strongly opposed by the tobacco industry, most notably in Australia, following the implementation of plain packaging laws.

== Effectiveness ==
The effectiveness of tobacco warning labels has been studied extensively over the past 50 years, and research shows that they are generally effective in changing smoking attitudes and behaviors. A 2009 science review determined that there is "clear evidence that tobacco package health warnings increase consumers' knowledge about the health consequences of tobacco use". The warning messages "contribute to changing consumers' attitudes towards tobacco use as well as changing consumers' behavior".

Despite the demonstrated benefits of warning labels, the efficacy of fear-based messaging in reducing smoking behaviors has been subject to criticism. A 2007 meta-analysis demonstrated that messages emphasizing the severity of threat may be less effective at changing behaviors than messages focusing on susceptibility to threat. Additionally, the study found that warning labels may not be effective among smokers who are not confident that they can quit, leading the authors to recommend exploring other methods of behavior modification.

In many countries, a variety of warnings with graphic, disturbing images of tobacco-related harms (including hematuria and diabetes) are placed prominently on cigarette packages.

== Albania ==
As of 2020, all tobacco products in Albania must have one of the following general warning on the packaging: "Smoking kills - quit now" or "Smoking kills". Additionally, packaging must contain an information message about the product, as follows: "Tobacco contains over 70 substances that cause cancer". The general warning and the information message must occupy 50% of the packaging area of the side on which they are printed. Albania also requires the use of combined warnings that includes the text warning and a colored image, which must cover 65% of the front and back area of the packaging. Text-based general warning label formerly used on tobacco packages in Albania:

Pirja e duhanit vret
(Smoking kills)

== Argentina ==
General warning before 2013:

El fumar es perjudicial para la salud.
Ley N° 23.344
Smoking is harmful to health. (Law No. 23.344)

As of 30 January 2013, Argentina passed a law requiring all cigarette packages must include graphical warning labels that show the detrimental effects on the health of long-term smokers, including COVID-19 (added in 2022).

== Australia ==
On 1 December 2012, Australia introduced ground-breaking legislation and the world's toughest tobacco packaging warning messages to date. All marketing and brand devices were removed from the package and replaced with warnings, only the name of the product remains in generic standard sized text. All tobacco products sold, offered for sale or otherwise supplied in Australia were plain-packaged and labelled with new and expanded health warnings.

== Azerbaijan ==
In Azerbaijan, a text-only health warning in the Azeri language, "Smoking harms your health", is required to cover 30% of the front and back of the package. There is no requirement for rotation, and there is only one required health warning.

== Bangladesh ==
Bangladesh law requires rotating pictorial health warnings to cover at least 50% of the main display areas of all tobacco products. Misleading terms such as "light" and "low tar" are prohibited on tobacco packaging, but other misleading packaging (e.g., colors, numbers, and symbols) is not banned.

== Bolivia ==
Prior to 2020, Bolivia required graphic text and image warnings covering 50% of the pack on the main faces. However, in 2020 Bolivia passed Ley Nº 1280 (Law No. 1280). Ley Nº 1280 requires the display of graphic health warnings, consisting of both images and text, on the front and back (principal surfaces) of all cigarette packs that occupy 60% of each main face, and are located at the top of the face. The text warnings warn the population of the risks of consuming tobacco products, as well as the risk of exposure to the harmful effects of tobacco smoke and environmental risks. The warnings can only be obscured in the case of soft packs that require a support element. There are currently no required warnings on smokeless tobacco products.

== Bosnia and Herzegovina ==
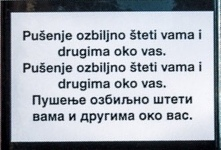
Warning in Bosnia and Herzegovina (2014). The Bosnian and Croatian versions are identical and the Serbian one is a Cyrilic transliteration of the exact same text.

Bosnia and Herzegovina law requires:

Front of packaging (covers 30% of surface):

- Pušenje je štetno za zdravlje (Smoking is harmful to health)
- Pušenje ubija (Smoking kills)
- Pušenje ozbiljno šteti vama i drugima oko vas (Smoking seriously harms you and others around you)

Back of packaging (covers 50% of surface):

- Pušenje uzrokuje rak pluća (Smoking causes lung cancer)
- Pušenje uzrokuje srčani udar (Smoking causes heart attacks)
- Pušenje uzrokuje moždani udar (Smoking causes strokes)
- Pušenje u trudnoći šteti zdravlju Vašeg djeteta (Smoking while pregnant harms your child)

Before 2011, a small warning with the text Pušenje je štetno za zdravlje (Smoking is harmful to health) was printed on the back of cigarette packets.

== Brazil ==
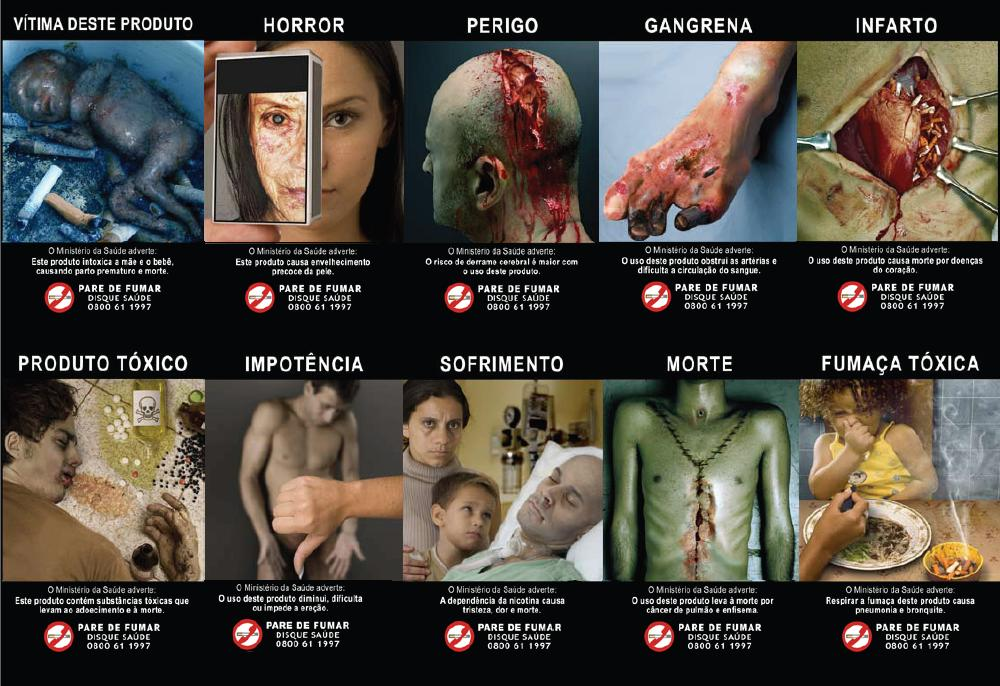
Brazil's third batch of graphic images (from 2009, since replaced), mandatory on cigarette packs

In 2001, Brazil became the second country in the world and the first country in Latin America to adopt mandatory warning images in cigarette packages. Warnings and graphic images illustrating the risks of smoking occupy 100% of the back of cigarette packs. In 2008, the government enacted a third batch of images aimed at younger smokers. The rule was in force for nine years until 2017, when yet another batch of warnings were introduced. They contain images as equally disturbing as the previous ones but also contain subtle messages such as "Você morre" (You die), "Você sofre" (You suffer) and "Você adoece" (You get sick).

Since 2003, the sentence

Este produto contém mais de 4,7 mil substâncias tóxicas, e nicotina que causa dependência física ou psíquica. Não existem níveis seguros para consumo dessas substâncias. (This product contains over 4,700 toxic substances and nicotine, which causes physical or psychological addiction. There are no safe levels for consuming these substances.)

is displayed in all packs.

== Brunei ==
The following warnings appear on cigarette packages in Brunei since 2007, based on those of Singapore though displayed in both Malay and English:

- MEROKOK MENYEBABKAN PELBAGAI KANSER (Smoking causes various cancers)
- MEROKOK MENYEBABKAN STROK DAN PENYAKIT JANTUNG (Smoking causes strokes and heart disease)
- MEROKOK MEMBUNUH (Smoking kills)
- MEROKOK MEROSAKKAN GIGI AWDA (Smoking damages your teeth)
- ASAP TEMBAKAU MEMBAHAYAKAN ANAK DAMIT AWDA (Tobacco smoke harms your baby)
- ASAP TEMBAKAU BOLEH MEMBUNUH ANAK DAMIT (Tobacco smoke can kill babies)
- MEROKOK MENYEBABKAN KANSER PARU-PARU (Smoking causes lung cancer)
- MEROKOK MENYEBABKAN MATI PUCUK (Smoking causes impotence)

== Cambodia ==
In August 2021, the Cambodian Ministry of Health mandated the display of pictorial health warnings, requiring them to cover 55% of the packaging and be updated every two years. The warnings range from a gangrenous foot to premature birth.

== Canada ==
Canada has had three phases of tobacco warning labels. The first set of warnings was introduced in 1989 under the Tobacco Products Control Act, and required warnings to be printed on all tobacco products sold legally in Canada. The set consisted of four messages printed in black-and-white on the front and back of the package, and was expanded in 1994 to include eight messages covering 25% of the front top of the package.

In 2000, the Tobacco Products Information Regulations (TPIR) were passed under the Tobacco Act. The regulations introduced a new set of sixteen warnings. Each warning was printed on the front and back of the package, covering 50% of the surface, with a short explanation and a picture illustrating that particular warning, for example:

WARNING: CIGARETTES CAUSE LUNG CANCER
85% of lung cancers are caused by smoking.
80% of lung cancer victims die within three years.

accompanied by a picture of cancerous growths inside a human lung. Canada thus became the first country to implement health warnings with pictures.

Additionally, on the inside of the packaging or, for some packets, on a pull-out card, "health information messages" provide answers and explanations regarding common questions and concerns about quitting smoking and smoking-related illnesses. The side of the package also featured information on toxic emissions and constituent levels.

In 2011, the TPIR were replaced for cigarettes and little cigars with the Tobacco Products Labelling Regulations (Cigarettes and Little Cigars). These regulations introduced the third and current set of 16 warnings in Canada. Currently, cigarette and little cigar packages in Canada must bear new graphic warning messages that cover 75% of the front and back of the package. The interior of each package contains 1 of 8 updated health warning messages, all including the number for a national quitline. The side of the package now bears 1 of 4 simplified toxic emission statements. These labels were fully implemented on cigarette and little cigar packages by June 2012 (though the 2000 labels still appear on other tobacco products). Canada also prohibits terms such as "light" and "mild" from appearing on tobacco packaging. The current labels were based on extensive research and a long consultation process that sought to evaluate and improve upon the warnings introduced in 2000.

In accordance with Canadian law regarding products sold legally in Canada, the warnings are provided in both English and French. Imported cigarettes to be sold in Canada which do not have the warnings are affixed with sticker versions when they are sold legally in Canada.

Health Canada considered laws mandating plain packaging, legal tobacco product packaging did still include warning labels, but brand names, fonts, and colors were replaced with simple unadorned text, thereby reducing the impact of tobacco industry marketing techniques. It was mandated in January 2020.

Canada became the first country in the world to require health warnings on each individual cigarettes and cigars, effective August 1, 2023, to be phased in over time when the regulation is fully in effect by April 2025.

== Chile ==
Since November 2006, all cigarette packages sold in Chile are required to have one of two health warnings, a graphic pictorial warning or a text-only warning. These warnings are replaced with a new set of two warnings each year.

== China ==
Under laws of the People's Republic of China, the Law on Tobacco Monopoly (中华人民共和国烟草专卖法) Chapter 4, Article 18 and Regulations for the Implementation of the Law on Tobacco Monopoly (中华人民共和国烟草专卖法实施条例) Chapter 5 Article 29, cigarettes and cigars sold within Mainland China should indicate the grade of tar content and "Smoking is hazardous to your health" (吸烟有害健康) in the Chinese language on the packs and cartons.

In 2009, the warnings were changed. The warnings, which occupy not less than 30% of the front and back of cigarette packs, show "吸烟有害健康 尽早戒烟有益健康" (Smoking is harmful to your health. Quitting smoking early is good for your health) in the front and "吸烟有害健康 戒烟可减少对健康的危害" (Smoking is harmful to your health. Quitting smoking can reduce health risks) in the back.

The warnings were revised in October 2016 and must occupy at least 35% of the front and back of cigarette packs. The following are the current warnings.

- In the front:
  本公司提示
  吸烟有害健康
  请勿在禁烟场所吸烟
  ("Our company notes that smoking is harmful to your health. Do not smoke in non-smoking areas" in Chinese)
- In the back:
  尽早戒烟有益健康
  戒烟可减少对健康的危害
  ("Quitting smoking as soon as possible is good for your health. It can also reduce health risks" in Chinese)
- or
  劝阻青少年吸烟
  禁止中小学生吸烟
  ("Dissuade teenagers from smoking. Prohibit primary and middle school students from smoking" in Chinese)

== Cuba ==
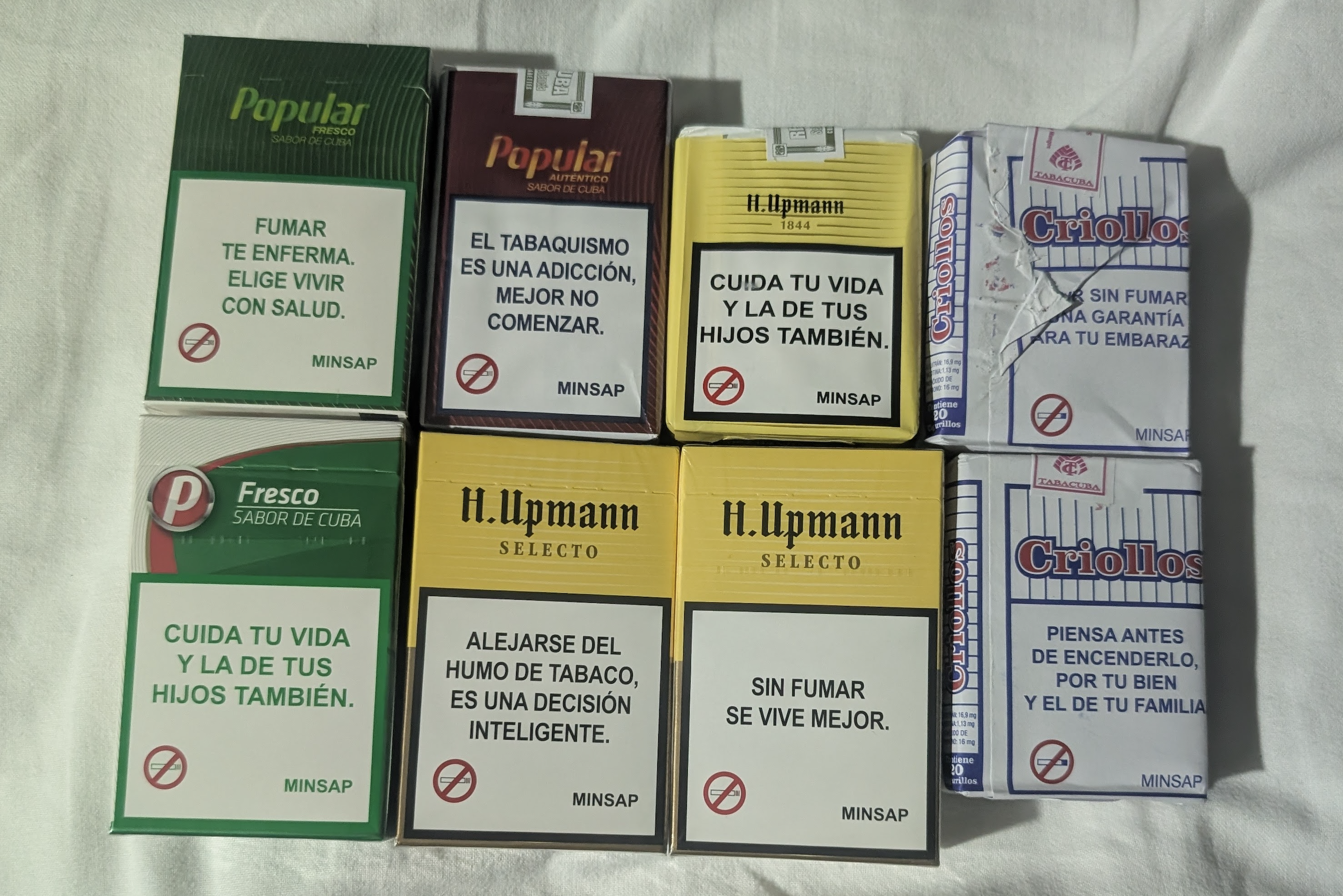
A collection of Cuban cigarettes, displaying various warning messages on the backs of the packs

Cigarette packs in Cuba are not allowed to use words such as "Ligeros" (Lights) or "Suaves" (Smooths), and are not allowed to contain advertising messages other than brand images. One or both sides of cigarette packs must display a warning, rotating between several preselected warning messages, although in practice, warnings are located almost exclusively on the back. The text must be in Spanish, with clear, visible, legible capital letters. It must be in the Arial font, centered, and the color of the warning must contrast with the background sufficiently to facilitate reading.

The warnings must either occupy 30% of each face or 60% of one face, with the choice of which left up to each individual company. The warnings cannot be located in a place that may be damaged upon opening of the pack, and they may or may not be accompanied by images/pictograms.

There can be no less than 4 rotating warnings at any given time, with an exception granted for "Criollos" and other similar brands made and designed for sale exclusively to Cubans and produced through modernization of Cuban factories.

The tar, nicotine, and carbon monoxide content must also be printed on the side of each pack.

== El Salvador ==
Cigarette packs have in El Salvador must have combined text and picture warnings covering at least 50% of each main display area. The warnings are rotated every 2 years. Terms such as "light" or "low-tar" are prohibited on packaging and labeling.

== European Union ==
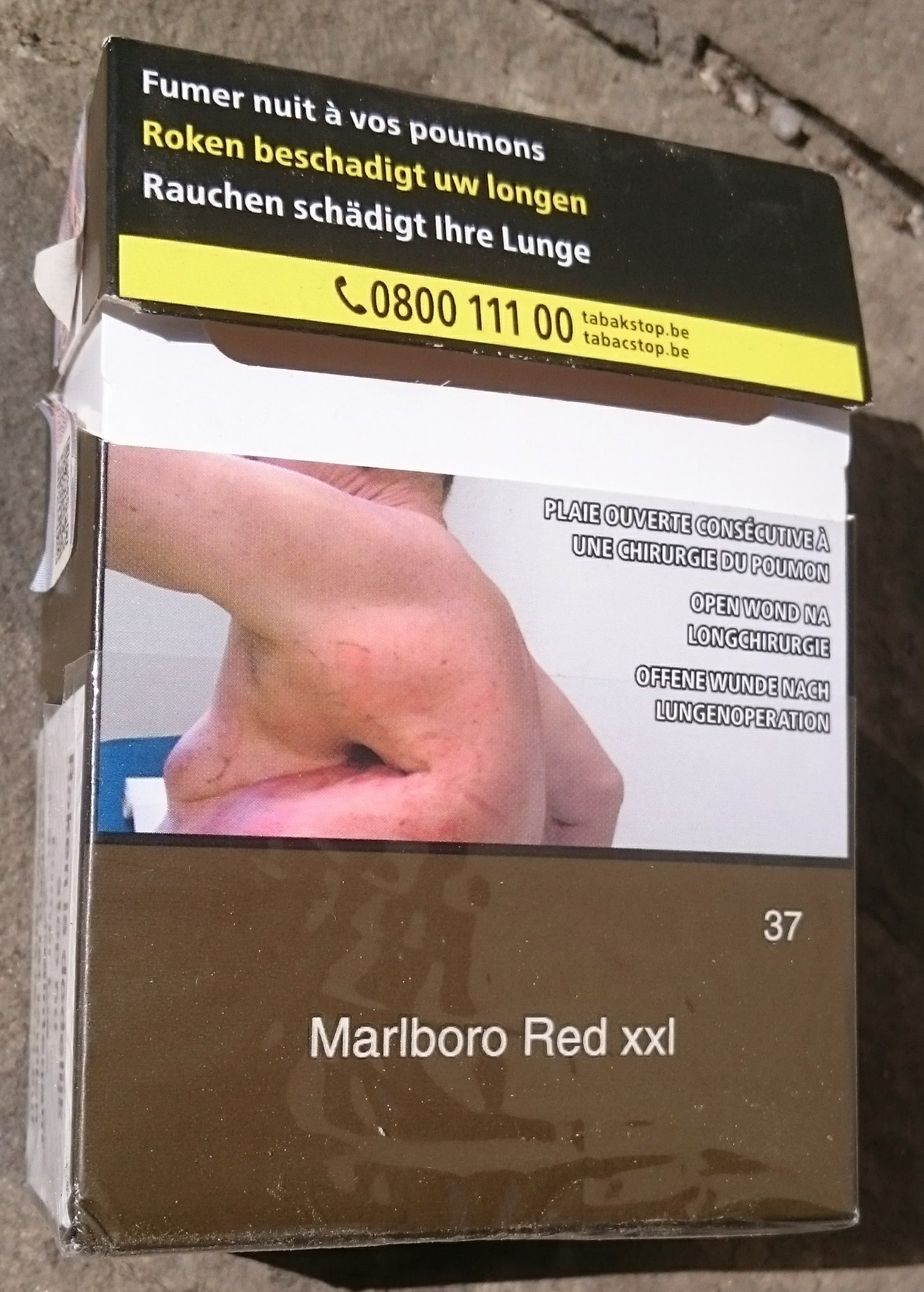
Plain tobacco packaging in Belgium.

Cigarette packets and other tobacco packaging have harmonized warnings across the European Union. They must include warnings in the same size and format and using the same approved texts (in the appropriate local languages) in all member states.

The current warnings are governed by the revised Tobacco Products Directive, which became applicable in EU countries in May 2016. The warnings cover the front, rear, and sides of the package, in a format where the health warning including a pictorial warning and cessation information must cover 65% of the front and back of the packaging, and a text-only health warning must cover 50% of the side of the packaging.

There are 13 text statements, each of which must be accompanied by one of 3 relevant pictures, which are rotated annually, meaning there are 42 pictorial warnings in total. These warnings are displayed in white text, or yellow and white text when the warnings are multilingual, on a black background in Neue Frutiger Condensed Bold font. The warnings are:

- Smoking causes 9 out of 10 lung cancers
- Smoking causes mouth and throat cancer
- Smoking damages your lungs
- Smoking causes heart attacks
- Smoking causes strokes and disability
- Smoking clogs your arteries
- Smoking increases the risk of blindness
- Smoking damages your teeth and gums
- Smoking can kill your unborn child
- Your smoke harms your children, family and friends
- Smokers' children are more likely to start smoking
- Quit smoking – stay alive for those close to you
- Smoking reduces fertility
- Smoking increases the risk of impotence

They are accompanied by cessation information in black text on a yellow background which includes either a phone number, website or the message "Get help to stop smoking: consult your doctor or pharmacist" in duty free stores. Each packet also carries two additional warnings on the side of the pack, in black Helvetica bold on a white background with a thick black border. These warnings are:

- Smoking kills or Smoking kills – quit now
- Tobacco smoke contains over 70 substances known to cause cancer

Plain packaging is also permitted under this directive. Plain packaging is used in Belgium, Denmark, France, Hungary, Ireland and The Netherlands.

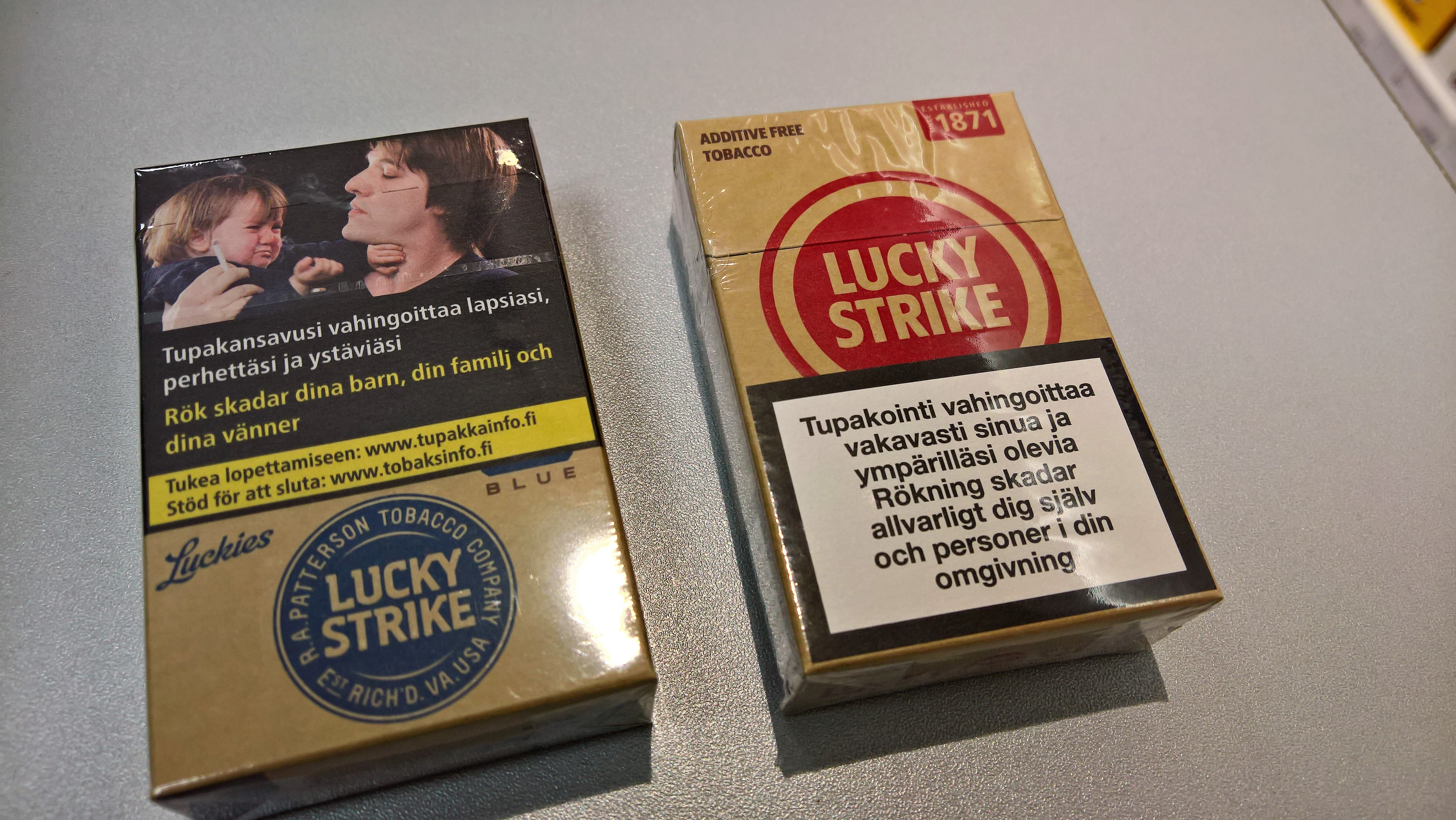
On the left there is a new Lucky Strike cigarette pack by a new EU directive meanwhile on the right there's an obsolete pack as red. The warning texts are both in Finnish and Swedish as they both are official languages in Finland.

=== History ===
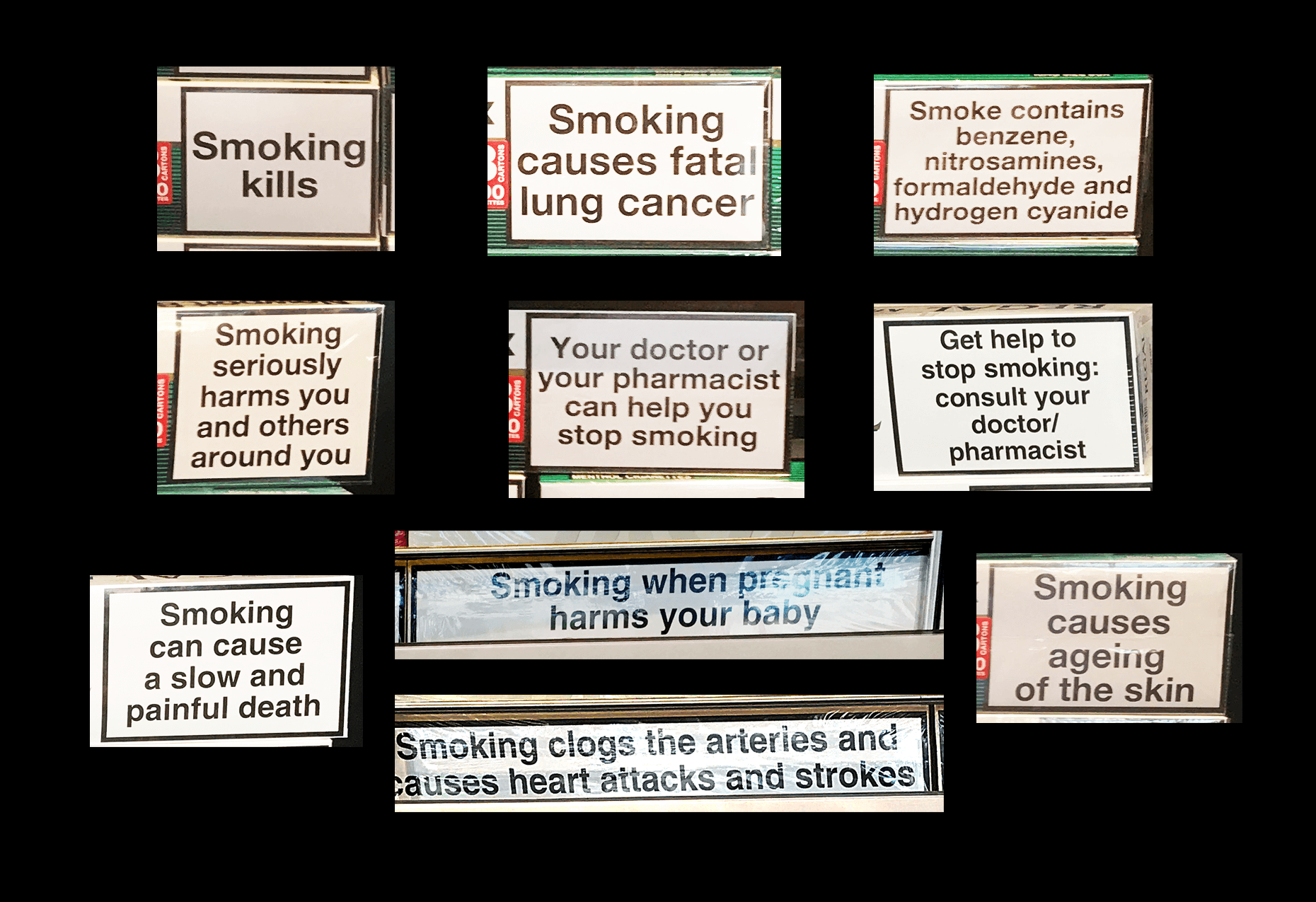
Warning labels on cigarette cartons in St Maarten, Dutch West Indies (February 2019)

==== 2001 - 2016 ====
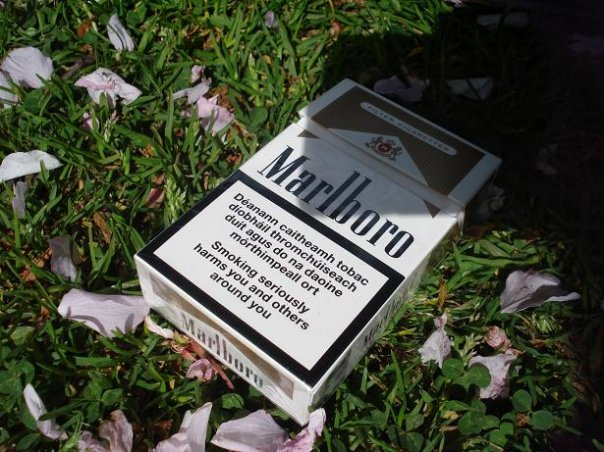
Packet of Irish cigarettes, complete with warning

There were previously two general warnings used on the front of packaging, which took up 30% and 14 additional warnings on the rear of packaging, which took up 40%, however the sizes were increased if more than one language was present. These warnings were displayed in black Helvetica bold on a white background with a thick black border. The general warnings are:

- Smoking kills
- Smoking seriously harms you and others around you

The additional warnings were:

- Smokers die younger.
- Smoking clogs the arteries and causes heart attacks and strokes.
- Smoking causes fatal lung cancer.
- Smoking when pregnant harms your baby.
- Protect children: don't make them breathe your smoke.
- Your doctor or your pharmacist can help you stop smoking.
- Smoking is highly addictive, don't start.
- Stopping smoking reduces the risk of fatal heart and lung diseases.
- Smoking can cause a slow and painful death.
- Get help to stop smoking: (telephone/postal address/internet address/consult your doctor/pharmacist).
- Smoking may reduce the blood flow and causes impotence.
- Smoking causes ageing of the skin.
- Smoking can damage the sperm and decreases fertility.
- Smoke contains benzene, nitrosamines, formaldehyde and hydrogen cyanide.

Ireland once prefaced its warnings with "Irish Government Warning", Latvia with "Veselības ministrija brīdina" (Health Ministry Warning) and Spain with "Las autoridades sanitarias advierten" ("The Health Board Warns"). In member states with more than one official language, the warnings were displayed in all official languages, with the sizes adjusted accordingly (for example in Belgium the messages are written in Dutch, French and German, in Luxembourg in French and German and in Ireland, in Irish and English). All cigarette packets sold in the European Union used to have to display the content of nicotine, tar, and carbon monoxide in the same manner on the side of the packet, this is no longer the case.

In 2003, it was reported that sales of cigarette cases had surged, attributable to the introduction of more prominent warning labels on cigarette packs by this directive. Alternatively, people choose to hide the warnings using various "funny" stickers, such as "You could be hit by a bus tomorrow."

In 2005, the first set of pictorial warnings was introduced for the rear of packaging. There were 3 pictorial warnings for each additional warning leading to a total of 42. The adoption of pictorial warnings was not mandatory, and was first originally adopted by Belgium in 2006, followed by Romania and the United Kingdom in 2008, Latvia in 2010, Malta, France and Spain in 2011, Denmark and Hungary in 2012 and Ireland in 2013.

In 2008, an Irish primary school teacher won her High Court bid to have health warnings on cigarette packets published in Irish as well as English, as previously they were in English only.

The warnings were replaced in 2016, however a similar format continued to be used in Switzerland (until 2025) and Ukraine, with the same pictorial warnings.

==== 1989 - 2001 ====
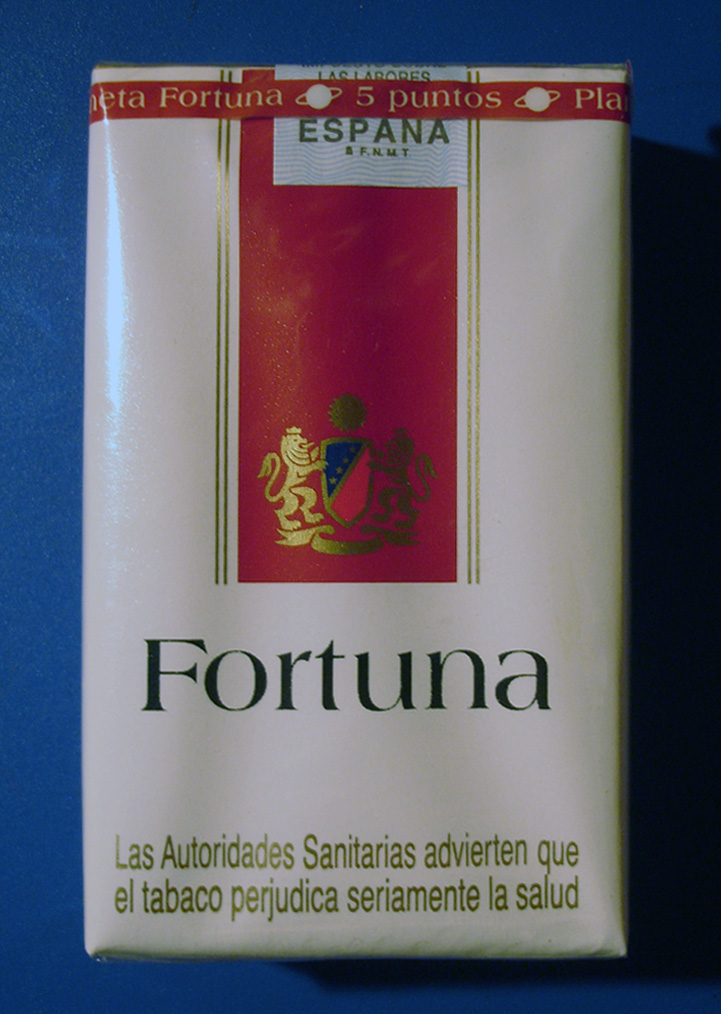
A pack of cigarettes from Spain, featuring the old warning

In 1989 the first EU-wide warnings were introduced by directive 89/622/EEC. It consisted of one general warning covering 4% of the front of packet (6% where the warnings displayed two languages and 8% where they displayed three), which was:

- Tobacco seriously damages health

The warnings at the rear were in a similar size and member states were able to choose which ones would be included on their warnings, however they must have included:

- Smoking causes cancer
- Smoking causes heart disease

They also may have included the following warnings optionally:

- Smoking causes fatal diseases.
- Smoking kills.
- Smoking can kill.
- Smoking when pregnant harms your baby.
- Protect children: don't make them breathe your smoke.
- Smoking damages the health of those around you.
- Stopping smoking reduces the risk of serious disease.
- Smoking causes cancer, chronic bronchitis and other chest diseases.
- More than (....) people die each year in (name of the country) from lung cancer.
- Every year, . . . people are killed in road accidents in (name of the country) — ... times more die from their addiction to smoking.
- Every year, addiction to smoking claims more victims than road accidents.
- Smokers die younger.
- Don't smoke if you want to stay healthy.
- Save money: stop smoking.

There were no EU-wide warnings prior to this however some member states had introduced their own warnings, such as in Finland, Ireland and Sweden, which first introduced text warnings in the 1970s.

== Georgia ==
General warning:

მოწევა კლავს
(Smoking kills)

მწეველები კვდებიან ადრე
(Smokers die younger)

Georgia introduced Plain tobacco packaging on April 1, 2025.

== Ghana ==
Warnings in Ghana are compliant with the EU's legislations, as follows:

Packaging 1 (same as in the newer UK packaging):

- Smoking seriously harms you and others around you
- Stopping smoking reduces the risk of fatal heart and lung diseases

Packaging 2 (same as in the older UK packaging):

- Smoking causes cancer
- Smoking damages the health of those around you

Packaging 3 (same as in the older UK packaging):

- Smoking causes fatal diseases
- Smokers die younger

== Honduras ==
In Honduras, warnings are stipulated by the Honduran Institute for the Prevention of Alcoholism, Drug Addiction and Drug Dependence (IHADFA).

== Hong Kong ==
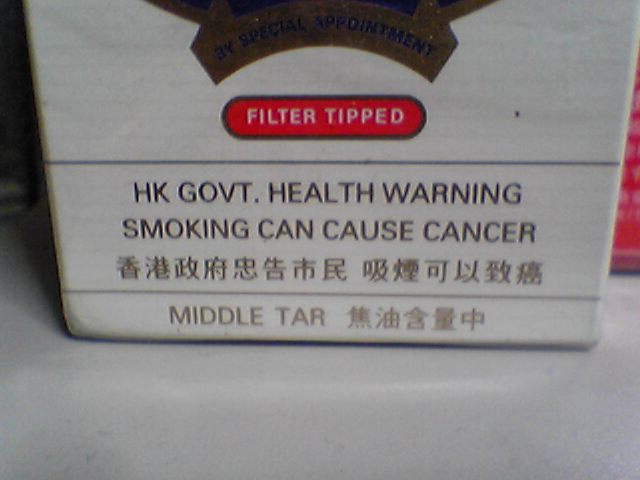
A British-era warning message

In 1983, the Smoking (Public Health) Ordinance dictated tobacco companies to print an official warning on cigarette packages by Hong Kong Government. Under Hong Kong Law, Chap 371B Smoking (Public Health) (Notices) Order, packaging must indicate the amount of nicotine and tar that is present in cigarette boxes in addition to graphics depicting different health problems caused by smoking in the size and ratio as prescribed by law. The warnings are to be published in both official languages, Traditional Chinese and English.

Every warning begins with the phrase '香港特區政府忠告市民/HKSAR GOVERNMENT WARNING' and then one of the following in all caps:

- 吸煙引致肺癌/Smoking causes lung cancer
- 吸煙足以致命/Smoking kills
- 吸煙禍及家人/Smoking harms your family
- 吸煙引致末梢血管疾病/Smoking causes peripheral vascular diseases
- 吸煙可引致陽萎/Smoking may cause impotence
- 吸煙可加速皮膚老化/Smoking can accelerate aging of the skin

In addition, any print advertisement must give minimum 85% coverage of the following warnings:

HKSAR GOVERNMENT HEALTH WARNING

- January - February SMOKING KILLS
- March - April SMOKING CAUSES CANCER
- May - June SMOKING CAUSES HEART DISEASE
- July - August SMOKING CAUSES LUNG CANCER
- September - October SMOKING CAUSES RESPIRATORY DISEASES
- November - December SMOKING HARMS YOUR CHILDREN

In 2018, a new batch of warnings were introduced, consisting of the following warnings that cover 85% of packs:

Chinese	English
吸煙奪去我的聲線	Smoking takes away my voice
吸煙帶來痛苦，生不如死	Smoking causes suffering, not just death
吸煙引致早死	Smoking causes premature death
吸煙足以致命	I died of smoking
違例吸煙：定額罰款港幣1,500元	Smoking offence: fixed penalty HK$1,500
吸煙引致陽萎	Smoking causes impotence
吸煙引致衰老	Smoking causes ageing
吸煙引致末梢血管疾病	Smoking causes peripheral vascular diseases
吸煙引致中風	Smoking causes strokes
吸煙引致心臟病	Smoking causes heart disease
吸煙禍及子女	Smoking harms your children
吸煙引致肺癌	Smoking causes lung cancer

== Iceland ==
All cigarette packets and other tobacco packaging in Iceland must include warnings in the same size and format as in the European Union and using the same approved texts in Icelandic.

General warning:

Reykingar drepa

These warnings are also used:

- Læknirinn þinn eða lyfjafræðingur geta hjálpað þér að hætta að reykja. (Your doctor or pharmacist can help you quit smoking)
- Reykingar valda krabbameini. (Smoking causes cancer)
- Reykingar eru mjög skaðlegar fyrir þig og þá sem eru nálægt þér. (Smoking is very harmful to you and those close to you)
- Reykingar stífla slagæðar og valda kransæðastíflu og heilablóðfalli. (Smoking blocks your arteries and causes coronary artery disease and strokes)
- Reykingar valda banvænu krabbameini í lungum. (Smoking causes fatal lung cancer)
- Reykingar á meðgöngu skaða barnið þitt. (Smoking during pregnancy harms your child)
- Verndaðu börnin – Láttu þau ekki anda að sér tókbaksreyk. (Protect children – Don't let them inhale tobacco smoke)

== India ==
In India, health warnings were introduced in 1975.

Cigarette packets sold in India are required to carry graphical and textual health warnings. The warning must cover at least 85% of the surface of the pack, of which 60% must be pictorial and the remaining 25% contains textual warnings in English, Hindi or any other Indian language.

In 2003, India ratified the World Health Organisation's Framework Convention on Tobacco Control, which includes a recommendation for large, clear health warnings on tobacco packages. However, there was a delay in implementing graphic warning labels.

Until 2008, cigarette packets sold in India were required to carry a written warning on the front of the packet with the text CIGARETTE SMOKING IS INJURIOUS TO HEALTH in English. Paan, gutkha and khaini packets carried the warning TOBACCO IS INJURIOUS TO HEALTH in Hindi and English. The law later changed. According to the new law, cigarette packets were required to carry pictorial warnings of a skull or scorpion along with the text SMOKING KILLS and TOBACCO CAUSES MOUTH CANCER in Hindi and English.

English

Smoking kills – Tobacco causes cancer

Hindi

धूम्रपान जानलेवा है

The Cigarette and Other Tobacco Products (Packaging and Labelling) Rules 2008 requiring graphic health warnings came into force on 31 May 2008. Under the law, all tobacco products were required to display graphic pictures, such as pictures of diseased lungs, and the text SMOKING KILLS or TOBACCO KILLS in English, covering at least 40% of the front of the pack, and retailers must display the cigarette packs in such a way that the pictures on pack are clearly visible. In January 2012, controversy arose when it was discovered that an image of former English footballer John Terry was used on a warning label.

On 15 October 2014, Union Health Minister Harsh Vardhan announced that only 15% of the surface of a pack of cigarettes could contain branding, and that the rest must be used for graphic and text health warnings. The Union Ministry of Health amended the Cigarettes and Other Tobacco Products (Packaging and Labelling) Rules, 2008 to enforce the changes effective from 1 April 2015.

However, the government decision to increase pictorial warnings on tobacco packets from 1 April was put on hold indefinitely, following the recommendations of a Parliamentary committee, which reportedly did not speak to health experts but only to tobacco lobby representatives. On 5 April 2016, the health ministry ordered government agencies to enforce this new rule.

Following the intervention by the Parliamentary committee, NGO Health of Millions, represented by Prashant Bhushan, filed a petition in the Supreme Court of India, which asked the government to stop selling of loose cigarettes and publish bigger health warnings on tobacco packs.

== Indonesia ==
In Indonesia, health warnings were introduced in 1991.

=== May 1991–December 1999 ===
PERINGATAN PEMERINTAH: MEROKOK DAPAT MERUGIKAN KESEHATAN
Government warning: Smoking can be harmful to health.

=== January 2000–December 2013 ===
With the enforcement of the Indonesian Government Regulation No. 19 (2003) on Cigarette Safety for Health, a new warning was implemented:

MEROKOK DAPAT MENYEBABKAN KANKER, SERANGAN JANTUNG, IMPOTENSI DAN GANGGUAN KEHAMILAN DAN JANIN
Smoking can cause cancer, heart attacks, impotence and pregnancy and fetal disorders.

The last recorded usage of this warning in TV advertisements was an Esse Mild advertisement from late February 2014.

=== December 2013–December 2018 ===
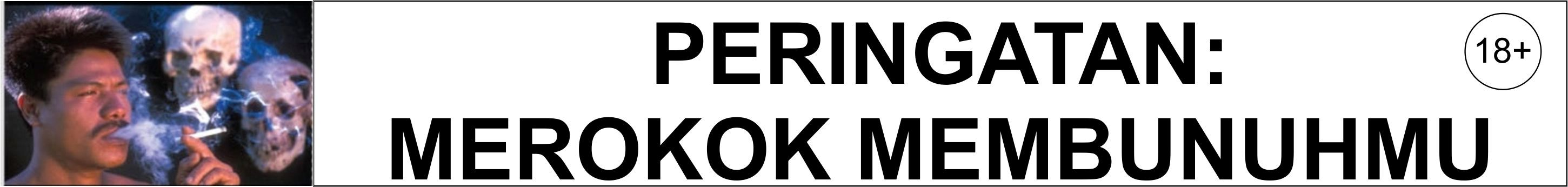
The general warning used until 2018

PERINGATAN: MEROKOK MEMBUNUHMU
Warning: Smoking kills you

With the enforcement of the Indonesian Government Regulation No. 109 (2012) on Safeguarding Materials Containing Addictive Substances in the Form of Tobacco Products for Health, all tobacco products/cigarette packaging and advertisement should include warning images and age restriction (18+). Graphic warnings must cover 40% of cigarette packages. After the introduction of graphic images in Indonesian cigarette packaging, the branding of cigarettes as "light", "mild", "filter", etc. is forbidden, except for brands that already use some words above such as L.A. Lights, A Mild or Dunhill Filter. However, the last advertisement to use this warning was a 2021 Djarum Super advertisement, before it subsequently used the 2018 warning.

Other alternatives:

- PERINGATAN: MEROKOK SEBABKAN KANKER MULUT (Warning: Smoking causes mouth cancer)
- PERINGATAN: MEROKOK SEBABKAN KANKER TENGGOROKAN (Warning: Smoking causes throat cancer)
- PERINGATAN: MEROKOK DEKAT ANAK BERBAHAYA BAGI MEREKA (Warning: Smoking endangers children near you)
- PERINGATAN: MEROKOK SEBABKAN KANKER PARU-PARU DAN BRONKITIS KRONIS (Warning: Smoking causes lung cancer and chronic bronchitis)

These warnings below appear on the side of cigarette packaging:

- DILARANG MENJUAL/MEMBERI PADA ANAK USIA DI BAWAH 18 TAHUN DAN PEREMPUAN HAMIL (Do not sell or give [this product] to children under 18 years old and pregnant women)
- Optional: TIDAK ADA BATAS AMAN! MENGANDUNG LEBIH DARI 4.000 ZAT KIMIA BERBAHAYA, 43 ZAT PENYEBAB KANKER (There is no safe limit! Contains more than 4,000 hazardous chemicals and 43 carcinogens)

=== January 2019–September 2024 ===
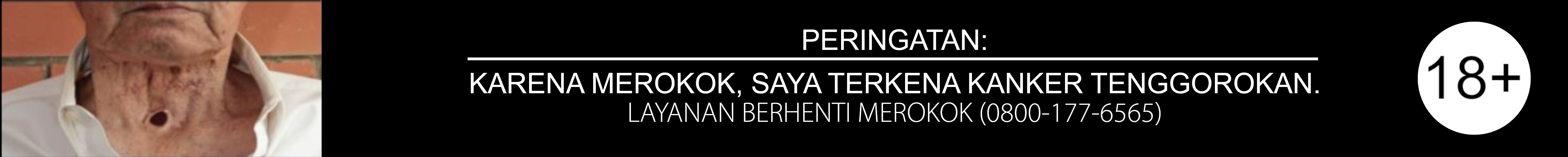
General warning used between January 2019 and August 2024

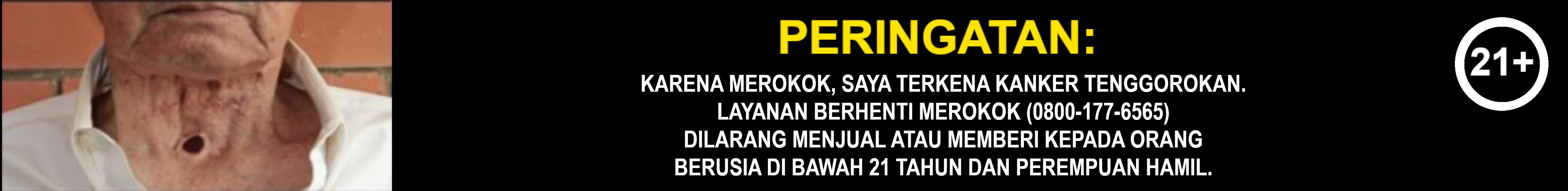
General warning used since August 2024

PERINGATAN: KARENA MEROKOK, SAYA TERKENA KANKER TENGGOROKAN. LAYANAN BERHENTI MEROKOK (0800-177-6565)
Warning: Because of smoking, I now have throat cancer. Smoking quitline: 0800-177-6565

After it was revealed that the pictorial warnings used in Indonesia originally came from the 2005 warnings of Thailand, on 31 May 2018, the Ministry of Health launched new pictorial health warnings, of which two depict Indonesian smokers and one depicts a smoker from Venezuela.

Other alternatives:

- PERINGATAN: MEROKOK SEBABKAN KANKER MULUT (Warning: Smoking causes mouth cancer)
- PERINGATAN: MEROKOK SEBABKAN KANKER PARU (Warning: Smoking causes lung cancer)
- PERINGATAN: ROKOK MERENGGUT KEBAHAGIAAN SAYA SATU PERSATU (Warning: One by one, cigarettes took my happiness away)
- PERINGATAN: MEROKOK SEBABKAN KANKER TENGGOROKAN (Warning: Smoking causes throat cancer)
- DILARANG MENJUAL/MEMBERI PADA ANAK USIA DI BAWAH 18 TAHUN DAN PEREMPUAN HAMIL (Do not sell or give [this product] to children under 18 years old and pregnant women) (from January 2019 until August 2024)
- DILARANG MENJUAL DAN MEMBERI KEPADA ORANG DI BAWAH 21 TAHUN DAN PEREMPUAN HAMIL (Do not sell and distribute to people under 21 and pregnant women) (since August 2024)

== Iran ==
Iran mandates pictorial warnings on all tobacco packages. General warning:

ترک سیگار موجب سلامتی و افزایش طول عمر میشود
Quitting smoking makes you healthier and increases your life expectancy.

== Japan ==
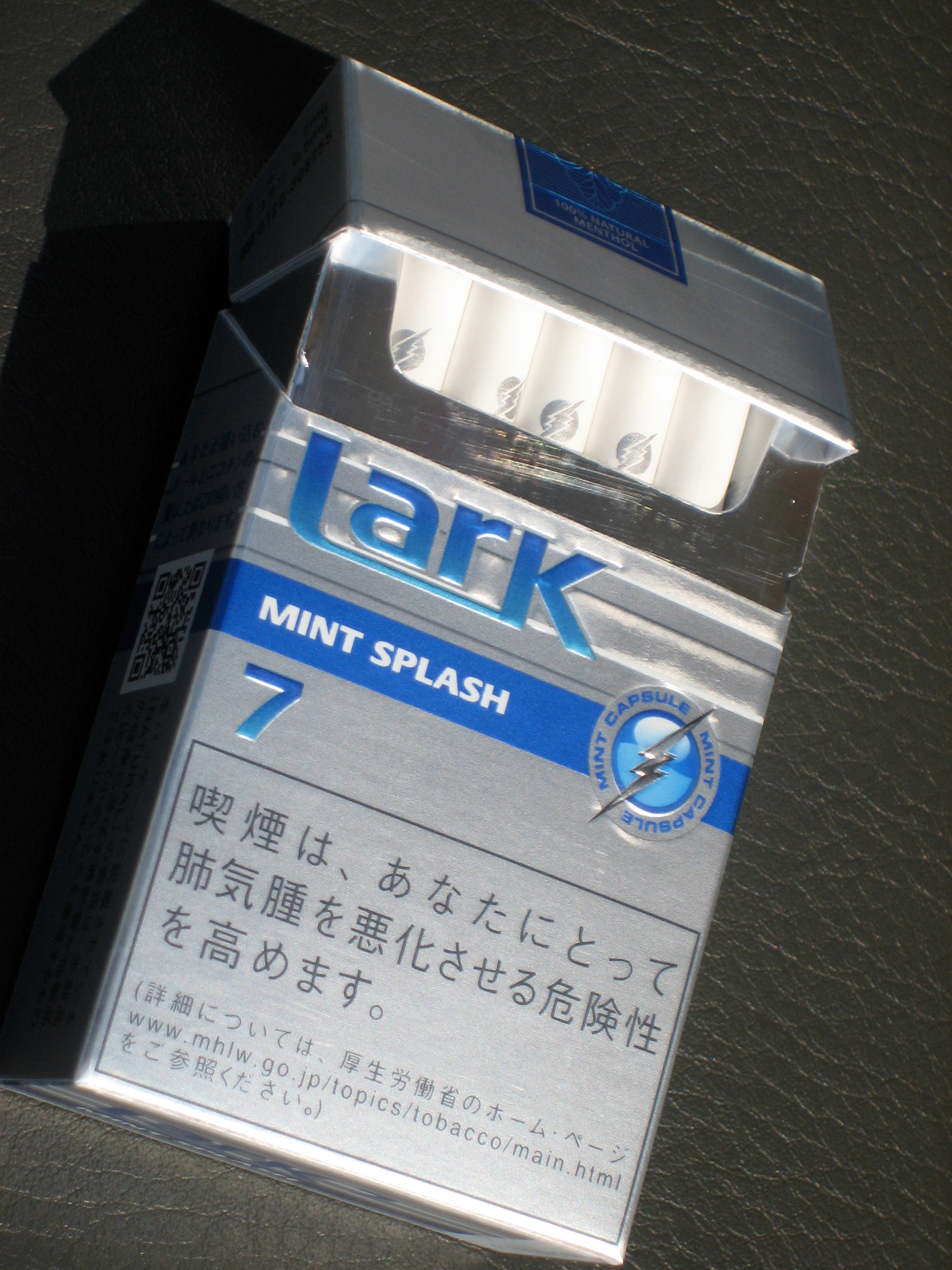
A cigarette package in Japan with a warning message

In 1972, Japan became the first country in Asia to display a general warning on cigarette packages.

Prior to 2005, there was only one warning on all Japanese cigarette packages.

- 健康のため吸いすぎに注意しましょう (For the good of your health, be careful not to smoke too much) (1972–1989)
- あなたの健康を損なうおそれがありますので吸いすぎに注意しましょう (Be careful not to smoke too much, as there is a risk of damaging your health) (1990–2005)

Since 2005, more than one general warning is printed on cigarette packaging.

On the front of cigarette packages:

- 喫煙は、あなたにとって肺がんの原因の一つとなります。疫学的な推計によると、喫煙者は肺がんにより死亡する危険性が非喫煙者に比べて約2倍から4倍高くなります。 (Smoking is a cause of lung cancer. According to epidemiological estimates, smokers are about two to four times more likely than non-smokers to die of lung cancer.)
- 喫煙は、あなたにとって心筋梗塞の危険性を高めます。疫学的な推計によると、喫煙者は心筋梗塞により死亡する危険性が非喫煙者に比べて約1.7倍高くなります。 (Smoking increases risk of myocardial infarctions. According to epidemiological estimates, smokers are about 1.7 times more likely than non-smokers to die of a heart attack.)
- 喫煙は、あなたにとって脳卒中の危険性を高めます。疫学的な推計によると、喫煙者は脳卒中により死亡する危険性が非喫煙者に比べて約1.7倍高くなります。 (Smoking increases risk of strokes. According to epidemiological estimates, smokers are about 1.7 times more likely than non-smokers to die of a stroke.)
- 喫煙は、あなたにとって肺気腫を悪化させる危険性を高めます。 (Smoking can aggravate the symptoms of emphysema.)

On the back of cigarette packages:

- 妊娠中の喫煙は、胎児の発育障害や早産の原因の一つとなります。疫学的な推計によると、たばこを吸う妊婦は、吸わない妊婦に比べ、低出生体重の危険性が約2倍、早産の危険性が約3倍高くなります。（詳細については、厚生労働省のホーム・ページ www.mhlw.go.jp/topics/tobacco/main.html をご参照ください。） (Smoking during pregnancy is a cause of premature births and impaired fetal growth. According to epidemiological estimates, pregnant women who smoke have almost double the risk of low birth weight and three times the risk of premature births than pregnant women who do not smoke. (For more information, please visit the Ministry of Health home page at www.mhlw.go.jp/topics/tobacco/main.html.))
- たばこの煙は、あなたの周りの人、特に乳幼児、子供、お年寄りなどの健康に悪影響を及ぼします。喫煙の際には、周りの人の迷惑にならないように注意しましょう。 (Tobacco smoke adversely affects the health of people around you, especially infants, children and the elderly. When smoking, be careful not to annoy others.)
- 人により程度は異なりますが、ニコチンにより喫煙への依存が生じます。 (The degree may differ from person to person, but nicotine [in cigarettes] causes addiction to smoking.)
- 未成年者の喫煙は、健康に対する悪影響やたばこへの依存をより強めます。周りの人から勧められても決して吸ってはいけません。 (Smoking while underage heightens the addiction and damage to health caused by cigarettes. Never smoke, even if encouraged to by those around you.)

== Laos ==
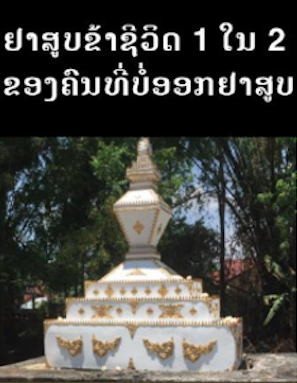
"Tobacco kills one in two smokers who don't quit"

Laos introduced graphical warnings in 2016. Eight years later, these warnings were updated, one of which depicts a traditional Lao stupa grave accompanied by the message "Tobacco kills one in two smokers who don't quit".

== Malaysia ==
In Malaysia, a general warning was used between 1976 and 2009: AMARAN OLEH KERAJAAN MALAYSIA: MEROKOK MEMBAHAYAKAN KESIHATAN (Warning from the Government of Malaysia: Smoking endangers health).

Graphic images on cigarette packs were introduced in June 2009 to show the adverse long-term effects of excessive smoking, replacing the general warning with text describing said images printed in Malay (front) and English (back) explaining:

- (in Malay) "Amaran: Rokok penyebab ..."
- (in English) "Warning: Cigarettes cause ..."

Graphic warnings must cover 40% of the front of cigarette packages and 60% of the back. The branding of cigarettes as "light", "mild", etc. is also forbidden.

== Maldives ==
In the Maldives, products containing tobacco are required by law to have (in Dhivehi):

At the front and back:

- A health warning eg. Smoking gives you a painful death (Dhivehi: ދުންފަތުން ލިބޭނީ ވޭންދެނިވި މަރެއް)
- A cessation message eg. Stop quickly! (Dhivehi: އަވަހަށް ހުއްޓާލާ!)
- A graphic image eg. cut open body showing lung cancer
- Description of the image

On the sides:

- Explanatory message of complications caused by tobacco eg. Tobacco contains 250 poisonous chemicals. These poisons damage vital organs of the body, causing cancer, stroke, lung damage, and other such painful illnesses. (Dhivehi: ދުންފަތުގައި 250 ވިހަ ކެމިކަލް ހިމެނެއެވެ. މި ވިހަތައް ހަށިގަނޑުގެ މުހިންމު ގުނަވަންތަކަށް ގެއްލުންދީ، ކެންސަރާއި، ސްޓްރޯކާއި، ފުއްޕާމޭ ހަލާކުވުން ފަދަ ވޭންދެނިވި ބަލިތައް ޖައްސައެވެ.)
- A message Get help from a health professional to save yourself! (Dhivehi: ސަލާމަތް ވުމަށް ޞިއްޙީ ފަންނު ވެރިއެއްގެ އެހީތެރިކަން ހޯދާ!)

== Mexico ==
Since 2010, cigarette packs in Mexico must contain health warnings and graphic images. By law, 30% of the pack's front, 100% of the pack's rear and 100% of one lateral must consist on images and warnings. The Secretariat of Health issues new warnings and images every six months. Images have included a dead rat, a partial mastectomy, a laryngectomy, a dead human fetus surrounded by cigarette butts, a woman being fed after suffering a stroke and damaged lungs, amongst others.

Warnings include smoking-related diseases and statistics, toxins found in cigarettes and others.

Mexico became the first country to put a warning on cigarette packs that tobacco use could increase the risk of COVID-19 infection.

== Moldova ==
General warning (on the front of cigarette packages, covering at least 30% of the area, Helvetica font):

- "Fumatul ucide" (Smoking kills) or
- "Fumatul dăunează grav sănătăţii dumneavoastră şi a celor din jur" (Smoking seriously harms you and those around);

Additional warnings (on the back of cigarette packages, covering at least 40% of the area, Helvetica font):

- "Fumătorii mor mai tineri" (Smokers die younger);
- "Fumatul blochează arterele şi provoacă infarct miocardic şi accident vascular cerebral" (Smoking clogs the arteries and causes heart attacks and strokes);
- "Fumatul conduce la moarte de cancer pulmonar" (Smoking causes death from lung cancer);
- "Fumatul în timpul sarcinii dăunează copilului dumneavoastră" (Smoking while pregnant harms your baby);
- "Protejaţi copiii dumneavoastră de inspirarea fumului de ţigaretă" (Protect your children from breathing in the cigarette smoke);
- "Psihologul, profesorul sau medicul vă poate ajuta să renunţaţi la fumat" (Psychologists, professors and doctors can help you quit smoking);
- "Fumatul creează dependenţă rapidă, nu încercaţi să fumaţi" (Smoking becomes addictive fast, try not to smoke);
- "Abandonarea fumatului reduce riscul de îmbolnăviri cardiace sau pulmonare fatale" (Quitting smoking reduces the risk of fatal heart and lung diseases);
- "Fumatul poate provoca o moarte lentă şi dureroasă" (Smoking can cause a slow and painful death);
- "Fumatul reduce circulaţia sîngelui şi provoacă impotenţă" (Smoking reduces blood circulation and increases impotency);
- "Fumatul provoacă îmbolnăvirea tenului (pielei)" (Smoking causes skin diseases);
- "Fumatul creează grave disfuncţii sexuale" (Smoking causes serious sexual dysfunction);

Regulated by "Lege cu privire la tutun şi la articolele din tutun" (Law on tobacco and tobacco articles) nr. 278-XVI from 14.12.2007 enabled at 07.03.2008

There is no such rule in Transnistria, where cigarette packages have variable warning labels depending on where they come from.

== New Zealand ==
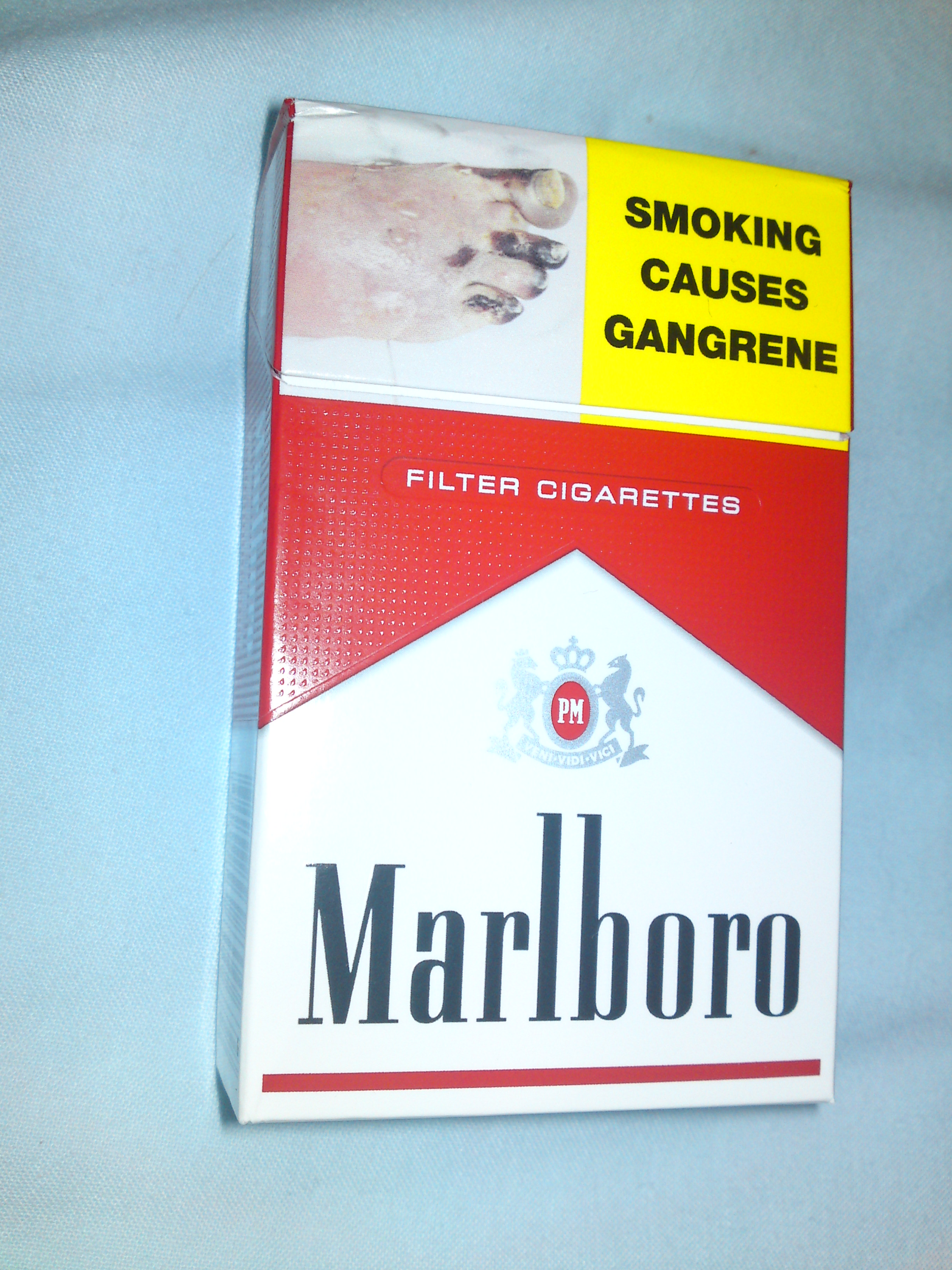
The front of a 20 pack of Marlboro Red cigarettes sold in New Zealand in 2010.

The first health warnings appeared on cigarette packets in New Zealand in 1974. Warning images accompanying text have been required to appear on each packet since 28 February 2008. New regulations were made on 14 March 2018 which provided for larger warnings and a new schedule of images and messages.

By law, 75% of a pack's front and 100% of its rear must consist of warning messages. Images include gangrenous toes, rotting teeth and gums, diseased lungs and smoking-damaged hearts. Cigarette packets also carry the New Zealand Quitline logo and phone number and other information about quitting smoking.

In total, there are fourteen different warnings. A full list with pictures is available at the New Zealand Ministry of Health's website. Warning messages are rotated annually. The following is a list of the warnings in English and Māori.

- Smoking causes heart attacks – KA PĀ MAI NGĀ MANAWA-HĒ I TE KAI PAIPA
- Smoking causes over 80% of lung cancers – NEKE ATU I TE 80% O NGĀ MATE PUKUPUKU KI NGĀ PŪKAHUKAHU I AHU MAI I TE KAI PAIPA
- Smoking harms your baby before it is born – KA TŪKINOHIA TŌ PĒPI I TO KŌPŪ I TE KAI PAIPA
- Your smoking harms others – KA TŪKINOHIA ĒTAHI ATU I Ō MAHI KAI PAIPA
- Smoking is a major cause of stroke – KA PIKI AKE I TE KAI PAIPA TŌ TŪPONO KI TE IKURA RORO
- Smoking damages your blood vessels – KA TŪKINOHIA Ō IA TOTO I TE KAI PAIPA
- Smoking is not attractive – KA ANUANU KOE I TE KAI PAIPA
- Smoking causes heart attacks – KA PĀ MAI NGĀ MANAWA-HĒ I TE KAI PAIPA
- Smoking causes lung cancer – KA PĀ MAI TE MATE PUKUPUKU KI NGĀ PŪKAHUKAHU I TE KAI PAIPA
- Smoking when pregnant harms your baby – KA TŪKINOHIA TŌ PĒPI I TE KAI PAIPA I A KOE E HAPŪ ANA
- Your smoking harms children – KA TŪKINOHIA NGĀ TAMARIKI I Ō MAHI KAI PAIPA
- Smoking is a major cause of stroke – KA PIKI AKE I TE KAI PAIPA TŌ TŪPONO KI TE IKURA RORO
- Quit before it is too late – ME WHAKAMUTU KEI RIRO KOE
- Smoking causes gum disease and stinking breath – KA PĀ TE MATE PŪNIHO, KA HAUNGA TŌ HĀ I TE KAI PAIPA

== Nigeria ==
Six warnings existed prior to 2013:

- Smoking is addictive
- Smoking damages lungs
- Smoking can kill
- Smoking can cause cancer
- Smoking can damage the fetus

From 2013 onwards, the general warning in Nigeria is: The Federal Ministry of Health warns that smokers are liable to die young.

== North Korea ==
North Korea signed the WHO Framework Convention on Tobacco Control on 17 June 2003 and ratified it on 27 April 2005. Warnings are required on all types of packaging, but their appearance is not regulated in any way. They usually state that smoking is harmful to health. However, nicotine and tar content listed must not be misleading and do need to be approved by local authorities. Graphic warning images that are now common worldwide have never appeared on packaging in North Korea.

== Norway ==
A warning in Norwegian (bokmål)

Norway has had general warnings on cigarette packets since 1975. Norway's warnings of today were introduced in 2003 and are in line with the European Union's legislation, as Norway is an EEA member:

On the front of cigarette and cigar packages, covering about 30% of the area:

- Røyking dreper (Smoking kills)
- Røyking er svært skadelig for deg og dine omgivelser (Smoking is very harmful to you and your surroundings)

On the back of cigarette and cigar packages, covering about 45% of the area:

- Røyking fører til dødeleg lungekreft (Smoking causes fatal lung cancer)
- Hvis du slutter å røyke vil du minske risikoen for dødelige hjerte- og lungesykdommer (If you stop smoking, you will reduce the risk of fatal heart and lung diseases)
- Røyking fører til tidleg aldring av huda (Smoking causes early ageing of the skin)
- Røyking kan redusere blodgjennomstrømminga og føre til impotens (Smoking may reduce the blood flow and cause impotence)
- Røyking kan føre til ein langsam og smertefull død (Smoking can cause a slow and painful death)
- Røyking kan redusere sædkvaliteten og minske fruktbarheten (Smoking can reduce sperm quality and decrease fertility)
- Vern barn mot tobakksrøyk, ikke la dem puste inn din røyk (Protect children against smoke, don't let them inhale your smoke)
- Røyking er sterkt avhengighetsskapende: Ikke begynn å røyke (Smoking is highly addictive: Don't start smoking)
- Røyking fører til forkalking av årene og forårsakar hjarteinfarkt og slag (Smoking clogs the arteries and causes heart attacks and strokes)
- Din lege eller ditt apotek kan hjelpe deg med røykeslutt (Your doctor or your pharmacy can help you stop smoking)
- Få hjelp til røykeslutt – ring Røyketelefonen 800 400 85 (Get help to stop smoking – call the Quitline: 800 400 85)
- Røyking nedsetter levealderen (Smoking lowers life expectancy)
- Røyking under graviditeten skader barnet (Smoking during pregnancy harms the child)
- Røyk inneholder benzen, nitrosaminer, formaldehyd og blåsyre (Smoke contains benzene, nitrosamines, formaldehyde and hydrogen cyanide)

Tobacco products like snus and chewing tobacco have the following warning printed on them:

- Denne tobakksvaren kan være helseskadelig og er avhengighetsskapende (This tobacco product may be a health hazard and is addictive)

== Pakistan ==
All cigarette packages in Pakistan are required by Statutory Order 1219(I)/2008 dated 25 September 2008, published in The Gazette of Pakistan dated 24 November 2008, to carry rotating health warnings from 1 July 2009.

Each health warning is printed for a period of 6 months, covering at least 30% on both sides of the packet and must be printed in Urdu at the front and English at the back. The warnings in English currently in use are:

- Protect children, don't let them breathe your smoke – Ministry of Health
- Smoking causes mouth and throat cancer – Ministry of Health
- Quit smoking and live a longer life – Ministry of Health
- Smoking severely harms you and the people around you – Ministry of Health

== Paraguay ==
The Paraguay Ministry of Public Health and Social Welfare requires cigarette packages to have graphic images and text warnings in both Spanish and Guaraní covering at least 40% of both main faces. Additionally, 100% of one of the sides must have detailed information as to the content of the cigarettes.

== Philippines ==
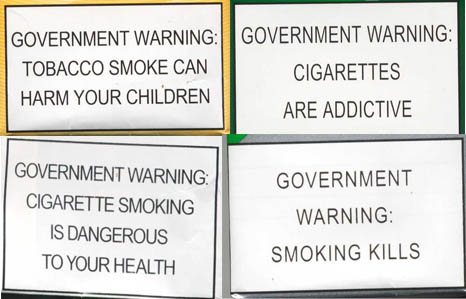
Tobacco packaging warning messages on cigarette packs sold in the Philippines prior to March 2016

All cigarette packaging sold in the Philippines are required to display a government warning label. The warnings include:

- Government Warning: Cigarette smoking is dangerous to your health.
- Government Warning: Cigarettes are addictive.
- Government Warning: Tobacco smoke can harm your children.
- Government Warning: Smoking kills.

In July 2014, President Benigno Aquino III signed the Republic Act 10643, or "An Act to Effectively Instill Health Consciousness through Graphic Health Warnings on Tobacco Products", more known as the "Graphic Health Warning Act." This law requires tobacco product packaging to display pictures of the ill effects of smoking, occupying the bottom half of the display area in both front and the back side of the packaging. On 3 March 2016, Department of Health (DOH) secretary Janette Garin started the implementation of Republic Act 10643, requiring tobacco manufacturers to include graphic health warnings on newer cigarette packaging.

With the Graphic Health Warning Act implemented, graphic health warnings are used on all newer cigarette packages and older packages using text-only warnings are required to be replaced by newer ones incorporating graphic warnings. The 12 new warnings, showing photos of negative effects of smoking, like mouth cancer, impotence and gangrene are rotated every two years, and on 3 November 2016, all cigarette packaging without graphic health warning messages are banned from sale. Labeling of cigarettes with "light" or "mild" is also forbidden by the Graphic Health Warning Act.

== Russia ==
In Russia, warning messages have existed since the late 1970s, when the Soviet Union stipulated that the message "The USSR Ministry of Health warns: Smoking is dangerous to your health" be printed in Russian on the front (as Минздрав СССР предупреждает: КУРЕНИЕ ОПАСНО ДЛЯ ВАШЕГО ЗДОРОВЬЯ) and the language of each respective republic on the back of cigarette packages.

Warning messages on Russian cigarette packets
Type of warning	Message	English translation
Main	Минздрав предупреждает: Курение вредит Вашему здоровью	The Ministry of Public Health warns: Smoking harms your health
Additional	Курение – причина раковых заболеваний	Smoking – the cause of cancerous illnesses
Additional	Курение – причина смертельных заболеваний	Smoking – the cause of deadly illnesses
Additional	Оградите детей от табачного дыма	Keep children away from tobacco smoke
Additional	Курение табака вызывает никотиновую зависимость	Smoking tobacco causes nicotine addiction
Additional	Курение – причина заболеваний сердца	Smoking – the cause of heart diseases

The warnings were revised in 2010 with pictorial depictions of tobacco-related harms, falling in line with European Union standards.

Changes to warnings
Obverse	Reverse	General warning
Text warnings cover 30% of surface	Pictorial warnings cover 50% of surface	Курение убивает (Smoking kills)

12 different variants are used.

== Serbia ==
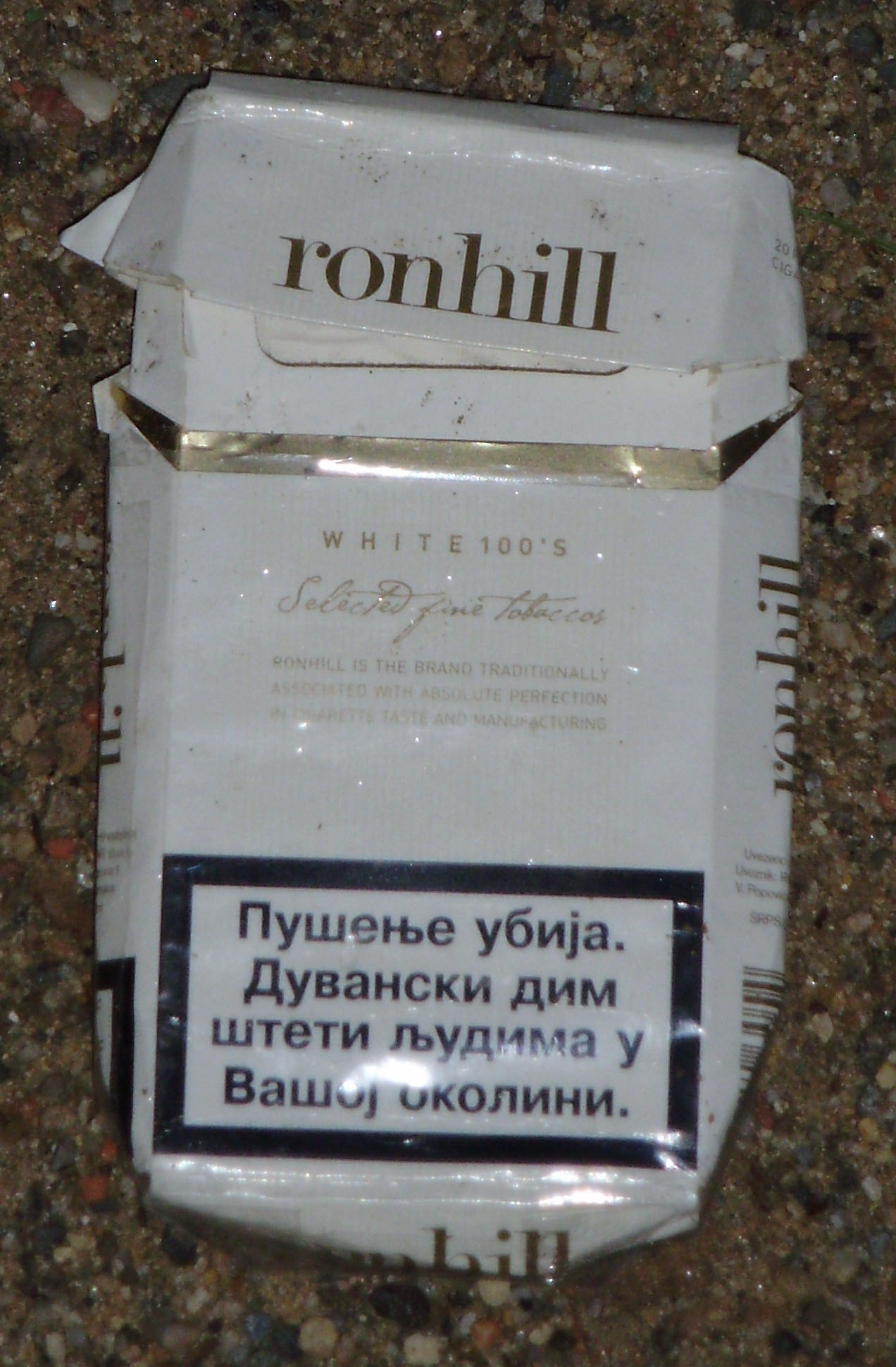
A Serbian cigarette pack with a warning

The warning messages cigarette packets in Serbia are visually similar to what is used in European Union countries, but the texts used in Serbia are not translated from EU-approved texts.

Warning messages on Serbian cigarette packets
Serbian	English	Example design
Пушење убија. Дувански дим штети људима у Вашој околини.	Smoking kills. Tobacco smoke harms people around you.	Пушење убија. Дувански дим штети људима у Вашој околини.
Желите бебу? Пушење неповољно утиче на плодност код мушкараца и жена.	Want a baby? Smoking reduces fertility in men and women.	Пушење убија. Дувански дим штети људима у Вашој околини.
Пушење изазива зависност! Потражите стручну помоћ за одвикавање.	Smoking causes addiction! Seek professional help to quit the habit.	Пушење убија. Дувански дим штети људима у Вашој околини.

== Singapore ==
In 1987, Singapore began displaying blunt, straight-to-the-point text warnings like "Smoking damages your lungs" and "Smoking causes heart disease" on cigarette packets. They were replaced by graphic warnings in August 2004 bearing the following messages:

- Smoking causes a slow and painful death
- Smoking harms your family
- Tobacco smoke can kill babies
- Smoking causes strokes
- Smoking causes lung cancer
- Smoking causes mouth diseases
- Smoking causes 92% of oral cancers

These warnings were later copied by Brunei.

In 2016, the warnings were revised, with images focusing mostly on damaged organs. The following warnings show what is printed nowadays.

- Smoking causes mouth diseases
- Smoking can cause a slow and painful death
- Smoking causes lung cancer
- Smoking causes gangrene
- Smoking causes neck cancer
- Smoking harms your family

From 1 January 2009, people possessing cigarettes without the SDPC (Singapore Duty Paid Cigarettes) label will be committing an offence under the Customs and GST Acts. The law was passed to distinguish non-duty paid, contraband cigarettes from duty-paid ones.

== Somalia ==
A small warning in Somali and English is printed on Somali cigarette packages.

== South Africa ==
In South Africa, the Tobacco Products Control Act, 1993 and its amendments (1999, 2007, 2009), stipulate that a warning related to the harmful effects (health, social, or economic) of tobacco smoking, or the beneficial effects of cessation, must be placed prominently on tobacco products covering 15% of the obverse, 25% of the reverse and 20% of the sides of packs.

According to the draft Control of Tobacco Products and Electronic Delivery Systems Bill, 2018, new legislation, once enacted, will require uniform, plain-colored packaging (branding and logos prohibited) containing the brand and product name in a standard typeface and color, a warning related to the harmful effects of tobacco smoking, or beneficial effects of cessation, and a graphic image of tobacco-related harm.

Warnings related to the harmful effects of tobacco smoking on South African tobacco products
Obverse	Reverse
DANGER: SMOKING CAN KILL YOU	Tobacco smoke contains many harmful chemicals such as carbon monoxide, cyanide, nicotine and tar, which can cause disease and death. Non-smokers and ex-smokers, on average, live longer and are healthier than smokers.
DANGER: SMOKING CAUSES CANCER	Nine out of ten patients with lung cancer are smokers. Smoking also causes cancer of the lips, mouth, voicebox, food pipe and bladder. Quitting smoking reduces your risk of cancer.
DANGER: SMOKING CAUSES HEART DISEASE	Smoking is a major cause of heart attacks, strokes and blood vessel diseases. Quitting smoking reduces your risk of heart diseases.
SMOKING DAMAGES YOUR LUNGS	A morning cough and shortness of breath are signs of lung disease. It is never too late to quit. Stop smoking now and you can prevent further harm.
PREGNANT? BREASTFEEDING? YOUR SMOKING CAN HARM YOUR BABY	The babies of mothers who smoke during pregnancy are more likely to die before birth or to be born underweight. Stopping smoking before or during the first months of pregnancy reduces the risk to the baby.
WARNING: DON'T SMOKE NEAR CHILDREN	Children who live with smokers suffer more from colds, coughs, ear infections, asthma and chest disease. Protect your children from the harmful chemicals in tobacco smoke.
TOBACCO IS ADDICTIVE	Nicotine in tobacco is a drug which acts on the brain and nerves. Most smokers are dependent on nicotine, that is why they feel uncomfortable and get cravings when they go without smoking for a while.
YOUR SMOKE CAN HARM THOSE AROUND YOU	Every time you smoke, those around you smoke too. Your smoking increases their risk of lung cancer and heart disease. Stop smoking for the sake of your health and that of your family and friends.

== South Korea ==
In South Korea, general warnings on cigarette packaging have been used since 1976. The warning messages used since then have been:

- From 1976 to November 1989: 건강을 위하여 지나친 흡연을 삼갑시다 (For your health, please refrain from smoking too much)
- From December 1989 to 1996: 흡연은 폐암 등을 일으킬 수 있으며, 특히 임산부와 청소년의 건강에 해롭습니다 (Smoking may cause lung cancer and it is especially dangerous for teenagers and pregnant women)
- From 1996 to March 2005:

Front: 흡연은 폐암 등 각종 질병의 원인이 되며, 특히 임신부와 청소년의 건강에 해롭습니다 (Smoking causes lung cancer and other diseases and it is especially dangerous for teenagers and pregnant women)

Back: 19세 미만 청소년에게 판매할 수 없습니다 (It is illegal to sell cigarettes to people under 19) and additionally, 금연하면 건강해지고 장수할 수 있습니다 (You can be healthy and live longer if you quit), 흡연은 중풍과 심장병도 일으킵니다 (Smoking also causes paralysis and heart diseases), 흡연은 사랑하는 자녀의 건강도 해칩니다 (Smoking also damages your beloved children), 당신이 흡연하면 다른 사람의 건강도 해칩니다 (Smoking damages others)

- From April 2005 to April 2007:

Front: 건강을 해치는 담배 그래도 피우시겠습니까? (Smoking damages your health. Do you still want to smoke?)

Back: 19세 미만 청소년에게 판매할 수 없습니다 (It is illegal to sell cigarettes to people under 19) and additionally, 금연하면 건강해지고 장수할 수 있습니다 (You can be healthy and live longer if you quit), 흡연은 중풍과 심장병도 일으킵니다 (Smoking also causes paralysis and heart diseases), 흡연은 사랑하는 자녀의 건강도 해칩니다 (Smoking also damages your beloved children), 당신이 흡연하면 다른 사람의 건강도 해칩니다 (Smoking hurts others)

- From April 2007 to April 2009

Front, 흡연은 폐암 등 각종 질병의 원인이 되며, 특히 임신부와 청소년의 건강에 해롭습니다 (Smoking causes lung cancer and other diseases and it is especially dangerous for teenagers and pregnant women)

Back: 19세 미만 청소년에게 판매 금지! 당신 자녀의 건강을 해칩니다" (It is illegal to sell cigarettes to people under 19! It hurts your children's health)

- From April 2009 to April 2011 (a prospectus)

Front: 건강에 해로운 담배, 일단 흡연하게 되면 끊기가 매우 어렵습니다 (Smoking damages your health. Once you start smoking, it is very difficult to quit)

Back: 19세 미만 청소년에게 판매 금지! 당신 자녀의 건강을 해칩니다 (It is illegal to sell cigarettes to people under 19! It hurts your children's health)

- From December 2016, 50% of cigarette packages must contain warning elements, of which 30% must be graphic warnings. In addition to the existing warning: 흡연이 질병의 원인이 될 수 있습니다. (Smoking can be a cause of disease), the following warning will be mandatory: 흡연은 다른 사람의 건강을 위협할 수 있습니다. (Smoking can harm others' health)
- From 2017, more pictorial warnings were added to cigarette packs.

== Sri Lanka ==
Sri Lanka introduced graphic health warnings on cigarette packages in 2015. The warnings, displayed in English, Sinhalese and Tamil, cover 60% of both front and back panels.

== Switzerland ==
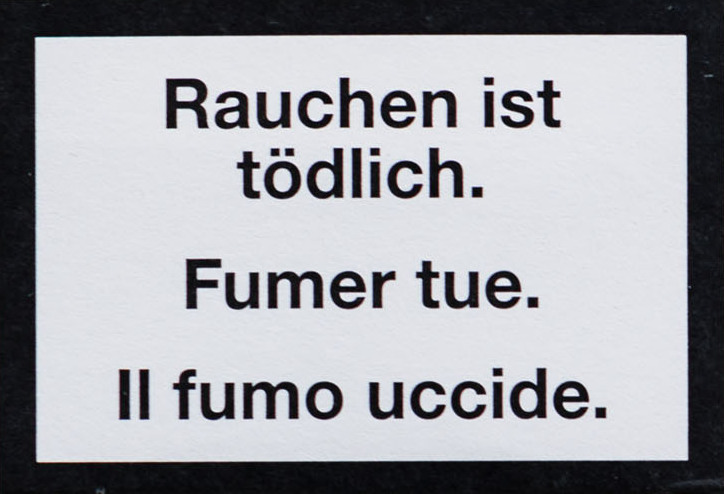
Swiss warning sign in 2017

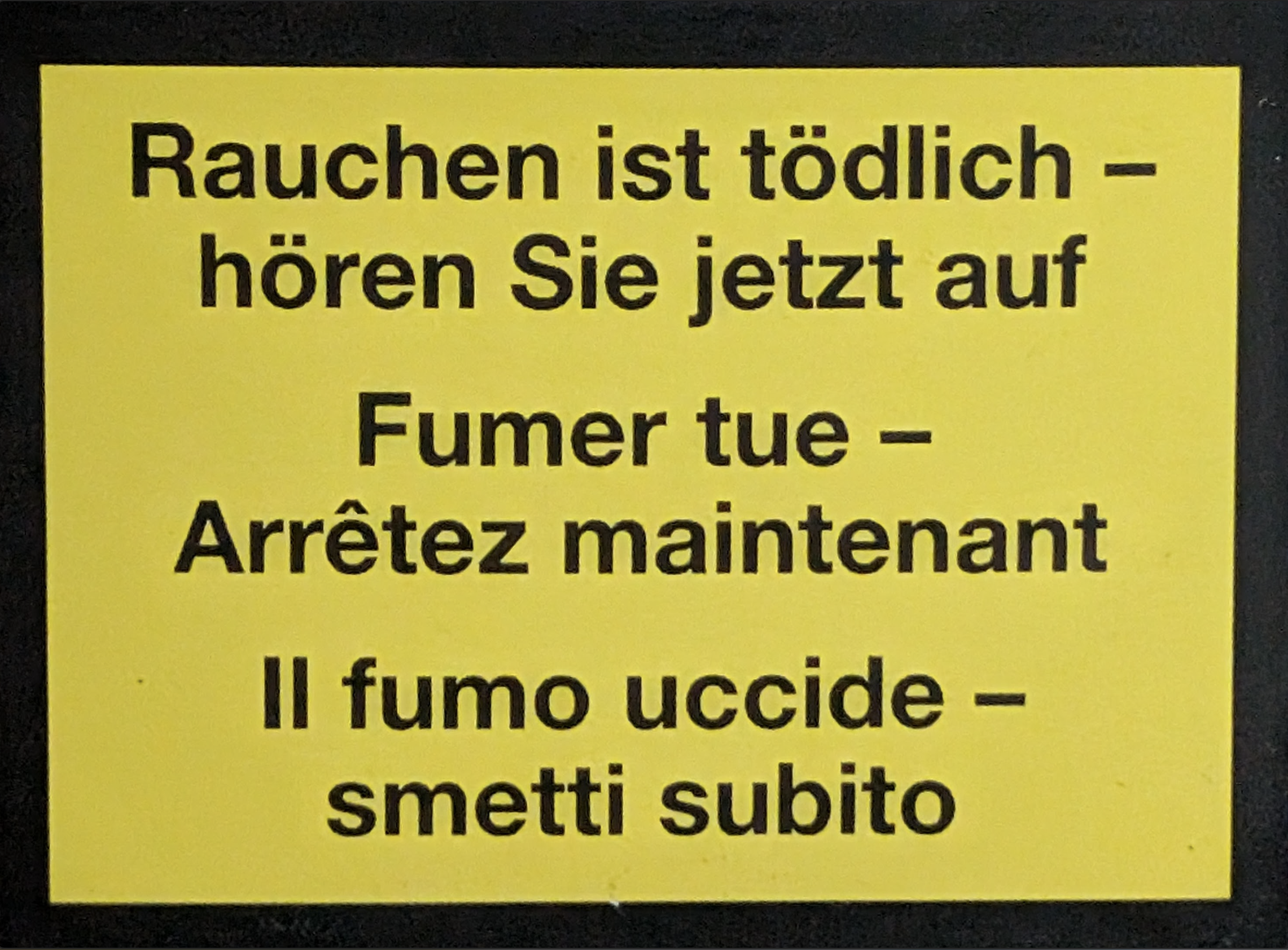
Swiss tobacco warning from 2026

Switzerland introduced health warnings on cigarette packages in 1980. They evolved over time. Since January 1, 2010, cigarettes, as well as tobacco replacement products under 1% THC, have been required to carry pictorial warnings, which are typically located only on the back of the pack. The images have been rotated every 2 years. Below the pictorial warnings are text warnings.

Switzerland has warning messages in its three official languages (German, French and Italian). The three warning messages below, all meaning "Smoking kills", were posted on cigarette packs until 2024:

- (in German) Rauchen ist tödlich.
- (in French) Fumer tue.
- (in Italian) Il fumo uccide.

Swiss rear pictorial tobacco warning (2024-)

Since October 1 2024, the Federal Act on Tobacco Products updated the warnings to "Smoking kills – stop now":

- (in German) Rauchen ist tödlich – hören Sie jetzt auf.
- (in French) Fumer tue – arrêtez maintenant.
- (in Italian) Il fumo uccide – smetti subito.

Along with these warnings, warnings for specific products such as cigarettes, cigarillos, and rolling tobacco were changed from yellow to white. Oral and heated tobacco still carry white warnings. Before the Federal Act on Tobacco Products went into effect, it was required for tobacco companies to list the amount of nicotine, tar, and carbon monoxide on cigarette packs. However, in 2024, the Federal Act on Tobacco Products specifically prohibited listing them.

== Taiwan ==
The warnings in Taiwan are led by the phrase "行政院衛生署警告" (Warning from the Department of Health, Executive Yuan:) and followed by one of the following warnings:

- 吸菸有害健康: Smoking is hazardous to your health
- 孕婦吸菸易導致胎兒早產及體重不足: Smoking during pregnancy can cause premature death and underweight birth
- 抽菸會導致肺癌﹑心臟病﹑氣腫及與懷孕有關的問題: Smoking can cause lung cancer, heart diseases, emphysema and pregnancy-related problems
- 吸菸害人害己: Smoking hurts yourself and others
- 懷孕婦女吸菸可能傷害胎兒，導致早產及體重不足: Smoking during pregnancy might damage the fetus and can cause premature death and underweight birth
- 戒菸可減少健康的危害: Quitting smoking can reduce health risks (no longer used)

The images and warnings were revised in 2014, after the Department of Health was reorganised into the Ministry of Health and Welfare. The following warnings show what is printed since 1 June 2014.

- 吸菸導致皮膚老化: Smoking causes ageing of the skin
- 菸癮困你一生: Tobacco addiction traps your life
- 吸菸會導致性功能障礙: Smoking causes sexual dysfunctions
- 菸害導致胎兒異常及早產: Smoking causes birth defects and premature birth
- 不吸菸，你可以擁有更多: You can have more if you quit smoking
- 二手菸引發兒童肺炎、中耳炎、癌症: Second hand smoking causes pneumonia, otitis media and cancer in children
- 吸菸影響口腔衛生: Smoking affects oral hygiene
- 吸菸引發自己與家人中風與心臟病: Smoking makes you and your family suffer strokes and heart diseases

Warnings of any version are accompanied with "戒煙專線: 0800-636363" (Smoking Quitline: 0800–636363).

== Thailand ==
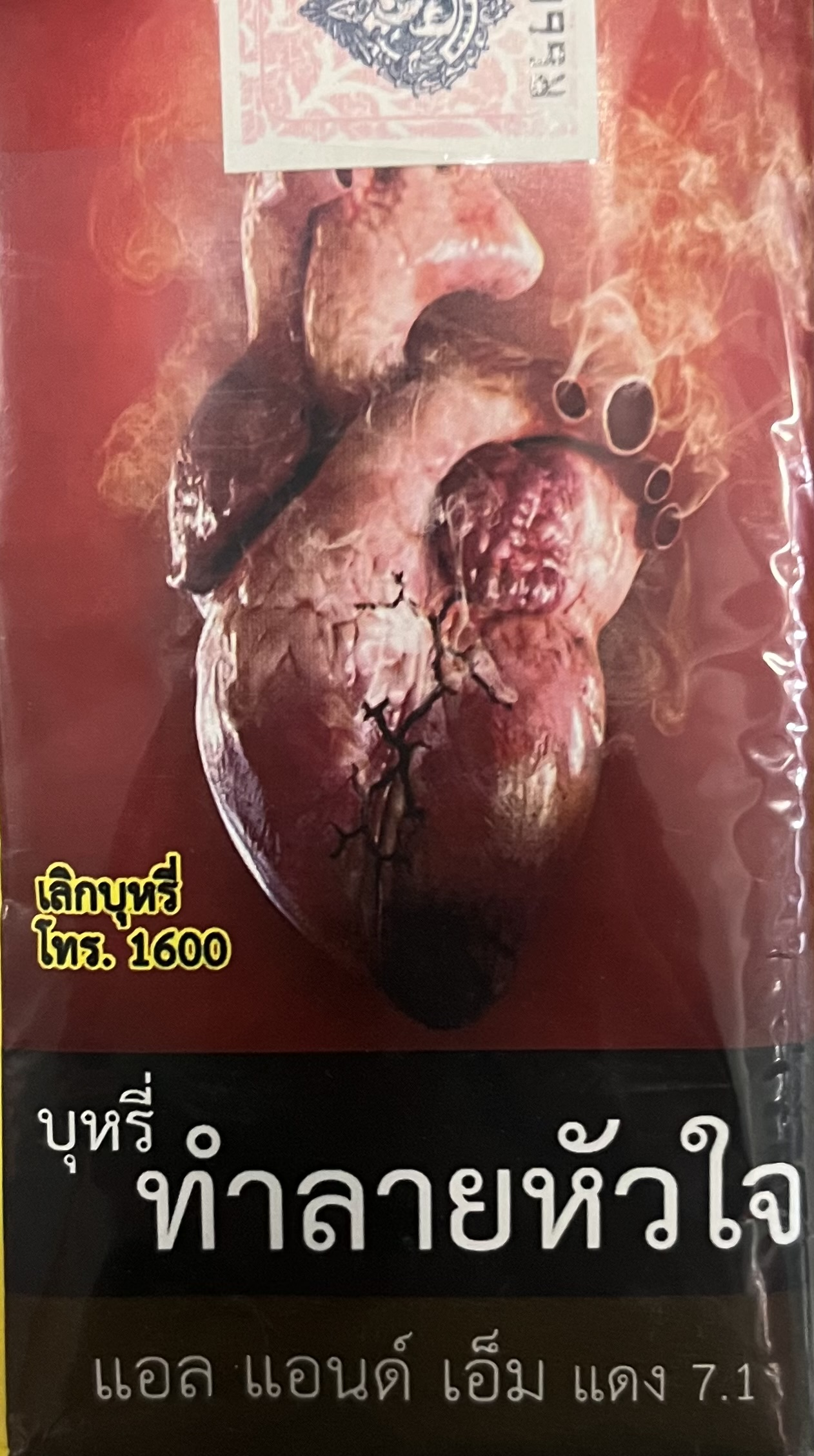
2022-series warning on an L&M Red pack

Graphic warnings have appeared on Thai cigarette packages since 25 March 2005 and underwent updates in 2006, 2009, 2010, 2014 and 2022. A recent study showed that the warnings made Thai smokers think more often about the health risks of smoking and about quitting smoking.

Thailand introduced plain packaging in 2020.

== Timor-Leste ==
Timor-Leste only used a text warning, "FUMA OHO ITA" (Smoking kills in Tetum), prior to 2018, when new pictorial warnings covering 85% of the front and 100% of the back of packages were implemented.

The warnings currently in use are:

- FUMA OHO ITA (Smoking kills), featuring a crucifix made of cigarettes on a pile of human skulls.
- FUMA KAUZA IMPOTÉNSIA (Smoking causes impotence)
- FUMA PROVOKA MORAS FUAN (Smoking can cause heart attacks)
- FUMA KAUZA ABORTU (Smoking causes abortions)
- FUMA PROVOKA KANKRU (Smoking can cause cancer)
- FUMA KAUZA PULMAUN KRONIKU (Smoking causes chronic lung disease)
- Konsulta atu para fuma – Numero telf: 113 (Consultation for quitting smoking – Phone number: 113), accompanying all of these warnings.

== Turkey ==
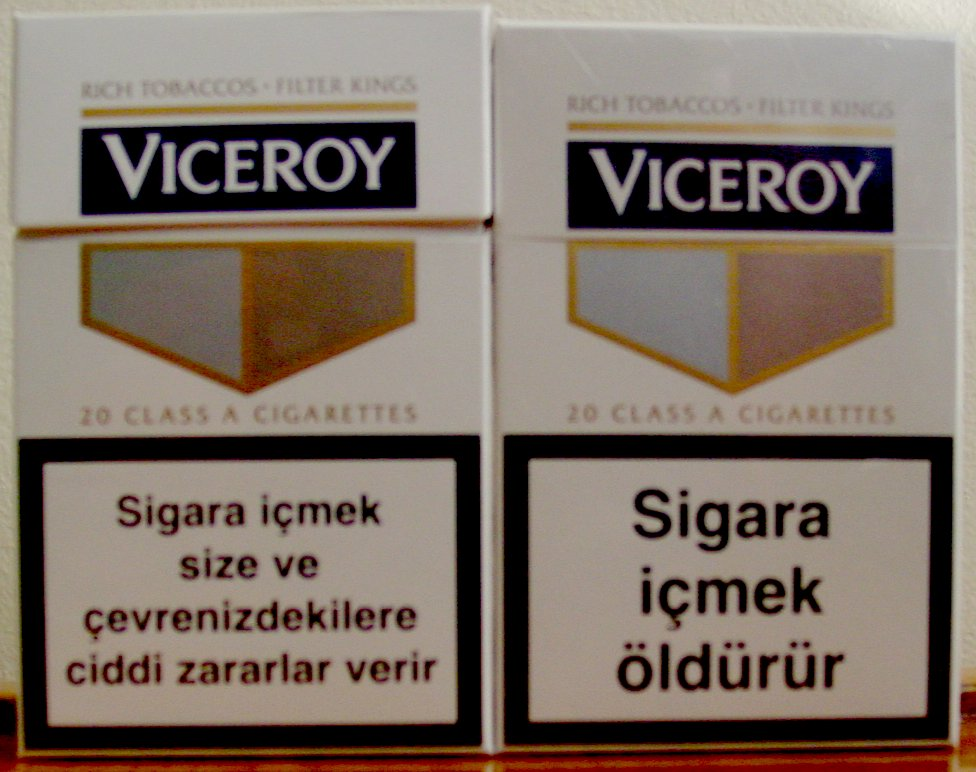
A Turkish Viceroy pack with an old warning

All cigarette packs in Turkey are required to display both text and pictorial warnings, and are plain. Before the introduction of pictorial warnings, cigarette packs in Turkey carried the following warnings:

Front of packaging (covers 65% of surface)

Sigara içmek öldürür
(Smoking kills)

or

Sigara içmek size ve çevrenizdekilere ciddi zararlar verir
(Smoking seriously harms you and others around you)

Back of packaging (covers 40% of surface)

- Sigara içenler genç yaşta ölür. (Smokers die younger)
- Sigara içmek damarları tıkar, kalp krizine ve felçlere neden olur. (Smoking clogs the arteries and causes heart attacks and paralysis.)
- Sigara içmek ölümcül akciğer kanserine neden olur. (Smoking causes lethal lung cancer)
- Hamile iken sigara içmek bebeğe zarar verir. (Smoking while pregnant will harm the baby)
- Çocukları koruyun: Dumanınızı onlara solutmayın. (Protect your children, don't let them breathe your smoke.)
- Sağlık kuruluşları sigarayı bırakmada size yardımcı olabilir. (Health agencies can help you quit smoking)
- Sigara içmek yüksek derecede bağımlılık yapar, başlamayın. (Smoking is highly addictive, don't start)
- Sigarayı bırakmak ölümcül kalp ve akciğer hastalıkları riskini azaltır. (Stopping smoking reduces the risk of fatal heart and lung diseases)
- Sigara içmek ağrılı ve yavaş bir ölüme neden olabilir. (Smoking can cause a slow and painful death)
- Sigarayı bırakmak için doktorunuzdan ve ... den yardım isteyin. (To quit smoking ask for help from your doctor and ...)
- Sigara içmek kan akışını yavaşlatır ve cinsel iktidarsızlığa neden olur. (Smoking will slow the blood flow and cause impotence)
- Sigara içmek cildin erken yaşlanmasına neden olur. (Smoking causes early ageing of the skin)
- Sigara içmek spermlere zarar vererek doğurganlığı azaltır. (Smoking can damage the sperm and decreases fertility)
- Sigara dumanında benzen, nitrozamin, formaldehit ve hidrojensiyanit gibi kanser yapıcı maddeler bulunur. (Cigarette smoke contains carcinogens such as benzene, nitrosamines, formaldehyde and hydrogen cyanide.)

In 2010, Turkey introduced mandatory pictorial tobacco warnings. The warning images and sizes were expanded in 2019. This expansion included the introduction of plain tobacco packaging.

== Ukraine ==
The warning messages on cigarette packets in Ukraine are also visually similar to those in European Union countries:

Warning messages on Ukrainian cigarette packets
Message	English translation	Example design
Курiння призводить до серцево-судинних захворювань та раку легенiв.	Smoking causes heart diseases and lung cancer.	Warning on Lucky Strike pack from Ukraine
Курiння викликає залежнiсть, не починайте курити.	Smoking is highly addictive, don't start.	Warning on Lucky Strike pack from Ukraine
Курiння викликає iмпотенцiю.	Smoking causes impotence.	Warning on Lucky Strike pack from Ukraine
Захистiть дiтей: не дозволяйте їм дихати вашим димом.	Protect your children, don't let them inhale your smoke.	Warning on Lucky Strike pack from Ukraine
Курiння під час вагiтностi шкодить вашiй дитинi.	Smoking while pregnant harms your child.	Warning on Lucky Strike pack from Ukraine
Тютюновий дим шкодить здоров'ю тих, хто вас оточує.	Cigarette smoke harms those around you.	Warning on Lucky Strike pack from Ukraine
Курцi помирають рано.	Smokers die younger.	Warning on Lucky Strike pack from Ukraine

New regulations for tobacco packaging went into effect in January 2024. Since the new regulations, pictorial warnings must be included on cigarette packs, with text and pictorial warnings needing to occupy 65% of the pack area. Additionally, a QR code was added, linking to resources to stop smoking.

== United Kingdom ==
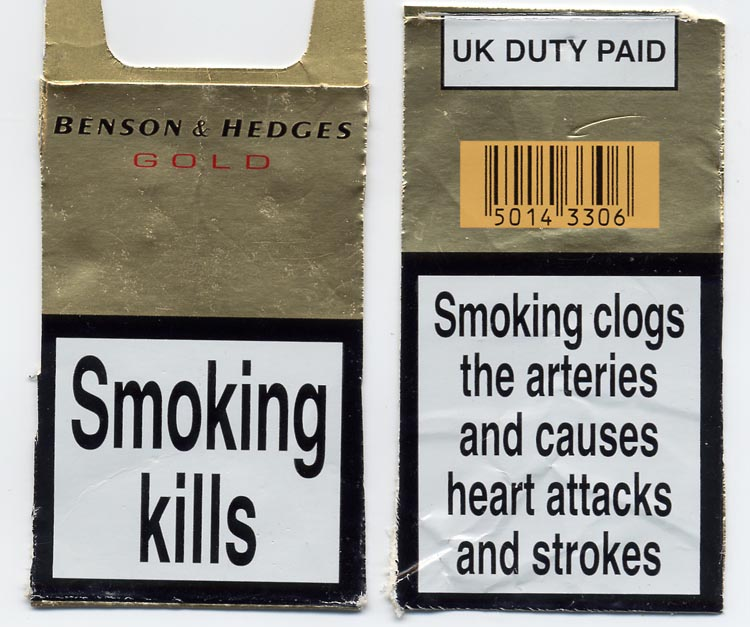
A Benson & Hedges pack in the United Kingdom, before the introduction of plain packaging in 2017

In 1971, tobacco companies printed on the left side of cigarette packets an official warning: "Warning by H.M. Government – Smoking can harm your health", followed by the phrase "Health Department's Chief Medical Officers", issuers of the warning.

In 1991, the EU tightened laws on tobacco warnings. Thus, the message "Tobacco seriously damages health" was printed on the front of all tobacco packs. An additional warning was also printed on the reverse of cigarette packs.

In 2003, new EU regulations required one of the following general warnings must be displayed, covering at least 30% of the surface of the pack:

- Smoking kills (- quit now)
- Smoking seriously harms you and others around you

Additionally, one of the following additional warnings must be displayed, covering at least 40% of the surface of the pack:

- Smokers die younger
- Smoking clogs the arteries and causes heart attacks and strokes
- Smoking causes fatal lung cancer
- Smoking when pregnant harms your baby
- Protect children: don't make them breathe your smoke
- Your doctor or your pharmacist can help you stop smoking
- Smoking is highly addictive, don't start
- Stopping smoking reduces the risk of fatal heart and lung diseases
- Smoking can cause a slow and painful death
- Get help to stop smoking: [telephone]/[postal address]/[internet address]/consult your doctor/pharmacist
- Smoking may reduce the blood flow and cause impotence
- Smoking causes ageing of the skin
- Smoking can damage the sperm and decreases fertility
- Smoke contains benzene, nitrosamines, formaldehyde and hydrogen cyanide

From October 2008, all cigarette products manufactured must carry picture warnings in the reverse. Every pack must have one of these warnings by October 2009.

Plain packaging, including prominent and standardised health warnings and minimal manufacturer information, became compulsory for all cigarette and hand-rolling tobacco packs manufactured after May 2016 and sold after May 2017.

The warnings from 2017 until Brexit in 2020 were the same as in the EU. However after Brexit, the layout remained the same but, in Great Britain, the photos were changed to the ones from Australia. In Northern Ireland, they did not change.

== United States ==
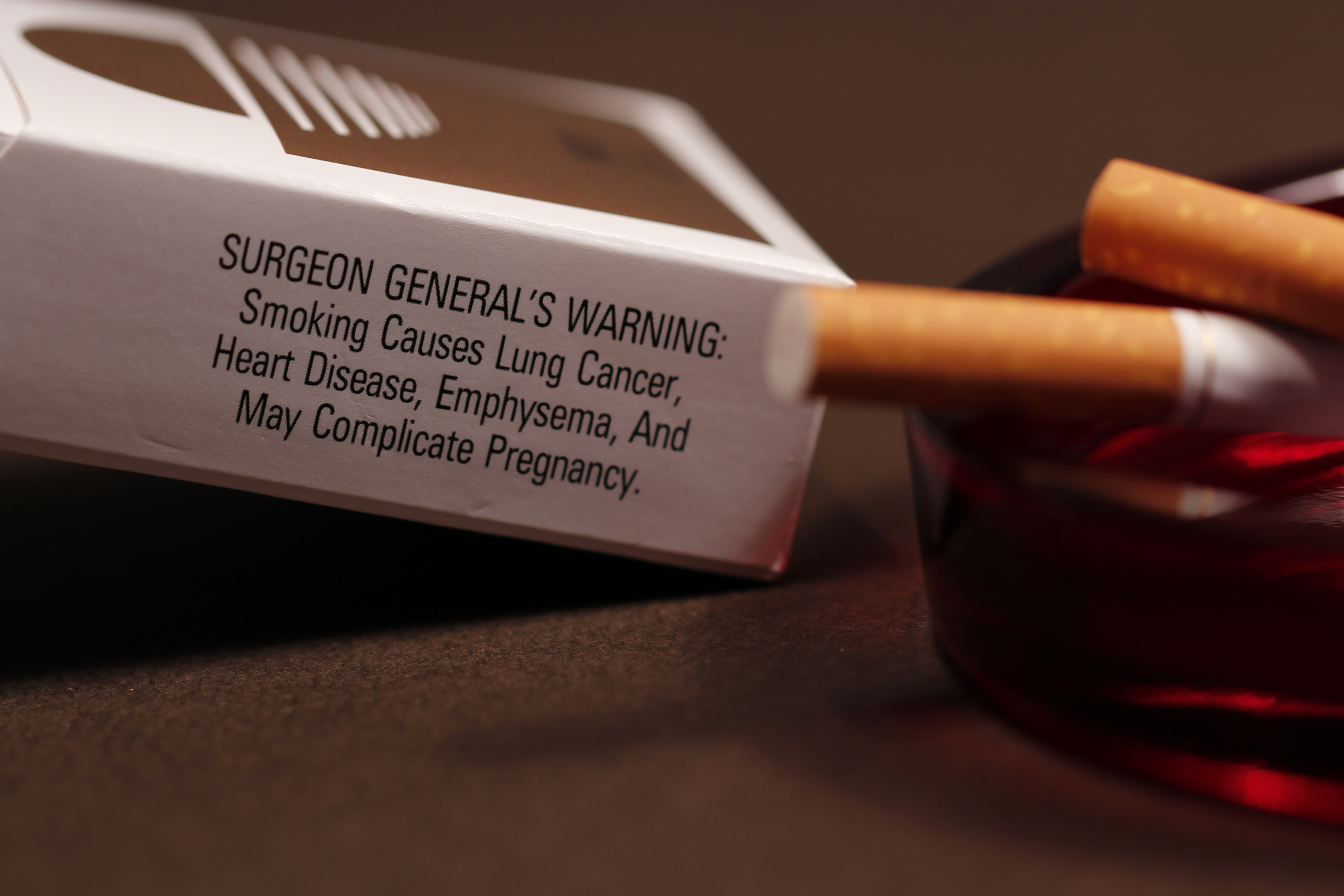
A Surgeon General's warning on a cigarette pack, 2012

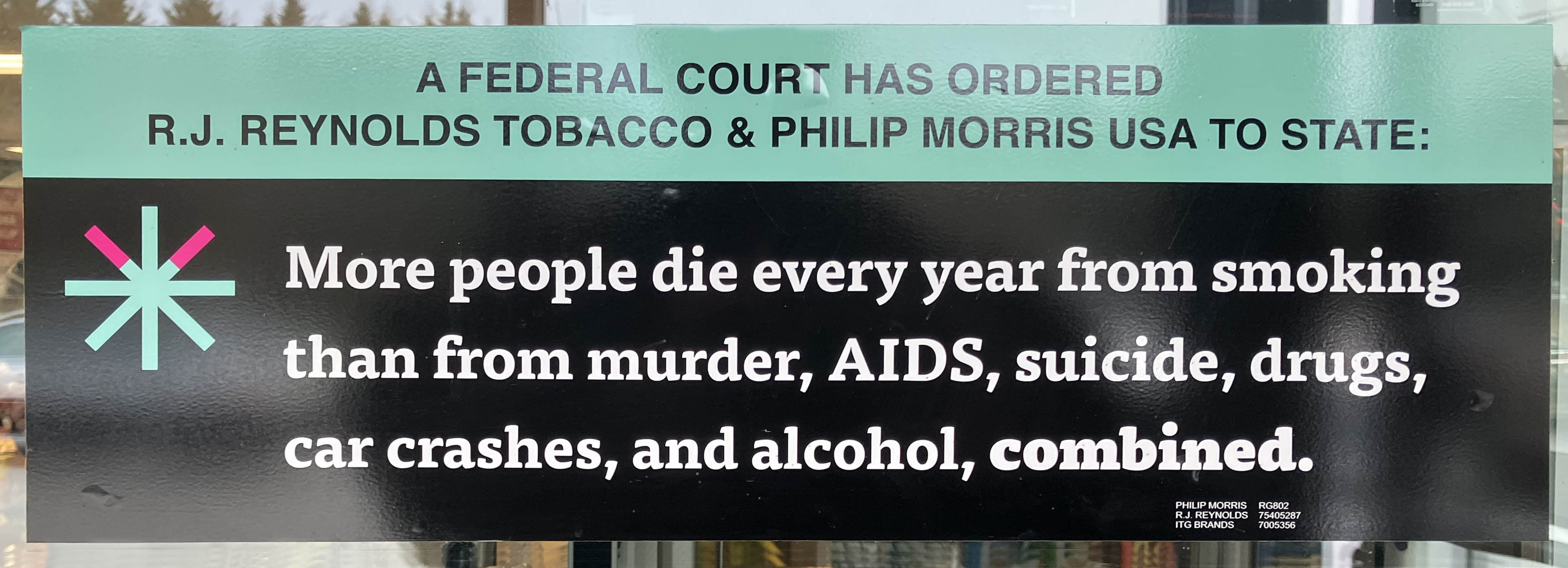
In addition to warnings on cigarette packages, US courts have ordered warning statements such as this one on a convenience store.

In 1966, the United States became the first nation in the world to require a health warning on cigarette packages.

In 1973, the assistant director of Research at R.J. Reynolds Tobacco Company wrote an internal memorandum regarding new brands of cigarettes for the youth market. He observed that, "psychologically, at eighteen, one is immortal" and theorized that "the desire to be daring is part of the motivation to start smoking." He stated, "in this sense the label on the package is a plus."

In 1999, Philip Morris USA purchased three brands of cigarettes from Liggett Group Inc. The brands were: Chesterfield, L&M, and Lark. At the time Philip Morris purchased the brands from Liggett, the packaging for those cigarettes included the statement "Smoking is Addictive". After Philip Morris acquired the three Liggett brands, it removed the statement from the packages.

Though the United States started the trend of labeling cigarette packages with warnings, today the country has one of the least restrictive labelling requirements on their packages. Warnings are usually in small typeface placed along one of the sides of the cigarette packs with colors and fonts that closely resemble the rest of the package, so the warnings essentially are integrated and do not stand out with the rest of the cigarette package.

However, this is subject to change as the Family Smoking Prevention and Tobacco Control Act of 2009 requires color graphics with supplemental text that depicts the negative consequences of smoking to cover 50% of the front and rear of each pack. The nine new graphic warning labels were announced by the FDA in June 2011 and were required to appear on packaging by September 2012, though this was delayed by legal challenges.

In August 2011, five tobacco companies filed a lawsuit against the FDA in an effort to reverse the new warning mandate. Tobacco companies claimed that being required to promote government anti-smoking campaigns by placing the new warnings on packaging violates the companies' free speech rights. Additionally, R.J. Reynolds, Lorillard, Commonwealth Brands Inc., Liggett Group LLC and Santa Fe Natural Tobacco Company Inc. claimed that the graphic labels are an unconstitutional way of forcing tobacco companies to engage in anti-smoking advocacy on the government's behalf. A First Amendment lawyer, Floyd Abrams, represented the tobacco companies in the case, contending that requiring graphic warning labels on a lawful product cannot withstand constitutional scrutiny. The Association of National Advertisers and the American Advertising Federation also filed a brief in the suit, arguing that the labels infringe on commercial free speech and could lead to further government intrusion if left unchallenged.

On 29 February 2012, US District Judge Richard Leon ruled that the labels violate the right to free speech in the First Amendment. However, the following month the US Court of Appeals for the 6th Circuit upheld the majority of the Tobacco Control Act of 2009, including the part requiring graphic warning labels. In April 2013 the Supreme Court declined to hear the appeal to this ruling, allowing the new labels to stand. As the original ruling against the FDA images was not actually reversed, the FDA will again need to go through the process of developing the new warning labels, and the timetable and final product remain unknown. Additionally, rulings of the 6th Circuit are precedential only in the states comprising the 6th Circuit, i.e., Michigan, Ohio, Kentucky, and Tennessee.

In March 2020, the FDA approved a set of 11 new graphic warning labels with images for cigarette packaging, with a deadline of compliance being set to June 18, 2021. The mandate would have required packaging to cover the top 50% of the front and rear panels of packages, as well as at least 20% of the top. Tobacco manufacturers R.J. Reynolds Tobacco Co., Philip Morris USA, ITG Brands LLC and Liggett Group LLC filed a joint motion requesting a preliminary injunction on implementing the labels and a ruling to prohibit enforcement in April 2020. They argued that the new packaging would have been a violation of the First Amendment. In December 2022, U.S. district judge J. Campbell Barker of the Eastern District of Texas ordered the new guidelines to be vacated, arguing the multiple interpretation of images cannot prove neutrality. The deadline was pushed to November 6, 2023. The decision was later appealed and overturned by a U.S. Appeals court who ruled unanimously that the warnings were "factual and uncontroversial" and thus was not in violation of the First Amendment. The decision was later appealed again to the U.S. Supreme Court. However, the Court declined to hear the case, thus making the new packaging legal. In September 2024, the FDA announced that enforcement of the new packaging would begin on December 12, 2025.

=== Cigars ===
- SURGEON GENERAL'S WARNING: Cigar Smoking Can Cause Cancers of the Mouth And Throat, Even If You Do Not Inhale.
- SURGEON GENERAL'S WARNING: Cigars Are Not A Safe Alternative To Cigarettes.
- SURGEON GENERAL'S WARNING: Tobacco Smoke Increases The Risk of Lung Cancer And Heart Disease, Even in Nonsmokers.
- SURGEON GENERAL'S WARNING: Cigar Smoking Can Cause Lung Cancer And Heart Disease.
- SURGEON GENERAL'S WARNING: Tobacco Use Increases The Risk of Infertility, Stillbirth, And Low Birth Weight.
- SURGEON GENERAL'S WARNING: This Product Contains/Produces Chemicals Known to the State of California To Cause Cancer, And Birth Defects Or Other Reproductive Harm.

Stronger warning labels started to appear in May 2010, but are yet to be officially implemented.

=== Smokeless tobacco ===
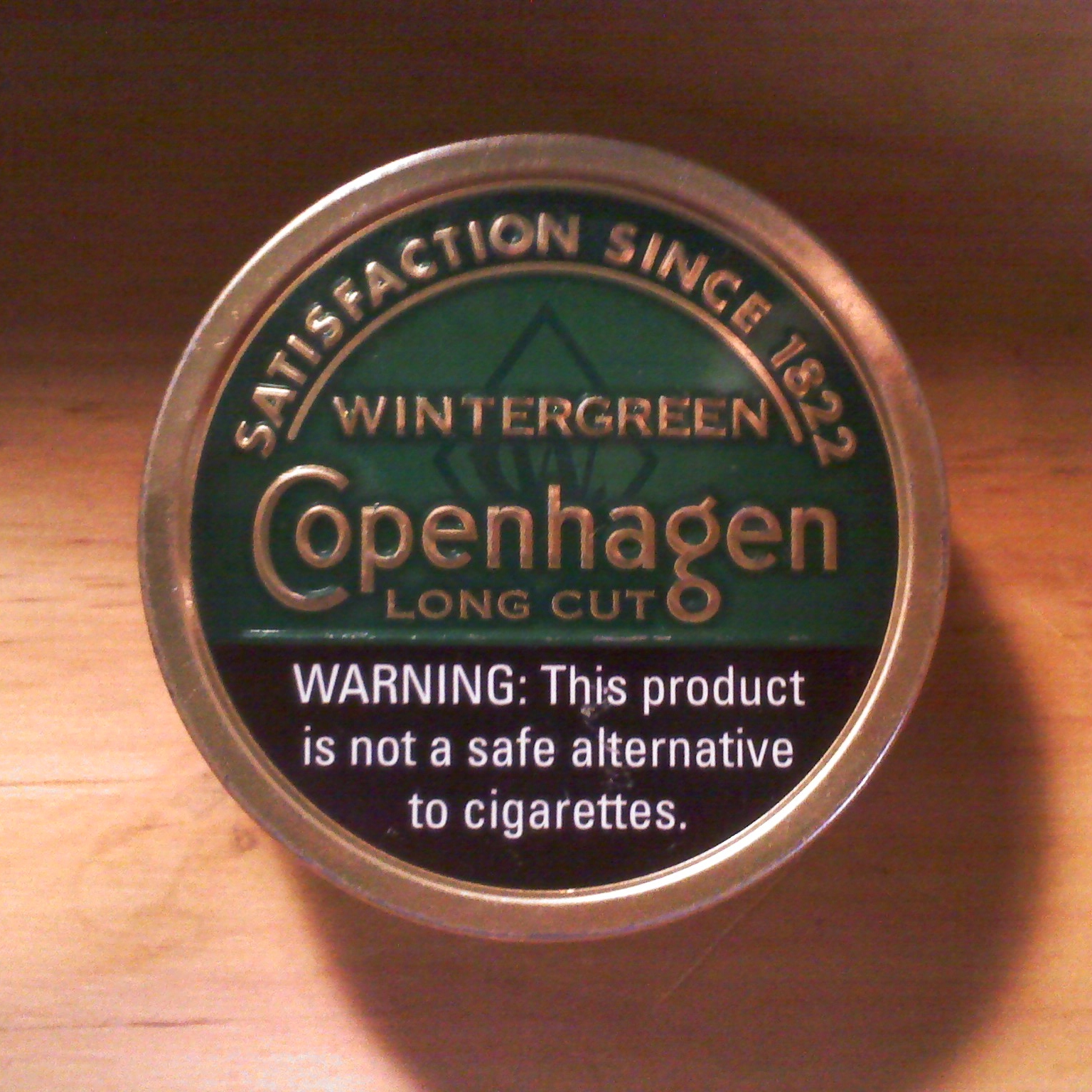
A can of Copenhagen with a warning label

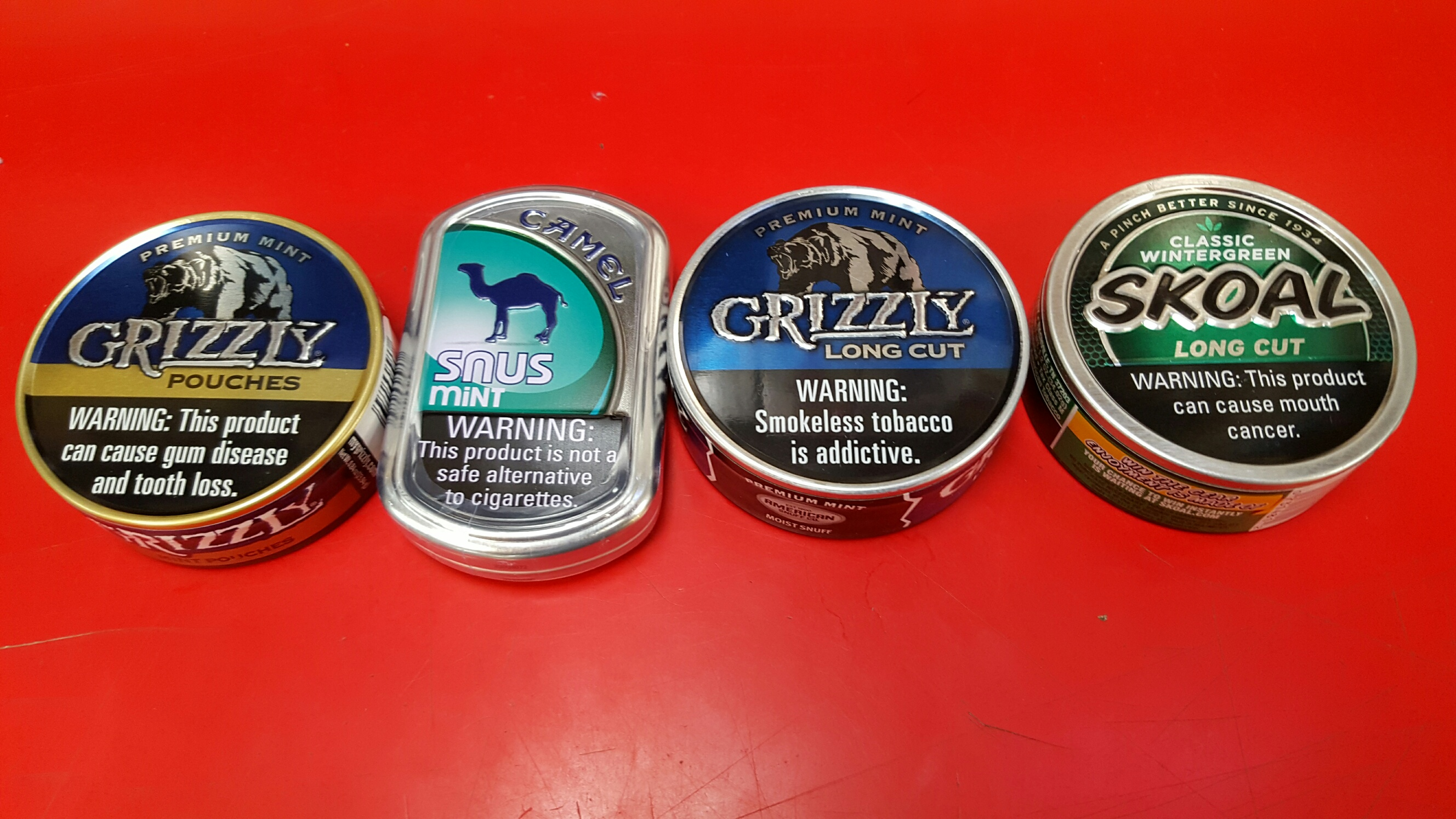
The four warning label variants seen on various chewing tobacco products sold in the United States

Effective June 2010, the following labels began to appear on smokeless tobacco products (most of which are chewing tobacco) and their advertisements.

- WARNING: This product can cause mouth cancer.
- WARNING: This product can cause gum disease and tooth loss.
- WARNING: This product is not a safe alternative to cigarettes.
- WARNING: Smokeless tobacco is addictive.

These warnings are required to comprise 30% of two principal display panels on the packaging; on advertisements, the health warnings must constitute 20% of the total area.

== Venezuela ==
In 1978, Venezuela began printing a warning in small type along one of the sides of cigarette packs: "Advertencia: 'Se ha determinado que el fumar cigarrillos es nocivo para la salud' – Ley de Impuesto sobre Cigarrillos" (Warning: "It has been determined that cigarette smoking is harmful to health" (in brackets) – Cigarette Tax Law).

On 24 March 2005, as part of the "Venezuela 100% libre de humo" (100% smoke-free Venezuela) campaign initiated by Hugo Chávez, another warning similar to that of Brazil was introduced: "Este producto contiene alquitrán, nicotina y monóxido de carbono, los cuales son cancerígenos y tóxicos. No existen niveles seguros para el consumo de estas sustancias" ("This product contains tar, nicotine and carbon monoxide, which are carcinogenic and toxic. There are no safe levels for consumption of these substances"). The 1978 warning was not removed, so cigarette packs contains both warnings, one on each side, since then. In addition, one of the following warnings with images is randomly printed, occupying 100% of the back of the pack (40% for the text warning and 60% for the image):

- Este producto es dañino para la salud y produce adicción (This product is hazardous to your health and is addictive)
- Fumar causa mal aliento, pérdida de muelas y cáncer de boca (Smoking causes bad breath, tooth decay and mouth cancer)
- Fumar causa cáncer de pulmón, tos, enfisema pulmonar y bronquitis crónica (Smoking causes lung cancer, coughing, pulmonar emphysema and chronic bronchitis). The picture accompanying this warning is a comparison between a smoker's lung on the left and a healthy lung on the right.
- Fumar causa infarto al corazón. Q.E.P.D. al portador, muerto por fumador (Smoking causes cardiac infarction. R.I.P. bearer, killed by smoking)
- Fumar durante el embarazo daña la salud de tu bebé (Smoking while pregnant harms your baby's health)
- Los niños y niñas comienzan a fumar al ver adultos fumando (Children start smoking when they see adults smoke)
- Fumar cigarrillos causa cáncer de laringe (Smoking cigarettes causes laryngeal cancer)
- Fumar causa impotencia en los hombres (Smoking causes impotence in men)
- El humo del cigarrillo afecta también a quien no fuma (Cigarette smoke also harms those who don't smoke)
- Da hoy el primer paso, dejar de fumar es posible (Take your first step today, quitting smoking is possible)

Curiously, these warnings only appear on cigarette packs and not on other tobacco products, which use the 1978 warning.

== Vietnam ==
The following warnings have appeared on Vietnamese cigarette packages since 2013, along with graphic, disturbing images of tobacco-related harms:

- Hút thuốc dẫn đến cái chết từ từ và đau đớn (Smoking leads to a slow and painful death)
- Khói thuốc lá rất có hại cho thai nhi và trẻ nhỏ (Cigarette smoke is harmful to infants and young children)
- Hút thuốc gây bệnh tim mạch (Smoking causes heart diseases)
- Hút thuốc gây ung thư họng và thanh quản (Smoking causes throat and laryngeal cancer)
- Hút thuốc gây hôi miệng và hỏng răng (Smoking causes halitosis and damages teeth)
- Hút thuốc gây ung thư phổi (Smoking causes lung cancer)
