= Raison (cigarette) =

South Korean cigarette brand

- An old South Korean pack of Raison cigarettes, with a South Korean text warning at the bottom of the pack.
- Product type: Cigarette
- Current owner: Korea Tobacco & Ginseng Corporation
- Produced by: Korea Tobacco & Ginseng Corporation
- Country: South Korea
- Markets: China, Indonesia, South Korea, Turkey

Raison is a South Korean brand of cigarettes, currently owned and manufactured by KT&G. Raison is a popular brand of cigarettes in South Korea. In Indonesia, this brand was produced by PT. Mandiri Maha Mulia.

== See also ==
- Tobacco smoking
