= Korea Tobacco & Ginseng Corporation =

South Korean tobacco company

KT&G Corporation
- Native name: 주식회사 케이티앤지
- Formerly: Korea Tobacco & Ginseng Corporation
- Type: Public
- Traded as: KRX: 033780
- Industry: Tobacco
- Predecessor: Korea Monopoly Corporation
- Founded: April 1989; 37 years ago
- Headquarters: Daejeon, Chungnam, South Korea
- Key people: Bok-In Baek (President & CEO)
- Products: Cigarettes
- Revenue: ▲USD 3.9 billion (2018)
- Operating income: ▼USD 1.07 billion (2018)
- Total assets: USD 10.1 billion (2018)
- Subsidiaries: KGC; Yungjin Pharm

KT&G Corporation (Korean: 주식회사 케이티앤지), originally Korea Tobacco & Ginseng, also branded as Korea Tomorrow & Global, is the leading tobacco company in South Korea with annual sales over US$4 billion. KT&G was originally a government-owned monopoly but was privatised and today is publicly traded, competing for market share with other international tobacco firms such as Philip Morris International, British American Tobacco, and Japan Tobacco. KT&G's sales volume share was 62% of the Korean market in 2009.

KT&G also owns significant subsidiaries such as Korea Ginseng Corporation, Yungjin Pharm (a pharmaceutical company), and several bio ventures. Its headquarters are in Daejeon.

== Brands ==
KT&G produces popular Korean cigarette brands such as The One, Indigo, Arirang, This, This Plus, Zest, Esse, Raison, and Lo Crux. It has been expanded outside Korea, especially through its superslim brand Esse in Russia and other Eastern European markets.

== See also ==
- Smoking in South Korea
