= Korea Ginseng Corporation =

South Korean ginseng company

- Hangul: 한국인삼공사
- Hanja: 韓國人蔘公社
- Revised Romanization: Hanguk Insam Gongsa
- McCune–Reischauer: Hanguk Tampae Insam Kongsa

KGC (originally Korea Ginseng Corporation, Korea Ginseng Corp. Korean : 한국인삼공사, Hanguk Insam Gongsa) is a ginseng company in South Korea. KGC's representative ginseng brand 'Cheong Kwan Jang's (정관장 正官庄) share in korean ginseng market is known to be dominant around over 80% and also accounted for to be 35% of Korea's total health products market in 2011.

KGC produces popular Korean Red Ginseng products under the brand name 'Cheong Kwan Jang' in such different format as Korean Red Ginseng Heaven/Earth/Good, Korean Red Ginseng Extract, Korean Red Ginseng Powder, Honeyed Korean Red Ginseng Slices, Korean Red Ginseng Tonic, etc in order to meet with consumers various demand. It has expanded outside Korea, especially into the East Asian market like China and Taiwan.

KGC is a subsidiary company of KT&G, and its two headquarters are in Seoul and Daejeon.

== History ==
Korean Ginseng Corporation was founded in 1899 Samjungkwa was established as the forerunner of the Korean Ginseng Corporation. And in 1908 the company was monopolized.

Fast-forward to the 1940s KGC's brand of Korean Red Ginseng, CKJ, is known as Cheong-Kwan-Jang in Korea and overseas. This brand name goes back to the early 1940s. Because of increased export demand for Korean Red Ginseng at the end of the Japanese colonial period, many fake roots were prospering. To find a way to distinguish real ginseng, the Monopoly Bureau of the Japanese General Government began using the label "Cheong-Kwan-Jang", which is translated as "officially government approved".

The sale of KGC was a government monopoly from 1899 to 1996. Since then, KGC has held its position at the top of the market, even though the name has changed from the Monopoly Bureau to Korea Tobacco & Ginseng Corporation, and finally to KT&G subsidiary Korea Ginseng Corp.

=== Clinical trials in China ===
From 1998 to 2001, KGC conducted a three-year clinical trial in Haining City, an area with high colorectal cancer incidence in China, to determine whether their new product "Ginseng Pills" (which KGC claimed contained 0.4mg of ginseng extract) could prevent colorectal cancer. The informed consent form for the "Ginseng Pills" mentioned potential blood pressure elevation, stating that those who developed hypertension should discontinue the medication, and hypertensive patients were prohibited from participating. However, Shen Xinlian, an illiterate farmer from Haining, was enrolled in the trial at Maqiao Township Health Center without proper informed consent, despite already having elevated blood pressure; later, when she developed hypertension with systolic pressure exceeding 230 mmHg (9.1 inHg), the health center did not advise her to stop taking the medication. On February 23, 2004, Shen Xinlian died of uremia. Her family sued the trial institutions but lost the case as they couldn't prove causation. Due to a series of similar clinical trial incidents, China strengthened its clinical trial legislation in 2003 and 2004.

The trial was conducted through the Cancer Institute of Zhejiang Medical University. A separate trial was conducted for stomach cancer prevention. A 1999 journal article mentions the two trials in progress, though the Korean side is named not as KGC, but as "Korea Complementary and Alternative Medicine Institute".

== KGC Global ==
KGC products are now exported to over 40 countries. KGC also has overseas branches in the USA, China, Taiwan, Japan, the Philippines and Indonesia.

== Sports ==
In September 2010, parent company KT&G transferred the ownership and naming rights of its sports teams to KGC. All teams were renamed accordingly.

KGC sponsors the following teams:

- Anyang KGC (men's basketball) – based in Anyang
- Daejeon KGC (women's volleyball) – based in Daejeon
- Table tennis (men's team) – based in Anyang
- Badminton – based in Daejeon

The year 2012 would later be dubbed the "Golden Age of KGC" as its athletes all achieved success that year; its table tennis and badminton players won titles in their respective sport while the women's volleyball team and men's basketball team each won their respective play-off championships.
