= Esse (cigarette) =

Korean cigarette brand

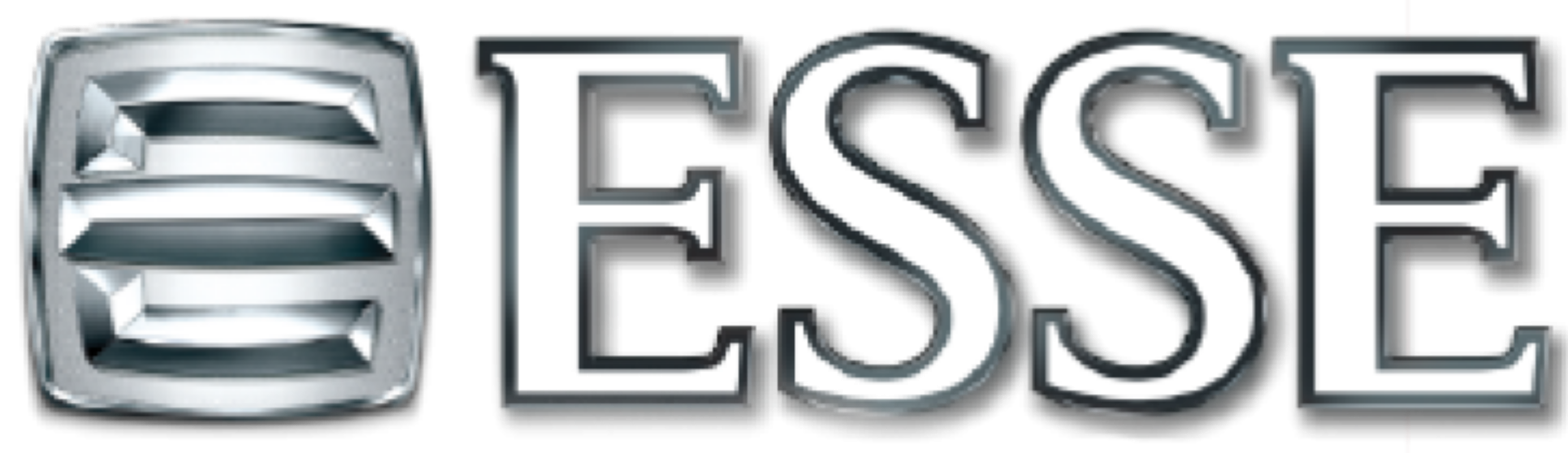

- An old Russian pack of Esse cigarettes, with a Russian text warning at the bottom of the pack.
- Product type: Cigarette
- Produced by: Korea Tomorrow & Global Corporation
- Country: South Korea
- Introduced: 1996; 30 years ago
- Markets: See Markets

Esse is a brand of cigarettes, currently owned and manufactured by the Korea Tobacco & Ginseng Corporation. The brand is specifically targeted towards women.

== History ==
Esse was introduced in 1996 by the Korea Tomorrow & Global Corporation and expanded internationally outside of South Korea, including in Russia and Eastern Europe, where the brand was introduced in 2003. The Esse brand is available in Asia and some countries in Europe.

== Markets ==
ESSE is the world's leading super-slim cigarette brand, has expanded to approximately 90 global markets, including strong consumer bases across Southeast Asia (such as Indonesia), the Middle East, Russia, Central Asia, Latin America, and recent expansions into Europe and duty-free locations in Japan.
