= Jadran (cigarette) =

Croatian cigarette brand

- Product type: Cigarette
- Current owner: British American Tobacco
- Produced by: Adris grupa
- Country: Croatia
- Markets: Croatia

Jadran is a Croatian brand of cigarettes, currently owned and manufactured by the Adris Grupa (formerly known as Tvornica Duhana Rovinj), a division of British American Tobacco. Jadran means The Adriatic in South Slavic languages.

== History ==
Pack of Jadran cigarettes

The brand was founded in the Socialist Republic of Croatia and quickly became one of the most popular brands in the Croatian-speaking parts of Yugoslavia, along with Opatija. The brand was mainly popular with the upper-class within Socialist Croatia, and is one of the few brands to survive after the Breakup of Yugoslavia and Croatia became its own country, along with Drina. Jadran was named after a sea, similar to other Yugoslavian brands which were named after seas and rivers like Morava, and Drava.

== See also ==
- Tobacco smoking
- Drina (cigarette)
- Elita (cigarette)
- Filter 57 (cigarette)
- Laika (cigarette)
- Lovćen (cigarette)
- Morava (cigarette)
- Partner (cigarette)
- Smart (cigarette)
- Time (cigarette)
- Sobranie
- Jin Ling
- LD (cigarette)
- Walter Wolf (cigarette)
