= Laika (cigarette) =

Soviet brand of cigarettes

- An old Soviet pack of Laika cigarettes.
- Product type: Cigarette
- Produced by: Various Soviet tobacco factories, including Tabachnaya Fabrika Dukat Moscow and the Tabachnaya Fabrika No.1 Leningrad
- Country: Soviet Union
- Introduced: 1957; 69 years ago
- Discontinued: 1990s
- Markets: See Markets

Laika (Russian: Лайка) was a Soviet brand of cigarettes, which was manufactured by various Soviet tobacco companies, but most notably the "Tabachnaya Fabrika Dukat Moscow" and the "Tabachnaya Fabrika No.1 Leningrad". The brand was named after the USSR space dog Laika, the first animal launched into orbit.

== History ==
Laika cigarettes were created in 1957 to honour Laika, a dog sent into space by the Soviet space program. The cigarettes were produced under supervision of the Ministry of Food Industry. The cigarettes were mainly sold in the Soviet Union, but also in the United Kingdom, the People's Republic of Bulgaria and Finland as Duty Free variants.

A few TV advertisements were made for Laika cigarettes.

It is unknown when the brand was discontinued, but it is speculated that Laika cigarettes were ended when the dissolution of the Soviet Union happened. It is known, however, that the cigarettes were sold up until the 1980s.

== Packaging ==
The pack is a mixture of blue and white, featuring Laika on the front of the pack with the word "Лайка" ("Laika") written underneath in Russian, as well as the Sputnik 2, the Hammer and sickle which is placed on the rocket she was in, and the Moon and various stars, representing space. The back features a message that is written in Russian, as well as a seal of approval, the date the pack was created, the number of cigarettes in the pack (20) and the words "Made in U.S.S.R." written in English.

== See also ==
- Smoking in Russia
- Tobacco smoking
- Drina (cigarette)
- Elita (cigarette)
- Filter 57 (cigarette)
- Gauloises
- Jadran (cigarette)
- Lovćen (cigarette)
- Morava (cigarette)
- Partner (cigarette)
- Smart (cigarette)
- Time (cigarette)
- Sobranie
- Jin Ling
- LD (cigarette)
- Walter Wolf (cigarette)
