= Filter 57 =

Slovenian cigarette brand

- An old Slovenian pack of Filter 57 cigarettes.
- Product type: Cigarette
- Produced by: Tobačna Ljubljana, a division of Imperial Tobacco
- Country: Socialist Republic of Slovenia
- Introduced: 1957; 69 years ago
- Markets: Socialist Republic of Slovenia, Yugoslavia, Slovenia

Filter 57 is a Slovenian brand of cigarettes, owned and manufactured by "Tobačna Ljubljana, a division of Imperial Tobacco. In the Islamic Republic of Iran, the cigarettes are known as "57" and are manufactured by the Iranian Tobacco Company.

== History ==
The brand was created in 1957 in the Socialist Republic of Slovenia and also became the first filtered cigarette in Yugoslavia. The difference from other brands at the time, such as Drina, Jadran, Drava and so on, was that these cigarettes were packed upside down, which made them a really popular smoke amongst the Slovenian working class. Previously, its been often thought that the reason for the cigarettes being packaged upside down is that the hands of these workers were often dirty, and thus when they would grab a cigarette by the filter, it would get dirty too. However, if the filter laid at the bottom, the paper would get dirty when grabbed, but that wouldn't a problem because it would get burned up anyway, allowing the worker to place the filter in the mouth cleanly. But, this In fact, is an urban myth. According to the Museum of Contemporary History of Slovenia, a technical error was the true reason why "57" cigarettes were packed upside down.

This brand got an almost cult-like following in socialist Slovenia. After the breakup of Yugoslavia, the cigarette is still largely popular in modern-day Slovenia, but the manufacturing operations of the "Tobačna Ljubljana were ended. The brand had a 57% market share in the Yugoslavian cigarette market and represented almost 80% of the total production in 1962.

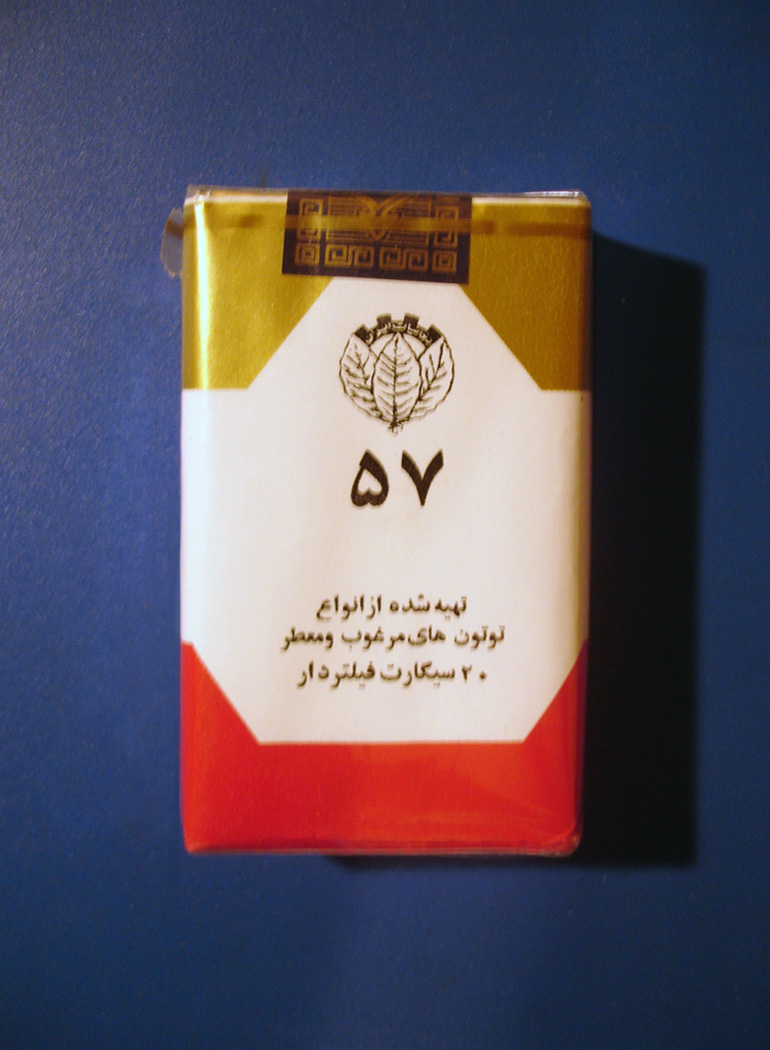
An old Iranian pack of 57 cigarettes.

== Packaging ==
The pack features primarily green and white colours, along with a dragon-like feature. Folk imagination provided an interesting interpretation of the visual image of the Filter 57 box, which says that in the contours of the dragon's head we can recognize a cup of coffee and in its hull an outline of Slovenia. The dragon-shaped arrow in the form of an arrow points to number 57, which means that the whole of Slovenia at the tea bath 57. The opening verse of Prešeren's The Water Man appeared later on the edge of the box. Filter 57 was considered to be a product of Ljubljana with the symbols of Ljubljana.

== See also ==
- Tobacco smoking
- Drina (cigarette)
- Elita (cigarette)
- Jadran (cigarette)
- Laika (cigarette)
- Lovćen (cigarette)
- Morava (cigarette)
- Partner (cigarette)
- Smart (cigarette)
- Time (cigarette)
- Sobranie
- Jin Ling
- LD (cigarette)
- Walter Wolf (cigarette)
