= Elita (cigarette) =

Latvian cigarette brand

- An old Latvian pack of Elita, with a Latvian text warning at the bottom of the pack
- Product type: Cigarette
- Produced by: British American Tobacco
- Country: Latvia
- Introduced: 1967; 59 years ago
- Discontinued: 2009
- Markets: Latvian Soviet Socialist Republic, Latvia, Lithuania, Russia
- Previous owners: "Rīgas Tabakas Fabrika"

Elita is a Latvian brand of cigarettes that was produced between 1967 and 2009 by the Latvian company "Rīgas Tabakas Fabrika" and later by British American Tobacco. According to the data submitted by the Latvian State Revenue Service, Elita was the most sold brand of filtered cigarettes in Latvia for about twenty years.

== History ==
Elita cigarettes were launched in 1967. The cigarettes were mostly distributed in Russia, Latvian SSR and Lithuanian SSR. Elita used an American blend of tobacco in their cigarettes. During the Soviet period, the cigarettes were produced in soft packs, but after the restoration of independence of Latvia, packs were produced in hard packages with twenty cigarettes in each pack, and were distributed in cartons consisting of ten packs. There were more than twenty kinds Elitas produced between 1967 and 2009 belonging to the types KS-20-S and KS-20-H. The Trademark for Elita was owned by British American Tobacco.

In 2004, the Elita Light branch brand was discontinued due to restrictions introduced by European Union's directive 2001/37/EU. The packages were modernized with an increased health warning area and changes to inscriptions were made to “Smoking kills” or any other of thirteen variants on the choice of the vendor. An inscription with a volume of tar, nicotine and CO was also added. The package also depicted a barcode and black Der Grüne Punkt.

The brand was mainly sold in the Latvian Soviet Socialist Republic and Latvia, but was also sold in Italy, Lithuania and Russia.

== Production ==
The original production of Elita cigarettes were produced in Rīga, Latvia at a factory located at Miera st. 58. The factory was owned by the state company "Rīgas Tabakas Fabrika", which was founded in 1887. The capacity of the factory was 5.6 billion cigarettes per year. In 1992 Rīgas Tabakas Fabrika was sold to the Latvian-Denmark company House of Prince Latvia. In 1997, the volume of production of Elita was about 24 million packs. Also in 1997, a new variant of the cigarettes was introduced: “Elita Plus”. Starting in 2002, Elita were produced on a new production line using king size (84 mm) tubes. Production at Rīga factory was stopped in 2009 due to a 30% drop in sales and increase of illegal sales.

An old Latvian pack of Elita Full Flavour cigarettes. Note the USSR (or CCCP) on the bottom of the pack.

== See also ==
- Tobacco smoking
- Drina (cigarette)
- Filter 57 (cigarette)
- Jadran (cigarette)
- Laika (cigarette)
- Lovćen (cigarette)
- Morava (cigarette)
- Partner (cigarette)
- Smart (cigarette)
- Time (cigarette)
- Sobranie
- Jin Ling
- LD (cigarette)
- Walter Wolf (cigarette)
