= Partner (cigarette) =

Former Macedonian cigarette brand

- An old Macedonian pack of Partner cigarettes.
- Product type: Cigarette
- Current owner: Makedonija Tabak
- Produced by: Makedonija Tabak
- Country: Macedonia
- Markets: See Markets
- Ambassador: Amar lagbe

Partner was a Macedonian brand of cigarettes that was owned and manufactured by Makedonija Tabak.

== History ==
The brand was founded after the end of World War II and was manufactured by the company "Makedonija Tabak", in the Socialist Republic of Macedonia. It was one of the few Yugoslavian brands sold outside of Yugoslavia, in the Soviet Union, Poland, Finland and Japan. While Partner wasn't as known or popular as Drina, Jadran or Lovćen, it still sold well within socialist Macedonia and, to a lesser extent, socialist Serbia. However, during the breakup of Yugoslavia, the company suffered and eventually the brand ceased to exist, several years after Macedonia became its own country. Due to the fact that this brand looked and sounded foreign compared to similar brands sold in Yugoslavia, it was always seen as the "odd" and "foreign" brand on the market.

== Packaging ==
The pack has a white-blue pattern, with two horses holding a coat of arms with two flower-like symbols. Underneath, the words "Partner Filter" is written in white, surrounded with a red banner. Above and underneath it, the words "king size" and "20 cigarettes" are written in white letters.

== Markets ==
Partner was mainly sold in the Socialist Republic of Macedonia, but also throughout Socialist Federal Republic of Yugoslavia (and after the breakup of Yugoslavia, it was sold for several years in Republic of Macedonia, Serbia and Croatia), as well as in Poland, Hungary, Latvia, Lithuania, Russia.

== See also ==
- Tobacco smoking
- Drina (cigarette)
- Elita (cigarette)
- Filter 57 (cigarette)
- Jadran (cigarette)
- Laika (cigarette)
- Lovćen (cigarette)
- Morava (cigarette)
- Smart (cigarette)
- Time (cigarette)
- Sobranie
- Jin Ling
- LD (cigarette)
- Walter Wolf (cigarette)
