= Walter Wolf (cigarette) =

Croatian cigarette brand

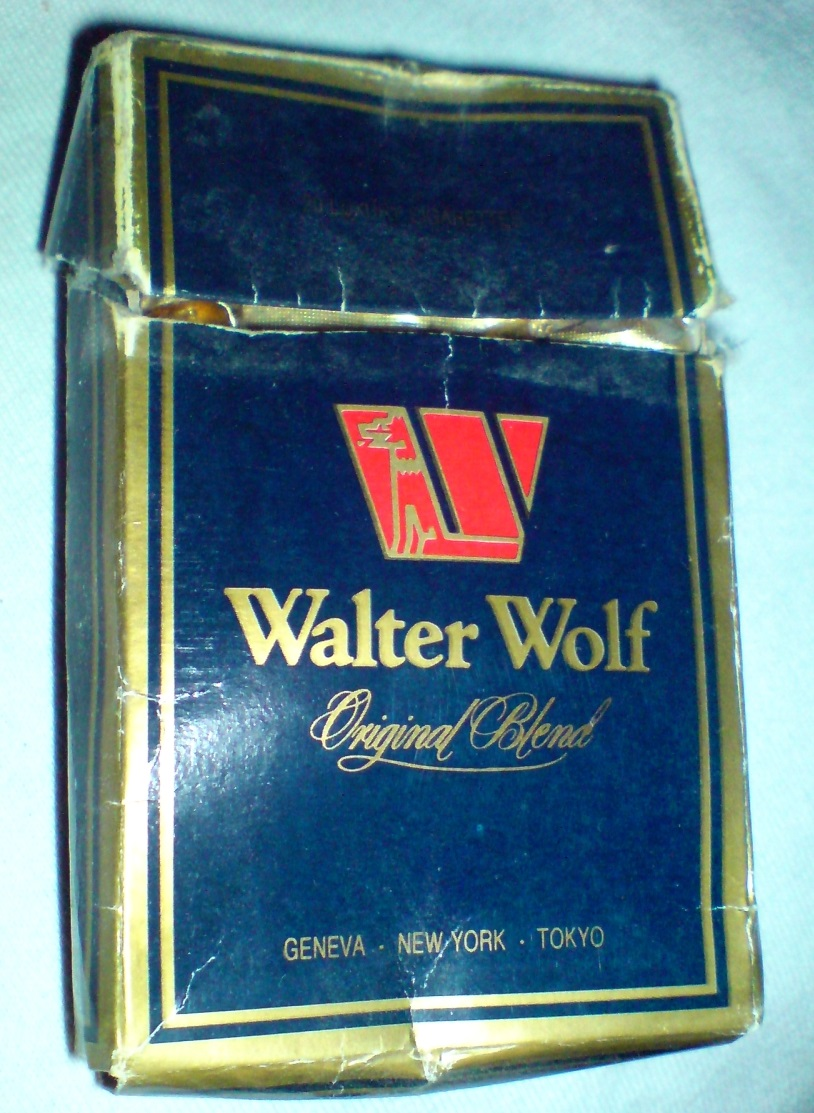
- An old pack of Walter Wolf cigarettes.
- Product type: Cigarette
- Produced by: Tvornica Duhana Rovinj
- Country: Republic of Croatia
- Introduced: Late 1980s
- Markets: See Markets

Walter Wolf is a Croatian brand of cigarettes currently owned and manufactured by the Tvornica Duhana Rovinj.

== History ==
The brand was established in Croatia during the late 1980s and named after the Slovenian-Austrian businessman and motorsport team owner Walter Wolf.

It was introduced to the European market during the Yugoslav Wars following the movement of refugees to Central Europe.

== Pack design ==
The product's logo is a red W with the stylized injected relief of a wolf, and was designed in Switzerland in the 1970s. From the 2000s onwards, the design has been subject to intellectual property rights protection.

The design of the packaging is dark blue with gold lettering and the words "Walter Wolf". The design remained virtually unchanged until 2012 when it became necessary to introduce a variation of the brand name for trade reasons.

The logo was also used in the Formula 1 racing team Walter Wolf Racing, as well as for perfumes and wines.

== Sponsorship ==
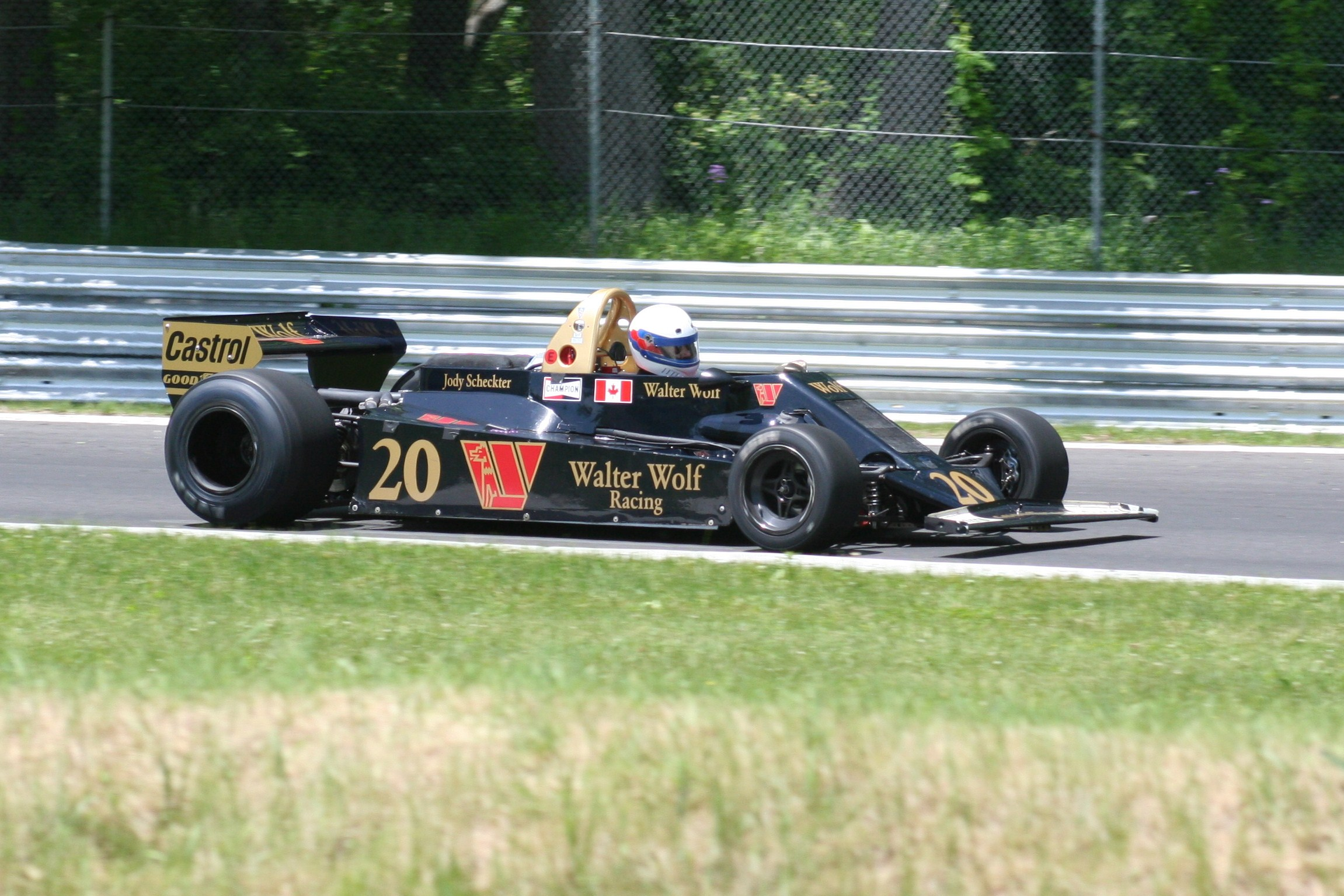
The Wolf WR6 of Jody Scheckter being driven in a Historic Grand Prix at Lime Rock Park in May 2009.

=== Formula 1 ===
The brand was the title sponsor of Walter Wolf Racing, which ran for two years between 1977 and 1979.

== Markets ==
Walter Wolf cigarettes were or are still sold in Austria, Slovenia, Croatia, Bosnia and Herzegovina, Serbia and Bulgaria.

== See also ==
- Tobacco smoking
- Drina (cigarette)
- Elita (cigarette)
- Filter 57 (cigarette)
- Jadran (cigarette)
- Laika (cigarette)
- Lovćen (cigarette)
- Morava (cigarette)
- Partner (cigarette)
- Smart (cigarette)
- Time (cigarette)
- Sobranie
- Jin Ling
- LD (cigarette)
