= Lovćen (cigarette) =

Montenegrin cigarette brand

- An old Montenegrin pack of Lovćen cigarettes.
- Product type: Cigarette
- Current owner: Duvanski Kombinat Podgorica
- Produced by: Duvanski Kombinat Podgorica
- Country: Montenegro
- Markets: Yugoslavia, Socialist Republic of Montenegro, Montenegro
- Previous owners: Duvanski Kombinat Titograd

Lovćen is a Montenegrin brand of cigarettes, currently owned and manufactured by the Duvanski Kombinat Podgorica in Cetinjski Put, Podgorica, Montenegro (formerly called the Duvanski Kombinat Titograd). The brand is named after the Lovćen mountain.

== History ==
Lovćen was created in the 1960s in the Socialist Republic of Montenegro (then part of Yugoslavia) it was also sold in neighbouring Serbian Republic. It has since survived the breakup of Yugoslavia and is still being sold today.

== Packaging ==
The pack features a white and red colour pattern, similar to that associated with Marlboro. The old, third variant Yugoslavian pack featured a red star, but it has since been removed. The Lovćen mountain is featured centrally, with the words "King Size" written in a golden font underneath, followed by the brand name and (depending on the variant) either Lux or Selected Fine Tobaccos below this.

== Controversy ==
In 2016, there were various reports that old Lovćen cigarettes with a Yugoslavian tax stamp were sold by some retailers in Montenegro, despite the fact that these cigarettes were pulled from the market years ago. Various inspection controls were carried out, but no illegal cigarettes were found.

== Products ==
- Lovćen Traditional King Size
- Lovćen Traditional Lux King Size

== See also ==
- Tobacco smoking
- Drina (cigarette)
- Elita (cigarette)
- Filter 57 (cigarette)
- Jadran (cigarette)
- Laika (cigarette)
- Morava (cigarette)
- Partner (cigarette)
- Smart (cigarette)
- Time (cigarette)
- Sobranie
- Jin Ling
- LD (cigarette)
- Walter Wolf (cigarette)
