= Jin Ling =

Russian cigarette brands

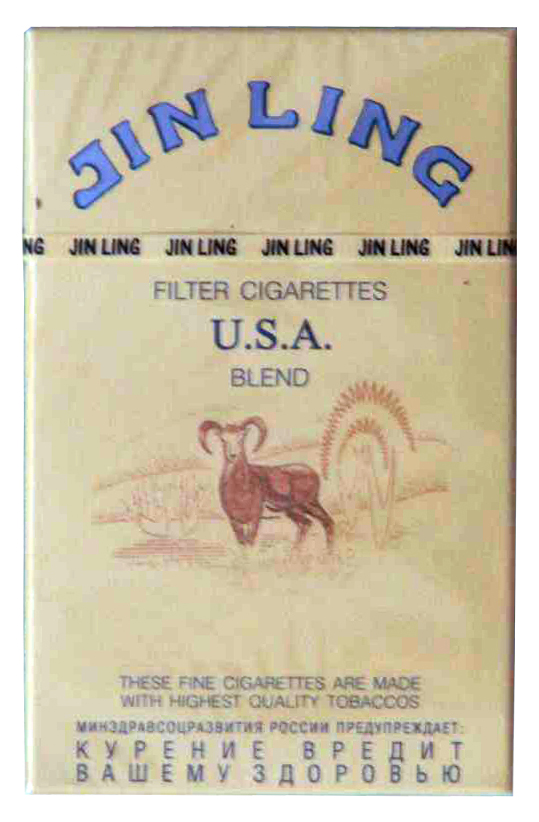
- An old Russian pack of Jin Ling cigarettes, with a Russian text warning at the bottom of the pack.
- Product type: Cigarette
- Produced by: Baltic Tobacco Company
- Country: Russia (alleged)
- Introduced: 1997; 29 years ago
- Markets: Ukraine, Russia, China and everywhere else

Jin Ling is a Russian brand of cigarettes, currently owned and manufactured by the Kaliningrad-based manufacturer Baltic Tobacco Company (Russian: Балтийская табачная фабрика, BTC). Other places where this brand is manufactured include Ukraine, Moldova, Cyprus and the United Arab Emirates.

== History ==
The name is derived from Jinling, the older name of Nanjing, where the brand was originally developed by the Chinese state-owned Nanjing Tobacco Factory. After the brand died out, the Baltic Tobacco Company re-introduced it in 1997.

The packet design resembles the American brand Camel in colour, typeface and layout, but instead of a camel, it features a mouflon. Jin Ling cigarettes are only sold illegally and the brand is the first to be designed explicitly for smuggling. It has been reported by customs officials as the "most seized" brand in Europe; in 2007, 258 million Jin Ling cigarettes were seized by authorities in EU countries. In 2017, during a bust by the North East Lincolnshire Council Trading Standards officers, a red variant of Jin Ling cigarettes was discovered. Previous Jin Ling cigarettes only had a yellow colour.

There are 19 factories in Russia where Jin Ling is produced, but there are also factories in Ukraine and Moldova. Some of these factories may be acting as a franchise, but the Jin Ling brand is also licensed to other manufacturers.

== Controversies ==
In May 2010, the German tabloid Berliner Kurier reported that fake Jin Ling were being made, which were no longer distinguishable from the genuine, and which could include feathers, mites, wood, pesticides, mold spores, rat droppings and other pollutants, because they were manufactured under very poor production conditions.

In April 2014 the cigarette was linked to a house fire in Spalding in which a 71-year-old woman, June Buffham, had died. Emma Milligan, a Trading Standards Officer at Lincolnshire County Council, said: "Jin Ling cigarettes are so dangerous because they don't go out when not actively being smoked, potentially causing a horrendous house fire, like the case here."

== See also ==
- Smoking in Russia
- Tobacco smoking
- Drina (cigarette)
- Elita (cigarette)
- Filter 57 (cigarette)
- Jadran (cigarette)
- Laika (cigarette)
- Lovćen (cigarette)
- Morava (cigarette)
- Partner (cigarette)
- Smart (cigarette)
- Time (cigarette)
- Sobranie
- LD (cigarette)
- Walter Wolf (cigarette)
