= Time (cigarette) =

Israeli cigarette brand

- An old Israeli pack of Time cigarettes.
- Product type: Cigarette
- Current owner: Dubek
- Produced by: Dubek
- Country: Israel
- Introduced: 1965; 61 years ago
- Markets: See Markets

Time (Hebrew: טיים) is an Israeli brand of cigarettes, currently owned and manufactured by Dubek.

== History ==
The Time brand, first launched in 1965, is the most popular cigarette brand in Israel. It is an American blend cigarette, available in two lengths: 80 mm and 100 mm.

In March 2013, it was reported that Dubek contacted Ben Ezra, the Kosher supervisor, to approve their brands (which are Noblesse, Time and Golf) as Kosher for Passover. During the holiday, Jewish law forbids Chametz – anything consisting of grains that may have come in contact with water, starting the process of fermentation. Some Jews, including many who are not religiously observant the rest of the year, spend weeks before Passover cleaning their homes and belongings to rid them of any morsel of food considered to be Chametz.

In January 2015, as taxes on cigarettes were increased in Israel, Time cigarettes sales were significantly reduced as consumers chose to buy cheaper brands.

== Marketing ==
Some adverts were made to promote Time cigarettes in Egypt.

A Time sponsored clock was also created.

== Markets ==
Time is mainly sold in Israel, but also was or still is sold in Luxembourg, Finland, France, Switzerland, Hungary, India and Argentina.

== Products ==
- TIME Red: An American blend, full flavor, available in two lengths: 80 mm, 100 mm.
- TIME Blue: An American blend, refined flavor, available in two lengths: 80 mm, 100 mm.

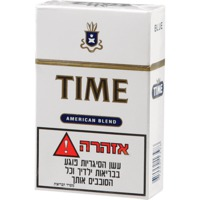
An Israeli pack of Time Blue cigarettes with a text warning

== See also ==
- Dubek
- Drina (cigarette)
- Elita (cigarette)
- Filter 57 (cigarette)
- Jadran (cigarette)
- Laika (cigarette)
- Lovćen (cigarette)
- Morava (cigarette)
- Partner (cigarette)
- Smart (cigarette)
- Sobranie
- Jin Ling
- LD (cigarette)
- Walter Wolf (cigarette)
- Tobacco smoking
