= Drina (cigarette) =

Bosnian cigarette brand

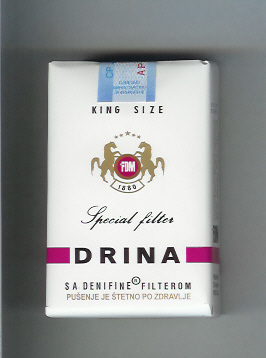
- An old Bosnian pack of Drina cigarettes, with a Bosnian text warning at the bottom of the pack.
- Product type: Cigarette
- Current owner: Sarajevo Tobacco Factory
- Country: Bosnia and Herzegovina
- Markets: See Markets

Drina is a Bosnian brand of cigarettes, currently owned and manufactured by the Sarajevo Tobacco Factory. The brand is named after the Drina river, which forms a part of the international border between Serbia and Bosnia and Herzegovina.

== History ==
The brand was founded after the end of World War II in the Socialist Republic of Bosnia and Herzegovina, and quickly became one of the most popular cigarette brands in Yugoslavia, similar to brands such as Morava and Drava. The brand is one of the few ex-Yugoslavian cigarette brands that survived the breakup of Yugoslavia and is still sold today, being the best-selling in Bosnia and Herzegovina. The brand is unique as it uses special Ravnjak tobacco instead of traditional Virginia or Burley tobacco.

== Markets ==
Drina was or still is being sold in the following countries: Switzerland, Austro-Hungarian Bosnia, Monarchist Yugoslavia, Titoist Yugoslavia, Socialist Republic of Croatia, Socialist Serbia, Serbia and Montenegro, Serbia, Socialist Republic of Bosnia and Herzegovina, Republic of Bosnia and Herzegovina, and Bosnia and Herzegovina after Dayton.

== Variants ==
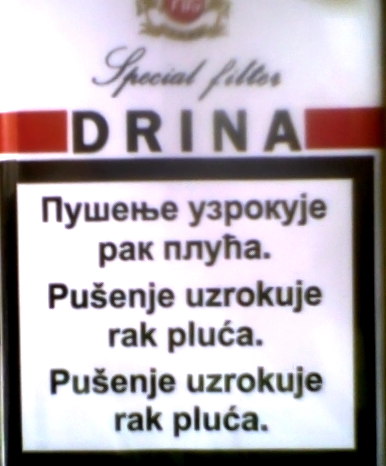
Drina, a current pack with a warning label in Bosnian, Croatian and Serbian

- Drina Denifine
- Drina Jedina
- Drina Gold
- Drina Silver

Below are all the current brands of Drina cigarettes sold, with the levels of tar, nicotine and carbon monoxide included.

Pack	Tar	Nicotine	Carbon monoxide
Drina Denifine	10 mg	0,9 mg	10 mg
Drina Jedina	10 mg	0,8 mg	10 mg
Drina Gold	8 mg	0,6 mg	10 mg
Drina Silver	4 mg	0,4 mg	6 mg

== See also ==
- Tobacco smoking
- Elita (cigarette)
- Filter 57 (cigarette)
- Jadran (cigarette)
- Laika (cigarette)
- Lovćen (cigarette)
- Morava (cigarette)
- Partner (cigarette)
- Smart (cigarette)
- Time (cigarette)
- Sobranie
- Jin Ling
- LD (cigarette)
- Walter Wolf (cigarette)
