= Drina (disambiguation) =

The Drina is a river in Bosnia and Herzegovina and Serbia.

Drina may also refer to:

- Drina Banovina, a province of the Kingdom of Yugoslavia 1929–1941
- Drina (Višegrad), a village in Bosnia and Herzegovina
- Drina (župa), a medieval country in the Drina valley
- Drina (butterfly), a genus of butterflies
  - Drina donina or the brown yamfly
- Drina (cigarette), a Bosnian brand
- Drina niška (cigarette), a Serbian brand
- FK Drina HE Višegrad, a Bosnian football club
- FK Drina Zvornik, a Bosnian football club
- Drina series, a series of children's novels by Mabel Esther Allan writing as Jean Estoril
- A brand name of co-cyprindiol (cyproterone acetate/ethinylestradiol), an oral contraceptive

== See also ==
- Not to be confused with rivers in Albania, the Drin and the Drino
