= LD (cigarette) =

Russian cigarette brand

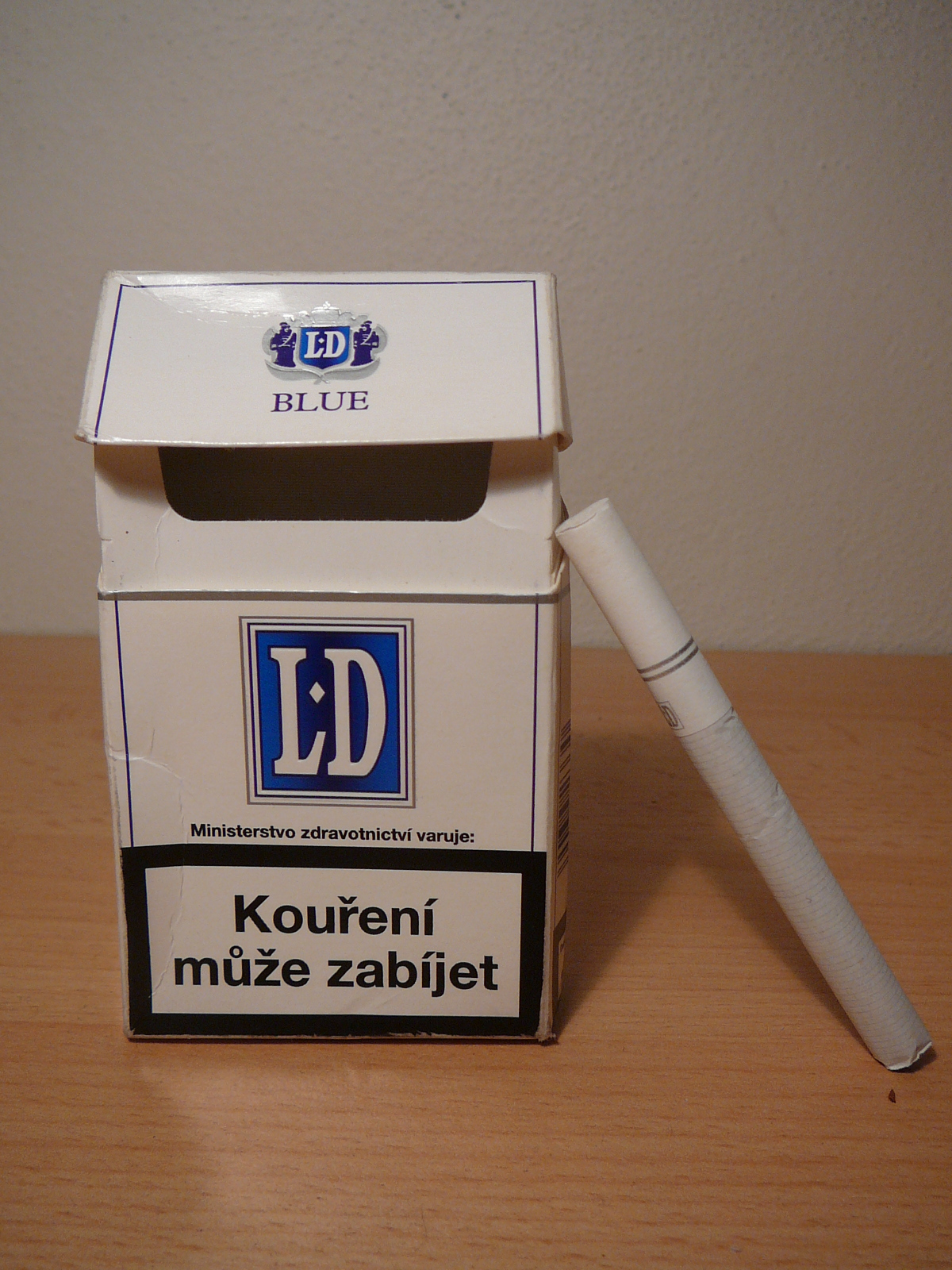
- An old Czech pack of LD cigarettes, with a Czech text warning at the bottom of the pack
- Product type: Cigarette
- Current owner: Japan Tobacco
- Introduced: 1999; 27 years ago
- Discontinued: Yes
- Markets: See Markets
- Previous owners: Liggett Ducat, Gallaher Group

LD (short for Liggett Ducat, the name of the original manufacturer) is an international brand of cigarettes, currently owned by Japan Tobacco. It is manufactured in Turkey by JT International U.S.A. for the United States market.

== History ==
LD was first launched in Jamaica in 1999, and by the following year it commanded 50 percent of the country's cheap cigarette market, and 17 percent of all cigarettes in Russia. Liggett Ducat was bought in 2000 by the Gallaher Group, which in turn was acquired by Japan Tobacco International (JTI) in 2007. The original Liggett Ducat factory in Moscow where LD was manufactured, was shut down in 2016. Later LD was manufactured in Saudi Arabia in 2020

In 2016, JTI announced it would introduce the LD brand on the United States cigarette market with the Red, Silver, and Menthol (Green) varieties. The brand would become a discount brand and would have a $2.81-a-pack price tag. It aimed to challenge discount brands such as L&M, which cost $3.69, and Pall Mall which cost $3.49. LD was introduced in North Carolina and South Carolina to act as a test market, with plans to expand if successful.

Beyond Russia and the United States, the brand has been sold in other global markets, including but not limited to Austria, Poland, Hungary, the Czech Republic, Serbia, Estonia, Latvia, Lithuania, Belarus, Ukraine, Kazakhstan, South Africa, Romania, Mongolia, Taiwan, and Jordan. It has also recently launched in Bangladesh.

== See also ==
- Tobacco smoking
- Drina (cigarette)
- Elita (cigarette)
- Filter 57 (cigarette)
- Jadran (cigarette)
- Laika (cigarette)
- Lovćen (cigarette)
- Morava (cigarette)
- Partner (cigarette)
- Smart (cigarette)
- Time (cigarette)
- Sobranie
- Jin Ling
- Walter Wolf (cigarette)
