= Sobranie (disambiguation) =

Sobranie (Cyrillic: Собрание) is a word in several Slavic languages for parliament, and can refer to:

- Assembly of the Republic of North Macedonia
- National Assembly of Bulgaria
- Federal Assembly of Russia
- Russian Constituent Assembly, which governed Russia briefly in 1918
- Sobranie, a brand of cigarettes
