= Java (cigarette) =

Russian cigarette brand

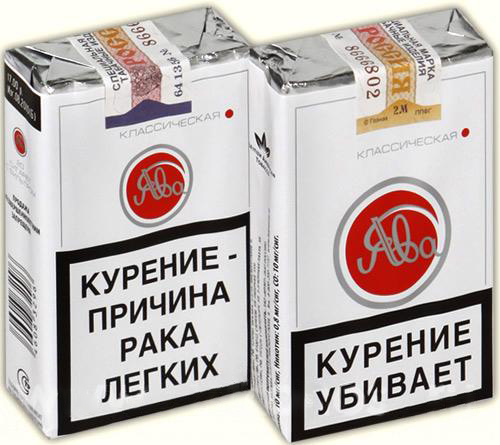
- Two packs of Java Classic cigarettes with warning messages on the front and back.
- Product type: Cigarette
- Current owner: British American Tobacco Russia
- Produced by: British American Tobacco Russia
- Country: Russia
- Introduced: 1912; 114 years ago (papirosas) 1956; 70 years ago (cigarettes)
- Markets: See § Markets
- Tagline: Russian: Новое время. Дух озарения. «Явы» дым табачный вдохновения., lit. 'New time. A spirit of illumination. "Java" smoke is tobacco inspiration.' Russian: «Ява» явская, lit. 'Java "Java"'; Russian: «Ява» — наш характер, lit. '"Java" is our character'

Java (Russian: Ява, romanized: Yava) is a Russian brand of cigarettes launched in 1966, currently owned and manufactured by British American Tobacco Russia, a subsidiary of British American Tobacco.

== History ==
The Java brand was established in 1912. In 1966 was the first in the Soviet Union to produce filtered cigarettes.

The composition of Java cigarettes included Indonesian tobacco from the island of Java. Today tobacco varieties are used in various parts of the world. For example, the supply of tobacco is carried out by Brazilian companies for growing tobacco, American, etc. The cigarettes are relatively cheap, but this does not affect the quality.

Java comes in four varieties: regular Java, Java New (Novaya), Java Gold (Zolotaya), and Java Export. A pack of Java cigarettes contains 24 mg (0.37 gr) of tar and 1.1 mg (0.017 gr) of nicotine.

Java Gold was released in 1997.

In 2000, British American Tobacco Russia developed a new variant: Java Gold Original. In May 2011, the Java Gold family was supplemented with new variations: Java Gold Turbo with a filter-mouthpiece, and after it in December there was a new variant, Java Gold Ultra Turbo.

In 2009, the Java brand entered the Forbes 50 top largest brands of Russia, and was ranked 9th over all among cigarette brands. Since January 2008, sales of Java Export have started in Russia.

In 2016, it was reported that Java cigarettes hold a 5% market share in Russia.

=== Java tobacco factory ===
In 1856, the Karaite merchant Samuel Gabay, who moved to Moscow from Kharkov in the mid-19th century, founded a tobacco factory in Moscow, which was then called the S. Gabay Tobacco Factory Partnership. The production of the factory was popular, and the business developed successfully.

In 1912, the factory established the production of cigarettes from tobacco, brought from the Indonesian island of Java. The product was called Java. After the October Revolution, the factory became state property, but it continued to work constantly. It did not stop during the Russian Civil War. In 1920, the factory produced cigarettes of the highest and first grades, as well as other types of tobacco products.

In 1922, in honor of popular cigarettes, the factory was officially named Java. By this time, Java acquired the status of a socially significant symbol, and, apparently, lost its essence in the form of foreign raw materials for production. With these cigarettes, smokers were associated with a new time, a revolutionary spirit.

From 1927 to 1928, Mosselprom issued a total of 8 billion cigarettes, of which nearly a third accounted for Java.

The fighting on the Eastern Front during World War II once again showed that the Java factory is not just a producer of cigarettes for the state, but a national treasure. Despite the daily air raids in the first months of the German invasion, the factory did not stop working. In September 1941, most of the facilities were evacuated to Cheboksary and Saratov.

The end of World War II was a new stage in the development of the enterprise, despite the fact that much had to be restored. The German trophy machines for cutting tobacco were brought to Moscow at the Java factory. In 1947, the country saw the first cigarettes with a filter in the history of Russia's tobacco industry.

In the Soviet Union, the 100 mm long variant Java 100 was also produced.

By the 1960s, state investments in the development and installation of new production lines, as well as the training program for factory workers, produced a logical result: the Java factory became one of the leading tobacco enterprises in the country. In 1965, Java became the first Soviet cigarette with a filter of international standard King Size.

The popularity of Java products prompted other factories to produce similar cigarettes with the same brand name. However, the most popular was still the original "Java" brand.

After the dissolution of the Soviet Union, the factory Java was privatized. In 1994, a controlling stake was acquired by British American Tobacco. In 1997, keeping the classic brand, the company launched a full-scale and a new one – Java Gold.

== Markets ==
Java is mainly sold in Russia, but also was or still is sold in Belarus and Azerbaijan.

== See also ==
- Smoking in Russia
- Tobacco smoking
- Java
