= Smoking in Russia =

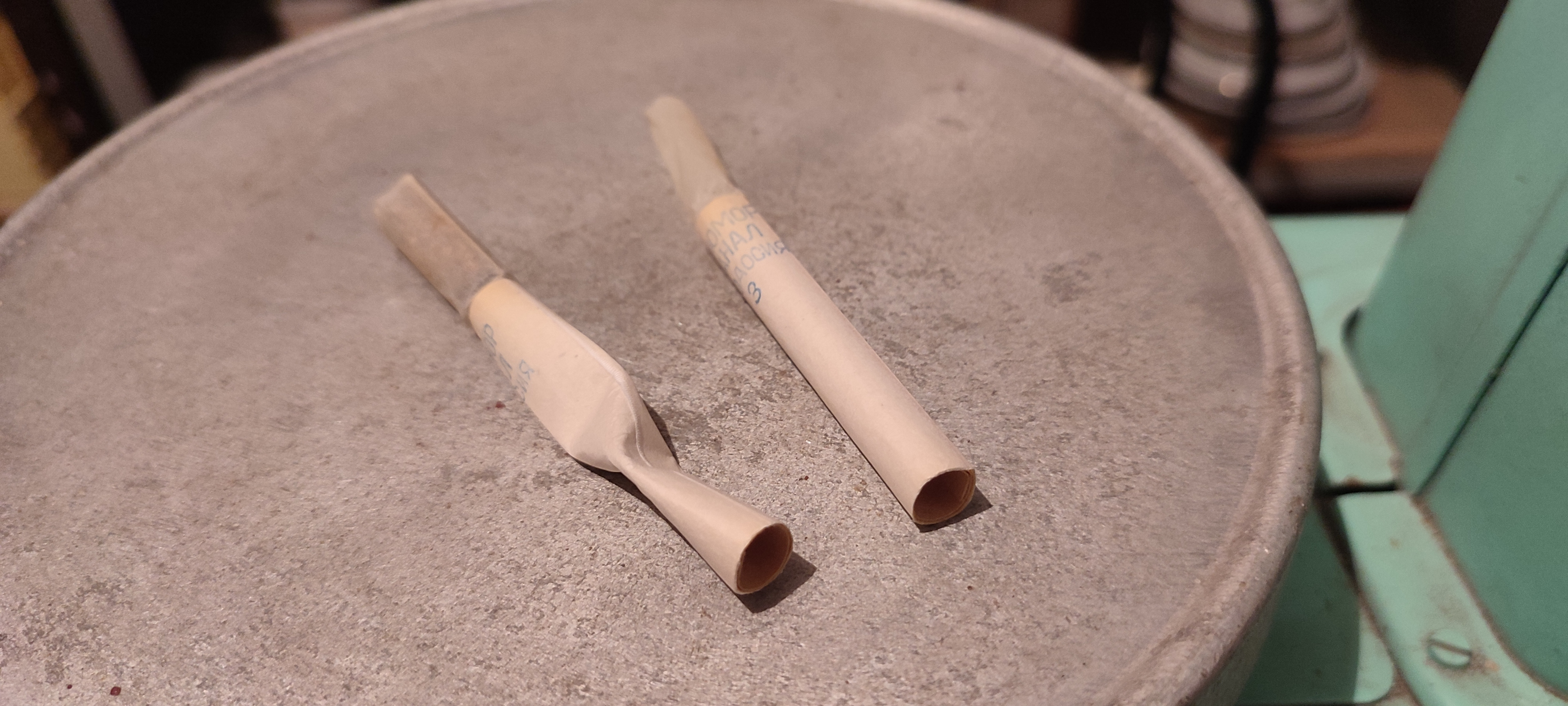
Traditional unfiltered papirosa cigarettes found in Russia and other post-Soviet states

Per capita tobacco smoking rates in Russia have historically ranked among the highest in the world, making the country a prized market for tobacco companies facing declining growth across the heavily regulated Western world. Russia was the fourth-largest consumer of cigarettes, with an annual consumption of about 400,000,000,000. In 2012, approximately 44,000,000 Russians were smokers, or about 40% of the population (60% were men and 22% were women). Since then, Russian smoking rates have fallen significantly, in part due to aggressive tobacco control reforms implemented by the Putin administration in the early 2010s. As of 2024, 18.6% of the Russian population are daily smokers.

According to the Public Chamber of Russia, smoking kills around 400,000 Russians per year. Smoking-related deaths cost the Russian economy about 3% of its annual GDP, amounting to $36,000,000,000.

== Smoking in the Russian Empire ==
Share of the Russian Tobacco Company Ltd., issued 17 August 1915

English merchants first introduced tobacco to Russia in the 1560s. In 1634, the patriarch of Russia condemned smoking and snuff as a mortal sin, and the Tsar criminalised usage. Offenders risked whippings and nose slitting, or even the death penalty. The ban was not well enforced; Tobacco steadily became more popular in elite circles. In the 1690s, Peter the Great repealed the ban, and sold monopoly rights to an English company to import and sell Virginia tobacco. The imperial court now hailed smoking as a welcome sign of development and Westernisation.

Russians smoked the papirosa, a hollow cardboard tube, extended by a thin paper tube which the user fills with tobacco. The cardboard tube acts as a holder. Tobacco consumption expanded thanks to the reforms of Tsar Alexander II in the 1860s and 1870s, especially the emancipation of the serfs and the modernisation of the military. Thereby tobacco went from a minor product of occasional use to become a mainstay of Russian identity by 1914, when the average urban male smoked a pack of papirosa a day. This happened despite the hostility of the established church, which taught that smoking contradicted Russian Orthodox traditions. Peasants in Ukraine grew tobacco on their small plots. Very harsh working conditions for the women and children who worked in the papirosa factories sparked labor unrest in 1905 and 1917.

== Smoking in the Soviet Union ==
Although the Soviet regime condemned tobacco use, smoking continued to grow in popularity and spread throughout the country. More women took up smoking. The unique style of papirosa smoking flourished and had broad cultural, social, and gendered consequences. According to Tricia A. Starks, the Soviet Union launched an anti-smoking campaign in the 1920s carried out by the Communist Party on a national scale. It was led by Nikolai Semashko in his role as Commissar of Public Health. The programme sought with little success to reduce tobacco cultivation and production. However, it did launch an intense propaganda attack against tobacco. The campaign was highly innovative in its approach to anti-smoking propaganda and treatment programmes. These initiatives involved the mass distribution of anti-smoking materials such as posters, pamphlets, articles, plays, and films, alongside the implementation of special state-sponsored smoking cessation programs that claimed high success rates.

== Smoking in the Russian Federation ==
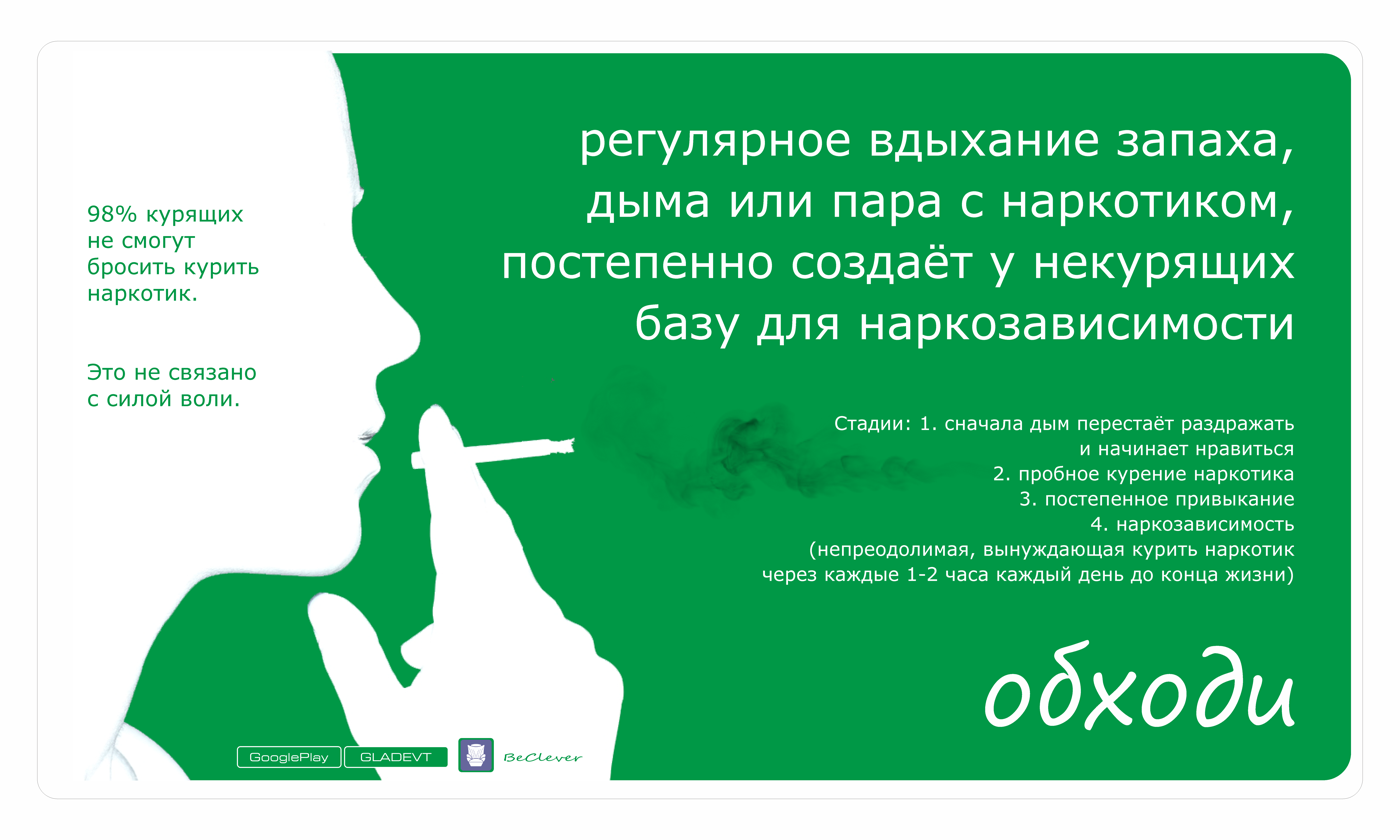
Russian-language warning about the dangers of passive smoking

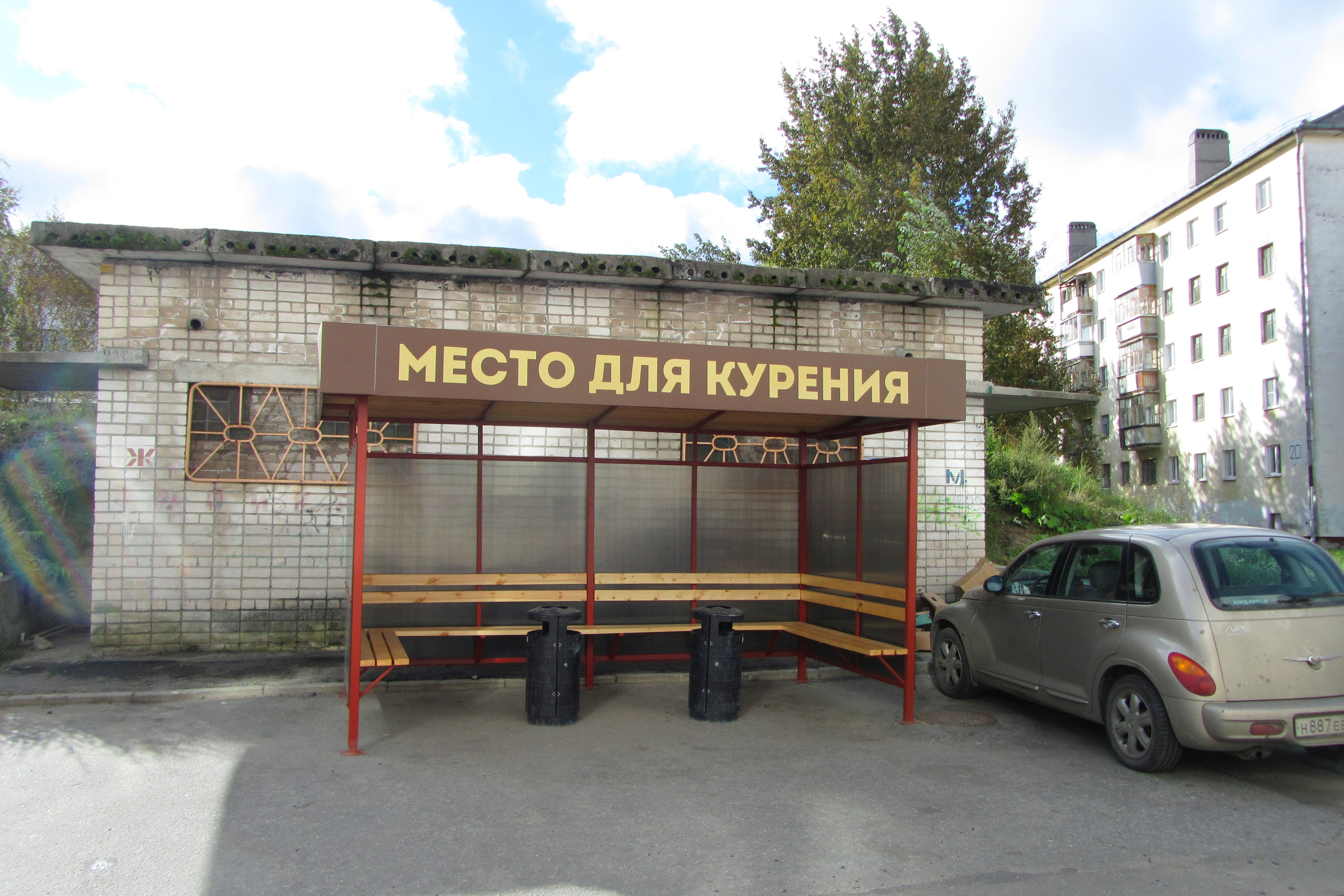
Outdoor smoking shelter in Severodvinsk

Following the collapse of the Soviet Union in the early-1990s, there was a summer-long cigarette shortage which led to public outrage and protests in major cities. In Moscow, the city council decided to ration sales to half a pack of cigarettes per day. The shortage was caused when half of all the cigarette factories in the country were closed for repair, and imports from Bulgaria plunged. President Gorbachev pleaded with Washington for help, and the largest American tobacco companies hurriedly made plans to ship 34,000,000,000 cigarettes to Russia, at $1 per pack. The crisis eased and a new opportunity emerged. As Communism collapsed in Eastern Europe and the USSR, 1989-91, Philip Morris, R.J. Reynolds and Reemtsma (the main German firm) moved in and bought out 75% of the old tobacco industry. Marlboro and the other Western brands replaced the old papirosa, with a plentiful supply and a massive advertising campaign. They were welcomed as "liberators."

As of 2025, the regions with the highest rates of smoking are in the Far Eastern Federal District—with the highest in the Jewish Autonomous Oblast at 34.4%, followed by the Amur Oblast at 28.8%, Buryatia at 27.7%, Tuva at 27.1%, and the Altai Republic at 26.9%. The regions with the lowest smoking rates are primarily in the North Caucasian Federal District—with the lowest in Chechnya at 0.2%, followed by Ingushetia at 6.2%, Kabardino–Balkaria at 10.3%, and Karachay–Cherkessia at 11.2%.

=== 2013 smoking bans ===
In 2013, the government imposed bans on smoking in public places. According to the World Health Organization, per-capita smoking in Russia decreased by 20% between 2000-20.

== See also ==
- Alcohol in Russia
- Apollo-Soyuz (cigarette), a brand of cigarette
- Belomorkanal (Russian: Беломорканал) is a brand of cigarette
- Donskoy Tabak, Russia's fourth-largest cigarette manufacturer
- Java (cigarette), a brand of cigarette
- Jin Ling, a brand of cigarette
- Laika (cigarette), a brand of cigarette
- Prima, a brand of cigarette
