= Prima (cigarette) =

Russian cigarette brand

- An old Russian pack of Prima cigarettes, with a Russian text warning at the bottom of the pack.
- Product type: Cigarette
- Produced by: Kiev Tobacco Factory, various Russian tobacco manufacturers
- Country: Ukrainian Soviet Socialist Republic, Soviet Union
- Introduced: 1970; 56 years ago
- Markets: See Markets

Prima is a Russian brand of cigarettes that was manufactured at the Kiev Tobacco Factory in the Ukrainian Soviet Socialist Republic since 1970. Today, it is owned and manufactured in Russia by various tobacco manufacturers.

== History ==
Prima cigarettes were created by the leadership of the German Labor Front (DAF) during the occupation of Ukraine by Germany in the Second World War; the target market was guest workers. The package was painted with colors of Nazi symbols and the name was written in the German Blackletter font. In 1970, these cigarettes were produced again in the Soviet Union, becoming popular because of their low price (just 14 kopeyki) and the quality of their tobacco compared to another popular Russian brand, Belomorkanal. Prima cigarettes are now produced by a number of tobacco factories throughout Russia.

According to studies of the Russian tobacco market conducted in January–March 2016, Prima became the most counterfeited cigarette brand, accounting for 44% of the total volume of counterfeit products. Cigarettes of this brand produced illegally were sold at prices ranging from 25 to 38 rubles per pack (data from the website of the Federal Customs Service indicate that legal Prima cigarettes were priced at approximately this level in 2013). In 2016, the officially registered maximum retail prices for this brand from different manufacturers already ranged from 50 to 74 rubles per pack.

== Markets ==
Prima cigarettes were sold in the following countries: Moldova, Transnistria, the Estonian Soviet Socialist Republic, Latvia, Lithuania, the Byelorussian Soviet Socialist Republic, Belarus, Ukraine, the Soviet Union, Russia, Georgia, Armenia, Azerbaijan, Kazakhstan, Israel and Indonesia.

== See also ==
- Smoking in Russia
- Tobacco smoking
