= Philip Morris Operations =

Tobacco company in Niš, Serbia

- Native name: Филип Морис Операције
- Type: Joint-stock company
- Industry: Tobacco
- Founded: 11 June 2003; 23 years ago (Current form); Founded in 1930
- Headquarters: Niš, Serbia
- Area served: Serbia
- Key people: Aleksandar Jakovljević (General director)
- Revenue: ▼€175.70 million (2017)
- Net income: ▲€32.41 million (2017)
- Total assets: ▼€183.16 million (2017)
- Total equity: ▲€128.20 million (2017)
- Owner: Philip Morris International (99.69%); Others
- Number of employees: 604 (2017)
- Website: www.din.co.rs

Philip Morris Operations or Niš Tobacco Factory is a Serbian tobacco manufacturer based in Niš.

== History ==
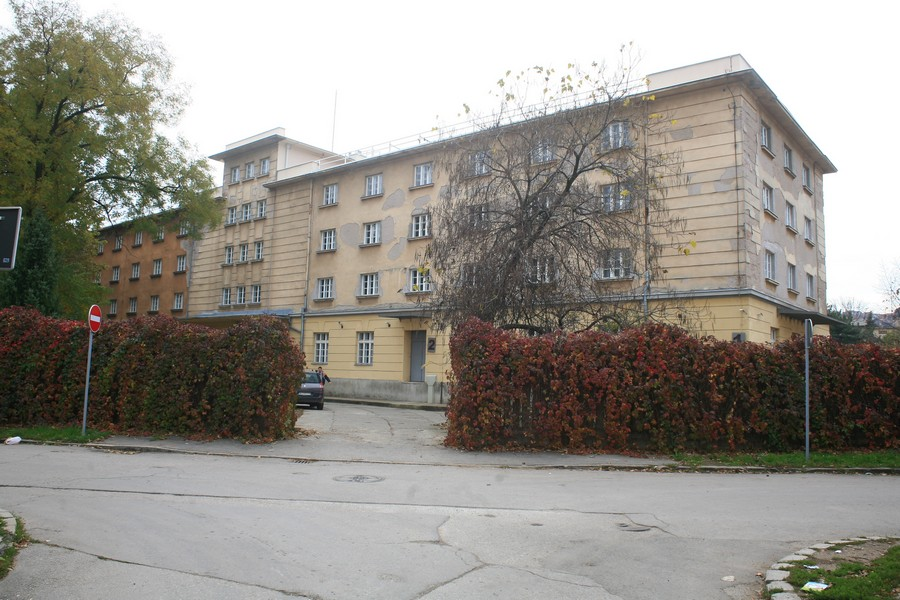
Monopol Building Niš

The Niš Tobacco Factory was established in 1930 as a part of the state tobacco monopoly at its present location in Crveni Krst neighborhood of Niš. It was one of the largest cigarette manufacturers in Yugoslavia. It offered a variety of services, including the production of processed tobacco, tobacco cut filler, filters and other.

During the 1990s, Niš Tobacco Factory had 3,500 employees and had tens of thousands cooperators in former Yugoslavia. In 1999, during the NATO bombing of Yugoslavia, the company's facilities were bombed, allegedly by request of Philip Morris International.

Niš Tobacco Factory was sold to Philip Morris in August 2003 for €518 million. It later changed name to Philip Morris Operations. In 2012, the workers union protested, alleging that Philip Morris has failed to transfer €387 million to the Government of Serbia and also significantly reduced production.

== Market and financial data ==
As of 19 December 2018, Philip Morris Operations has a market capitalization of 97.20 million euros.

== See also ==
- Morava (cigarette)
