= Dubek =

Dubek Ltd. דובק בע"מ
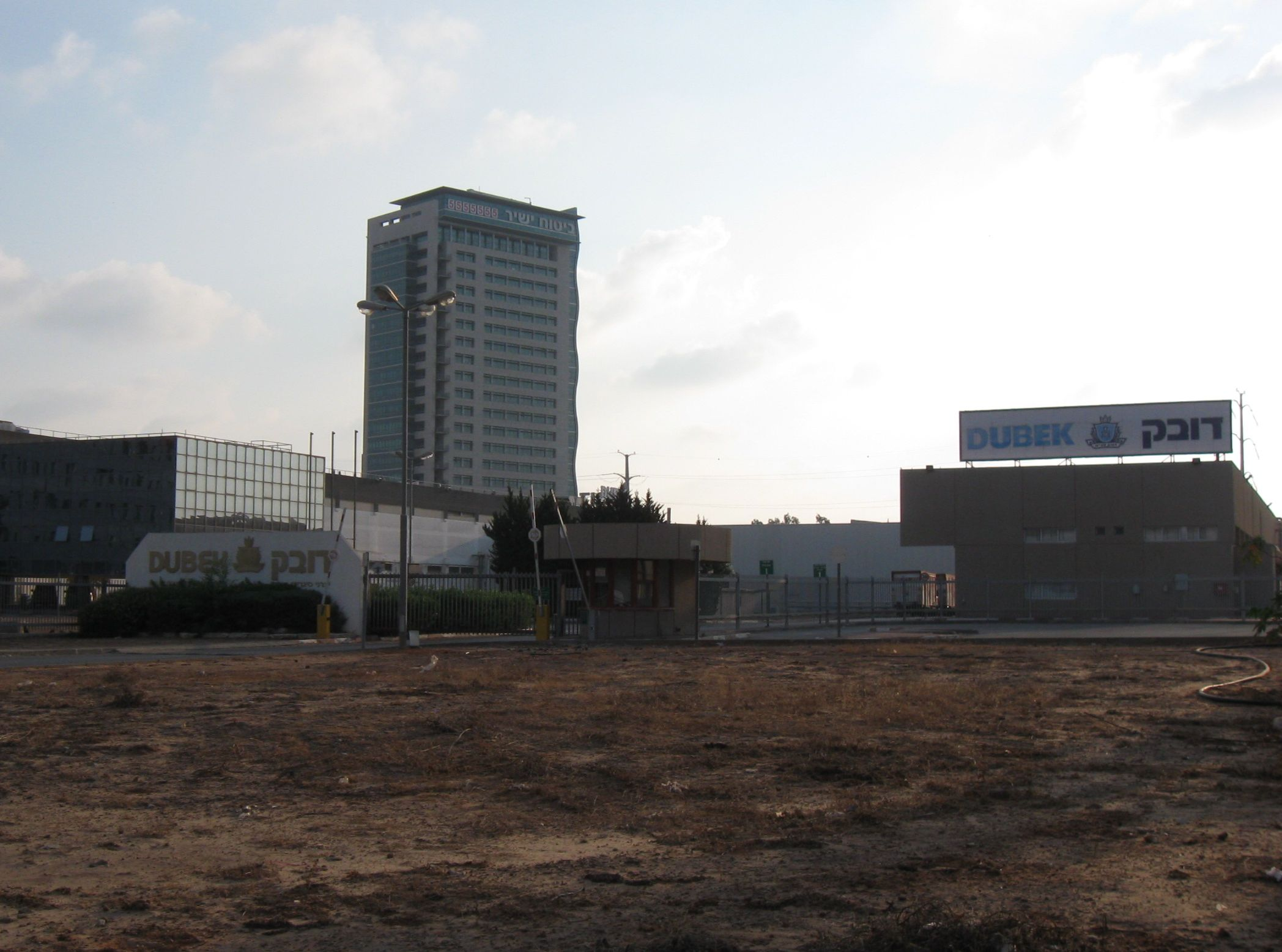
- Dubek headquarters in Petach Tikva
- Trade name: Dubek
- Industry: Tobacco
- Founded: 1935; 91 years ago
- Founder: Martin Gehl
- Headquarters: 9 Gehl Martin St., Kiryat Aryeh, Petah Tikva, Israel
- Key people: Roy Gehl (Chairman); Arie Zief (CEO)
- Number of employees: 300
- Website: www.dubek.co.il

Dubek Ltd. (Hebrew: דובק בע"מ), is the sole Israeli cigarette manufacturing company, headquartered in Petah Tikva. Established in 1935, the company produces, markets and distributes cigarettes, cigars, lighters and smoking devices and accessories in Israel, the Palestinian Authority, Gaza Strip, the West Bank, as well as overseas.

Dubek also imports and distributes tobacco products, cigars, electronic and stone lighters, rolling paper and energy drinks like Redbull and BLU. It markets and sells its products to large retail chain stores, local grocery shops, convenience stores and tobacco stores through sales and service representatives across Israel. Dubek's cigarettes do not contain chametz and kitniyot, and tobacco products are tested to be kosher for Passover and also all year round.

== History ==
A photograph of workers at the "DUBEK" cigarette factory, enjoying their lunch hour cigarette, A photograph taken on 9 January 1950.

Dubek was established in 1935 by Martin Gehl, a German-Jewish immigrant. In 1960, Dubek became one of the first companies to be publicly traded on the Tel Aviv Stock Exchange. Gehl and his son Zorach, expanded the business and took over all other cigarette manufacturers in Israel. In 2003 Dubek became a private company. Today the company is headed by Dr. Roy Gehl, Martin Gehl's grandson and its main offices are located in Petah Tikva on Martin Gehl Street, named for the company's founder.

=== Intersection with Israeli–Palestinian conflict ===
After victory in the 1948 war, the Israeli Ministry of Finance created the “Tobacco Leaf Organization for the Cigarette Industry” to redistribute 260 tons of confiscated Palestinian tobacco among the four Jewish‑owned Israeli factories, Maspero, Dubek, Bejarano and the Israeli Cigarette Co. Historian Basma Fahoum states that in doing so they deliberately excluded the Arab Cigarette & Tombac Co. of Nazareth that was still operating in Israel. Concurrently, Dubek alone was able to draw on state‑backed credit. Company filings show it pledging all plant and inventory in 1970 to secure IL 2.29 million in loans from the Industrial Development Bank of Israel and Bank Halvaʾa ve‑Hisachon, financing that Bank Hapoalim had refused to extend to Arab Cigarette & Tombac Co unless a Jewish guarantor was provided. An archived handwritten note found in the Prime Minister's Arab‑Affairs Adviser’s files explains that Bank Hapoalim refused credit due to a lack of a Jewish guarantor. Fahoum concludes that these parallel mechanisms, namely selective access to raw materials and industrial credit, formed part of a wider state policy that channelled subsidies to Jewish industry and, by extension, accelerated Dubek’s path to monopoly. A similar thesis is stated by other historians. A different perspective on the relationship between Dubek and the Palestinians is given by Israeli political scientist Aryeh Shalev. Shalev points out that some Palestinian activists opposed boycotting the company during the First Intifada because much of the raw materials for Dubek cigarettes were bought from Arab sources in the West Bank and Galilee.

== Operations ==
Dubek Ltd operates through its wholesalers, reaching over 10,000 retail outlets throughout the country ranging from the large supermarket down to the local grocery store and small kiosk. In addition to its activity in the local market, Dubek distributes its brands to regions under the control of the Palestinian Authority and manufactures "white labels" for customers overseas.

The distribution networks is operated by Dubek's Marketing division and deploys sales promotion initiatives as well as supervision by a sophisticated CRM system which enables real time control over availability, stock levels, visiting frequency and market activities.

== Brands ==
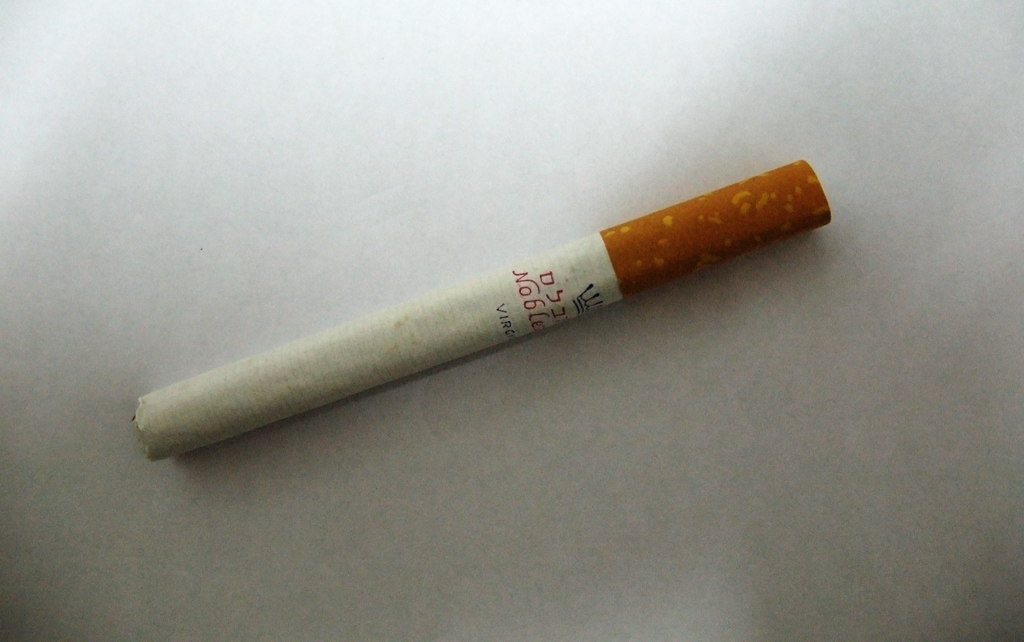
A Noblesse cigarette

- Time
- Noblesse
- Golf
- Highway
- Royal
- Mustang
- Nelson
- Sheraton
- Broadway
- Montana
- Europa
- Black Devil
- Maryland
- TLV

== See also ==
- Economy of Israel
- Smoking in Jewish law
