= Noblesse (cigarette) =

Israeli cigarette brand

- An old Israeli pack of Noblesse cigarettes
- Product type: Cigarette
- Current owner: Dubek
- Produced by: Dubek
- Country: Israel
- Introduced: 1952; 74 years ago
- Markets: See Markets

Noblesse (Hebrew: נובלס) is an Israeli brand of cigarettes, currently owned and manufactured by Dubek. The name "Noblesse" comes from the French term Noblesse oblige, which means "nobility obliges".

== History ==
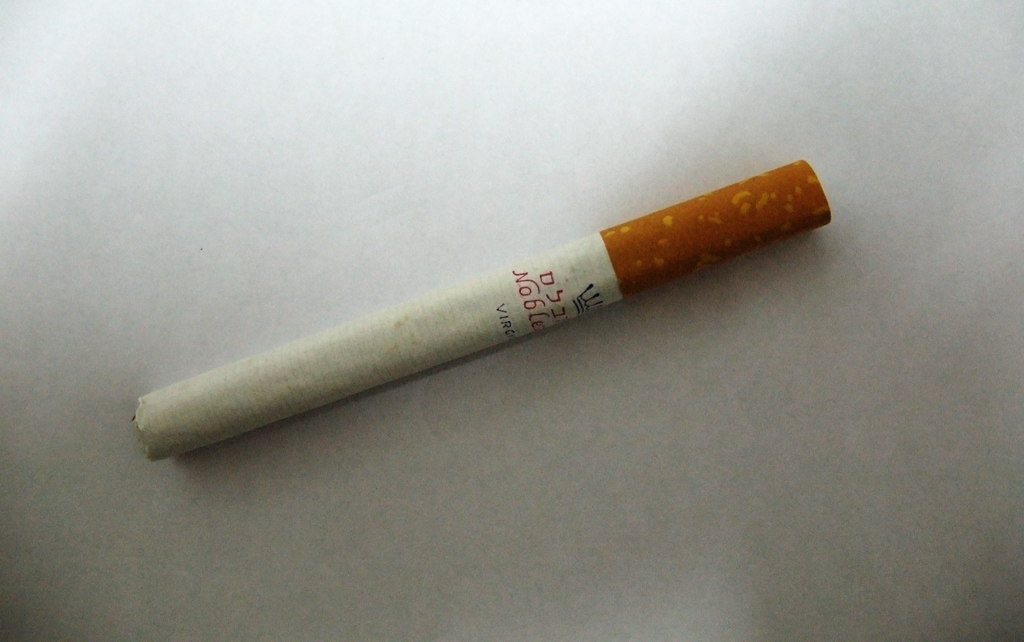
A Noblesse cigarette.

Noblesse was first launched in 1952 in a distinct green, 80mm, 'soft-pack' which has never been dramatically changed. It is the oldest in Dubek's product line. The cigarette also has the highest tar (19 mg) and nicotine (1.3 mg) amounts available on the Israeli cigarette market.

Despite Dubek's original plans to make Nobblesse cigarettes a premium priced cigarette, its cheap price made it popular with generations of soldiers, Kibbutzniks and even prisoners who wanted to smoke but not burn too much money. However, in more recent times, the Noblesse brand is barely smoked in the Israel Defense Forces anymore, as it holds a 1% sale rate amongst the soldiers and other brands like Marlboro and Camel have become more popular over the years.

Dubek has since made three additions to the Noblesse family: A lower nicotine/tar blend branded Noblesse Virginia Blend, an even lower nicotine/tar blend in a flip-top pack branded American Blue and Noblesse Golden Virginia. Noblesse cigarettes are also distributed or sold by the Israel Defense Forces to imprisoned soldiers within Israeli military prisons.

Noblesse cigarettes have a special place in the Israeli history, as a feature of young people who want to realize the values of the 1960s "Sex and drugs and rock and roll phase" Apparently this place was given to the brand due to the distribution of free Noblesse cigarettes in Kibbutz, which has become a feature of the youth and the Nahal.

In March 2013, it was reported that Dubek contacted Ben Ezra, the Kosher supervisor, to approve their brands (which are Noblesse, Time and Golf) as Kosher for Passover. During the holiday, Jewish law forbids Chametz – anything consisting of grains that may have come in contact with water, starting the process of fermentation. Some Jews, including many who are not religiously observant the rest of the year, spend weeks before Passover cleaning their homes and belongings to rid them of any morsel of food considered to be Chametz.

In January 2015, as taxes on cigarettes were increased in Israel, Noblesse cigarettes were sold significantly less as consumers chose to buy cheaper brands.

== Marketing ==
Noblesse has appeared in some Israeli newspapers via advertisements.

In 2015, limited edition packs were released, featuring a special camouflage pattern on all the pack variants.

== Markets ==
Noblesse is or was sold in Israel, the Netherlands, Denmark (As Nobless), Switzerland, Canada and Argentina.

== Products ==
- Noblesse Filter: Full flavor, length: 80 mm, available in soft pack
- Noblesse Golden Virginia: Medium flavor, length: 80 mm, available in soft pack
- Noblesse Blend: Refined flavor, length: 80 mm, available in soft pack

== See also ==
- Dubek
