= Cigarette tube =

Pre-rolled cigarette paper

Cigarette tubes are pre-rolled cigarette paper usually with an acetate or paper filter at the end. They have an appearance similar to a finished cigarette but are without any tobacco or smoking material inside. The length varies from what is known as King Size (84mm) to 100's (100mm).

The United States Tobacco Taxation Bureau defines a cigarette tube as "Cigarette paper made into a hollow cylinder for use in making cigarettes."

Filling a cigarette tube is usually done with a cigarette injector (also known as a shooter) or with filling machine. Russian old style papirosa cigarette tube can also be filled with cigarette stuffer . Cone shaped cigarette tubes are known as cones and can be filled using a packing stick or straw because of their cone shape. Cone smoking is popular because as the cigarette burns it tends to get stronger and stronger. A cone allows more tobacco to be burned at the beginning than the end, allowing for an even flavor

== See also ==
- Cigar tube
- Smoking in Russia
