= Apollo-Soyuz (cigarette) =

Soviet era Russian cigarette brand

- Product type: Cigarette
- Current owner: Altria
- Produced by: Java Tobacco; Philip Morris USA; Krasnodar Tobacco Factory
- Country: Soviet Union
- Introduced: July 1975
- Discontinued: 1980; 46 years ago
- Markets: Europe, U.S.

"Apollo-Soyuz" was a Soviet brand of cigarettes which were manufactured by the "Java Tobacco Factory" in Moscow, Soviet Union, and Philip Morris USA in the United States. Today it is owned and manufactured by the Krasnodar Tobacco Factory, a Russian subsidiary of Altria.

== History ==
To honor the joint Soviet-American flight of the Soyuz-Apollo, a series of postage stamps and envelopes with the stamp first day covers, postcards, photo albums, as well as cigarettes under the name "Apollo-Soyuz" with the famous Virginia tobacco from the American company Philip Morris were issued to be made.

The brand was introduced for the occasion of the joint Soviet-American Apollo–Soyuz Test Project mission in July 1975.

The cigarettes went on sale in the Soviet Union on July 15, 1975, the day the Soyuz was launched, and later in the United States. The cigarettes were manufactured for 5 years, during this time the Moscow factory released an order of 500 million cigarettes, although it was difficult to actually acquire a pack due to a trade deficit in the USSR. In the astronauts city Leninsk (nowadays called Baikonur) the cigarettes could be bought freely at 1.5 Rbls. 50kop. per pack (at the time this was considered quite expensive). In other cities of the USSR, the cigarettes were instantly bought and resold by speculators. The cigarettes were popular in the Soviet Union, a total of 3 billion were exported there. In the United States however, the brand found little appeal, mainly because the brand was expensive.

Manufacturing of the brand was discontinued in 1980 upon expiry of the term of the license agreement between Philip Morris and Glavtabak.

=== Resumption of production ===
Cigarette manufacturing resumed in 1995 by the Krasnodar Tobacco Factory, owned by Philip Morris. In 1996 the factory was arranged in a full technological cycle of production, and since then the cigarettes are manufactured there.

On July 17, 1998 the production of a new cigarette called "Apollo Alliance Special", which were more expensive than the original, was started. On April 1 of 2000, production began of the "Apollo Alliance Special Lights Bookstore" cigarettes (retail price per pack 9-10 roubles), who were claimed to be a low-tar and nicotine cigarettes (8 mg tar and 0.6 mg nicotine per cigarette).

== Packaging ==
The label design for the Soyuz–Apollo cigarettes was created by a participant in the Soyuz–Apollo mission, pilot-cosmonaut Alexei Leonov. The cigarette pack features a blue circle with a rendering of the docked Apollo-Soyuz spacecraft inside it, and bears English writing in blue and Russian in red. On one side it says: "Apollo Soyuz commemorative brand," and on the other "Soyuz Apollo". On one edge of the pack are the words, "Developed by Philip Morris Inc. U.S.A. and Glavtabak, U.S.S.R. in commemoration of U.S./Soviet space cooperation" in English and Russian, along with the English words, "Made in U.S.S.R., Tava Factory, Moscow." Glavtabak was the Soviet State Tobacco Agency. The other edge displays the U.S. Surgeon General's warning that cigarettes are dangerous to your health.

== Markets ==
Apollo-Soyuz was originally only sold in the Soviet Union and the United States. Since its re-introduction it is sold in Russia.

== In popular culture ==
=== Video games ===
Apollo-Soyuz cigarettes appeared in the game Escape from Tarkov where the brand is called "Apollon Soyuz".

== See also ==
- Tobacco smoking
- Apollo–Soyuz
- Smoking in Russia
