= Belomorkanal =

Russian cigarette brand

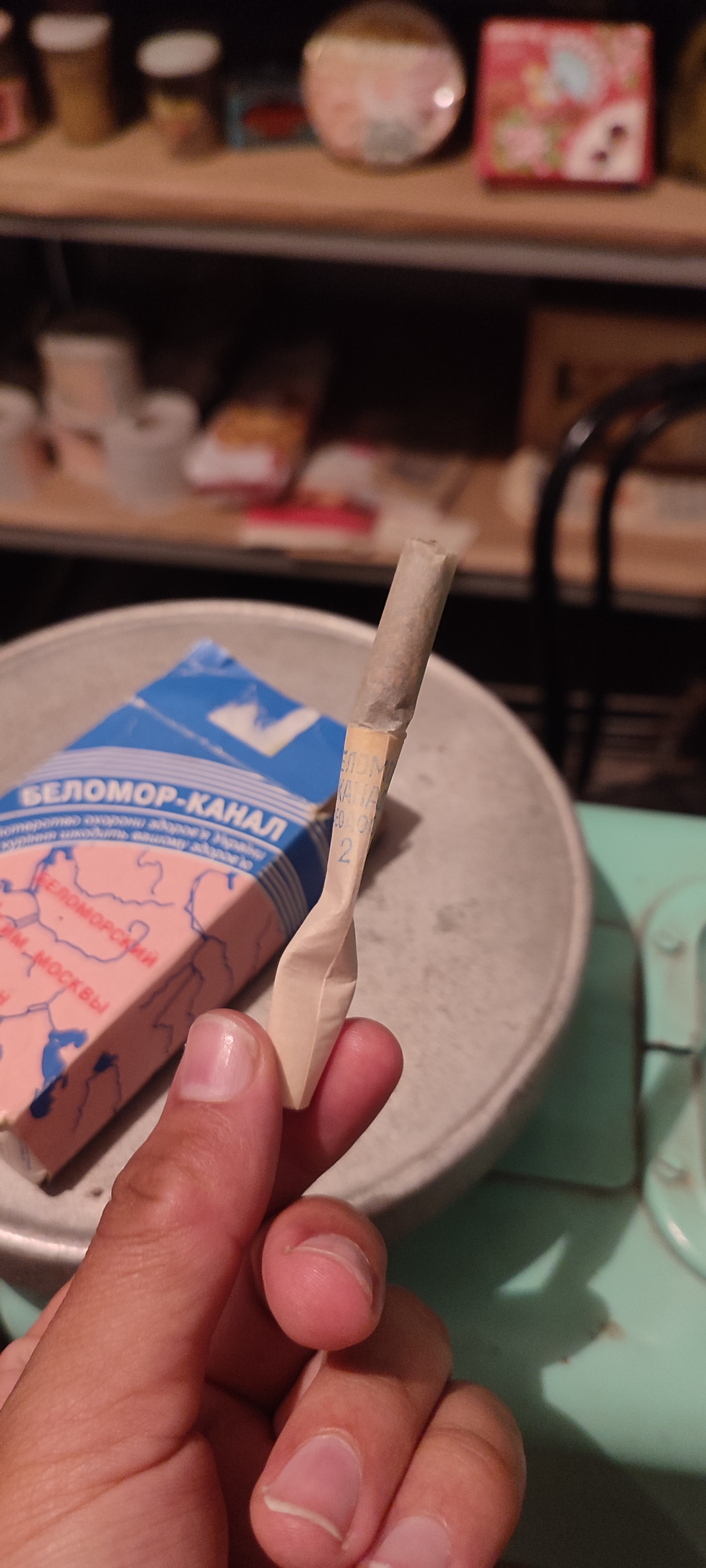
- Russian Belomorkanal cigarettes
- Product type: Cigarette
- Current owner: Uritsky Tobacco Factory
- Country: Leningrad, Soviet Union
- Introduced: 1932; 94 years ago
- Markets: See Markets

Belomorkanal (Russian: Беломорканал) is a Russian brand of papirosa (cigarettes), originally made by the Uritsky tobacco factory in Leningrad, Soviet Union.

== History ==
Belomorkanal was created in 1932 to commemorate the construction of the White Sea–Baltic Canal, also known as the Belomorkanal. Vasily Ioanidi, a process engineer, developed the tobacco blend, and Andrey Tarakanov drew the pack design.

Belomorkanal cigarettes are still produced in various post-Soviet republics, most notably in Russia, in Kamianets-Podilskyi (Ukraine), and in Hrodna (Belarus).

Belomorkanal is also used by cannabis users, wherein "emptied cigarettes are then filled with a mixture of tobacco and marijuana for smoking", with the cardboard tube serving as a built-in roach.

== Markets ==
Belomorkanal cigarettes were widely available in the Soviet Union. They are still sold in some post-Soviet states, including Russia, Belarus and Ukraine.

== In popular culture ==
In a 1985 song by Jan Krzysztof Kelus, the name of the cigarettes is compared to "Auschwitz Filters" due to the fact that many thousands of Gulag prisoners had died during the construction of the canal.

Nicolas Rothwell's 2013 novel Belomor takes its name from this cigarette.

== See also ==
- Smoking in Russia
