= Papirosa =

Cigarette design

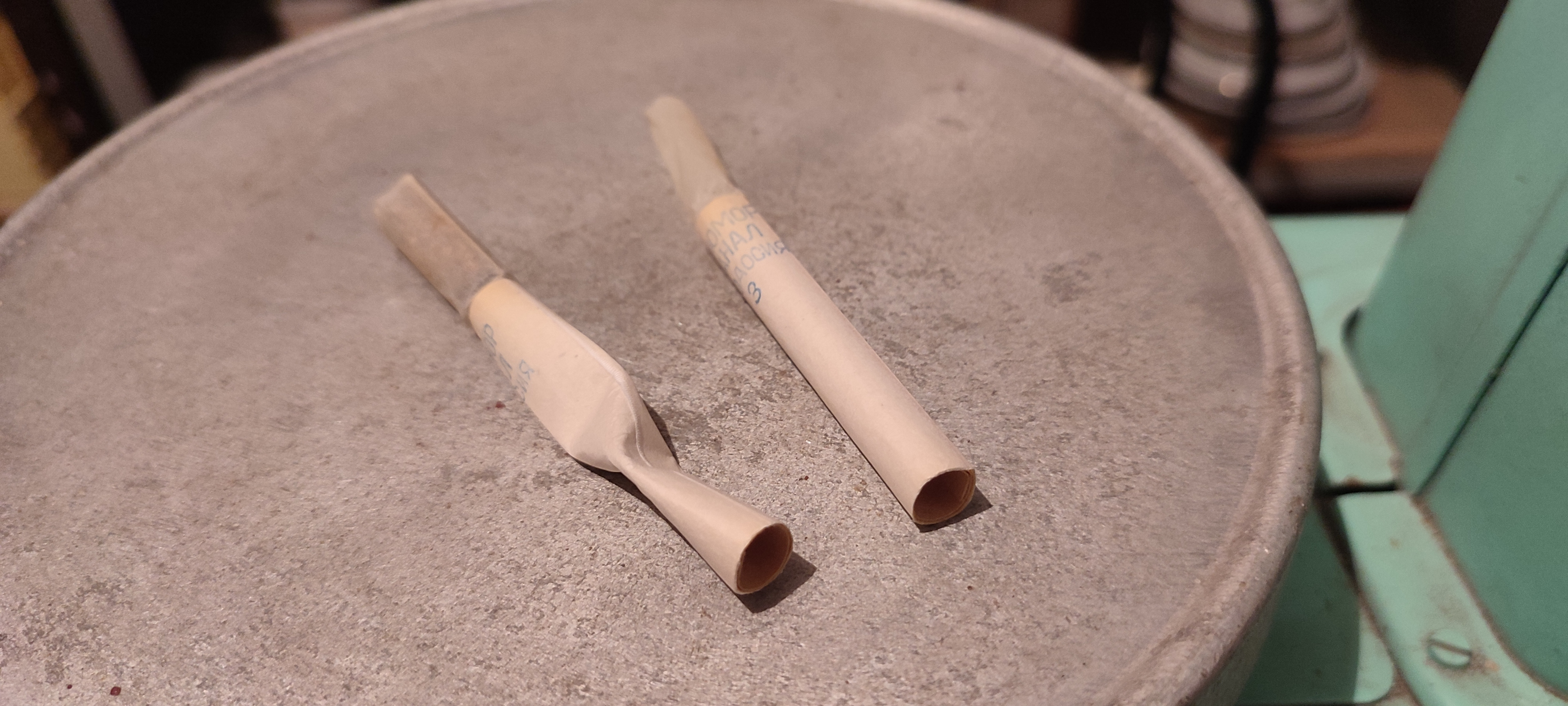
Two Belomorkanal papirosy, the left one with the carboard mouthpiece compressed in the typical manner before smoking

A papirosa (Russian: папироса, plural: papirosy) is an implement for tobacco smoking, a variant of filterless cigarettes. It consists of a hollow cardboard tube extended by a thin paper tube filled with tobacco. The cardboard tube acts as a cigarette holder and is called мундштук (mundshtuk) in Russian. This Russian term derives from the German word Mundstück (literally, "mouthpiece").

== Description ==
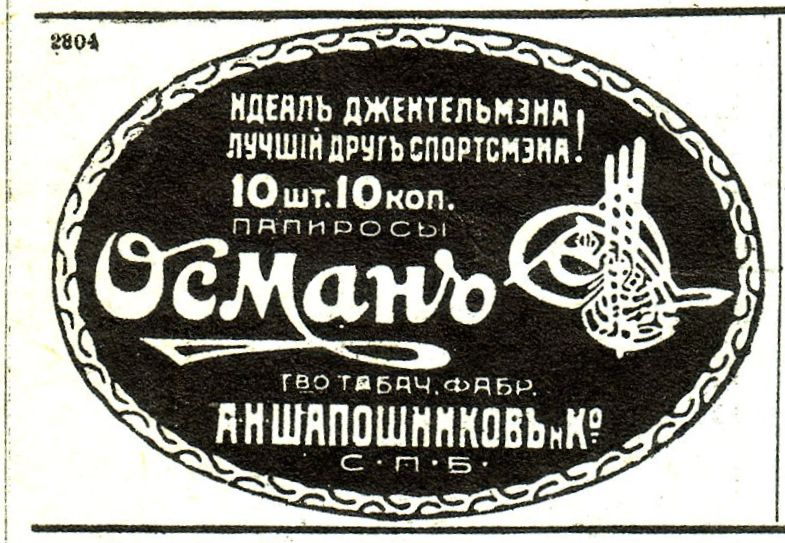
Osman pariposy. "Ideal for a gentleman, the best friend of a sportsman", 1914

Vasmer's Etymological Dictionary claims that the word is borrowed from Polish papieros for "cigarette", where it is a portmanteau word "papier-" ("paper") + "-ros", the tail of "cigarros".

The inner end of the mouthpiece is cut into dents which are bent to keep tobacco from travelling into the mouth. Modern papirosy can also contain a filter inside the mouthpiece.

The two paper tubes: the mouthpiece and the tube for tobacco are called together "(papirosa) sleeve" (Russian: Гильза папиросы). Papirosa sleeves may be sold separately to be filled with tobacco of choice using a special device, cigarette stuffer (Russian: набивочная машинка); the latter may also be used for stuffing any kind of cigarette tubes.

While smoking, the mouthpiece is usually compressed to create two separate perpendicular flat surfaces, with one of them going into the mouth.

Papirosy was a unique Russian form of cigarettes invented in the 19th century. By 1914, 49,5% of all tobacco products produced in Russia was papirosy.

== Notable brands ==
A popular cheap brand in the Soviet Union was Belomorkanal. These are still manufactured in some post-Soviet states.

It is claimed that Joseph Stalin's favorite tobacco to stuff his pipe was from Herzegovina Flor papirosy. It is possible that this is just a legend: the pipe requires a large cut of tobacco, otherwise it burns quickly. Film chronicles show that Stalin smoked cigarettes in a usual way.

Other popular types include Kazbek.

== See also ==
- Papirosn
