= Mouthpiece =

Mouthpiece may refer to:

- The part of an object which comes near or in contact with one's mouth or nose during use
  - Mouthpiece (smoking pipe) or cigarette holder
  - Mouthpiece (telephone handset)
  - Mouthpiece (woodwind), a component of a woodwind instrument
  - Mouthpiece (brass), a component of a brass instrument
  - Mouthpiece (scuba), a component of a scuba diving or industrial breathing set
  - Mouthpiece, a device attached to demand end of swimmer's or diver's breathing tube
  - Mouthguard, a device protecting the teeth from injury, also known as mouth piece

== Other ==
- The Mouthpiece, a 1932 crime drama film directed by James Flood and Elliott Nugent
- Mouthpiece (play), a 2015 Canadian play by Norah Sadava and Amy Nostbakken
- Mouthpiece (film), a 2018 Canadian drama film inspired by the 2015 play
- Mouthpiece (comics), a DC comics character
- Mouthpiece (band), a hardcore punk band
- Figuratively and with negative connotations to indicate the role of a spokesperson or mass media venue that is used to perpetuate the views or agenda of another, as in "the newspaper became a mouthpiece for its owner's political views"
