= Morava (cigarette) =

Former Serbian cigarette brand

- An old Serbian pack of Morava cigarettes.
- Product type: Cigarette
- Current owner: Philip Morris Operations
- Country: Serbia
- Markets: See Markets

Morava was a Serbian brand of cigarettes which was owned and manufactured by Philip Morris Operations.

== History ==
Morava was founded in the Socialist Republic of Serbia and named after the river Morava, by which most cigarettes were delivered. Tobacco was forbidden at the time but following riots, the law was amended to forbid only the plant. After significant shortages, Morava was assigned a contract with the United Kingdom brand Phillip Morris to import pre-made cigarettes. The company used the same river for transport that it was named after. Morava was one of the brands with the highest sales within the Yugoslavian market. It was one of the few cigarette brands (along with Drina) to survive after the breakup of Yugoslavia. Morava's last variant of cigarettes was discontinued after 2005 due to poor sales.

== Markets ==
Morava was sold in the following countries: Austria, Kingdom of Yugoslavia, Socialist Federal Republic of Yugoslavia, Socialist Republic of Slovenia, Socialist Republic of Bosnia and Herzegovina, Socialist Republic of Serbia and the Republic of Serbia (1992–2006).

== See also ==
- Tobacco smoking
