= Smart (cigarette) =

Austrian cigarette brand

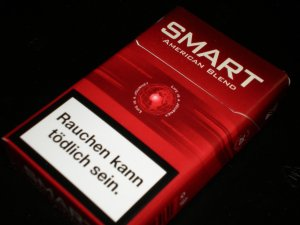
- An old Austrian pack of Smart cigarettes, with an Austrian text warning at the bottom of the pack.
- Product type: Cigarette
- Produced by: Austria Tabak GmbH
- Country: Austria
- Introduced: September 7, 1959; 67 years ago
- Markets: See Markets Austria, Germany

Smart (alternative name: Smart Export) is an Austrian brand of cigarettes, currently owned and manufactured by Austria Tabak GmbH (Austria Tobacco Company).

== History ==
Smart was created on September 7, 1959, as a filter cigarette in Austria. By mid-1962 it became the second most popular cigarette brand in Austria and finally in 1968 it ousted the brand Austria 3 (also known as A3) from square one in terms of popularity. The "export" was itself banned in 1975 from the market.

== Packaging ==
The design of Smart Export was created in 1959 in Austria and is attributed to tobacco plants. The black box with the white and golden strokes, the globe and the maxim "semper et ubique - always and everywhere" designed on behalf of the graphic artist Heimo Lauth. His design is based on that of Emanuela Delignon (née Waha) for the precursor brand "Smart" from 1956 onwards.

== Dissemination ==
Smart still is quite a popular brand on the Austrian Market, because it is relatively inexpensive. A 20-pack of the varieties "Smart Export", "Smart Export White" and "Smart American Blend 100" cost €4.70 (As of April 2017).

== Artist name ==
The avantgardist artist Valie Export chose her stage name very early in terms of the graphically represented Weltbekanntheit of the brand. In 2017, Valie opensedher let out archive in the former Linz Tobacco Factory export center.

Her art piece can be seen at the MoMA museum. She printed the art piece in 2005.

== Markets ==
Smart cigarettes are sold in the following countries: Finland, Germany, Austria, Switzerland, Slovakia, Estonia and Turkey.
