= Sobranie =

Cigarette brand

- A pack of Sobranie Cocktail cigarettes, with a warning message at the bottom
- Product type: Cigarette
- Current owner: Japan Tobacco
- Produced by: Gallaher Group
- Country: United Kingdom
- Introduced: 1879; 147 years ago
- Markets: See § Markets

Sobranie (Note: The title is written in Latin script and derives from the Russian word собраніе in pre-revolutionary orthography, meaning "gathering", "collection", or "assembly".) is a brand of cigarettes, currently owned and manufactured by Gallaher Group, a subsidiary of Japan Tobacco.

== History ==
The Balkan Sobranie tobacco business was established in London in 1879 by Albert Weinberg (born in Romania in 1849), whose naturalization papers dated in 1886 confirm his nationality and show that he had emigrated to England in the 1870s at a time when hand-made cigarettes in the Eastern European and Russian tradition were becoming fashionable in Europe. It is one of the oldest cigarette brands in the world. Albert's young cousin Isaiah Redstone (1884–1963) joined him in the business and registered the "Balkan Sobranie" trademark, later shortened to Sobranie. By 1910, Albert was manufacturing at 34 Glasshouse Street, London. After Albert's death, Isaiah Redstone and his sons Charles Coleman Redstone (1911–1994) and Dr. Isidore Redstone (1925–2022) continued to own and manage the business. In the early 1980s, the Sobranie trademarks were sold to Gallaher Group, which continued production with a modified formula at various locations in Europe. Gallaher was subsequently purchased by Japan Tobacco in 2007.

Throughout its existence, Sobranie was marketed as the definition of luxury in the tobacco industry, being adopted as the official provider of many European royal houses and elites around the world including the Imperial Court of Russia and the royal courts of the United Kingdom of Great Britain and Ireland, Spain, Romania, and Greece.

Premium brands include the multi-coloured Sobranie Cocktail and the black and gold Sobranie Black Russian, which are produced in Ukraine. Sobranie Cocktail, Black Russian and White Russian variants are emblazoned with the Russian imperial double-headed eagle.

== Sponsorships ==
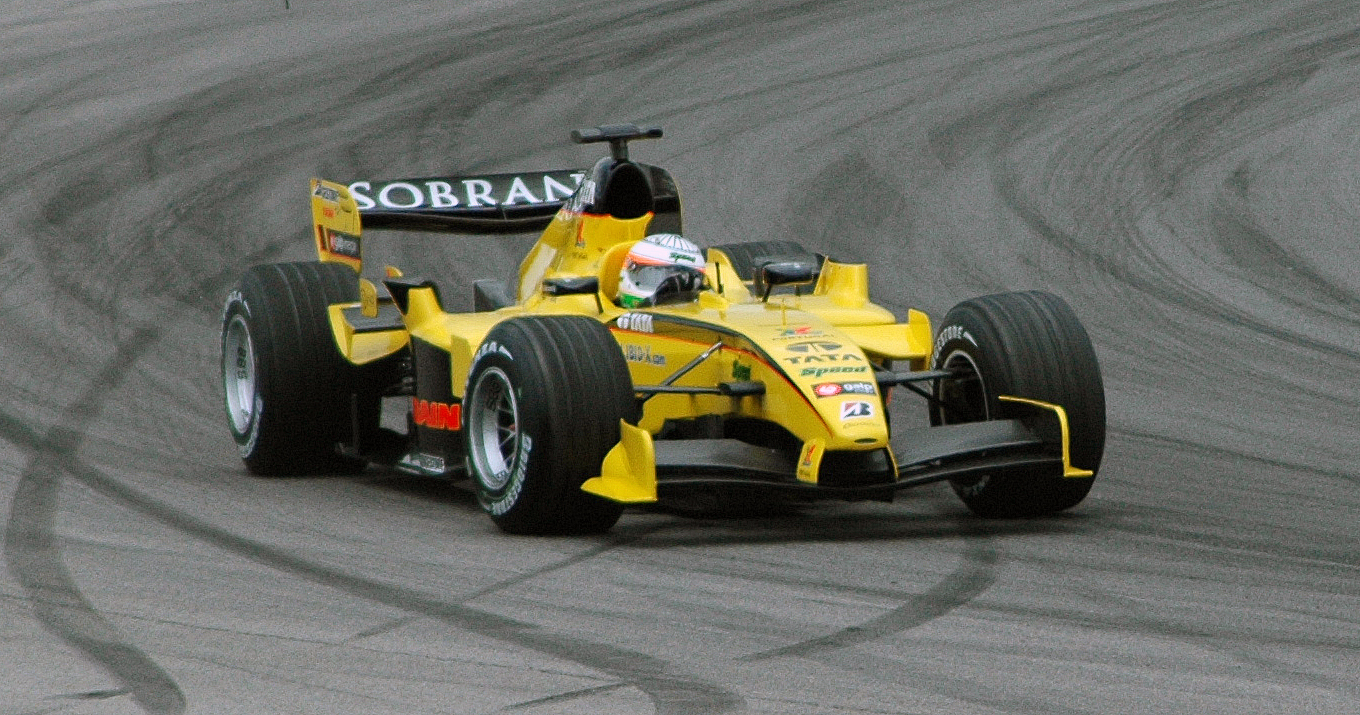
Narain Karthikeyan's Jordan EJ15 with the Sobranie sponsorship on its rear wing in qualifying at the 2005 United States Grand Prix

Sobranie was a sponsor of the Jordan Grand Prix team in 2004 and 2005. The logos were displayed on the front, side and rear wing of the cars. In countries where tobacco sponsorship was forbidden, the logos were removed or replaced. Sobranie was primarily a replacement for Jordan's primary tobacco sponsor, Benson & Hedges (a Gallaher-owned brand in the United Kingdom), in the United States Grand Prix, to circumvent the Tobacco Master Settlement Agreement (MSA), as a clause in the settlement meant Philip Morris USA (who holds the Benson & Hedges trademark in the United States) was only permitted to sponsor Team Penske in American open-wheel racing with their Marlboro brand.

== Markets ==
Sobranie Black Russian cigarettes

Sobranie cigarettes were mainly sold in the United Kingdom until the introduction of plain packaging, but also were or still are sold in Armenia, Austria, Azerbaijan, Belarus, Bosnia and Herzegovina, Bulgaria, China, Croatia, France, Georgia, Greece, India, Japan, Kazakhstan, Kosovo, Malaysia, Montenegro, North Macedonia, Poland, Romania, Moldova, Russia, Serbia, Singapore, Switzerland, Taiwan and Ukraine as well as many duty free shops in airports.

== See also ==
- LD (cigarette)
