= Michael Bambang Hartono =

Indonesian businessman (1939–2026)

- Born: 2 October 1939; Kudus, Semarang Residency, Dutch East Indies
- Died: 19 March 2026 (aged 86); Singapore
- Education: Diponegoro University
- Occupations: Co-owner of Djarum, BCA and Como 1907
- Known for: Owner of BCA; Founder of Polytron
- Children: 4
- Father: Oei Wie Gwan
- Relatives: Robert Budi Hartono (brother)

Chinese name
- Traditional Chinese: 黃輝祥
- Simplified Chinese: 黄辉祥
- Hanyu Pinyin: Huáng Huīxiáng
- Hokkien POJ: Ûiⁿ Hui Siông

Medal record

Mixed Group Contract Bridge

Representing Indonesia

Asian Games
Bronze medal – third place	2018 Jakarta	Supermixed team

Michael Bambang Hartono (2 October 1939 – 19 March 2026) was an Indonesian billionaire heir and businessman.

Along with his brother, Robert Budi, he co-owned the kretek (clove cigarette) manufacturer Djarum, which they inherited from their father Oei Wie Gwan upon his death in 1963. Growing the business to a large conglomerate including Bank Central Asia, electronics, plantations and various properties, they became the richest people in the country with Michael himself having had a net worth of $25.1 billion as of December 2024.

== Early life ==
Michael Hartono was born on 2 October 1939, in the town of Kudus, in Central Java. His father, Oei Wie Gwan, had purchased a small kretek cigarette factory called Djarum Gramophon (lit: Gramophone needle) in April 1951, and renamed it to just Djarum. In 1963, however, the factory burned down and shortly thereafter Oie Wie died, leaving Michael and his younger brother Robert Budi Hartono to inherit the factory.

After completing his high school in Kudus, Hartono studied at the faculty of economics and business at Diponegoro University starting in 1959, but returned to Kudus upon his father's death.

== Career ==
Djarum grew under the two brothers, making its first export in 1972 and introducing new products. Today, the cigarette brand is one of the largest in Indonesia, with a 19 percent market share in 2012. As the cigarette business continued to grow, the group began expanding to other fields, founding an electronics brand, Polytron, in 1975. The group also expanded into businesses like palm oil, papermaking, and communication towers.

Starting their entry into the banking business through Haga Bank and Hagakita Bank, the brothers, under the Mauritius-registered corporation FarIndo Investments in a consortium with Farallon Capital, took over 51.15% of Bank Central Asia in 2002, defeating other bidders despite making a lower offer. While initially only holding less than a 10% stake in the consortium, Djarum held a 92.18% stake in the consortium by 2006, though the Haga and Hagakita Banks were sold to Rabobank. After a Rp 3.45 trillion deal with UBS in 2010, the brothers controlled a majority of the company's shares.

The shares were transferred to an Indonesian holding company PT Dwimuria Investama Andalan in 2016 during a tax amnesty program. As of September 2017, the company was jointly held by Michael and Robert, and possessed a 54.94% stake in BCA.

Aside from the aforementioned businesses, the Djarum group also controls several shopping malls and buildings in Jakarta, including Grand Indonesia, Hotel Indonesia, and BCA Tower.

According to Forbes, Hartono had a net worth of $25.1 billion, as of December 2024, rendering him the 76th richest person in the world at the time. He and his brother – who was also listed slightly ahead of him on the list at 69th – were named as the richest Indonesians in 2017, the 9th year in a row they were listed as such.

The company is also active in internet ventures, controlling e-commerce website Blibli.com and Kaskus, one of Indonesia's largest online communities.

== Personal life ==
Hartono lived in Kudus, Indonesia, and was married to Ikawati Budiarto. The couple had four children.

=== Bridge ===
Bambang was a bridge player. In an interview, he said that "bridge is how you train yourself in making good decisions and risk-taking" and that his uncle introduced him to the game during the Japanese occupation of Indonesia. A major supporter of the sport in the country and president of the South East Asia Bridge Federation, he received an award from the World Bridge Federation in 2017 for his support in making bridge a category in the Asian Games.

He represented Indonesia at the Asian Games 2018 in bridge, winning a bronze medal with his team at the Supermixed team event hence making him the oldest Indonesian Asian Games medal winner. He was the oldest athlete in the Indonesian contingent, though several other non-Indonesian bridge players were older. He had also participated in other competitions abroad, in one case self-admittedly falling asleep during a finals match due to drinking wine beforehand.

Hartono was part of the Indonesian teams which won bronze medals in the 2008 World Bridge Games in Beijing, the 2009 World Team Championships in São Paulo, and the 2010 World Series Championships in Philadelphia.

=== Death ===
Bambang died in Singapore on 19 March 2026, at the age of 86. He had previously suffered from chronic obstructive pulmonary disease and had a heart attack. He was buried on 25 March in Rembang, Central Java, at his family's cemetery.
