= BCA Tower =

- Menara BCA
- BCA Tower in Central Jakarta, near Selamat Datang Monument

General information
- Type: Office
- Location: Jakarta, Indonesia, Kav-1, Jalan M.H. Thamrin, Central Jakarta
- Coordinates: 6°11′48.3″S 106°49′21.1″E
- Current tenants: Bank Central Asia
- Construction started: 2004
- Completed: 2008
- Opened: 2008
- Owner: PT Djarum

Height
- Architectural: 230 m (750 ft)
- Tip: 230 m (750 ft)

Technical details
- Material: Glass; Reinforced Concrete; Steel
- Floor count: 56

Design and construction
- Architect: RTKL
- Developer: PT Grand Indonesia

BCA Tower (Indonesian: Menara BCA) is a skyscraper at Jalan M.H. Thamrin, Central Jakarta, Indonesia. The 230 m (750 ft) tall tower has 56 storeys above ground and is home to Bank Central Asia's head office.FacilitiesThe building is connected to Grand Indonesia Shopping Town, Hotel Indonesia, and Kempinski Residences, Jakarta.A swimming pool and modern fitness outlet are located on the 11th floor.

A restaurant named Skye on the top floor overlooks the city and is a popular place to view the sunset and night skyline of Jakarta.

== See also ==
- List of tallest buildings in Jakarta
- List of tallest buildings in Indonesia
