= Hermina Hospitals =

Indonesian group network of hospitals

Hermina Hospitals Group
- Type: Public
- Traded as: IDX: HEAL
- Industry: Healthcare
- Founded: 7 May 1999; 27 years ago
- Headquarters: Jakarta, Indonesia
- Area served: Indonesia
- Key people: dr. Husen Sutakaria, Sp.OG, President Komisaris dr. Hasmoro, Sp.An., KIC, M.H.A., M.M., President Director
- Brands: HERMINA Hospitals
- Owner: PT. Astra International, Tbk. (7,23%) Grup Djarum (3,63%) Publik (56,57%)
- Parent: PT. Medikaloka Hermina, Tbk.
- Website: www.herminahospitals.com

PT Medikaloka Hermina Tbk is a health service company headquartered in Jakarta, Indonesia. As of December 2024, the hospital network had grown to 52 hospitals operating in 63 cities across 17 provinces in Indonesia.

== History ==
=== 1967-1997 ===
The company began its history in 1967 when Hermina Sulaiman established "Djatinegara Maternity Hospital" on Jl. Jatinegara Barat no. 126, East Jakarta with 7 beds. In 1970, Hermina Sulaiman collaborated with Budiono Wibowo, an obstetrician and gynecologist to develop the maternity hospital into "Hermina Maternity Hospital" with 13 beds. In 1983, the Hermina Foundation was officially formed to apply for a permit to establish "Hermina Maternity Hospital", which finally began operating on April 25, 1985 with 25 beds. The maternity hospital continued to be developed until it finally changed its name to "Hermina Djatinegara Mother and Child Hospital" six years later. In 1995, the Hermina Foundation acquired a hospital located in Sunter Agung, North Jakarta . In 1997, Hermina Foundation opened a new hospital in Bekasi with 150 beds. In 1999, Hermina Foundation changed its status from a non-profit organization to a company under the name "PT Medikaloka Hermina".

=== 2000-2024 ===
Between 2000 and 2002, the company opened three new hospitals in Greater Jakarta. Between 2003 and 2008, the company opened three new hospitals and acquired two hospitals. Between 2009 and 2014, the company opened seven new hospitals and acquired three hospitals. In 2014, the company opened its first hospital outside Java, in Palembang rumah sakit. Between 2015 and 2016, the company opened two new hospitals and acquired one hospital. In 2016, the company opened Hermina Tower in Jakarta to serve as its head office. In 2017, the company opened four new hospitals and completed a restructuring process to consolidate the hospitals it managed. On May 16, 2018, the company was officially listed on the Indonesia Stock Exchange. The company also opened three new hospitals, namely in Samarinda, Jakabaring and Padang, and acquired one hospital in Bandar Lampung. In 2019, the company opened two new hospitals, namely in Pekanbaru and Kendari, and acquired two hospitals, namely in Pekalongan and Wonogiri.

On January 18, 2022, the company inaugurated a new hospital in Cilegon. Hermina Nusantara Hospital is the 50th hospital by the company launched on 11 October 2024 by Indonesian president Joko Widodo at Nusantara.
