= PB Djarum =

Indonesian badminton club

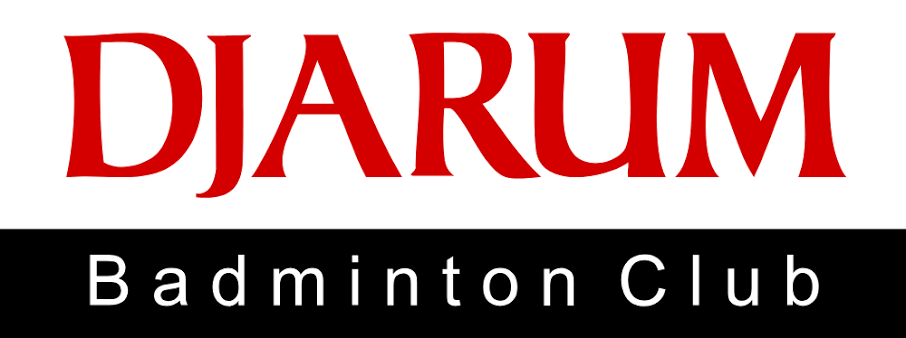
- Full name: Perkumpulan Bulu Tangkis Djarum
- Sport: Badminton
- Founded: 1974
- Region: Nationwide
- Location: Kudus Regency
- Arena: GOR Bulutangkis Djarum, Jati Kudus Jl. Raya Kudus – Purwodadi KM 0,3.
- Owner: Djarum Group through Djarum Foundation
- CEO: Robert Budi Hartono
- Website: pbdjarum.org

PB Djarum is an Indonesian badminton club in Kudus, Central Java. The club was founded at the Djarum brak (cigarette factory) located at Jl. Bitingan Lama (now called Jl. Lukmonohadi) No. 35 in Kudus in 1969. Djarum's CEO, Budi Hartono, encouraged the use of an on-site badminton court among his employees. A young athlete, Liem Swie King, played well, leading Budi Hartono to seriously develop the Kudus community's activities into the PB Djarum organization.

PB Djarum's name gained recognition when Indonesia won the Thomas Cup in 1984 in Kuala Lumpur, Malaysia. At that time, out of eight players, seven came from PB Djarum, namely, Liem Swie King, Hastomo Arbi, Hadiyanto, Hariamanto Kartono, Rudy Heryanto, Christian Hadinata, and Hadibowo. The eighth player was Icuk Sugiarto.

== Sportwashing ==
=== Tobacco Marketing Through Young and Underage Athletes ===
Since 2006, Djarum Foundation has held badminton scholarship auditions for children, initially targeting 15-year-olds and held only in Kudus. By 2015, the auditions expanded to several cities across Indonesia, and by 2017, the age range was extended to children aged 6 to 15. Djarum, a long-established name in badminton since 1974, saw these auditions as an opportunity to market their brand, especially after the government implemented regulations in 2012 limiting tobacco advertising. In 2018, nearly 6,000 children participated in the auditions, yet only 23 received scholarships.

The significant disparity between the number of participants and scholarship recipients suggests that these auditions served more as a marketing tool than as a genuine effort to find future badminton talents. Children who did not receive scholarships often returned for subsequent auditions, unaware that they were being used to promote a tobacco company. Djarum strategically used the sport's positive image to diminish the negative stigma surrounding their tobacco products.

Audition participants were required to wear t-shirts with the Djarum logo, identical to the brand's tobacco products, and the entire event was branded with the company's imagery. Children, especially those under 13, typically did not know that Djarum was associated with cigarettes, though many learned this after participating. The use of children as promotional tools for tobacco products clearly violates laws such as the Indonesia's Child Protection Act, which prohibits economic exploitation of children.

These auditions were more than just a sports event. Djarum used children as vehicles for brand promotion, disregarding the negative effects on their health and development. Such actions are considered economic exploitation, in violation of laws protecting children from exploitation.

In September 2019, news broke that a youth badminton tournament held yearly by the Djarum Foundation, the humanitarian division of one of Indonesia's largest cigarette companies, would be cancelled after this year due to backlash from the Indonesian Commission for Child Protection (KPAI) and Yayasan Lentera Anak (YLA), a children's non-governmental organisation. Unsurprisingly, the cancellation of a much-awaited, high-profile event sparked outrage online.

== History ==
- 1969 – PT Djarum's employees regularly practiced badminton at brak Bitingan Lama.
- 1970 – Brak turned out to be a popular exercise spot for Djarum's employees.
- 1972 – PT Djarum began to play tournaments and won Piala Munadi; Liem Swie King was awarded Junior Boys' Singles Winner, the first national accomplishment.
- 1974 – PB Djarum Kudus was established with Setyo Margono as its leader.
- 1976 – PB Djarum Semarang was founded. In the same year, Liem Swie King reached All England Final. He lost to Rudy Hartono.
- 1978 – Liem Swie King became the first PB Djarum player to achieve the All England Men's Singles and was noted as the third Men's Singles Winner from Indonesia.
- 1979 – Liem Swie King won the All England again.
- 1981 – Liem Swie King conquered the All England for the third time. At the Men's Doubles, Kartono and Heryanto won.
- 1982 – Integrated badminton facility opened at Kaliputu – Kudus.
- 1984 – Kartono and Heryanto hold the same position in All England Men's Doubles. Also, Indonesia won the Thomas Cup with seven out of eight team members from PB Djarum.
- 1985 – PB Djarum Jakarta was set up.
- 1986 – PB Djarum Surabaya was established.
- 1989 – Supported by Christian Hadinata, one of the Indonesian badminton legacies, the badminton facility opened at Kaliputu, Kudus in 1982 was chosen to facilitate the Doubles Players (Men, Women, and Mixed). Ardy B. Wiranata from PB Djarum was the Runner-up for the World Tournament in the Men's Singles.
- 1990 – PB Djarum Kudus and PB Djarum Jakarta were united as PB Djarum.
- 1991 – Ardy B. Wiranata became the fourth champion from Indonesia, winning the All England Men's Singles.
- 1992 – Alan Budikusuma attained gold medal in the Olympiad. At the same time, Eddy Hartono and Gunawan became the All England Men's Doubles Winner.
- 1993 – Hariyanto Arbi in All England and Alan Budikusuma in World Tournament were awarded Men's Singles Winner.
- 1994 – Haryanto Arbi was again awarded Men's Singles Winner, while Gunawan and Bambang Suprianto prevailed in All England Men's Doubles.
- 1995 – Haryanto Arbi was triumphant in the World Tournament.
- 1996 – Antonius and Denny Kantono achieved the bronze medal from Atlanta Olympiad Men's Doubles.
- 1997 – Sigit Budiarto and Candra Wijaya became World Champions.
- 2000 – Olympiad Mixed Doubles silver medal was brought home by Trikus Haryanto and Minarti Timur.
- 2003 – Sigit Budiarto and Candra Wijaya won the All England.
- 2004 – Athena Olympiad bronze medal was presented by Eng Hian and Flandy Limpele. Within the year, PB Djarum started to build an international-level badminton court (Gelanggang Olah Raga–GOR) at Jl. Jati – Kudus, above the 43,207 square meter land.
- 2006 – The GOR Jati opened.
- 2008 – Maria Kristin Yulianti won a bronze medal for Indonesia in the Beijing Olympiad. She lost to Zhang Ning in the semi-final, but won a thrilling bronze medal match with Lu Lan.

== Stadium profile (GOR Jati) ==
The first PB Djarum GOR (Gelanggang Olah Raga, international-level badminton court) was located at Bitingan Lama (1969). In 1982, it was replaced by Kaliputu and known as the second GOR. Both were used by PB Djarum Kudus and now are used by local residents to practice badminton, as GOR Jati was built above the 43,207 meters squares land at Jl. Jati – Kudus in 2004 and authorized on 27 May 2006.

In accordance with PB Djarum's mission, GOR Jati construction cost about IDR 30 billion, which is applied to PB Djarum's athletes in Men's and Women's Singles competitions. The Doubles are placed at PB Djarum Jakarta. According to the international standard, GOR Jati is claimed to be the best training facility in Asia. Among 29,450 square meter, the GOR Jati facility comprises 4,925 square meter sports building with 16 courts inside. Twelve of them are surfaced with wood; the others with vinyl (synthetic rubber). There is seating on the right and left sides. Other supplementary buildings are: meeting room, office space, cafeteria, fitness center, computers room, audio-visual room, and library. Included within the facility is a 1,834 square meter athletes' residence hall. It has 40 bedrooms for two persons each, complete with beds and desks, separated between Men/Boys and Women/Girls. The coaches' house takes 312 square meters from the total facility area.

== Education profile ==
PB Djarum emphasizes the integration of academic education with athletic training for its members. Because many athletes are enrolled in primary and secondary schools, the organization collaborates with the Department of Education and Culture to help students balance their academic responsibilities with competitive tournament schedules.

The Department supports PB Djarum's athletes by presenting school time dispensation, beginning studies at different times from regular students. They are also given permission to leave classes to attend tournaments. At present, some schools that sustain PB Djarum's athletes' academy are SD Barongan II, SMP Taman Dewata, and SMA Kramat.

== Training profile ==
"Athletes must work hard. Without effort, no triumph will come easily" – Budi Hartono, CEO of PT Djarum.

This is true, especially for PB Djarum's athletes. In PB Djarum, every athlete candidate must pass the selection phase, including considerations like age, height, aptitude, intellectual capacity, psychological stability, basic skills, and family support. They must pass to join PB Djarum training activities.

After the initial selection, there is a continuous selection in athletes' match ability. They must improve; otherwise, he/she will be sent home, as a part of a promotion-degradation training system applied by PB Djarum. The clauses that define the system are written to acknowledge each athlete's parents from the beginning.

The system increases the competitive atmosphere between athletes, and under-performing athletes are given chances for self-improvement, or to develop another career.
