= Abdullah Gymnastiar =

Indonesian Islamic cleric and preacher

K.H. Abdullah Gymnastiar
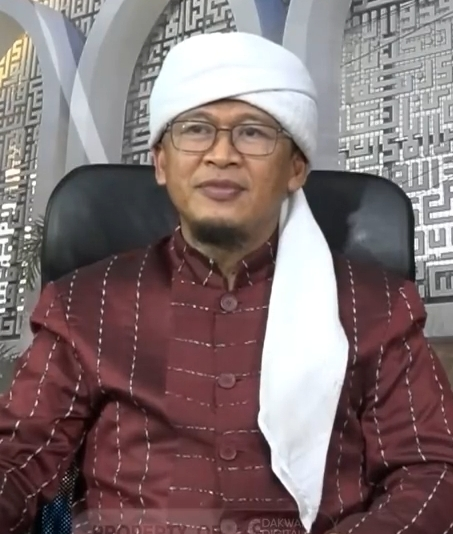
- Born: Yan Gymnastiar; January 29, 1962 (age 64); Bandung, West Java, Indonesia
- Other name: Aa Gym
- Education: D-3 PAAP Padjadjaran University; PTKSI Bandung Institute of Technology; General Achmad Yani University; Miftahul Huda Manjonjaya Islamic school
- Occupations: Islamic cleric, preacher, singer, author, entrepreneur, founder of the Da'arut Tauhiid Islamic boarding school and AA GYM (Fitness Center)
- Organizations: Family of Muslim Student Entrepreneurs (KMIW, 1987); Pondok Pesantren Da'arut Tauhiid (1990); Pondok Pesantren Da'arut Tauhiid Foundation (1993)
- Spouses: Hj. Ninih Muthma'innah (div. 2021); Elfarini Eridani
- Children: between Ninih: Ghaida Tsurayya; Muhammad Ghazi Al Ghifari; Ghina Roudlotul Jannah; Ghaitsa Zahira Shofa; Ghefira Nur Fathimah; Muhammad Ghaza Al Ghazali; Gheriyya Rahimah between Eridani: Muhammad Ghaisan Driyya Addien
- Parent(s): H. Engkus Kuswara; Hajjah Yeti Rohayati

Yan Gymnastiar (born January 29, 1962), better known as Abdullah Gymnastiar or Aa Gym (lit: elder brother Gym), is an Indonesian Islamic cleric, preacher, singer, author, entrepreneur and founder of the Da'arut Tauhiid Islamic boarding school in Bandung. Gymnastiar became popular by introducing a unique way of preaching by theatrical style with practical messages of Islamic propagation that can be commonly applied to everyday life.

His sermons revolve around self-control, conscience, tolerance, and persistence of faith. Gymnastiar is considered favored by its audience due to his construction of image as a religious figure different from other scholars. While conventional scholars preach about the virtues of prayers, fasting, and the splendor of heaven, Gymnastiar chooses to tell about the importance of sincerity, peace, and serenity (sakina) of family, using everyday language that is accessible and affectionate. At the peak, he had a substantial number of followings, and his media enterprise had regular audience of more than 80 million people.

The topic of discussion about the family is concentrated on the housewives, to the point that he is referred as "ustad of the happy family". This image became controversial when the media announced Gymnastiar's polygamous marriage with Alfarini Eridani, also known as Teh Rini in December 2006, when he had been married to his first wife Hajjah Ninih Muthmainnah, also known as Teh Ninih, since the year 1988 and had seven children. Many fans were disappointed, stopped visiting Da'arut Tauhiid, and went down the street protesting against his polygamy. The controversy had a major impact on his popularity and business. He has been gradually regaining his popularity since then.

== Early life ==
Gymnastiar was born as one of four children, and he had worked from the ground up such as selling newspapers and driving public transportation to self-finance while attending the after schooling in electrical engineering before turning into an entrepreneur. His ability to appear in public was also honed as a debater at his university.

During the 80s, under the guidance of Jujun Junaedi in Garut, West Java, he deepened the spiritual understanding of laduni (science without learning process). In 1982, he became the Commander of the Student Regiment at the General Achmad Yani Academy of Engineering. In 1987, he and his friends joined the Family of Muslim Student Entrepreneurs (KMIW), an institution pioneered in the entrepreneurial business in small business fields such as sticker making, shirts, key chains, and stationery with religious slogans.

== Career ==
In 1990, he founded Da'arut Tauhiid (DT) Islamic school through KMIW at Gymnastiar's parents' house which then moved to Gegerkalong Girang street, equipped with a 20-unit cabin and financed directly by its owner at Rp 100 million. The establishment of DT was inspired by the success of the Al-Arqam movement in Malaysia which became influential by meeting the needs of daily lives in an Islamic way. The difference between Al-Arqam and DT is the lesser exclusivity of DT and its availability to the public. In 1993, Pondok Pesantren Da'arut Tauhiid Foundation was built with a three-story building, which is used for the business activity. In 1994, Gymnastiar established Cooperative Pondok Pesantren (Kopontren) DT to prop up his dawah. In 1995, about 50 meters from the mosque, a pilgrim bought a plot of land along with its building which was then used as the foundation's office, the residence of the cottage leader, kindergartens, meeting room, convention center, warehouse, and the dormitory for santris (student of pesantren). At the end of 1997, the four-story Kopontren Building across the mosque was built and used for Baitul Mal wat-Tamwil (BMT) offices for staff training and printing, supermarkets and mini markets, telecommunication stalls, and others.

In 2000, after the incorporation of radio broadcasting among DT in 1999, Gymnastiar began performing preaching on National TV. He became one of the permanent performers in the program Hikmah Fajar on RCTI. In 2001, Gymnastiar owned an independent program under a series of programs entitled Manajemen Qolbu (lit: Heart Management). In 2004, Gymnastiar presented a political theme titled Ada Aa Gym on RCTI in relations with the 2004 presidential election. During this time, Gymnastiar had 15 publishing businesses that have published 32 titles of books and dozens of tapes and CDs as a medium for dawah. He was also recorded receiving 1,200 invitations to be a speaker every month. Other businesses that he owned are radio broadcasting, mini-television studios, and other media businesses including offices of websites, supermarket co-operatives, mosques and boarding schools with a capacity of 500 students, two orphanages, a stopover house for visiting pockets and the holding of seminars, management training seminars.

In 2006, during the anti-pornography protests in Indonesia over publication of the inaugural Indonesian edition of Playboy magazine, he called for an anti-pornography legislation and embarked on a mission to shroud the state with a sense of shame saying, “the more shameful, the more faithful.” Eventually in December 2008, Indonesian lawmakers signed an anti-pornography bill into law.

At the peak, he had a substantial number of followers, with several political parties nominating him as vice-president nominee and this scored approval rating of 91%. His media enterprise had regular audience of more than 80 million people. Ulil Abshar Abdalla of the Liberal Islam Network once called him a "Britney Spears in Islam". Time magazine once questioned whether he was merely a businessman who used religion as a means of profit. However, Solahuddin Wahid of Nahdlatul Ulama argued that Gymnastiar's strength lies in its sincerity. In 2017, he was listed on the 500 Most Influential Muslims list.

== Controversy ==
=== Polygamy ===
In December 2006, Gymnastiar held a press conference announcing his polygamous marriage to a widow with three children who was a former model, Alfarini Eridani as his second wife. He stated that this polygamy was done as an emergency exit, yet it was mocked and faced the extensive protest by the public and his fans, among them quoting Gymnastiar's past statement of not advocating for polygamy. In the same month, the study program by Gymnastiar began to be deserted by visitors, and the two-story mosque was only partially filled. In May 2007, due to decreasing visitors at Pondok Pesantren Da'arut Tauhiid, the pesantren began to reduce its employees. Visits shrunk to 70 percent which affected operational costs, thus as many as 300 employees with casual employment and a total of about 40 percent of employees were laid off.

In December 2010, Gymnastiar's first wife sued for divorce in the religious court. The divorce request was then officially granted in June 2011. In March 2012, the media reported that Gymnastiar reconciled with a reception at the home of his former first wife in the Sariwangi area of Bandung. In this event, Muhsin, the parents of Teh Nini who became his guardian after asking for permission from the religious court, also submitted the mandatory payment (mahr) of Rp. 5 million.
