= Kempinski Residences, Jakarta =

Kempiniski Residences
- Interactive map of the Kempiniski Residences area

General information
- Type: Residential
- Location: Jakarta, Indonesia, Kav-1, Jalan M.H. Thamrin, Central Jakarta
- Coordinates: 6.1947831°S 106.8214108°E
- Construction started: 2004
- Completed: 2008
- Opened: 2008
- Owner: PT. Djarum

Height
- Architectural: 215 m (705 ft)
- Tip: 215 m (705 ft)

Technical details
- Material: Glass; Limestone; Reinforced Concrete; Steel
- Floor count: 57

Design and construction
- Architect: RTKL
- Developer: PT Grand Indonesia
- Main contractor: Ssangyong Engineering & Construction.

Kempinski Residences, Jakarta is a residential skyscraper at Jalan M.H. Thamrin, Central Jakarta, Indonesia. The tower has 57 level above the floor and 215 meters tall. The building is a residential facility, managed by Kempinski. The building is connected to Grand Indonesia Shopping Town and Hotel Indonesia.

== See also ==
- Skyscraper design and construction
- List of tallest buildings in Indonesia
- List of tallest buildings in Jakarta
