= Polytron (electronics company) =

Electronics company from Indonesia

PT Hartono Istana Teknologi
- Logo since 1 March 2021
- Trade name: Polytron
- Formerly: Indonesian Electronic & Engineering (1975-1976); Hartono Istana Electronic (1975-1980)
- Type: Subsidiary
- Industry: Electronics; Electric vehicles
- Founded: 18 September 1975; 51 years ago (as Indonesian Electronic & Engineering)
- Founder: Robert Budi Hartono; Michael Bambang Hartono
- Headquarters: Kudus Regency, Central Java, Indonesia
- Key people: Hariono (CEO)
- Products: Speaker, television, decoder, refrigerator, washing machine, air conditioner, computer monitor, electric motorcycles and scooters, electric cars, personal computers
- Owner: Djarum Group
- Website: www.polytron.co.id

PT Hartono Istana Teknologi, doing business as Polytron, is an Indonesian budget electronics company. The company was founded on 18 September 1975 in Kudus, Central Java under the name Indonesian Electronic & Engineering Limited, then on September 18, 1976, changed its name to Hartono Istana Electronic Limited, then in 2000 merged and became Hartono Istana Teknologi Limited which is a subsidiary of Djarum Group.

== History ==
Polytron logo until 2021

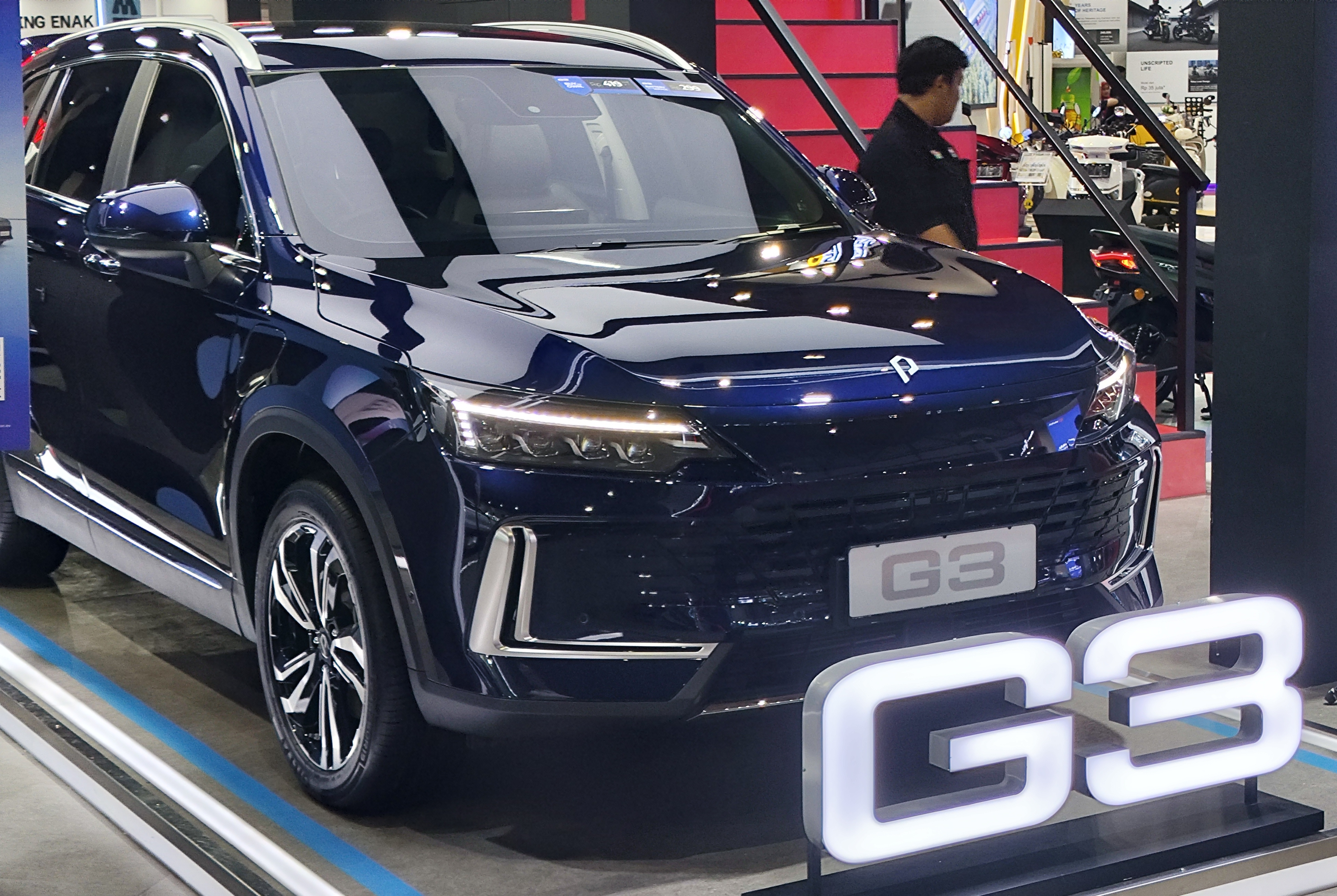
Polytron G3 electric car

Founded on September 18, 1975, Polytron was the first non-cigarette company owned by the Hartono brothers (Robert Budi and Michael Bambang), with an established capital of around IDR 50 billion. The word Polytron itself comes from two words, poly (many) and (elek)tron(ics). The first product released by this company was a television (black and white) in 1975, which is still its main product to this day.

Since the 2000s, Polytron has expanded its products from initially only televisions and audio to producing various kinds of electronic equipment. The goods produced by Polytron are speakers, refrigerators (since late 2000), washing machines (since 2010), air conditioners (since early 2000), smartphones (since 2011) and many more.

Polytron has two factories in Kudus and Demak with more than 10,000 employees. They have 11 representative offices, 5 authorized dealers and 50 service centers throughout all of Indonesia. The company also has a Research and Development division, which works on product development. This division has a total of 500 experts that work in various technological fields. This division focuses on responding to technological developments in the Indonesian market.

Polytron officially entered the electric vehicle industry by launching two of its newest electric motorbike models, Polytron EV Fox and Polytron EV T-Rex, at the 2023 Indonesia International Motor Show.

In May 2025, Polytron launched the G3 and G3+ electric SUVs, which are rebadged Chinese-made Skyworth EV6.

In August 2025, Polytron launched their Luxia laptop line, with three types targeting three different audiences: student, artist, and office.

== Subsidiary company ==
- PT Fira Makmur Sejahtera (Fira)
- PT Global Media Visual (Mola)
  - PT Cahaya Televisi Indonesia (MOS Network/CTV)
- SENT Entertainment Ltd
- PT Perada Swara Production (Megapro Communications)

== Slogan ==
- Pertama dan Satu-satunya (English:The First And Only, 1975–1984 dan 2016–2021)
- The Winning Theme (1984–1995)
- It's A Kind Of Magic (1995–1997)
- Brings Magic Things To Life (1997–2002)
- The Sign Of Quality (2002–2007)
- Memang Canggih (2011–2016)
- Kini Hadir Untuk Semua (English:Now Available for All, 2021-now)
