= Bakmi GM =

Indonesian noodle restaurant chain

- Type: Private company
- Industry: Restaurant
- Founded: 1959; 67 years ago
- Headquarters: Jakarta, Indonesia
- Number of locations: 50+
- Products: Bakmi, Mie ayam
- Parent: Djarum
- Website: bakmigm.com

PT Griya Miesejati, doing business as Bakmi GM, is an Indonesian restaurant chain specializing in bakmi noodle dishes. It was established as a single store at Gajah Mada Street in 1959, and has since then expanded to over 50 locations mostly in Greater Jakarta. Since 2024, it has been majority-owned by the Djarum group.

== History ==
The company started as a noodle stall located at Gajah Mada Street in Jakarta, established by couple Tjhai Sioe and Loei Kwai Fong in 1959 with five tables. The restaurant was previously known as Bakmi Gajah Mada, and it opened its second location at Melawai in 1971. The original location at Gajah Mada has been visited by multiple Indonesian presidents from Sukarno to Joko Widodo, with B. J. Habibie and Megawati Soekarnoputri being regular customers. In particular, Habibie was known to visit the restaurant at lunchtime during the 1970s, before he was appointed a government minister.

In December 2024, Djarum acquired 85 percent of the company for a reported figure of "between Rp 2 and 2.4 trillion" (approximately US$120-150 million). According to Djarum executive Victor Hartono, Bakmi GM's controlling family sought an exit from the business due to their age and lack of successors.

== Products ==
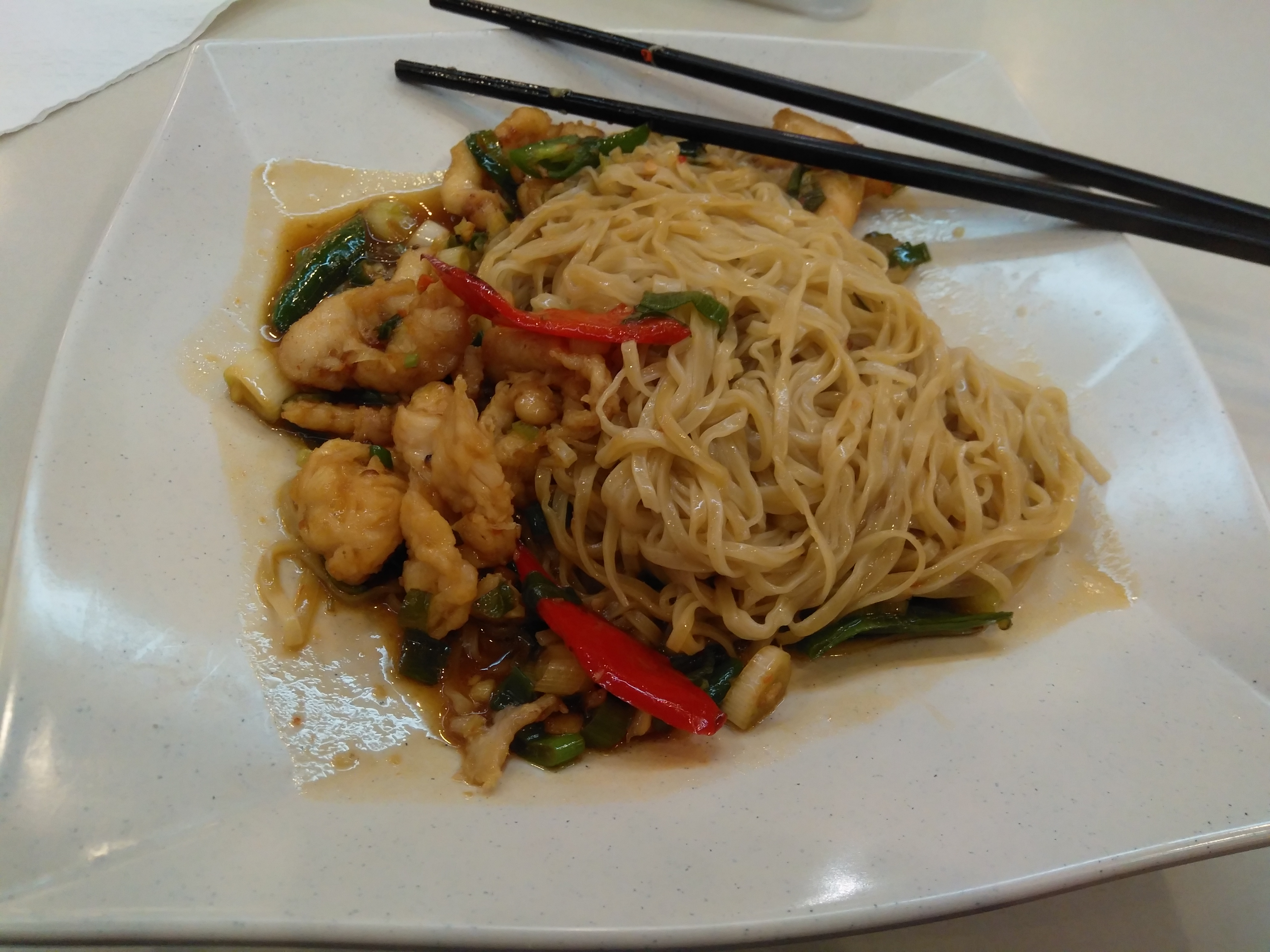
Noodle dish, 2019

Aside from the namesake bakmi (Indonesian noodle) dishes including mie ayam, the restaurants serve several rice-based and chicken dishes, in addition to popular milk tea drinks. Its most popular and flagship product remains "Bakmi Spesial GM", a noodle dish served with chicken broth, topped with soy sauce chicken, choy sum and mushrooms and priced at around Rp 32,000 (USD 2.2) in 2019. CNN Travel describes the noodles as "iconic", and says the dish "garners a cult following".

== Locations ==
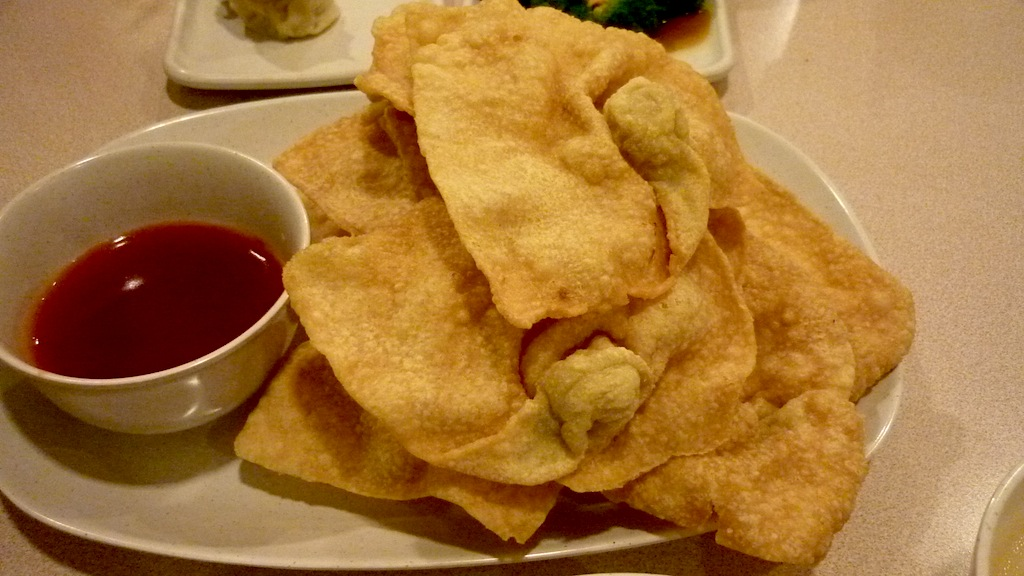
Pangsit goreng (2012 photo)

The chain has over 50 locations with 1,200 employees as of 2022. It also operates food trucks and takeout stalls. Most of the chain's locations are located in Greater Jakarta and West Java, with several branches in Surabaya (opened in 2017) and Denpasar (opened in 2018). In 2019, the company announced its intent to open locations in Sumatra. It serves an estimated 30,000 customers daily as of September 2022.
