= Oei Wie Gwan =

Chinese-Indonesian businessman

Oei Wie Gwan (simplified Chinese: 黄维源; traditional Chinese: 黃維源; pinyin: Huáng Wéiyuán; Pe̍h-ōe-jī: Ûinn Ûi-guân) was a Chinese Indonesian businessman, originally from the Lasem Regency of Central Java Provincial Region of Indonesia who founded the Djarum company.

== Career ==
=== First business venture ===
His first business venture was the establishment of a fireworks factory in the 1930s under the brand Leo, located in Rembang, Central Java. Leo became a leading fireworks brand in Indonesia.

Sometime in 1938, his factory exploded, killing and injuring some of its workers. Nonetheless, his factory was rebuilt and continued producing fireworks.

It continued producing fireworks throughout the Second World War until it shut down business after Indonesia's proclamation of Independence.

=== Djarum ===
In 1951, Oei Wie Gwan purchased a small business named Djarum Gramophon, which literally translates to "gramophone needle". The company was established on 21 April 1951 on Bitingan Kudus Street with 10 employees. The small-time venture soon took off.

Kretek became Oei Wie Gwan's business of choice following the closure of his fireworks business. Under the PT Djarum brand, tobacco and cloves were blended in cigarettes.

== Biography ==
He was born in Lasem Regency, Central Java, Dutch East Indies. His date of birth and mother is unknown, his father's name is Oei Tjiep Djien. He was married to Goei Tjoe Nio.

He died in 1963. He left his sons Michael Bambang Hartono and Robert Budi Hartono in charge of the company.
