= Djarum Black =

Indonesian kretek cigarette and cigar brand

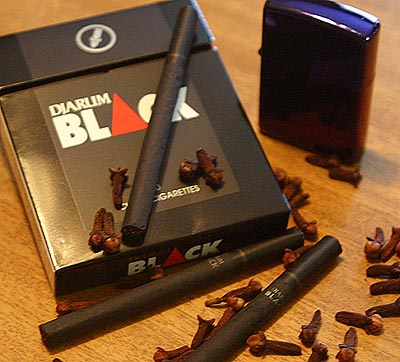
- A pack of Djarum Black Kretek (pink) cigarettes
- Product type: Cigarette, cigar
- Current owner: Djarum
- Country: Indonesia
- Introduced: 2001
- Markets: See Markets
- Website: www.djarum.com

Djarum Black (stylised as DJARUM BL∆CK) is an Indonesian brand of kretek (clove cigarettes and cigars), currently owned and manufactured by Djarum.

== History ==
It is sold in a stretched pack, two cigarettes wide and ten cigarettes long. The cigarette itself is black, flavored paper. The cigarette features a clove flavor both in scent and taste, and the paper has a sweet taste. It is made with natural Indonesian tobacco, and is widely distributed throughout the world.

== Legal status in the United States ==
A federal law passed in the United States in 2009 made it illegal for tobacco shops and stores to carry cigarettes that contain flavors other than menthol. The law affects the Djarum Black cigarette brand and has made it unavailable for purchase within the United States.

Now to sell any type of kretek in the US it must be classified as a cigar, i.e. wrapped in tobacco leaf rather than paper. The current Djarum Black cloves are now rolled in tobacco paper. As of 2010, in the United States Djarum Blacks are available again in smaller 12-pack cigars, which are much thicker than the cigarettes that come in 20 packs.

== Markets ==
Alongside their home market of Indonesia, Djarum Black cigarettes were or still are sold in the following countries Brazil, United Kingdom, Austria, Poland, India and Canada.
