= Robert Budi Hartono =

Indonesian businessman (born 1941)

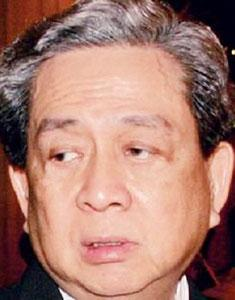
- Hartono in March 2013
- Born: 28 April 1941 (age 85); Semarang, Central Java, Dutch East Indies
- Other name: Oei Hwie Tjhong
- Citizenship: Indonesian
- Education: Diponegoro University
- Known for: Owner of Djarum, BCA and Como 1907; Founder of Polytron
- Spouse: Giok Hartono
- Children: 3
- Parent(s): Oei Wie Gwan & Goei Tjoe Nio
- Relatives: Michael Bambang Hartono (brother)

Chinese name
- Traditional Chinese: 黃輝聰
- Simplified Chinese: 黄辉聪
- Hanyu Pinyin: Huáng Huìzhōng
- Hokkien POJ: Ûiⁿ Huī Tiong

Robert Budi Hartono (born 28 April 1941) is an Indonesian tobacco billionaire with a net worth of US$25.3 billion as of September 2023. He owns and runs the privately held Djarum, the world's third-largest maker of clove cigarettes. Djarum has reportedly recently grabbed shares from the number two cigarette firm, Sampoerna. Budi Hartono also had a stake with his brother, Michael Bambang Hartono in one of Indonesia's biggest banks, Bank Central Asia, formerly controlled by billionaire Sudono Salim. According to Forbes, he is the second richest Indonesian and the 61st richest person in the world.

== Career ==
Starting from scratch, Mr. Oei Wie Gwan bought a small business in the field named Djarum Clove Gramophone. In 1951, he changed its name to Djarum. Oei began marketing cigarettes under the brand name Djarum, which turned out to be successful in the market. After a fire nearly gutted the company in 1963 (Oei died shortly afterward), Djarum started back up and modernized their factory equipment. In 1972 Djarum began to export their product abroad. Three years later the brand Djarum Filter was introduced, the first brand to be produced by machines, followed by the brand Djarum Super, introduced in 1981.

Together with his brother, Michael, at the age of 22 Robert inherited one of the leading cigarette companies today, Djarum. Djarum was previously a small business called Djarum Gramophone which was later purchased by his father, Oei Wie Gwan, in 1951 and changed its name to Djarum. Robert and his brother inherited Djarum after his father died. At that time, Djarum's factory burned down and suffered an uncertain status. In the hands of the two Hartono brothers, Djarum grew into an industry giant.

In September 2019, Budi Hartono and his brother Michael Hartono were reported by Forbes magazine as the richest men in Indonesia in 2019, with a combined wealth of $35 billion. Budi Hartono was listed by Forbes as being worth $18.6 billion, while in 2012 he was worth $6.5 billion.

== Personal life ==
=== Early life ===
Robert Budi Hartono was born in 1941 (as Oei Hwie Tjhong) in the city of Semarang, Central Java, Dutch East Indies. and was the 2nd child of Oei Wie Gwan and Goei Tjo Nio. His brother, Michael Bambang Hartono was born in 1939.

=== Present life ===
He is married with three children and lives in Kudus, Indonesia.
