= Irma Hardisurya =

Indonesian beauty queen (born 1947)

- Beauty pageant titleholder
- Title: Miss Indonesia 1969
- Hair color: Black
- Eye color: Black
- Major competitions: Miss International 1969; Miss Asia Quest 1970 (Miss Friendship)

Irma Priscilla Hardisurya (born July 6, 1947) is an Indonesian consultant, writer, journalist and beauty queen. She was crowned as the first-ever Miss Indonesia in 1969 and represented Indonesia in the 1970 Miss Asia Quest beauty pageant in the Philippines, winning the title of Miss Friendship. Hardisurya also participated in the Miss International 1969 contest. Hardisurya is the only Indonesian woman to represent Indonesia in two international beauty pageants, Miss International and Miss Asia Quest.

Hardisurya is a fashion journalist, and the founder of the Fashion Designer Competition.

== Career ==
=== 1969-1972: Beauty pageant years ===
On August 15, 1969, Irma Hardisurya was crowned the first-ever Miss Indonesia. The pageant was hosted in the Ramayana Room, in Hotel Indonesia. She then participated as Miss Indonesia in the Miss International beauty pageant in Tokyo, Japan, where she was crowned by Indonesian first lady, Tien Soeharto.

Among her prizes, she received a round-trip Pelni ticket to sail Jakarta-Singapore, as well as a flight to Australia (sponsored by the General Motors which had a branch in Australia). She also won a Lambretta motorbike and a stay in the presidential suite at Hotel Indonesia.

In 1970, Hardisurya was crowned Miss Friendship Asia in the Miss Asia Quest 1970 pageant in Quezon City, Philippines. In 1972, she was invited to Hollywood to participate in the Hollywood Parade, where she received the Miss Tourism Hollywood International award.

=== 1972-1980: Career beginnings in the fashion world ===
Hardisurya began her career as a fashion writer in 1972, when she was asked to become Femina magazine's pioneering fashion editor during the magazine's debut. Since then, she has predominantly covered fashion trends and international fashion shows. In addition to copywriting, she also produced sketches of the latest fashion trends for her articles. Hardisurya's first article in Femina Magazine was titled "Keluyuran di Pusat Mode New York", which covered New York as a fashion capital as well as a trend forecast for 1973.

In 1977, Hardisurya began covering pret-a-porter Paris as an official fashion journalist, along with Femina magazine founders Pia Alisjahbana and Mirta Kartohadiprodjo.

In 1979, while working at Femina magazine, Hardisurya pioneered a breakthrough for the Indonesian fashion industry by regularly organizing the Fashion Designer Competition, inspired by the Hong Kong RTW Festival, which later evolved into Hong Kong Fashion Week.

She remained as a journalist with Femina magazine until 1990.
