= Sariwangi =

Indonesian tea brand

- Product type: Tea
- Current owner: Savoria (2026-present)
- Country: Indonesia
- Introduced: 1973; 53 years ago
- Markets: Indonesia
- Previous owners: Unilever (1989-2026)
- Tagline: Teh Berkualitas Pilihan Indonesia (Indonesia's Choice of Quality Tea)
- Website: Official website

Sariwangi (stylized as SariWangi) is an Indonesian tea brand currently owned by Savoria. The brand name literally means 'fragrant essence' in Indonesian. Sariwangi was the first Indonesian tea brand to be packaged in bags, as opposed to the more traditional loose serving. This practical way of serving tea caught on with Indonesian consumers, and with Unilever's acquisition of the brand in 1989 (starting 2026 acquired by Djarum under the food and beverage division Savoria Kreasi Rasa), Sariwangi remained as the largest tea brand in Indonesia.

== History ==
Johan Alexander Supit from Tondano, Indonesia, founded PT Sariwangi in 1964. He used his previous experiences working in other tea companies such as Peek, Frean & Co. Ltd and Joseph Tetley & Company to build his own tea exporting company. It is from these companies that Supit gained the technology for packaging tea in bags, which was uncommon then in Indonesia. In 1972, this novel packaging immediately became a success, and for nearly two decades, Sariwangi dominated the Indonesian tea market.

=== Unilever acquisition ===
In 1989, Unilever acquired the Sariwangi brand, although Supit remained as its major tea supplier through another company, PT Sariwangi Agricultural Estate Agency. Since 2015, however, PT Sariwangi AEA encountered financial problems and in late October 2018, it was declared bankrupt by the Central Jakarta Commercial Court. The Sariwangi brand was produced and sold by PT Unilever Indonesia.

=== Djarum acquisition ===
The Djarum Group, through its subsidiary, PT Savoria Kreasi Rasa, has agreed to purchase the Sariwangi tea business unit from PT Unilever Indonesia Tbk (UNVR).

The purchase of the Sariwangi tea business is valued at IDR 1.5 trillion, agreed by both parties through the signing of a Business Transfer Agreement (BTA). The transaction was completed on 2 March 2026 after all closing documents were executed and full payment was received.

An independent valuation of the Sariwangi tea business unit was conducted by the Public Appraisal Services Office of Suwendho Rinaldy & Associates, which determined the market value at approximately IDR 1.48 trillion.
