= Grand Indonesia Shopping Town =

Grand Indonesia

- Grand Indonesia Shopping Town taken from Tosari Bus Stop
- Location: DKI Jakarta, Indonesia
- Coordinates: 6°11′44.26″S 106°49′18.75″E
- Address: Jalan M.H. Thamrin, No. 1
- Opened: September 2006 (soft opening)
- Manager: PT. Grand Indonesia
- Owner: PT. Djarum
- Num. of stores: 214
- Floor area: 130,000 m^{2} (1,400,000 sq ft)
- Floors: 57 (residences), 56 (office tower), 8 (mall), 14 (hotel)
- Parking: 5500 cars
- Public transit: Tosari or Bundaran HI Astra
- Website: grand-indonesia.com

Grand Indonesia (previously called Grand Indonesia Shopping Town until 2013) is an integrated multipurpose complex at Thamrin Road in Central Jakarta, Indonesia, with 140,000 m² and 630,000 m². It is located near the Selamat Datang Monument. It became the 4th largest mall in Indonesia.

== Facilities ==
Grand Indonesia is spread over two main buildings, the West and East Mall, and is linked by a multi-level bridge. The shopping center is spread over eight levels and is divided into three main districts, Specialty Zone, Main Zone and Crossroads of the World.

After an aggressive renovation the cinema complex of the mall, which sprawls over the eighth floor, CGV introduced the new ScreenX studio at the cinema complex. It is the second largest ScreenX theater in the world, which has a huge curved screen as large as a basketball court at 26 x 14 meters and is compatible with 2D and 3D movies.

== Entertainments ==
=== Crossroads of the World ===
Grand Indonesia formerly features an area called Crossroads of the World, created by Legacy Entertainment. In this area there are 4 districts namely Entertainment District, Fashion District, Garden District and Market District. In 2011, the 2nd floor of Market District and half of the portion of Garden District were replaced with Toys Kingdom and Azko. In 2013, many of the district's decorations and elements were removed to make spaces for tenants. And in 2017 Crossroad of the World was fully removed from the mall's image and only half of Entertainment District, Fashion District and the 2nd Floor of Garden District still intact in the mall.

=== Dancing Fountain ===
Grand Indonesia also features a musical fountain show named "Dancing Fountain" (formerly named "Fountain Show" before 2017) that is located in Fountain Atrium West Mall level 3A and 5 that was themed in Rockefeller Center which is located in New York City. The songs featured in Dancing Fountain are Theme From New York New York, visitors can also find several variations of shows ranging from Andrew Lloyd Webber Medley and Rhapsody In Blue which are played all the time while Trans Siberian Orchestra Christmas and Sleigh Ride are played from November to January. Formerly there was a Chinese New Year song that was played from February to March but since 2011, the song has been discontinued. Dancing Fountain is shown every 3 hours on weekends and public holidays starting at 2, 5, and 8. The fountain is made by a fountain company from Florida, United States, name "Waltzing Waters".

Grand Indonesia uses Waltzing Waters type with 9 Section models. It is the only Waltzing Waters in Indonesia.

=== Fountain Atrium ===
Fountain Atrium is an atrium that features the Dancing Fountain, besides being used for the Dancing Fountain performance, the atrium is also used as a place for exhibitions, events and concerts.

The atrium was designed to be like Rockefeller Center and New York street. Then there is a projector screen used for showing New York pictures and commercials. The ceiling art depict buildings on the streets of New York and the Rockefeller Center building, inside there is also an iconic replica statue in the fountain, namely the Prometheus Rockefeller statue in New York. Since 2009, the Time Square facade was removed by tenants to fit their shop theme and in 2011, the projector screen was removed for the long LED screen made by Ilumin8 and no longer plays New York pictures. In December 2017, a new food court called Foodprint was built on the 2nd floor of the Fountain Atrium, this caused the Atrium to be not as dark as it used to be during the Dancing Fountain performance and it ruins the New York ambience and in 2019, the iconic Prometheus statue was removed for a bigger LED screen display.

=== Galeri Indonesia Kaya ===
Galeri Indonesia Kaya (GIK; Gallery of the Rich Indonesia) is an art gallery that showcases the opulence of Indonesian culture and biodiversity, which is located at the 8th floor of the West Mall. Its renovation in 2022 has transformed GIK into a state of the art digital gallery with large screens that have AR-based interactive games for visitors. The screens also have sensors that allow the software to interact with visitors, such as virtually cooking Indonesian traditional cuisines, flying over Indonesia and introducing Indonesian endemic faunas. It has an auditorium with 150 seats for drama performances and other purposes.

== Gallery ==
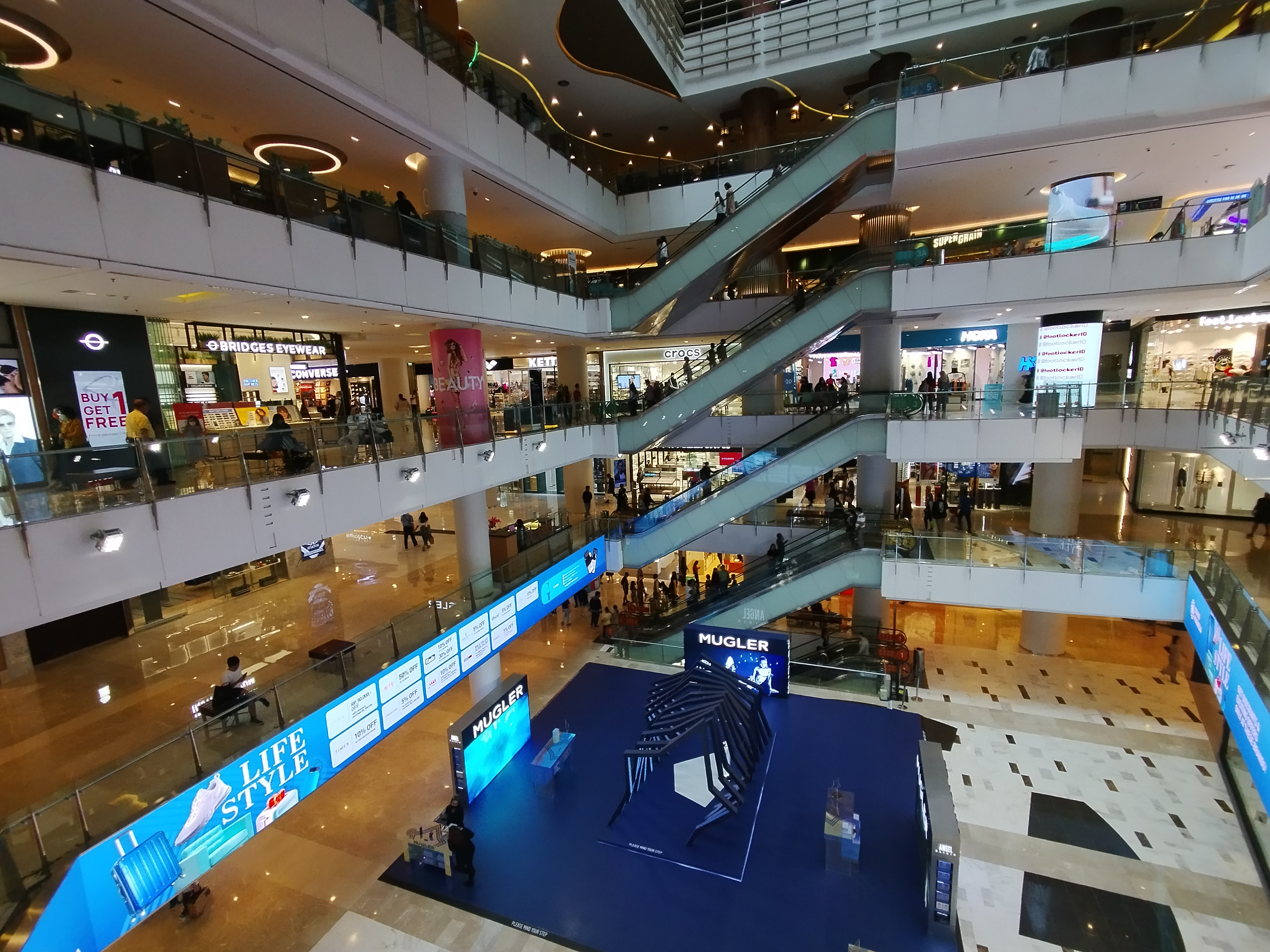
Main atrium at the 'East Mall' building

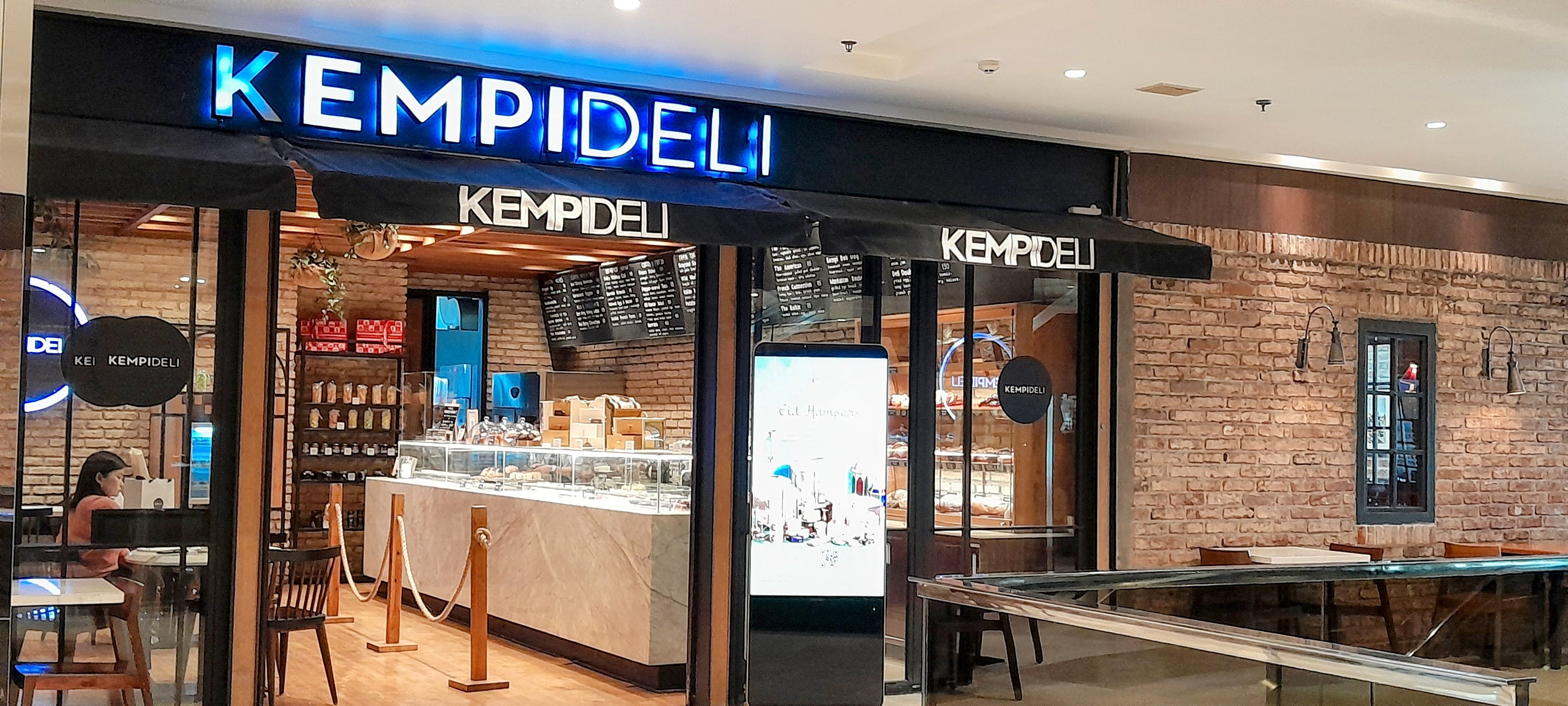
Kempideli store at Grand Indonesia

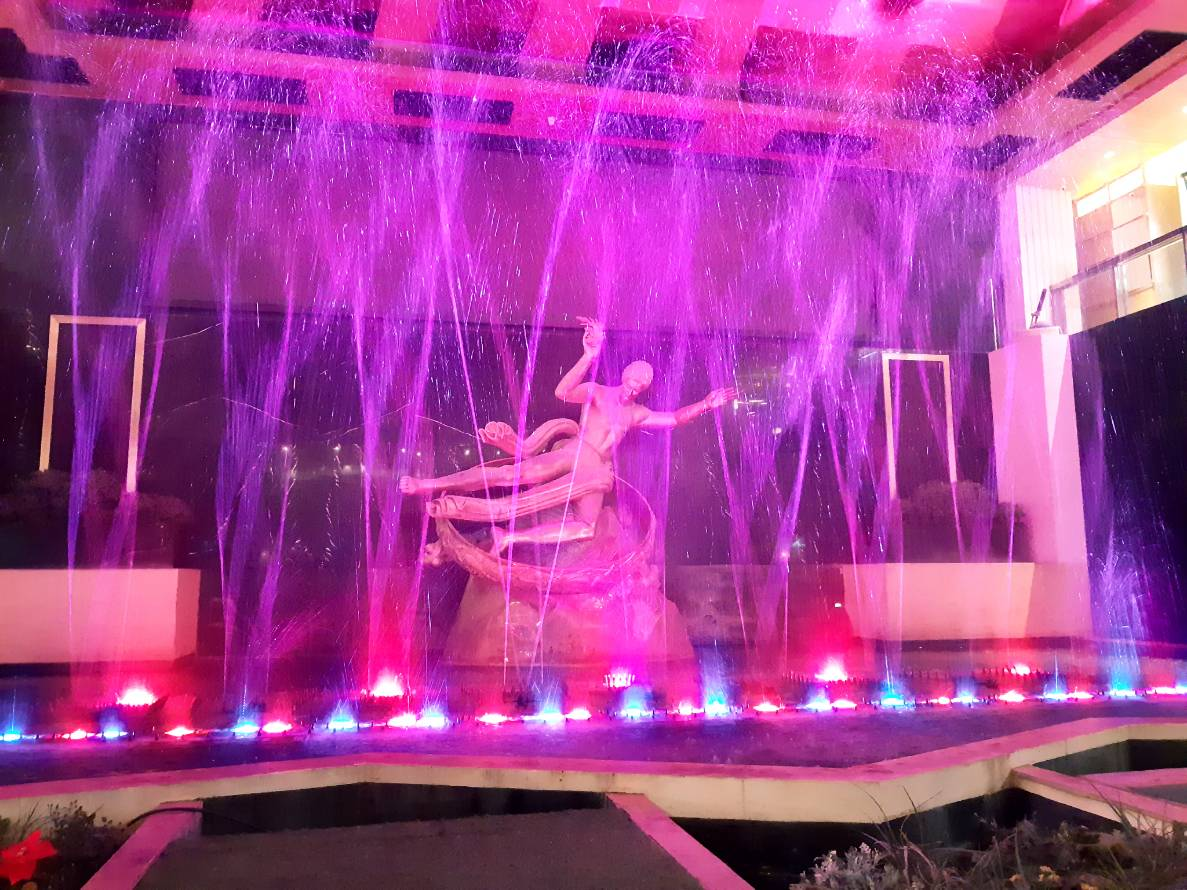
The dancing fountain atrium

An overall view of the Grand Indonesia complex, consist of Menara BCA (left tower), Hotel Indonesia and Kempinski Residences, Jakarta (right tower).

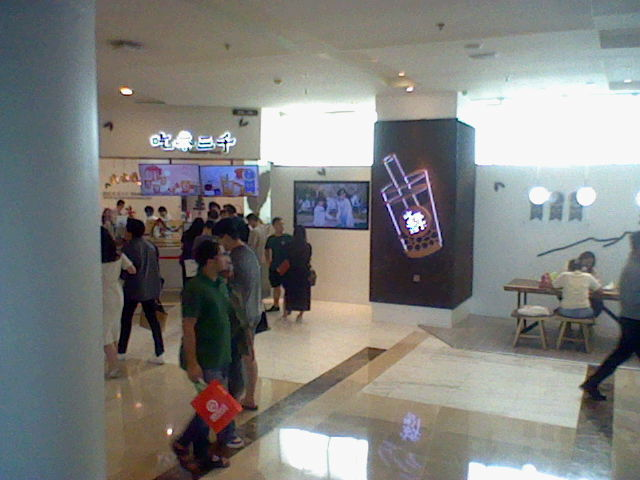
A Chi Cha San Chen outlet in East Mall.

== See also ==
- List of shopping malls in Indonesia
- List of tallest buildings in Jakarta
- List of largest buildings in the world
