= Blibli =

Indonesian e-commerce company

PT Global Digital Niaga Tbk
- Logo used since 4 October 2023
- Trade name: Blibli
- Type: Public
- Traded as: IDX: BELI
- Industry: e-commerce
- Founded: 12 March 2010; 16 years ago
- Founders: Kusumo Martanto; Martin Hartono; Lisa Widodo; Hendry; Lay Ridwan Gautama
- Owners: PT Global Investama Andalan (Djarum Group) (83.68%); Public (16.32%)
- Number of employees: 2,081 employees (excluding subsidiaries and/or associated companies) As per Q4 2022
- Website: www.blibli.com

PT Global Digital Niaga Tbk, doing business as Blibli, is an Indonesian e-commerce company.

== History ==
Blibli was founded in 2011 as a subsidiary of Djarum. The name Blibli is an abbreviation of beli-beli, Indonesian for "buy, buy".

Blibli's subsidiaries include tiket.com and supermarket chain Ranch Market.

Blibli became Indonesia's third unicorn startup through its initial public offering on the Indonesia Stock Exchange in late 2022. At 7.99 trillion rupiah (US$509.2 million), the listing was the second-largest of the year after GoTo in April.

== Services and operations ==
Blibli operates as an e-commerce platform in Indonesia, providing a variety of product categories such as electronics, household goods, fashion, and fresh produce. The company employs an omnichannel approach, including features like "Blibli InStore" and "Click & Collect," which enable customers to purchase items online and collect them at designated physical locations.

== Acquisitions and expansions ==
In June 2017, Blibli acquired Tiket.com, an online platform for travel and accommodation bookings. In September 2021, Blibli acquired a 70.56 percent stake in PT Supra Boga Lestari Tbk, which manages supermarket brands including Ranch Market and Farmers Market, for approximately Rp2.03 trillion. The company expanded further in 2023 by acquiring Dekoruma, an e-commerce platform specializing in furniture and home décor.

== GDP Ventures investment ==
GDP Ventures, founded by Martin Hartono, holds a majority stake in Blibli. Since its establishment, Blibli has received significant investment from GDP Ventures to support its growth and expansion.
