= Bank Central Asia =

Indonesian private bank

PT Bank Central Asia Tbk

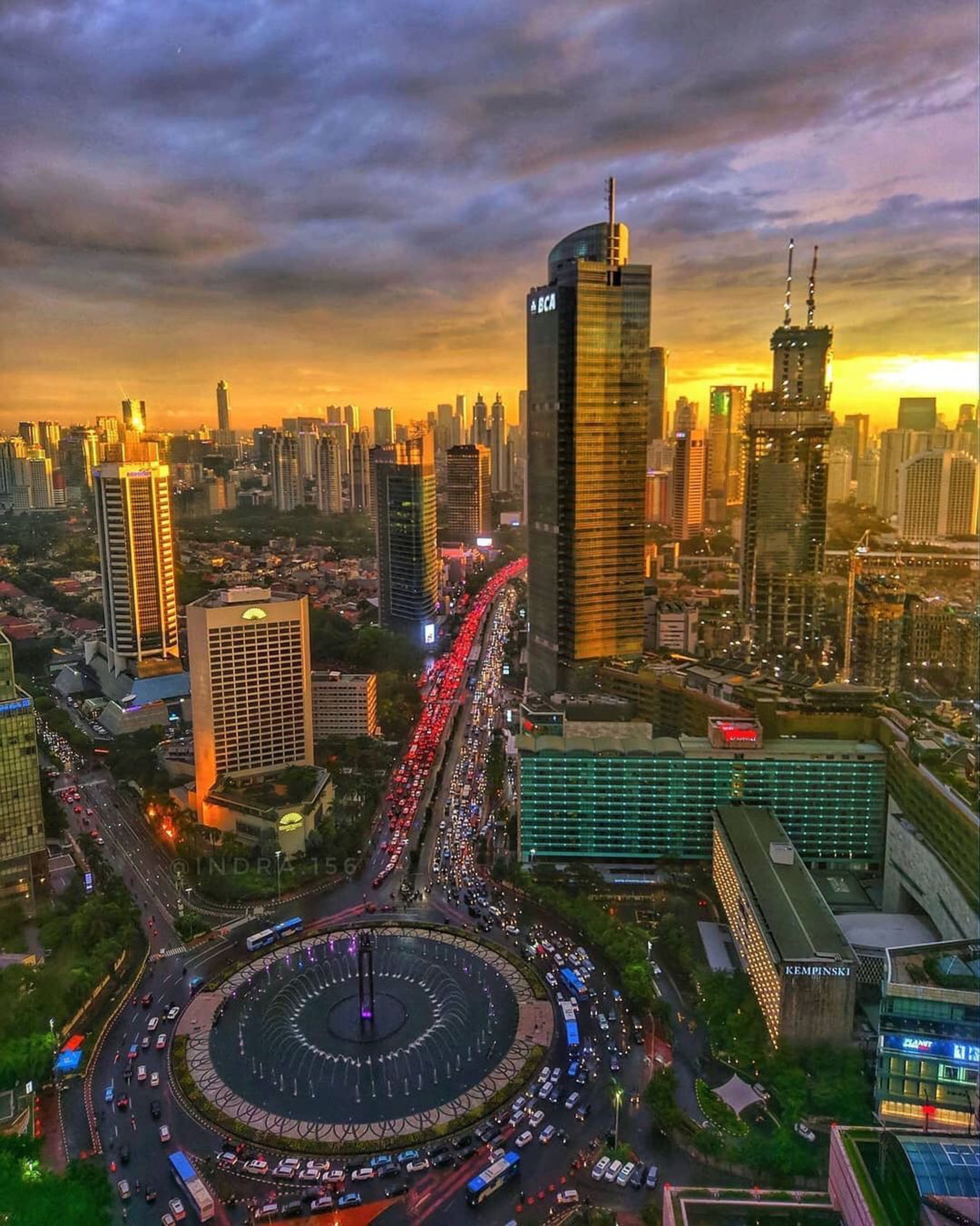
- BCA Tower (right) in Central Jakarta
- Type: Public
- Traded as: IDX: BBCA
- Industry: Financial services
- Founded: 1955; 71 years ago (as NV Perseroan Dagang Dan Industrie Semarang Knitting Factory); 21 February 1957; 69 years ago (as Bank Central Asia)
- Founder: Liem Sioe Liong
- Headquarters: BCA Tower, Central Jakarta, Jakarta, Indonesia
- Key people: Jahja Setiaatmadja (President Commissioner); Hendra Lembong (President Director); Armand Wahyudi Hartono (Deputy President Director); John Kosasih (Deputy President Director)
- Products: Retail banking Corporate banking Transaction banking Credit cards Mortgage loans Private banking Islamic banking Insurance; Securities
- Revenue: ▲ Rp 112.0 trillion (approx. US$6.2–6.8 billion) (2025)
- Net income: ▲ Rp 57.5 trillion (approx. US$3.5 billion) (2025)
- Total assets: ▲ Rp 1,586.8 trillion (approx. US$96 billion) (end-2025); Rp 1,640.8 trillion (March 2026)
- Total equity: Rp 281.7 trillion (end-2025)
- Owner: PT Dwimuria Investama Andalan (Djarum / Hartono family) (54.94%)
- Number of employees: 26,435–27,937 (2025)
- Subsidiaries: BCA Finance; Bank BCA Syariah; Bank Digital BCA; BCA Securities; Asuransi Umum BCA; Asuransi Jiwa BCA; Central Capital Ventura
- Website: www.bca.co.id

PT Bank Central Asia Tbk (BCA) is an Indonesian universal bank and the largest private bank in the country by assets and market capitalisation. It is headquartered at the BCA Tower in Central Jakarta and controlled by the Hartono family (owners of the Djarum Group) through PT Dwimuria Investama Andalan.

As of the end of 2025, BCA had total assets of Rp 1,586.8 trillion (approximately US$96 billion) and recorded a net profit of Rp 57.5 trillion (approximately US$3.5 billion). The bank serves more than 43 million customer accounts and processes over 115 million transactions daily.

BCA has been ranked the best bank in Indonesia by Forbes World’s Best Banks for multiple consecutive years, including 2026.

== History ==
Bank Central Asia traces its origins to 1955, when it was established in Semarang as NV Perseroan Dagang Dan Industrie Semarang Knitting Factory by Chinese-Indonesian businessman Sudono Salim (Liem Sioe Liong). The company held a banking licence and began formal banking operations on 21 February 1957 after moving its head office to Jakarta under the name Bank Central Asia.

In the mid-1970s, banker Mochtar Riady was brought in to professionalise the bank. On 2 September 1975 the name was formally changed to PT Bank Central Asia. The bank obtained a foreign-exchange licence in 1977 and expanded rapidly during the banking deregulation of the 1980s. It introduced online branch systems and the popular Tahapan savings products.

In the early 1990s BCA pioneered ATM networks in Indonesia, installing its first 50 machines in Jakarta in 1991 and partnering with Telkom and Citibank for bill payments. By the mid-1990s it had become one of Indonesia’s largest private banks.

The 1997 Asian financial crisis and the May 1998 riots triggered a severe bank run. In 1998 BCA was placed under the Indonesian Bank Restructuring Agency (IBRA/BPPN) as a Bank Take Over. In 1999 it was fully recapitalised, with the government taking 92.8% ownership in exchange for liquidity support and the conversion of related-party loans into government bonds.

The government began divesting its stake through an IPO in 2000 and a secondary offering in 2001. In 2002 a consortium led by Farindo Investment (ultimately controlled by the Hartono brothers of the Djarum Group) acquired 51% of BCA through a strategic private placement. The government fully exited by 2005. Under the new ownership the bank recovered strongly, focusing on transaction banking, technology, and digital channels.

In the 2010s and 2020s BCA continued expanding its digital offerings while selectively growing its physical network, particularly in Eastern Indonesia. In February 2026 it became the first conventional bank in Indonesia and Southeast Asia to receive ISO/IEC 42001 certification for Artificial Intelligence Management Systems.

== Operations and network ==
BCA operates almost exclusively within Indonesia and follows a hybrid banking model that combines a large physical network with advanced digital channels.

As of the end of 2025 the bank operated approximately 1,270 branch offices and 20,163 ATMs (many of them cash-recycling machines). It divides the country into 12 regional offices. Despite industry-wide branch closures, BCA has continued selective expansion, especially in Eastern Indonesia and suburban areas, arguing that physical presence remains important for complex transactions and customer trust. While roughly 99.8% of transaction frequency is digital, branches still account for more than 30% of total transaction value.

== Digital banking and payment systems ==
BCA is widely regarded as one of Indonesia’s strongest digital banks.

The main platforms are myBCA (the primary modern application), BCA mobile, KlikBCA (internet banking), and Sakuku (electronic money). myBCA supports transfers, bill payments, QRIS, and has been extended to smartwatches.

BCA was an early adopter of QR payments. After Bank Indonesia launched the national standard QRIS (Quick Response Code Indonesian Standard), BCA fully migrated its systems. Customers can use QRIS via myBCA, BCA mobile, and Sakuku in Merchant Presented Mode, Consumer Presented Mode, and QRIS Tap (NFC). QRIS is used for retail payments, peer-to-peer transfers, public transport, parking, and limited cross-border transactions.

== Opening an account ==
Customers can open a BCA savings account either at a branch or fully online through the myBCA or BCA mobile applications.

Main requirements for Indonesian citizens include:

- Minimum age of 17 years
- Valid e-KTP
- Active mobile phone number and email address
- Selfie photo and signature on white paper (for online applications)
- NPWP (optional for some products such as Tahapan Xpresi)

Initial deposits vary by product (for example Rp 50,000 for Tahapan Xpresi and Rp 500,000 for standard Tahapan). Online applications include identity verification via video call with BCA customer service.

== Foreign presence ==
BCA has deliberately limited its international footprint, preferring to focus on the large domestic market. It previously maintained representative offices in Hong Kong and Singapore. The Hong Kong representative office was closed in August 2025. BCA Finance Limited in Hong Kong was liquidated in early 2026. The bank has no significant overseas retail branch network.

== Subsidiaries ==
Major subsidiaries as of 2025–2026 include:

- PT BCA Finance (vehicle and multipurpose financing) – 100%
- PT Bank BCA Syariah (Islamic banking) – 100%
- PT Bank Digital BCA (digital bank) – 100%
- PT BCA Sekuritas (securities) – 90%
- PT Asuransi Umum BCA (general insurance) – 100%
- PT Asuransi Jiwa BCA (life insurance) – 90%
- PT Central Capital Ventura (venture capital) – 100%

== Controversies ==
BCA has generally maintained a relatively clean reputation compared with some other Indonesian banks, but it has faced occasional issues involving employee misconduct and customer complaints.

=== 2023 OJK fine ===
In 2023 the Financial Services Authority (OJK) imposed a Rp 100 million administrative fine on BCA in its capacity as custodian bank related to violations by mutual-fund manager PT Berlian Aset Manajemen.

=== 2026 Malang (Kepanjen) fictitious deposit case ===
In June 2026 a case involving a customer of BCA’s Kepanjen branch in Kabupaten Malang went viral on social media. The customer claimed a loss of approximately Rp 987 million after allegedly being offered a non-standard “internal deposit” product by a then-active BCA customer service officer, Farida Eko Setyowati, between late 2022 and 2025. According to the customer’s account, cash deposits were made inside the branch, official-looking documents and deposit slips (some later alleged to be fake) were provided, and part of the funds was diverted. The customer also claimed that an ATM card for a TabunganKu account in her child’s name was created without her knowledge.

The case attracted significant public attention and criticism because the alleged transactions took place inside the bank premises over a period of years. BCA later involved its head office; the matter was reported to have been resolved through mediation, with the customer accepting a lower amount of compensation and closing the case.

Critics highlighted the bank’s initial handling and the fact that the alleged fraud occurred within a branch environment. BCA has emphasised in similar cases that it investigates employee misconduct and that its core systems remain secure, while stressing that customers should only use official products and verify transactions through official channels.

=== Other issues ===
There have been other isolated reports of phishing and employee-related fraud. The 2002 privatisation of BCA has also periodically been criticised as underpriced; the bank has rejected these claims, stating that the sale followed transparent government procedures and market conditions at the time.

No major systemic scandals comparable to large-scale money-laundering fines at some peer banks have been recorded against BCA in recent years.

== Recognition ==
BCA has repeatedly been named Indonesia’s best bank by Forbes World’s Best Banks (including 2026) and is frequently recognised for transaction banking strength, digital services, and customer satisfaction.

== See also ==
- List of banks in Indonesia
- Djarum
- QRIS
- LQ45
