= Djarum =

Indonesian tobacco company

PT Djarum
- Type: Private
- Industry: Tobacco; Conglomerate
- Founded: 21 April 1951; 75 years ago
- Founder: Oei Wie Gwan
- Headquarters: Kudus, Central Java, Indonesia
- Key people: Michael Bambang Hartono; Robert Budi Hartono
- Products: Cigarette
- Owner: Hartono family
- Number of employees: 60,000 (2024)
- Parent: Djarum Group (PT Dwimuria Investama Andalan)
- Website: www.djarum.com

PT Djarum (Indonesian pronunciation: [ˈdʒarʊm]) is an Indonesian cigarette manufacturer and conglomerate based in Kudus, Central Java. It produces dozens of domestic and international brands, mainly kretek (clove cigarette). Djarum Black, Super, and L.A. Lights are among the most popular products of Djarum. Under its direct parent, PT Dwimuria Investama Andalan (also known as Djarum Group), it has non-cigarette business lines in technology, banking, and food.

The group owns the PB Djarum, a professional badminton club, the Italian football club Como, and was the main sponsor of Indonesia's top football league, including the Divisi Utama from 2005 to 2008 and Indonesia Super League (ISL), from 2008 to 2011.

== History ==
In 1951, Oei Wie Gwan, an Indonesian businessman who immigrated from China in 1920, acquired NV Murup, a nearly defunct cigarette company in Kudus, Central Java. NV Murup's most popular brand of cigarettes was called Djarum Gramofon (English: gramophone needle); Gwan shortened the name to Djarum (needle). The company nearly collapsed in 1963 when its factory was destroyed in a fire around the time of Oei's death. Oei's sons Budi and Bambang Hartono took over the company and began the process of rebuilding it.

The company began producing machine-rolled kretek in the late 1970s, but it also continues to produce hand-rolled kretek made by manual labourers. In 2016, Djarum and several other tobacco companies in Indonesia were implicated by Human Rights Watch for the use of child labor without hand protection.

Through its expansion into various other non-cigarette sectors, including food, drink, banking, garments, and technology, in the 1980s and 1990s Djarum became one of the top five largest conglomerates within Indonesia. By 2010, Djarum Group was the largest conglomerate in Indonesia.

After the 1997 Asian financial crisis, the company became a part of a consortium that bought Bank Central Asia (BCA) from BPPN. BCA is the largest private bank in Indonesia and was formerly a part of the Salim Group. Presently, the majority stake of the bank (51%) is controlled by Djarum. In 2004, Djarum acquired a 30-year BOT contract from the government to develop and renovate Hotel Indonesia in Jakarta under the Grand Indonesia superblock project.

The Djarum badminton club, PB Djarum, was founded in 1974 by Budi Hartono. Its players, such as Liem Swie King and Alan Budikusuma, have won numerous championships for Indonesia.

Djarum's kreteks enjoyed a high level of popularity among smokers in the United States during the clove cigarette fad of the 1980s. Since 2009, most flavoured cigarettes in the United States have been banned following the passing of the Family Smoking Prevention and Tobacco Control Act. To circumvent the ban, Djarum's clove products are now marketed as "filtered cigars" and are wrapped in a black paper. They are packaged in boxes of 20.

== Non-cigarette business lines ==
Through its direct investments, or its venture capital arm (GDP Venture), or other arms, as of 2026 Djarum Group has known investments in business as follows:

=== Banking Services ===
- Bank Central Asia (PT Bank Central Asia Tbk), largest private bank in Indonesia
- ALTO (PT ALTO Network), interbank network

=== Retail ===
- Blibli (PT Global Digital Niaga Tbk), e-commerce and electronic retail store, which also hold shares in:
  - Tiket.com (PT Global Tiket Network), online travel agency and booking platform
  - Ranch Market (PT Supra Boga Lestari Tbk), Indonesian licensed supermarket chain
  - Dekoruma (PT Dekoruma Inovasi Lestari), interior design and furniture retail store
- Bakmi GM (PT Griya Miesejati), noodle restaurant chain

=== Manufacturing ===
- Savoria Group, FMCG manufacturer with various subsidiaries and known brands such as; BonChef, 5Days, MilkLife, Kopi Tubruk Gadjah, Caffino, Fox's, Krizzi, Hydroplus, and Sariwangi
- Polytron (PT Hartono Istana Teknologi), manufacturer of electronic appliances and electric vehicles

=== Property ===
- Grand Indonesia, multipurpose complex in Central Jakarta
- Margo City, shopping mall in Depok
- Padma Hotels, hotels and resorts located in Bandung, Bali, Semarang, and Karawang
- Pulogadung Trade Center, trade center in East Jakarta
- Resinda Park Mall, multipurpose complex in Karawang
- WTC Mangga Dua, trade center in North Jakarta

=== Others ===
- HPI Agro (PT Hartono Plantation Indonesia), operates in agrobusiness, including plantations of palm oil, cloves, tobacco, sugarcane, castor bean, and essential oils.
- SMN (PT Sarana Menara Nusantara Tbk), telecommunications infrastructure provider
- GDP Venture (PT Global Digital Prima), investment portfolio also includes: Agate (video game), Visinema Pictures (film production), IDN Times (digital media), 88rising (record label)
- SENT Entertainment, London based media company which also controls:
  - Como 1907, Italian football club currently competes in Serie A

== Involvement in sports ==
- PB Djarum (badminton club funded by Djarum Foundation)
- Sponsorship of Indonesian top league:
  - 2005–2007 as Liga Djarum Indonesia
  - 2008–2011 as Djarum Indonesia Super League
- Como 1907 (Italian football club) via SENT Entertainment
- Garuda Select (football talent development acceleration program)
- Djarum Superchallenge Super Prix (local motorsport race in Indonesia)
- Djarum 76 Trial Game (trial motorsport competition in Indonesia)

== Products ==
- Djarum Istimewa
- Djarum 76
- Djarum Coklat
- Djarum Super Kretek
- Djarum Safari
- Djarum D Wraps
- Djarum Black Matcha
- Djarum Sejuk
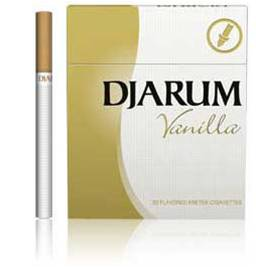
Djarum Vanilla

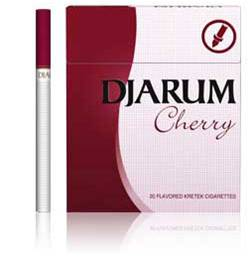
Djarum Cherry

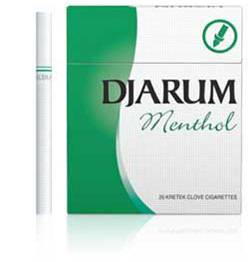
Djarum Menthol

== Works cited ==
- Borsuk, Richard; Nancy Chng (2014). Liem Sioe Liong's Salim Group: The Business Pillar of Suharto's Indonesia. Institute of Southeast Asian Studies. ISBN 9789814459570 – via Google Books.
- Jilberto, Alex E. Fernández; Barbara Hogenboom (2006). Big Business and Economic Development: Conglomerates and Economic Groups in Developing Countries and Transition Economies Under Globalisation. Taylor & Francis. ISBN 9781134125753 – via Google Books.
- Suryadinata, Leo (2015). Prominent Indonesian Chinese: Biographical Sketches. ISEAS – Yusof Ishak Institute. ISBN 9789814620505 – via Google Books.
- Welker, Marina (2024). Kretek Capitalism: Making, Marketing, and Consuming Clove Cigarettes in Indonesia. University of California Press. ISBN 9780520399679 – via Google Books.
