= Hotel Indonesia =

Hotel in Jakarta, Indonesia

Hotel Indonesia Kempinski Jakarta

- Hotel Indonesia at day
- Hotel chain: Kempinski Hotels

General information
- Architectural style: International Style
- Location: Jakarta, Indonesia
- Coordinates: 6°11′44″S 106°49′19″E
- Opening: 5 August 1962; 64 years ago
- Operator: Sjefke Jansen (General Manager)

Design and construction
- Architect: Abel Sorensen

Other information
- Number of rooms: 289
- Number of suites: 11
- Number of restaurants: 4
- Number of bars: 2
- Facilities: Rooftop Spa with Gym & Swimming Pool
- Public transit: Bundaran HI Bank Jakarta; Bundaran HI Astra

Website
- www.kempinski.com

The Hotel Indonesia Kempinski Jakarta is one of the oldest and best-known hotels in Jakarta, Indonesia. Located in Central Jakarta, it was one of the first 5-star hotels in Southeast Asia and remains a major landmark of Jakarta. Its fame is often linked to Indonesia's political pride. It is located by the famed Hotel Indonesia Roundabout, which gets its name from the hotel. It is adjacent to the Grand Indonesia and Plaza Indonesia shopping malls.

== History ==
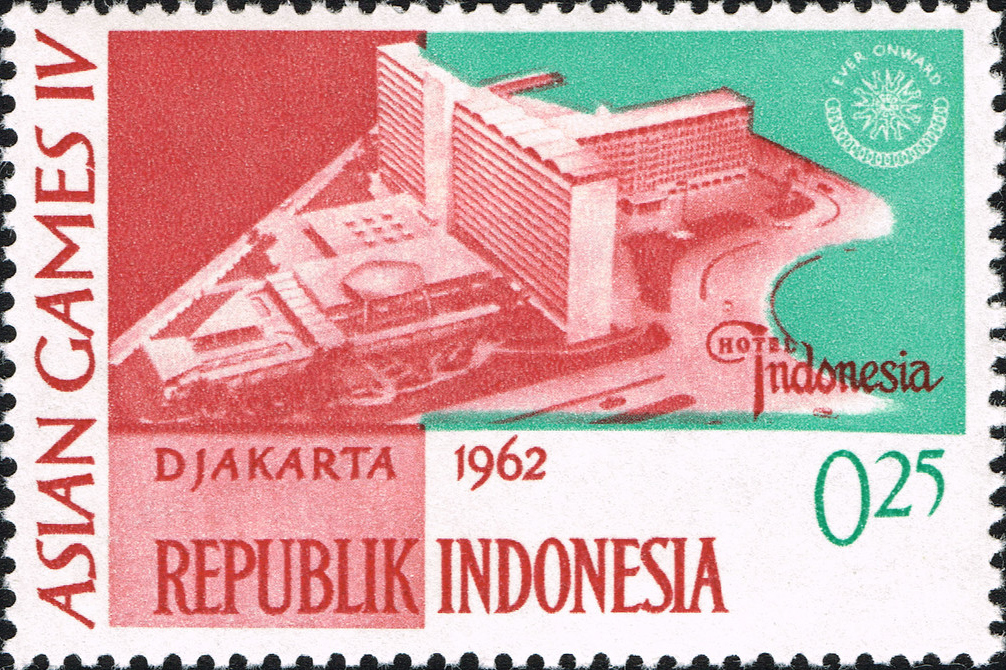
Hotel Indonesia complex sketch in a stamp welcoming the 1962 Asian Games

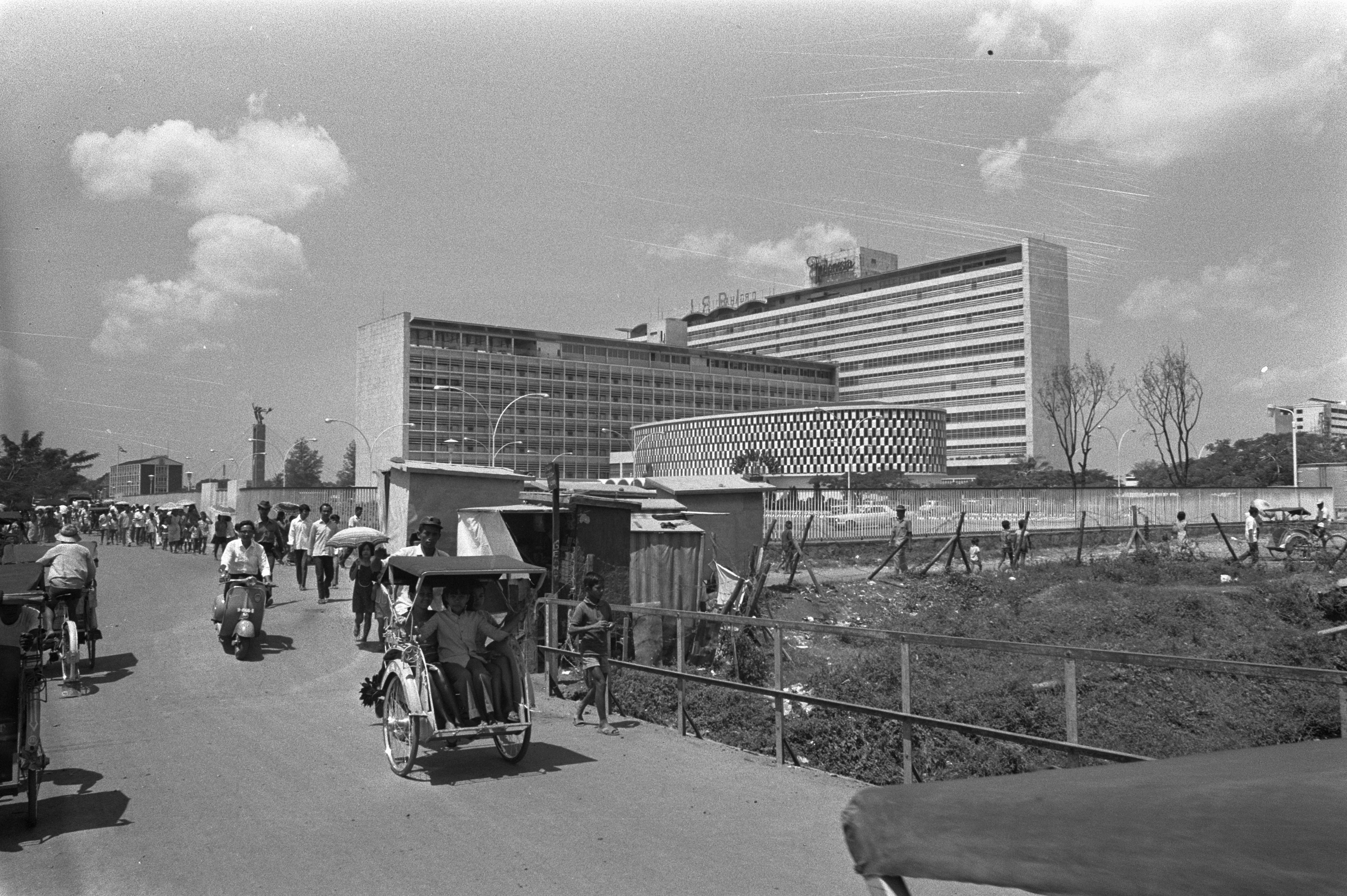
Western part of Hotel Indonesia, 1971

Occupying 25,082 m^{2} (269,980 sq ft) of land, the Hotel Indonesia was designed by Danish architect, Abel Sorensen, and his wife, Wendy Becker. The hotel was constructed by Indonesia's first president, Sukarno, in preparation for the 1962 Asian Games, to showcase a modern Indonesia to the world.

The Hotel Indonesia, which was operated by Intercontinental Hotels until 1974, opened for business on July 16, 1962. The grand opening was held on August 5, 1962, attended by President Sukarno. In front of the hotel, located in the heart of the capital, stands the Welcome Monument, intended to welcome guests visiting Jakarta for the Asian Games. Following the games, the hotel was used by President Sukarno to host state guests, and also official events.

During its heyday, Hotel Indonesia was the center of many cultural activities. Musical and theatrical performances were routinely staged at the hotel, which served as a launch pad for several renowned Indonesian stars, including Teguh Karya who was the hotel's stage manager, Slamet Rahardjo and Rima Melati. In 1969, the Hotel Indonesia hosted the Miss Indonesia pageant, won by Irma Hardisurya. By the 1970s, the Nirwana Supper Club on the highest terrace of the Ramayana Wing was the venue of choice for Jakarta elites to enjoy a fancy dinner, complete with live entertainment by popular musicians, local and international. The hotel was operated by Sheraton Hotels from 1977 to 1981 as the Hotel Indonesia Sheraton.

The Hotel Indonesia was declared a national cultural heritage site by the decree of the Governor of DKI Jakarta No. 475 on 29 March 1993. The decree commanded that the building and all of its historical assets should be well preserved and maintained.

Hotel Indonesia under renovation, 2007

In 2004, the government-owned hotel was closed for a complete renovation. It reopened on 20 May 2009 as the Hotel Indonesia Kempinski, managed by Kempinski Hotels under the ownership of Djarum, the oldest luxury hotel group in Europe.

== Facilities ==
The hotel originally had 406 guestrooms, then it was reduced to 289 during the 2004 renovation. The hotel consists of two wings, the 16-story Ramayana Wing and the 8-story Ganesha Wing, including a Presidential Suite and four Diplomatic Suites. The Ramayana Wing features two types of guest rooms: Deluxe rooms (44 square meters) and Grand Deluxe rooms, which range in size from 58 to 62 square meters with total of 129 rooms. The Ganesha Wing was designed for premium business travelers. It contains 160 rooms, consisting of 1 super-secured, bulletproof Presidential Suite, 4 Diplomatic Suites, 6 Salon Suites, 90 Executive Grand Deluxe, and 59 Deluxe rooms, complemented by a Lounge on the 7th floor.

The hotel originally boasted a large Olympic-size swimming pool in its backyard. In the 2004 renovation, it was replaced by a smaller swimming pool on the roof terrace. The Grand Indonesia shopping mall now stands on the site of the original pool.

The 3,000-square-meter Kempinski Grand Ballroom opened in March 2008 and has held various corporate activities, exhibitions weddings, and events. The historical oval-shaped 1,000-square-meter Bali Room has been operating since September 2008.
