= Smoking in Indonesia =

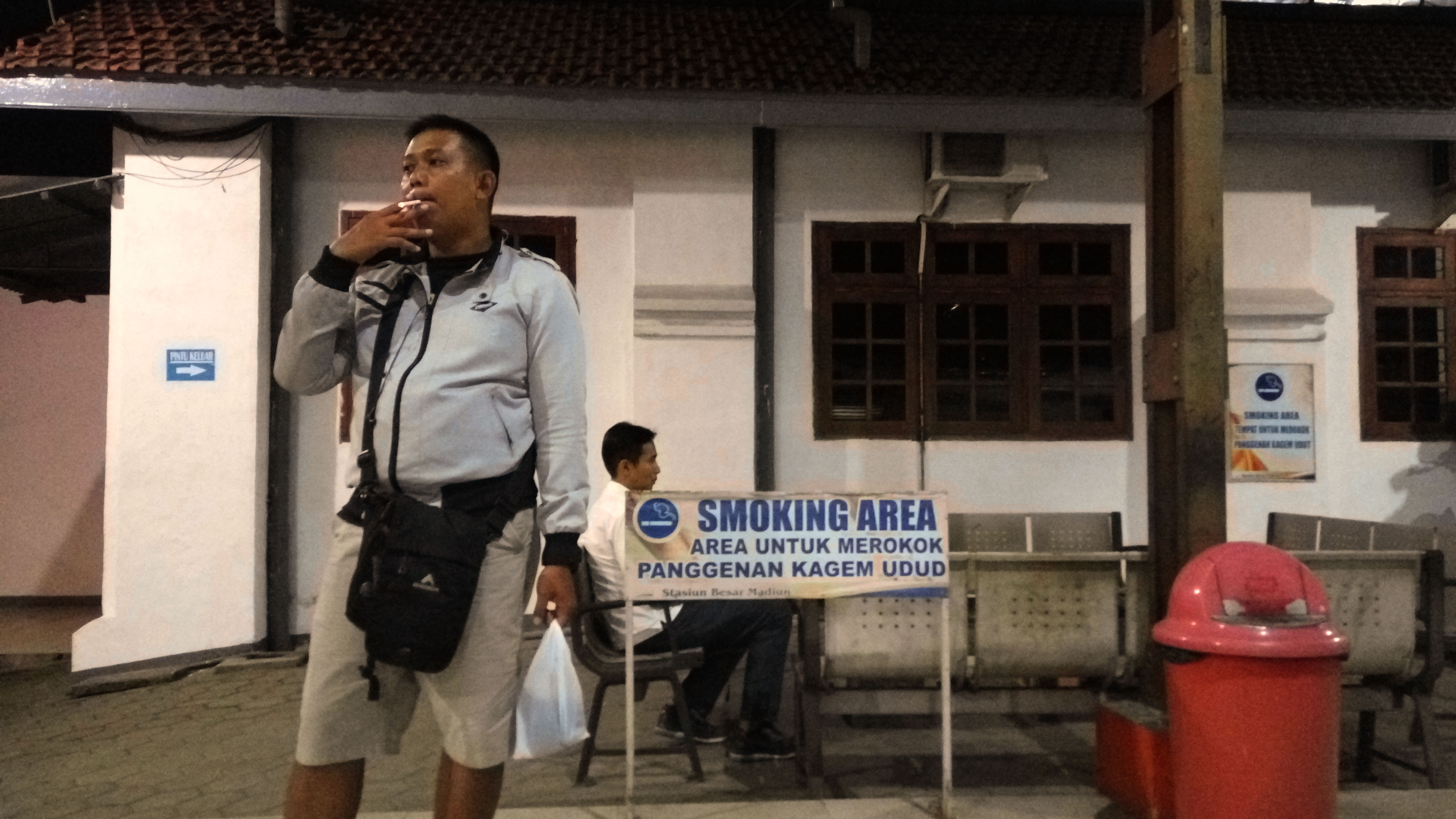
Smoking area in Sidoarjo Station

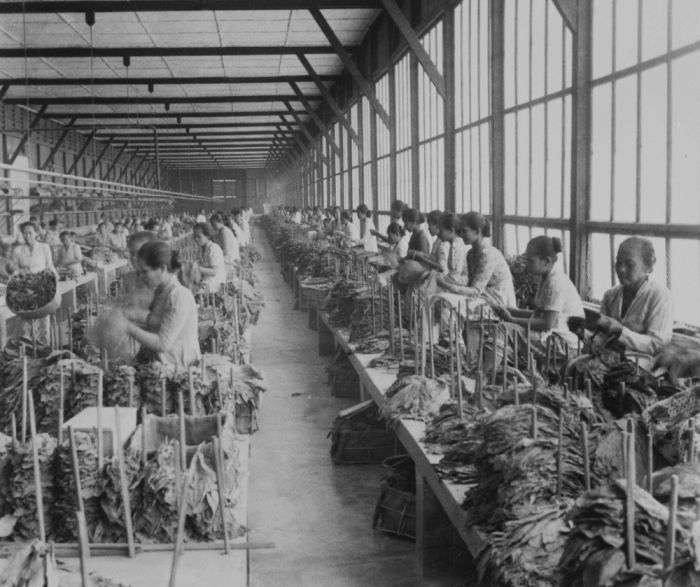
Tobacco factory in Tanjung Morawa

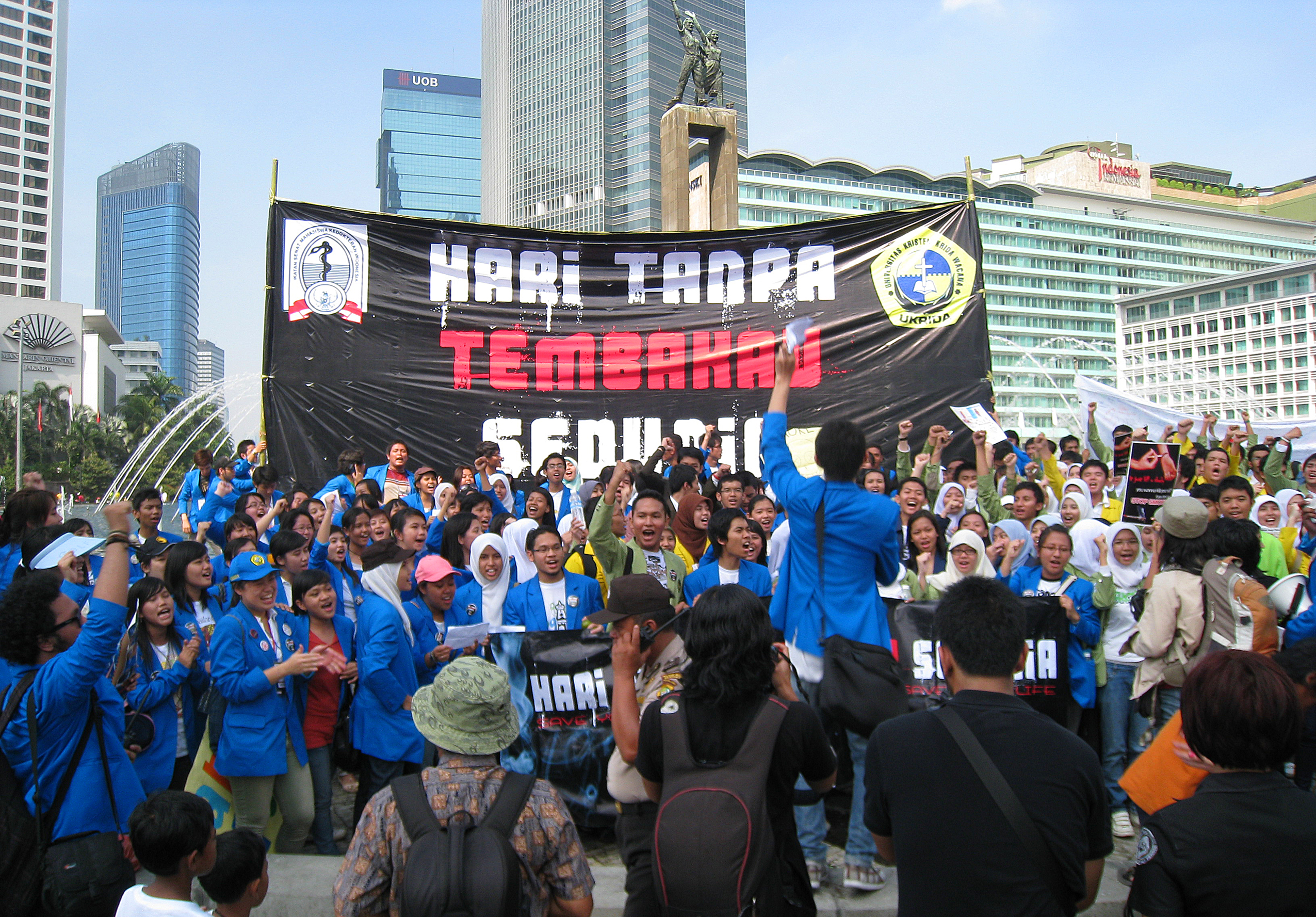
Anti-tobacco protest in Jakarta

There are approximately 70.2 million smokers in Indonesia, among a population of 278 million people.Around 65.5% of men and 3.3% of women report smoking, equating to 34.5% of the population. The majority, 85% of Indonesian smokers, use clove-flavored kreteks. Kretek manufacturers directly employ over 600,000 people in Indonesia and an additional 6 million indirectly. Indonesia is the second largest tobacco market in the world, and in 2023 over 318 billion cigarettes were sold in the country.

Major tobacco companies dominating the market in Indonesia according to the year of establishment include:

- HM Sampoerna (Philip Morris International, 1913).
- Bentoel International Investama (British American Tobacco, 1930).
- Nojorono Tobacco International (1932).
- Djarum (1951).
- Gudang Garam (1958).
- Tri Sakti Purwosari Makmur (KT&G, 1974).
- Wismilak Inti Makmur (1994).

The WHO has ranked Indonesia third in the world for total number of smokers.

== Kretek cigarettes ==
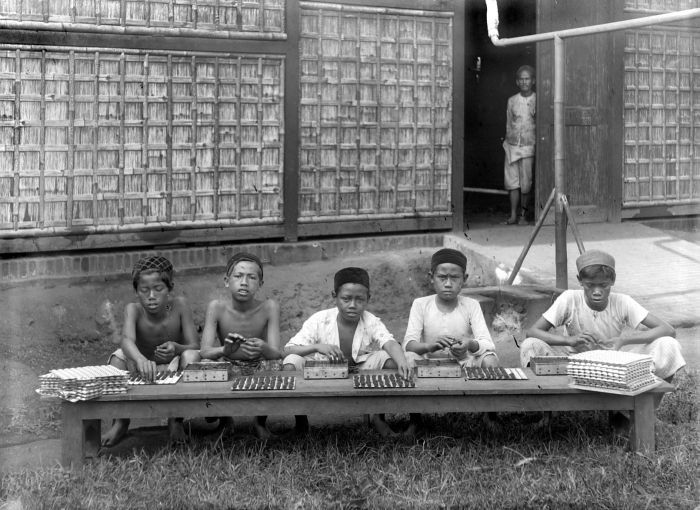
Child labour in the Kretek industry of the Dutch East Indies era

Kretek is credited as an invention by Nitisemito of Kudus, an industrial town in Central Java. They emerged in the late 19th century in Java. The practice was to roll, by hand, a compound of tobacco, cloves and cocoa in a dry corn husk wrap, which gives a honeyed flavour. It was Nitisemito who introduced cigarette papers in place of corn husk; following this simple innovation, a Kretek manufacturing factory was opened in Sumatra. The first brand of cigarette produced in this factory, "Bal Tiga" (three balls), became very popular, and as result, the economy of Kudus prospered.

The inventor popularized his brand of cigarettes through a concerted media campaign, even establishing his own radio station for the purpose. He touted his habit of smoking kretek as the cure for his asthma. Intense competition (25 manufactures are now reported in the city and its suburbs) combined with poor management resulted in his eventual financial failure, when he died in 1953. Another brand is Gudang Garam, founded by Chinese Indonesian businessman Surya Wonowidjojo. It has the distinction of being the largest single employer in Indonesia.

Kretek is very popular in rural areas as this type of cigarette is cheap. Kretek is known to burn slowly, and also self-extinguish. Evidence seems to suggest oral lesions may be less common than with other cigarette types. Due to this effect, cigarette smoking has largely replaced betel chewing.

The term "Kretek" is onomatopoeic, referring to the crackling sound that is produced when such cigarettes are burnt and inhaled.

Kretek cigarettes contain high concentration of tar and nicotine, approximately four times that of the strongest Marlboros. Some countries (such as the United States) have banned marketing flavoured cigarettes (including kreteks), as these are often seen as more appealing to the youth. The other harmful effect mentioned is from the clove oil used in making Kretek. The clove oil or eugenol is harmful to the lungs. The Indonesian Department of Health reported in 2000 that 200,000 people are affected by cancer every year but eugenols exact relation to smoking has not been evaluated. Due to the popularity of Kretek, 5% of the national revenue is from this source, next only to the revenue from oil. Indonesia also records the highest growth of cigarette industry in the world, accounting for 4% of the world consumption.

While cigarette smoking is declining throughout the world, in Indonesia, the industry continues to thrive. Indonesia has one of the highest smoking rates in the world and is currently one of the biggest producers of tobacco worldwide, with Malaysia and the United States being two of their important markets. There are hundreds of tobacco companies in the country, with Gudang Garam, Djarum, Sampoerna, Bentoel and Wismilak dominating the Indonesian market share.

Kretek was initially a habit of the lower classes of society. However, it has now become very popular among the "middle class and intelligentsia, to the extent that it has become very de rigueur and a mark of Indonesian-ness."

== Harmful effects and regulations ==
Tobacco smoking in Indonesia is said to claim 300,000 lives every year. Even though Indonesia has required "no smoking" signs in health care units, educational institutions and in public transportation system, there is no ban on smoking in government and private offices, restaurants and bars. Tax exemptions in Indonesia provide an incentive to the manufacturers to advertise the sale of cigarettes as compared to other countries in the region, in spite of the World Bank suggesting higher tax rates. As a result, tobacco manufacturers almost run cigarette advertisements for free. All these factors, plus its low cost, have contributed to the extensive proliferation of cigarette smoking in Indonesia among people of all ages.

So much so, that even a two-year-old child picked up the habit of smoking two packs of cigarettes a day in his fishing village, where every one smokes. It was reported that the child's grandfather initiated his son into this habit at the age of 18 months. However, press reports indicate that the child has been placed in rehabilitation by keeping him in a different environment under the care of a psychologist, and as a result the child has given up smoking. The government of Indonesia is now contemplating introducing regulations that would ban the advertising of cigarettes, smoking in public places and selling cigarettes to children.

Today, current regulation on cigarettes and smoking is the Govt. Regulation No. 28/2024. It defines "tobacco products" as "any products that partly or fully made of tobacco leaves, and may be taken into the body by smoking, vaping, ingestion, inhalation, etc." The "tobacco product" term includes but is not limited to cigarettes, cigars, kreteks, klembak menyan, smokeless tobacco, electronic cigarettes, and other similar products. In Indonesia, selling such products are prohibited for people under 21 and pregnant women. Selling cigarette (or similar products) by the stick are also prohibited.

== Main issues ==
=== Cigarette advertisements ===
Unlike the rest of the world, cigarette advertising is still allowed in Indonesia, and as of 2021, Indonesia is the only country in the world to allow cigarette advertising. However, it is prohibited to show cigarettes and advertising must include smoking warning messages. In Indonesia itself, such advertisements known under the name iklan rokok in Indonesian. In 2003, cigarette advertising and promotions in Indonesia was valued at $250 million. In addition to television and outdoor advertisements, sporting events and music concerts sponsored by cigarette brands or companies also occur.

=== Child smoking ===
According to an official spokesman of the Indonesian Child Protection Commission (KPAI) and evolve regulations to prevent children getting addicted to smoking, "The future of 80 million Indonesian children is at stake as the cigarette producers were intentionally aiming children as their future market through massive TV advertisements and sponsorships on activities in which teenagers involved the most."

More than 30% of Indonesian children reportedly smoke a cigarette before the age of 10. In 2010, a two-year-old boy from Sumatra, Ardi Rizal, made global headlines for having a 40-a-day cigarette habit.

In 2003, cigarette advertising and promotion in Indonesia was valued at $250 million. It is thus one of the most distinctive tobacco manufacturing hubs in the world. Smoking Kretek is said to be "an ingrained part of Indonesian culture". An all pervading scent of kretek smoke is distinctly discerned in Indonesia.

== Bans ==
In Jakarta's restaurants, hotels, office buildings, airports and public transport, and overall public areas smoking is not permitted. Restaurants wanting to allow smoking must provide a separate smoking space, as of 4 February 2006. Building separate facilities for smokers had only taken place in half of establishments by June 2007.

Smoke-free regulations were extended to Bali in November 2011, affecting tourist sites, including restaurants and hotels; plus schools, government buildings, places of worship and other public places. A ban on sale and advertising tobacco in schools was also enacted, although this would not stop tobacco companies offering sponsorship to schools. However, regulations were not strong enough, leading to a new stricter promulgation for June 2012.

Smoking in trains of the state-owned company PT Kereta Api Indonesia has been banned as of 1 March 2012.

Bali has banned smoking to be effective 1 June 2012, also having heavy fines. Hotels, restaurants, tourist attractions, places of worship, healthcare facilities and schools are to be smoke-free areas. Smoking and tobacco advertising have also been banned in playgrounds, traditional and modern markets, transportation terminals, airports, government offices and on public transportation.

== Gallery ==
Smoking in Indonesia

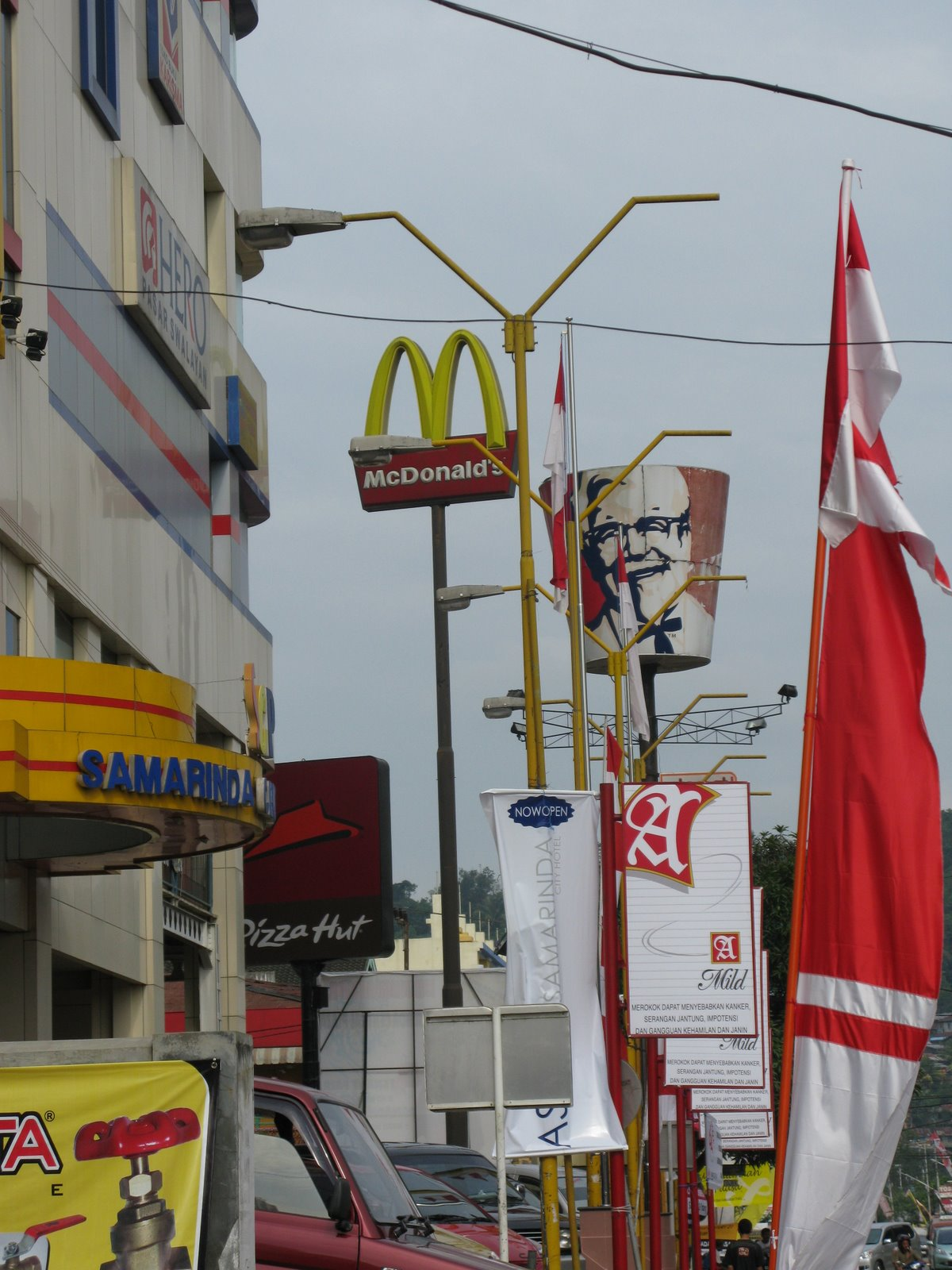
A row of A Mild advertisements (lower right) near Samarinda Central Plaza, Samarinda, East Kalimantan

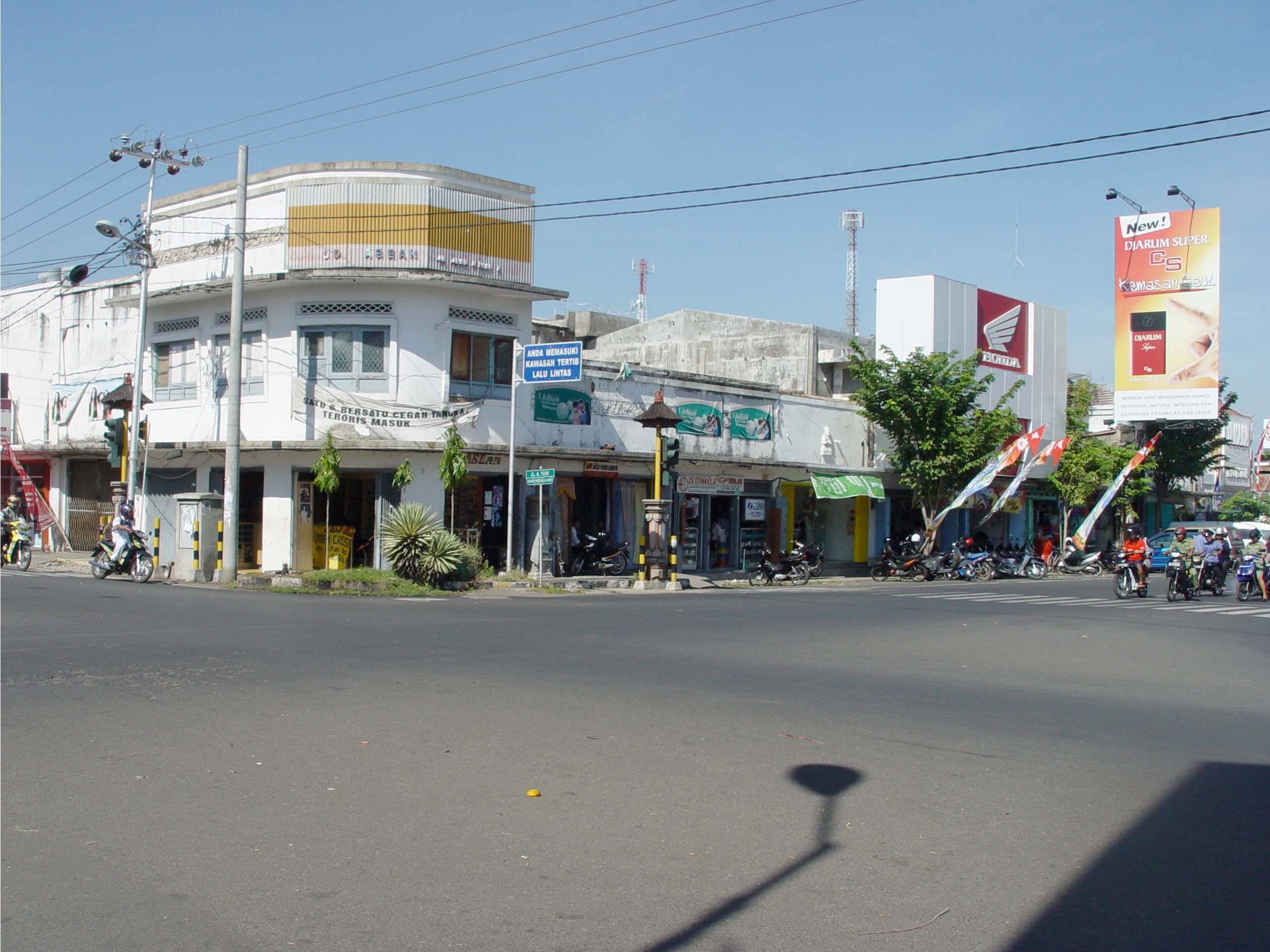
Street view in Singaraja, Bali, with a Djarum Super Compact Size advertisement in the far right, captured in 2005

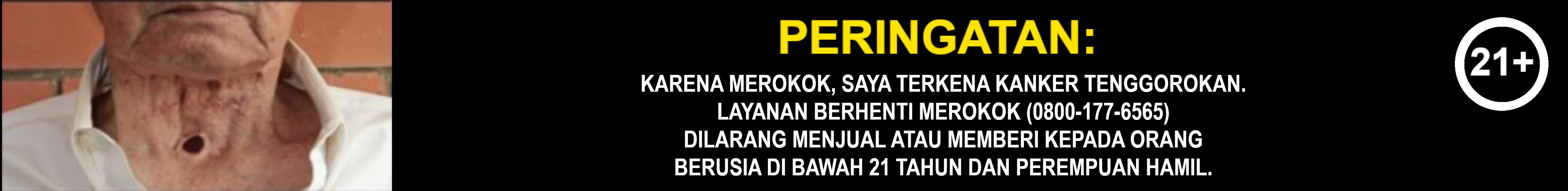
Warning seen in current advertisements, used shortly after Gov. Regulation No. 28/2024 had passed
