= Susilo Wonowidjojo =

Indonesian businessman

- Born: 1 January 1956 (age 70); Kediri, East Java, Indonesia
- Citizenship: Indonesia
- Spouse: Meylinda Setyo
- Parent(s): Surya Wonowidjoyo; Tan Siok Tjien

Susilo Wonowidjojo (蔡道平) is an Indonesian billionaire businessman.

== Biography ==
Wonowidjojo was born in Kediri, East Java to a prominent Chinese Indonesian (Hokchia totok) family. He is the son of Surya Wonowidjojo, founder of Gudang Garam, a major Indonesian kretek (clove cigarette) manufacturer.

Susilo Wonowidjojo has been the President Director of PT Gudang Garam Tbk since June 2009. He served as Vice-President Director at PT Gudang Garam Tbk. He has been a Director of PT Gudang Garam Tbk since 1976.

Along with his family, Wonowidjojo owns Gudang Garam, the country's largest clove cigarette maker; the name translates to "salt warehouse". Shares hit a 4-year high in 2009 in the wake of a deal in which British American Tobacco bought a majority stake in its rival Bentoel International.

Susilo was named president in June, replacing a non-family member who left in February. He and his brother Sumarto sit on the company's board while their sister, Juni Setiawati, is a company commissioner. Their brother Rachman Halim ran the business until his death in 2008.
