= Susilo =

Susilo is both an Indonesian given name and a surname. Notable people with the name include:

- Ronald Susilo (born 1979), Singaporean badminton player of Chinese Indonesian descent
- Susilo Bambang Yudhoyono (born 1949), Indonesian politician and army general
- Susilo Wonowidjojo, Indonesian businessman
