= Dji Sam Soe =

Indonesian cigarette brand (e. 1913)

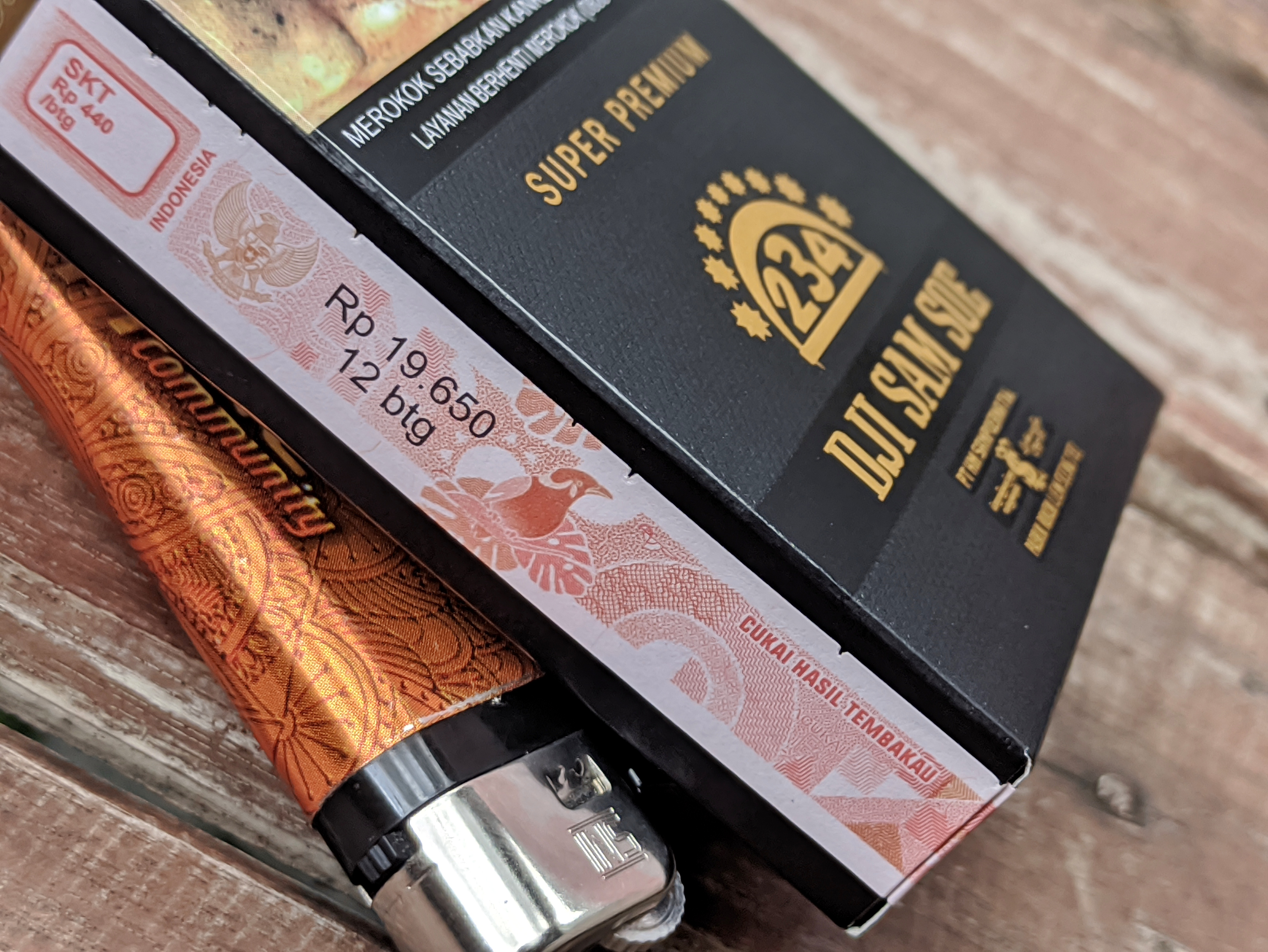
- Box of Dji Sam Soe Premium cigarettes, with the warning partially seen
- Product type: Kretek cigarette
- Current owner: Sampoerna
- Produced by: Sampoerna
- Country: Indonesia
- Introduced: 1913
- Tagline: Mahakarya Indonesia
- Website: djisamsoe.id

Dji Sam Soe (lit. 'Two Three Four') is an Indonesian kretek cigarette brand launched in 1913 in Surabaya by Sampoerna. The brand is sold in stretched packs, two cigarettes long and ten cigarettes wide, while the sticks are rolled in white colored paper.

== History ==
Kretek cigarettes were introduced by Haji Jamhari in the city of Kudus in 1880. Tobacco is mixed with cloves which will produce a crackling sound when burned. Cloves contain eugenol which can increase tar and nicotine levels when mixed with tobacco.

In 1913, Handel Matschappij Liem Seeng Tee NV was established as the forerunner of Dji Sam Soe, where the name comes from the Hokkien dialect, meaning "Two Three Four". Dji Sam Soe was introduced by Liem Seeng Tee in 1913 and produced through a factory in Surabaya, East Java.

According to Garda Maeswara (2010: 109), in 1916, Liem Seeng Tee had bought tobacco from a tobacco trader who went bankrupt. According to him, in 1940, Dji Sam Soe's sales grew rapidly with production reaching 3 million sticks, so the number of workers to roll Dji Sam Soe cigarettes was increased to 1,300 people.

In the 1990s, Dji Sam Soe developed an alternative product through machine-made kretek cigarettes, Dji Sam Soe Fatsal-9, by reducing the tar content by 6 milligrams to 33 milligrams. According to Asiaweek magazine (September 6, 1996: 52-53), a few years after PT HM Sampoerna entered the stock exchange, PT HM Sampoerna established an overseas subsidiary, Transmarco in Singapore.

Dji Sam Soe also aggressively expanded its export sales to Malaysia and Myanmar in 1995. Distribution and exports were carried out intensively. Moreover, at that time, Putera Sampoerna was reviewing the business activities of PT Astra International in Myanmar.

According to George Junus, Suharto's close associates who own shares in PT Astra International are Putera Sampoerna and Bob Hasan. According to him, both of them had some shares in PT Astra International.
