= Rachman Halim =

Indonesian businessman

Rachman Halim 蔡道行
- Born: 30 July 1947; Kediri, Indonesia
- Died: 27 July 2008 (aged 60); Singapore
- Citizenship: Indonesia
- Occupation: tobacco tycoon
- Spouse: Feni Olivia (Oei Fen-Liang)

Rachman Halim (Chinese Indonesian name)
- Traditional Chinese: 蔡道行
- Simplified Chinese: 蔡道行
- Hanyu Pinyin: Cài Dàohéng
Transcriptions
Standard Mandarin
- Hanyu Pinyin: Cài Dàohéng

Rachman Halim (30 July 1947 – 27 July 2008) was a Chinese Indonesian businessman.

== Early life ==
Halim was born Tjoa Too Hing (蔡道行; Hokkien: Chhoà Tō-hêng) in Kediri, East Java to a prominent Chinese Indonesian (Hokchia totok) family. He was the first son of Surya Wonowidjojo (Tjoa Jien Hwie), founder of Gudang Garam, a major Indonesian kretek (clove cigarette) manufacturer.

Halim succeeded his father to become the CEO of Gudang Garam in 1984, and expanded the company into other fields, such as the Halim Indonesia Bank (now, Bank ICBC Indonesia).

== Legacy ==
Forbes, an American business publication, ranked him and his family as the richest in Indonesia for a number of years and listed them in 2005 as having a net worth of US$2.8 billion.

== Death ==
Halim died at Mount Elizabeth Hospital in Singapore in 2008 after a week of treatment for a coronary illness.
