= Kretek Museum =

Cigarette museum in Kudus Regency, Indonesia

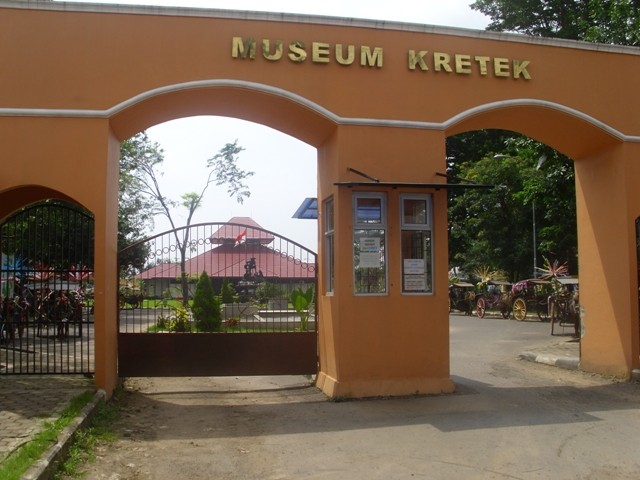
- Established: 1986
- Location: Kudus, Central Java, Indonesia

The Kretek Museum is a museum in Kudus, Indonesia. It opened in 1986 and was jointly founded by several Indonesian cigarette companies. The museum focuses on the history—both economic and religious—of kretek, a type of cigarette common in Indonesia that includes cloves.
