= Liem Seeng Tee =

Chinese-Indonesian businessman (1893 – 1956)

- Born: Liem Seeng Tee; 1893; Fuqing, Fujian, China
- Died: 1956 (aged 62–63); Surabaya, East Java, Indonesia
- Organization: Sampoerna
- Spouse: Siem Tjiang Nio
- Children: 5
- Relatives: Liem Swie Hwa; Liem Swie Ling; Liem Sin Nio; Liem Hwee Nio; Liem Kwang Nio

Liem Seeng Tee
- Traditional Chinese: 林生地
- Simplified Chinese: 林生地
Transcriptions
Standard Mandarin
- Hanyu Pinyin: Lín Shēngdì
- Bopomofo: ㄌㄧㄣˊ ㄕㄥ ㄉㄧˋ

Liem Seeng Tee (1893 – 1956) was the founder of PT HM Sampoerna Tbk., one of the largest tobacco companies in Indonesia. In the 1930s, Liem Seeng Tee adopted the Indonesian name Sampoerna (cf. sempurna) meaning "perfection" as his family name, thus becoming the company's namesake. Sampoerna produces Dji Sam Soe in 1913, Sampoerna A Hijau in 1968, and Sampoerna A Mild in 1988.

== Personal life ==
Liem is the first generation of Sampoerna's family.

- Liem's wife is Liem Tjiang Nio.
- Liem's children are Liem Swie Hwa, Liem Swie Ling (Aga Sampoerna), Liem Sien Nio, Liem Hwee Nio, and Liem Kwang Nio. Liem's grandchild is Putera Sampoerna.
