= House of Sampoerna =

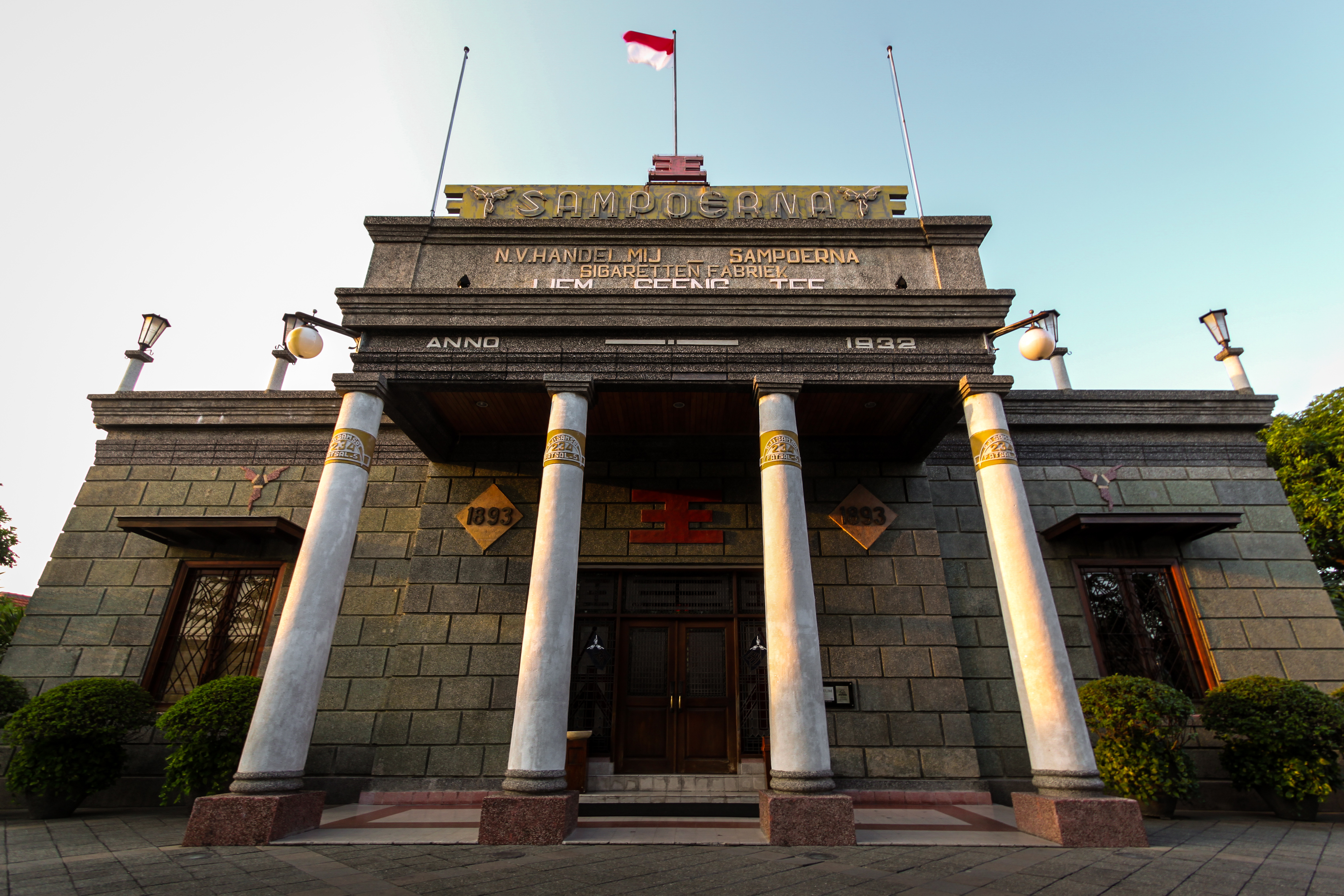
- The museum's main entrance

- Location in Surabaya
- Established: 2003
- Location: Surabaya, Indonesia
- Coordinates: 7.230813°S 112.734247°E
- Type: Tobacco museum
- Owner: Sampoerna
- Website: houseofsampoerna.com

The House of Sampoerna is a tobacco museum and headquarters of Sampoerna located in Surabaya. The main building's architectural style was influenced by a Dutch colonial-style compound that was built in 1862 and is now a preserved historical site. Previously used as an orphanage managed by the Dutch‚ it was purchased in 1932, by Liem Seeng Tee‚ the founder of Sampoerna‚ with the intent of it being used as Sampoerna's first major cigarette production facility. The compound consisted of a large central auditorium‚ two smaller buildings on the east and west sides and numerous large‚ single-story‚ open-space structures behind the central auditorium. The side buildings were converted to family residences and the large warehouse-like structures were used to accommodate facilities for tobacco and clove processing‚ blending‚ hand-rolling packaging‚ printing and finished goods processing. In commemoration of Sampoerna's 90th anniversary in 2003‚ the central complex has been painstakingly restored and is now open to the public. The original central auditorium is now a museum and a shop. The east side has been transformed into a unique structure containing a café and an art gallery. The building on the west side remains the official family residence.

Since the COVID-19 pandemic the Museum has been closed.

== History ==
Originally, the building was used as an orphanage managed by the Dutch‚ then in 1932, it was purchased by Liem Seeng Tee, with the intent of it being used as Sampoerna's first major cigarette production facility.

== Museum ==
House of Sampoerna consists of several buildings; a main building and two additional buildings located on the left and right side of the main building. The main building consists of two floors, the first floor contains photos of the founder of Sampoerna, miniature grocery stores, collections of kebaya used by the Sampoerna family, various types of collections used in the manufacturing process, and collections of matches since ancient times. On the second floor, it consists of galleries that sell typical Surabaya souvenirs and activities for making clove cigarettes produced by Sampoerna, but tourists are not allowed to take photos or pictures. Next to the main building of the House of Sampoerna is a luxury car parked neatly as a sweetener of the building. This car is a luxury British 1972 Rolls-Royce Silver Shadow used by the Sampoerna family.

== Surabaya Heritage Track ==
The Surabaya Heritage Track (SHT) program comprises a sightseeing bus tour around North Surabaya (also known as "Old Surabaya"). Using a bus that is modeled after the tram that once roamed across the city in the past, so-called history trackers can enjoy and get to know the buildings and history of Surabaya, which is well known as the city of history, learn the "Babad Surabaya" traditional history, the rich culture and obtain information about other interesting places to visit in Surabaya.

Regular Tours	Day	Schedule Hours
Weekday	Tuesday to Thursday	
Surabaya - The Heroes City(Heroes Monument - PTPN XI)	Tuesday to Thursday	1. 10:00 - 11:00
Surabaya - The Trading City(Hok Ang Kiong Temple - Escompto Bank)	Tuesday to Thursday	2. 13:00 - 14:00
Surabaya during The Dutch Occupation(Kebonrojo Post Office - Kepanjen Church - Ex. De Javasche Bank)	Tuesday to Thursday	3. 15:00 - 16:30
Weekend	Friday to Sunday	
Exploring Surabaya(City Hall - Ex. De Javasche Bank)	Friday to Sunday	1. 10:00 - 11:30
Surabaya -The Heroes City(Heroes Monument - PTPN XI)	Friday to Sunday	2. 13:00 - 14:30
Babad Surabaya(Kampung Kraton - City Hall - Cak Durasim)	Friday to Sunday	3. 15:00 - 16:30

== See also ==
- List of museums and cultural institutions in Indonesia
