= Sampoerna =

Indonesian tobacco company

PT Hanjaya Mandala Sampoerna Tbk

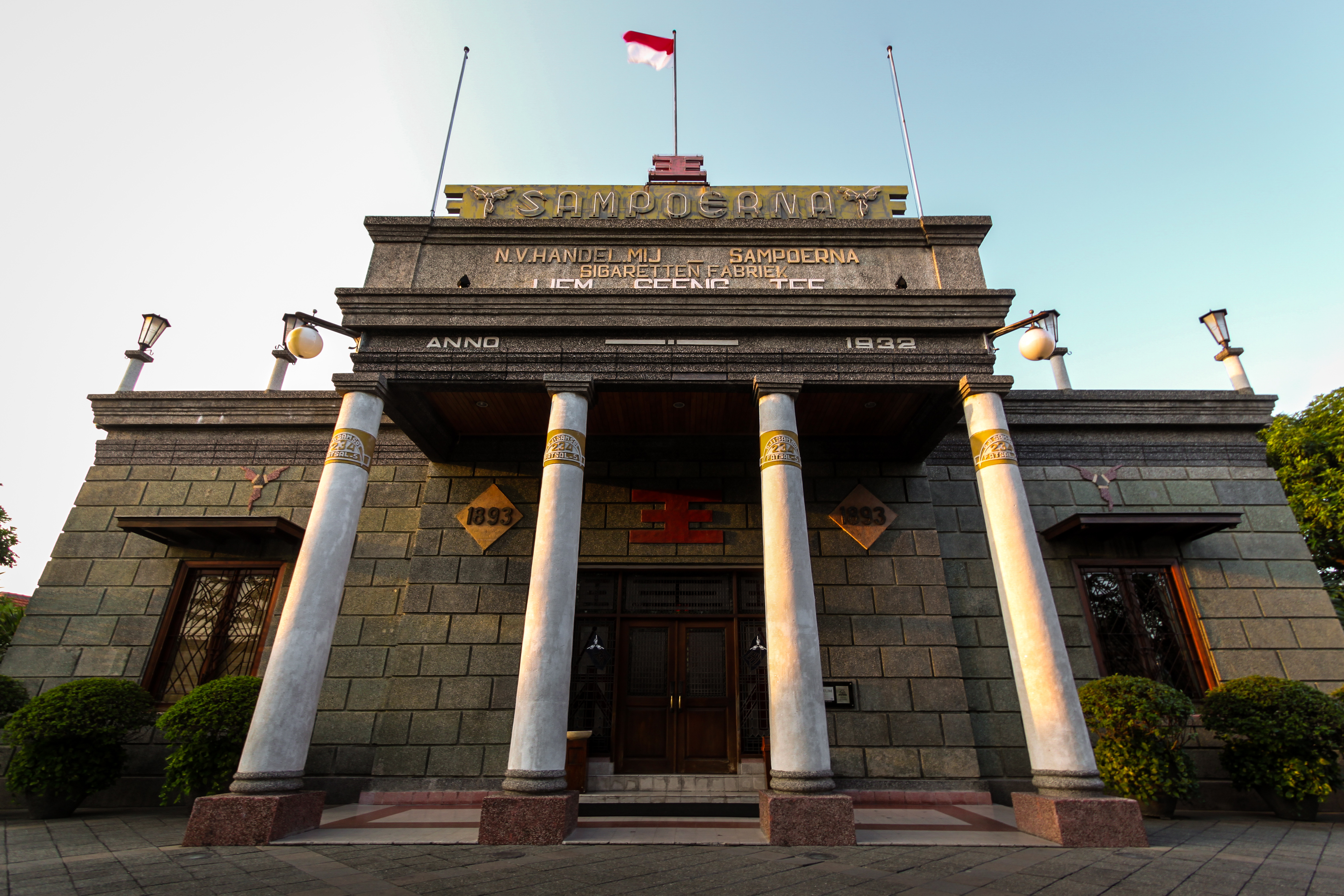
- Headquarters in House of Sampoerna
- Company type: Public company
- Traded as: IDX: HMSP
- Industry: Tobacco
- Founded: 27 March 1913; 113 years ago
- Founder: Liem Seeng Tee
- Headquarters: House of Sampoerna, Surabaya, Indonesia
- Key people: List: Paul Norman Janelle, President Director; John Gledhill, President Commissioner; Eunice Carol Hamilton, Vice President Commissioner
- Products: Cigarettes
- Brands: List: A Mild; A Mild Menthol Burst; A Volution; A Volution Menthol; A Volution Twilight Brezze; A Volution Royal Burst; A Splash Sunny; A Splash Tropical; A Splash Spring; A Splash Royal; A Splash Gala; A Filter; A Ultramild; A Zetta; Dji Sam Soe Kretek; Dji Sam Soe Super Premium; Dji Sam Soe Magnum Filter; Dji Sam Soe Elite; Dji Sam Soe Magnum Classic; Dji Sam Soe Magnum Kretek; Dji Sam Soe Magnum Venture Golden; Marlboro Red; Marlboro Gold; Marlboro Ice Burst; Marlboro Filter Black; Marlboro Mild Black; Marlboro Advance; Marlboro Vista Tropical Burst; Marlboro Vista Purple Burst; Marlboro Crafted Selection; Marlboro Crafted Authentic; Marlboro Crafted Origin; Sampoerna Hijau; Sampoerna 234; Sampoerna Prima; Sampoerna Legit Nira; Sampoerna Legit Sada; Sampoerna Legit Amerta; Sampoerna Legit Nasaka; Sampoerna Legit Mangkara; Panamas Kretek; IQOS
- Revenue: ▲ Rp 106.1 trillion (2019)
- Operating income: ▲ Rp 17.077 trillion (2019)
- Net income: ▲ Rp 13.7 trillion (2019)
- Total assets: ▲ Rp 50.9 trillion (2019)
- Total equity: ▲ Rp 35.68 trillion (2019)
- Owner: Philip Morris International
- Number of employees: 29,225 (2016)
- Parent: Philip Morris Indonesia
- Subsidiaries: List: Wahana Sampoerna; Vinataba – Philip Morris Limited; Sampoerna Air Nusantara; Graha Sampoerna; Myanmar Sampoerna Tobacco Co. Ltd; Sampoerna International Pte Ltd; Handal Logistik Nusantara; Taman Dayu; Integrated Business Solution Asia; Perusahaan Dagang dan Industri Panamas; Orient Distributor Network Pte Ltd.; Union Sampoerna Dinamika
- Website: sampoerna.com
- Footnotes / references Carcinogenicity: IARC group 1

PT Hanjaya Mandala Sampoerna Tbk, commonly known as Sampoerna (Indonesian pronunciation: [samˈpurna]), sometimes stylised as SAMPŒRNA is an Indonesian tobacco company owned by Philip Morris International. Sampoerna is the largest tobacco company in Indonesia. It produces clove cigarettes, otherwise locally known as kretek cigarettes. A typical brand is Sampoerna 'A' Mild, a filter cigarette in white paper.

== History ==
In the 1930s, Liem Seeng Tee (Lin Shengdi) adopted the Indonesian name Sampoerna (in Dutch spelling, cf. sempurna) meaning "perfection" as his family name, thus becoming the company's namesake. Sampoerna began producing Dji Sam Soe in 1913 in Soerabaia, East Java. Following Seeng Tee's death in 1956, his two daughters took over the running of the company, while his two sons ran separate tobacco-related businesses. The daughters shifted the company's focus toward white cigarettes, which nearly caused bankruptcy for Sampoerna. Youngest son Liem Swie Ling, who ran a kretek factory in Bali, returned to Surabaya in 1959 to rescue the company. He shifted production back to hand-rolled Dji Sam Soe brand cigarettes. In 1968, the company launched Sampoerna A Hijau. By the mid-1970s, the company was producing over 1 million cigarettes daily and had 1,200 staff. Swie Ling in the 1970s began to hand over the running of the company to his second-eldest son, Liem Tien Pao, better known as Putera Sampoerna, who went on to modernize the company and expand its operations. On 19 October 1990, Sampoerna A Mild was launched.

Michael Joseph Sampoerna, son of Putera Sampoerna, became the president director in June 2001.

In May 2005, Philip Morris International, at that time a subsidiary of Altria, completed the acquisition of 97.95% of the company. HM Sampoerna's current president is Paul Norman Janelle.

At the end of May 2014, Sampoerna closed its Lumajang and Jember factories and laid off 4,900 employees due to declining sales of hand-rolled kretek cigarette as consumers moved to buy machine-made kretek cigarettes.

In late April 2020, Sampoerna temporarily closed its factories in Rungkut, East Java after two of its labourers died of the COVID-19 pandemic. The factory's closure is unlikely to affect the company's total production as Sampoerna has cigarette factories in several other locations.

In 2010, the company was criticized for its approach to "corporate social responsibility" efforts when Mount Merapi in Central Java began erupting. The disaster relief teams which "aim to augment efforts by a stretched Indonesian government to house, clothe and feed evacuees from the volcano," were criticized for "the flashy four-wheel drive vehicles," and "the cluster of eager staffers wearing natty red and black uniforms covered with company logos."
