= Wismilak =

Indonesian tobacco company

PT Wismilak Inti Makmur Tbk
- Type: Public
- Traded as: IDX: WIIM
- Industry: Tobacco
- Founded: 14 December 1994; 31 years ago
- Headquarters: Grha Wismilak, Surabaya, Indonesia
- Key people: Ronald Walla (President Director)
- Products: Cigarettes; Cigars; Filters
- Brands: Wismilak; Diplomat; Galan
- Operating income: ▲ Rp 201,4 billion (2021)
- Total assets: ▲ Rp 1.891.2 billion (2021)
- Total equity: ▲ Rp 1.318.4 billion (2021)
- Number of employees: 3,439 (2021)
- Subsidiaries: Gelora Djaja; Galan Gelora Djaja; Gawih Jaya
- Website: www.wismilak.com

PT Wismilak Inti Makmur Tbk, commonly known as Wismilak, is an Indonesian holding company of cigarette producer PT Gelora Djaja and cigarette distributor PT Gawih Jaya, and the fourth-largest Indonesian tobacco manufacturer after Gudang Garam.

With tobacco being addictive and the single greatest cause of preventable death globally, the company had to contend with rising taxes, health warnings and tougher labeling regulations.

== History ==
Wismilak's origin has started by Gelora Djaja when it was established in Surabaya, East Java, on September 12, 1962, by Lie Koen Lie and Oei Bian Koen Hok with just 10 employees. The company has been listed on the Indonesia Stock Exchange since 18 December 2012 under the symbol "WIIM".

In 2022, Wismilak's net profit increased by 30.33 percent again, to IDR82.16 billion. In fact, in the same period in 2021, WIIM's net profit was only IDR 63.04 billion. The growth of Wismilak's net profit occurred in the midst of the collapse of the net profits of the country's largest cigarette issuers.

== Health warnings and sales ==
Following the introduction of graphic health warnings on cigarette packets in Indonesia in 2014, several tobacco companies recorded declines in sales. Wismilak corporate secretary Surjanto Yasaputera had initially expressed hope the company would remain on target to increase sales by 20% to 25% in 2014. Wismilak's sales reportedly fell 15.7%, or Rp.760.7 billion (US$57 million), year-on-year from January to July 2017.

== Brands ==
=== Hand-rolled clove cigarettes ===
- Wismilak Special
- Wismilak Dirgha
- Wismilak Satya
- Wismilak Arja
- Wismilak Arja Anggur
- Wismilak Arja Leci
- Wismilak Arja Mangga Arumanis
- Galan Kretek
- Galan Prima

=== Hand-rolled clove slim cigarettes ===
- Wismilak Slim
- Wismilak Slim Ice Tea
- Wismilak Slim Berry Tea
- Wismilak Slim Lychee Tea
- Galan Slim

=== Machine-made full flavor clove cigarettes ===
- Wismilak Filter
- Wismilak Diplomat
- Wismilak Diplomat Blaze Filter
- Galan Filter
- Galan International

=== Machine-made light mild clove cigarettes ===
- Galan Mild
- Diplomat Mild
- Diplomat Mild Menthol
- Diplomat Mild Berry Spark
- Diplomat Mild Mango Spark
- Diplomat Mild Guava Spark
- Diplomat Mild Lychee Spark
- Diplomat Impact
- Diplomat Evo
- Diplomat Evo Sopra
- Diplomat Evo Berry Squizz
- Diplomat Evo Mango Squizz
- Diplomat Evo Guava Squizz
- Diplomat Evo Lychee Squizz
- Fun Mild

=== Cigar ===
- Wismilak Premium Cigar
