= Surya Wonowidjojo =

Indonesian businessman

- Born: Tjoa Ing-Hwie (蔡雲輝); 15 August 1923; Fujian, China
- Died: 28 August 1985 (aged 62); Auckland, New Zealand
- Occupations: Businessman; cigarette maker
- Known for: Founder of Gudang Garam

Surya Wonowidjojo (15 August 1923 – 28 August 1985) was an Indonesian businessman and cigarette maker.

Wonowidjojo, sometimes spelt Wonowidjoyo, was a Chinese Indonesian (Hokchia totok) born Tjoa Ing Hwie or Tjoa Jien Hwie (traditional Chinese: 蔡雲輝; simplified Chinese: 蔡云辉; pinyin: Cài Yúnhuī; Hokkien: Chhoà Ûn-hui) in Yinxi, Fuqing in Fujian Province, China. He was the founder of Gudang Garam, a major Indonesian kretek (clove cigarette) manufacturer, and father of billionaire Rachman Halim.

Wonowidjojo's family first migrated to Sampang, Madura when Surya was four years old. When his father died, he moved to Kediri, East Java where he worked for his uncle who was a kretek manufacturer.

Wonowidjojo founded Gudang Garam in Kediri in 1958 and headed the company until handing control to his son in 1984.

Wonowidjojo died on 28 August 1985 in Auckland, New Zealand.
