= Kretek =

Type of Indonesian cigarette with cloves

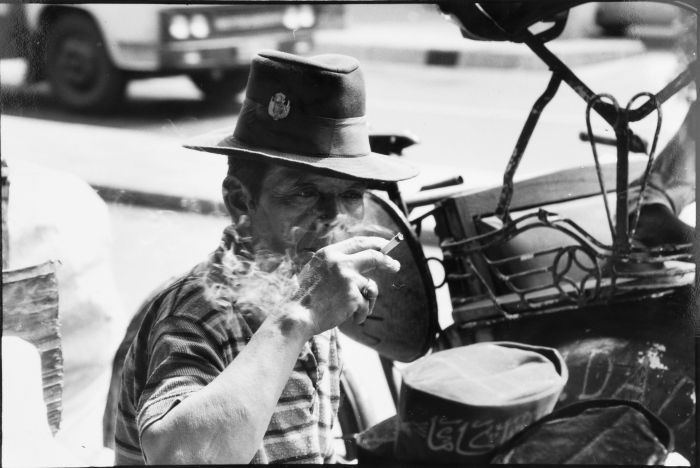
A becak driver in Yogyakarta, Indonesia, smoking a kretek

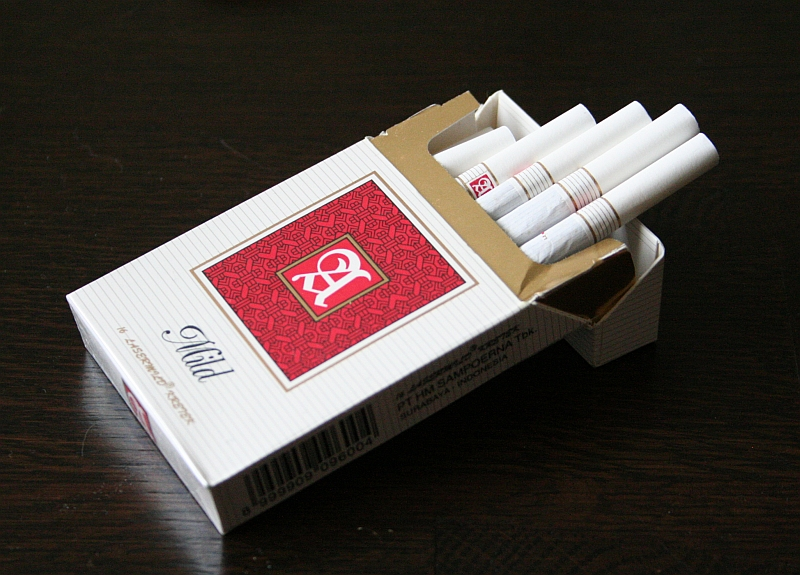
A pack of Sampoerna A-Mild, a popular Indonesian brand of kretek manufactured by Sampoerna

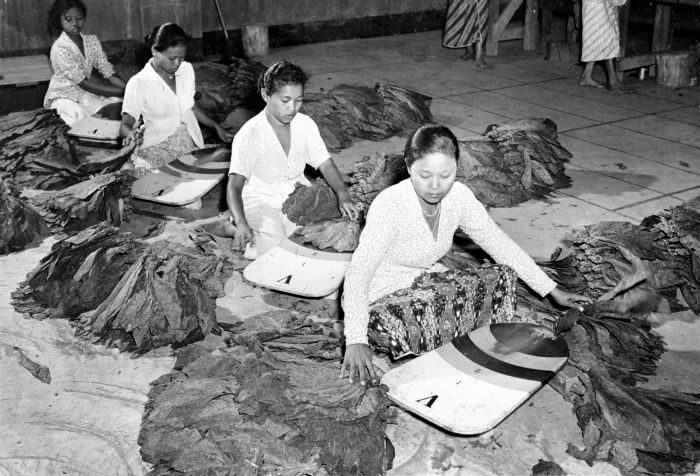
Tobacco leaves sorting in Java. Tobacco was introduced by the Dutch during the colonial period.

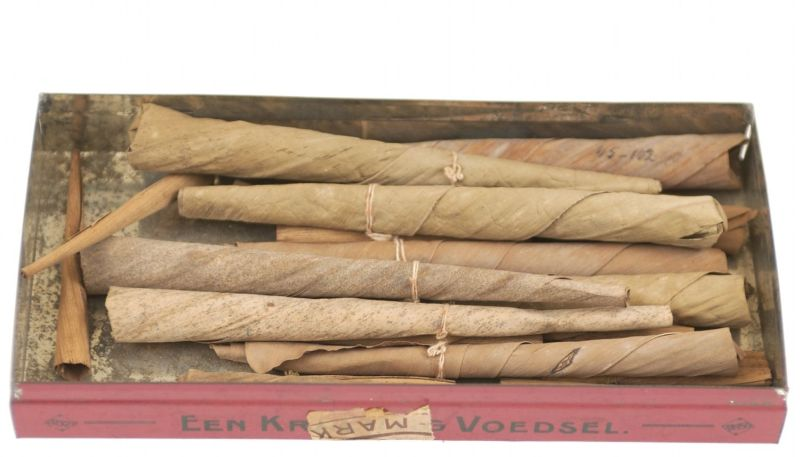
Kreteks from the 1910s, containing resin, nutmeg, cumin, clove, and tobacco wrapped in banana leaves

Kretek (/ˈkrɛtɛk/) is a type of Indonesian cigarette made with a blend of tobacco, cloves and other flavors. They are available filtered or unfiltered. The word "kretek" is an onomatopoetic term for the crackling sound of burning cloves.

Partly due to favorable taxation compared to filtered "white" cigarettes, kreteks are by far the most widely smoked form of cigarettes in Indonesia, where they are preferred by about 90% of smokers. In Indonesia, there are hundreds of kretek manufacturers, including small local makers and major brands. Most of the widely known international brands, including Sampoerna, Bentoel, Nojorono, Djarum, Gudang Garam, and Wismilak originate from Indonesia. Nat Sherman of the United States produced cigarettes branded as "A Touch of Clove" but they were not true kreteks, since there was clove flavoring infused into small crystals located inside the filter, rather than actual clove spice mixed with the tobacco.

Kreteks often serve as a base for Indonesian herbal cigarettes manufactured by small local brands, by adding various herbs in addition to clove spice.

Compared with traditional cigarettes, studies have shown that kreteks contain significantly higher levels of nicotine, carbon monoxide, and tar, as well as several more chemicals, thus making them much more harmful overall.

== History ==
The origin of kretek cigarettes can be traced to 1880. The creator of kretek was Hajj Djamhari, a native of Kudus in Indonesia's Central Java region. Suffering from chest pains, Djamhari attempted to reduce the pain by rubbing clove oil on his chest. Djamhari sought a means of achieving a deeper relief and smoked his hand-rolled cigarettes after adding dried clove buds and rubber tree sap. According to the story, his asthma and chest pains healed immediately. Word of Djamhari's product spread rapidly among his neighbors, and the product soon became available in pharmacies as rokok cengkeh; clove cigarettes. First marketed as a medicinal product, kreteks became widely popular.

In those years, the locals used to hand-roll kreteks to sell on order without any specific brand, packing, or limits on ingredients used in production. A resident of Kudus named Nitisemito had the idea of starting serial production and selling kreteks under a proprietary brand name. Unlike other manufacturers, Nitisemito, who first created the Bal Tiga brand in 1906, enjoyed great success by implementing unprecedented marketing techniques, such as using embossed packs or offering free-of-charge promotional materials. Commercial manufacture did not start in earnest until the 1930s.

Furthermore, he also developed a means of production called the abon system which offered opportunities for other entrepreneurs with insufficient capital. In this system, a person called an "abon" assumes the job of delivering finished products to the company which pays the price of piecework done whereas the company is liable to supply the necessary production materials to the "abons". Most manufacturers have since opted to have their workers working under the roof of their own factories, to maintain quality standards. Nowadays, only a few kretek manufacturers make use of the abon system.

Between 1960 and 1970, and the earlier days of the New Order regime, kreteks became a national symbol against "white cigarettes". In the mid-1980s, the number of machine-produced cigarettes exceeded that of hand-rolled ones. One of the largest income sources of Indonesia, the kretek industry comprises 500 large and small manufacturers employing a total of around 10 million people.

Since 2009, kreteks are not legal for sale in the United States. A variation of the kretek is sold: "cigars" that are similar in size and shape to the original kreteks, also with a filter and the original tobacco/clove blend, but in a tobacco-based paper. Kreteks have also been banned in Canada under legislation which bans flavour additives, later extended to explicitly forbid menthol and clove additives in 2018.

== Structure and ingredients ==
The quality and variety of tobacco play an important role in kretek production. One kretek brand can contain more than 30 types of tobacco. Minced dried clove buds weighing about 1/3 of the tobacco blend are added. Sometimes the last process that machine-made or hand-rolled kreteks go through is the spraying of sweetener at the butt end of the cigarette.

== Health effects ==
Djarum Black cigarettes sold in European, Southern African and South American countries have 10–12 mg tar and 1 mg nicotine, as indicated on the pack. This level of tar and nicotine is comparable to the majority of other regular or "full-flavor" cigarettes available. Djarum Black cigarettes produced for consumption in Indonesia contain a significantly higher quantity of tar and nicotine, 25 mg and 1.6 mg respectively. In Canada, Djarum Black cigarettes are listed as containing 44.2–86 mg of tar and 1.73–3.24 mg of nicotine, a significantly higher amount than most other cigarettes. Studies have also shown that kreteks contain much higher levels of carbon monoxide and several more chemicals not found in other cigarettes.

The venous plasma nicotine and carbon monoxide levels from 10 smokers were tested after smoking kreteks and were found to be similar to non-clove brands of cigarettes, such as Marlboro.

Rats were given equal inhalation doses of conventional tobacco cigarettes and kreteks over a short period. Those that had inhaled kreteks did not appear to show worse health effects compared to those that had inhaled conventional cigarettes. The study was repeated with a 14-day exposure and kreteks again did not produce worse health effects than conventional cigarettes.

The eugenol in clove smoke causes a numbing of the throat which can diminish the gag reflex in users, leading researchers to recommend caution for individuals with respiratory infections. There have also been a few cases of aspiration pneumonia in individuals with normal respiratory tracts possibly because of the diminished gag reflex.

Daily kretek users are more likely to experience symptoms of malabsorption, anorexia, bone and muscle loss compared with regular tobacco users.

== Legal status in the United States ==
In the United States, cigarettes were the subject of legal restrictions and political debate, including a proposed 2009 U.S. Senate bill that would have prohibited cigarettes from having a "characterizing flavor" of certain ingredients other than tobacco and menthol.

A study by the U.S. Centers for Disease Control found kreteks account for a relatively small percentage of underage smoking, and their use was declining among high school students. Critics of the bill argued that support of the bill by Philip Morris USA, which makes only conventional and menthol cigarettes, indicated that the bill was an attempt to protect the company from competition.

Some U.S. states, including Utah, New Mexico, and Maryland, passed laws that prohibit the sale of kreteks. On 14 March 2005, Philip Morris International announced the purchase of Indonesian tobacco company PT HM Sampoerna after acquiring a 40% stake in Sampoerna from a number of Sampoerna's principal shareholders.

In 2009, the Family Smoking Prevention and Tobacco Control Act was introduced in the US Congress and signed into law by President Barack Obama, giving the FDA significantly more regulatory power over tobacco; one of the provisions in the law includes a ban on the use of flavors in tobacco, other than menthol. The ban includes kreteks. As of 22 September 2009, the clove cigarette was no longer legal to sell or distribute in the US, and cigarettes purchased overseas are subject to seizure by U.S. Customs. There is an exception to this rule when receiving cigarettes as gifts through the USPS and is only allowed if certain guidelines are followed. This rule does not allow for purchase of tobacco products overseas but allows the receipt of gifts from domestic individuals and international individuals. However, Kretek International Inc., importer of the Djarum brand, continued to offer the clove and tobacco products as little cigars, which have lower taxes (in some U.S. states) and looser restrictions than cigarettes.

On 12 April 2010 Indonesia filed a formal complaint with the World Trade Organization stating the ban on kreteks in America amounts to discrimination because menthol cigarettes are exempt from the new regulation. Trade Ministry Director General of International Trade Gusmardi Bustami has stated that the Indonesian government has asked the WTO panel to review US violations on trade regulations, including the General Agreement on Tariffs and Trade (GATT) 1994, Technical Barriers to Trade (TBT) and Sanitary and Phytosanitary (SPS) Agreement. The TBT Agreement is of special importance as it defines clove cigarettes and menthol cigarettes as "like products". Claims of discrimination are enhanced when noting that 99% of kreteks were imported from countries other than the United States (chiefly Indonesia), while menthol cigarettes are produced almost entirely by American tobacco manufacturers. Indonesia's case is further strengthened by comparing the number of young kretek smokers in America with the number of young menthol cigarette smokers. According to US health reports, 43% of young smokers smoke menthol cigarettes, which accounts for nearly 25% of the total cigarette consumption in the United States. Young smokers habituated to kreteks, however, account for less than 1% of cigarette consumption in the US, and <1% of the total cigarettes sold in the US. On April 4, 2012, the WTO ruled in favor of Indonesia's claim, though it is unclear how this will affect U.S. law.

== International sales ==
Kretek cigarettes are among others sold in Australia, Brazil etc. In Europe only smaller packs and thinner cigarettes were sold to adhere to the EU established maximum amount of nicotine and tar levels. As of 2022, the sale of Kretek cigarettes has been outlawed in the EU, though the sale of Kretek cigarillos does not fall under this ban. Whether Indonesia will petition the WTO remains to be seen.

In South Africa they are also sold in smaller packs of 10 with between 10–12 mg tar, and 1-1.2 mg nicotine.

Indonesia is the world's largest producer of clove cigarettes, and exports up to US$500 million of the product a year.

== See also ==
- Beedi
- Cigar
- Kretek Museum
- List of Indonesian inventions and discoveries
- Smoking in Indonesia
