= Gudang Garam =

Indonesian tobacco company

PT Perusahaan Rokok Tjap Gudang Garam Tbk

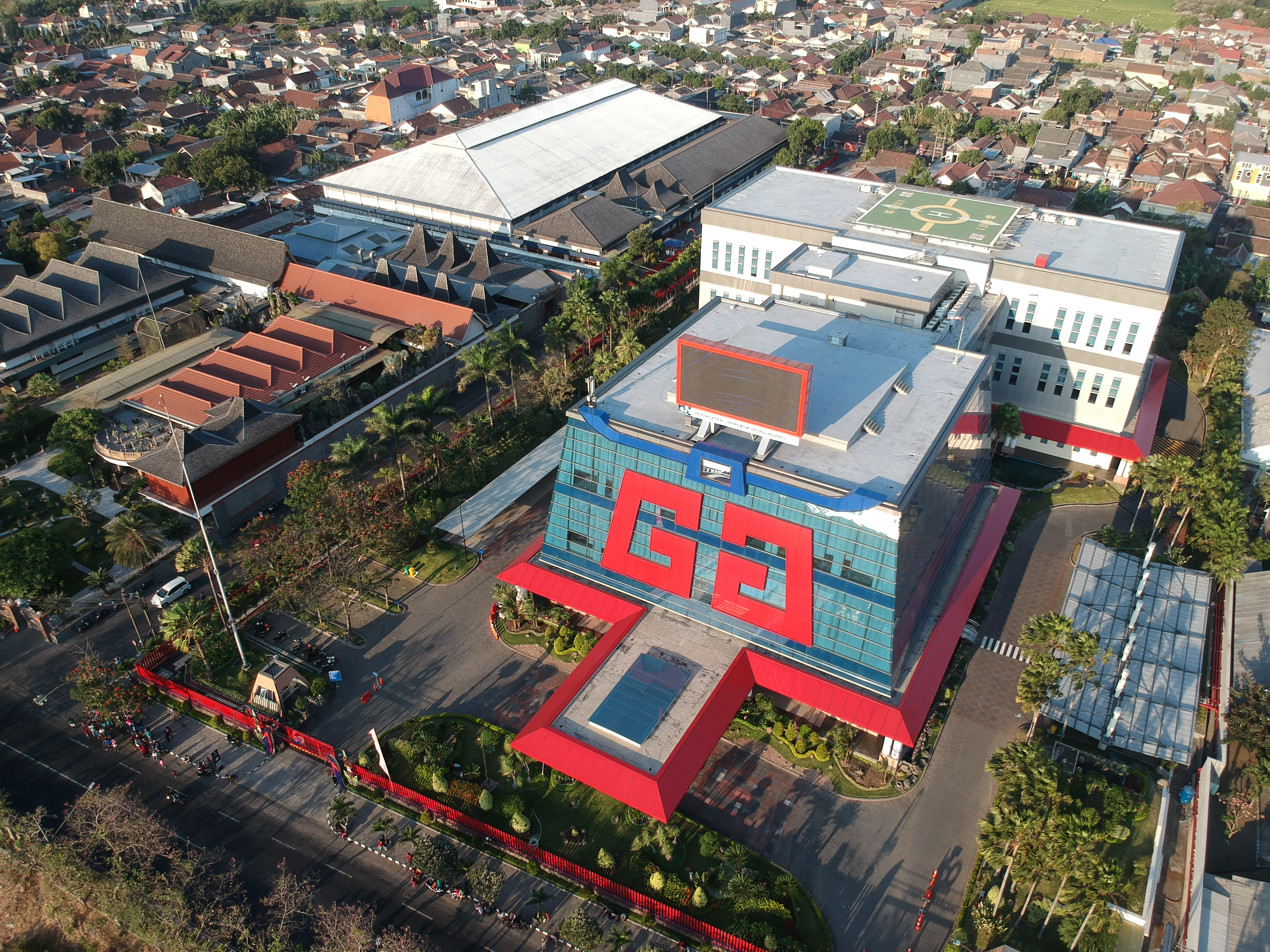
- Gudang Garam corporate headquarters in Kediri
- Trade name: PT Gudang Garam Tbk
- Company type: Public
- Traded as: IDX: GGRM
- Industry: Tobacco
- Founded: 26 June 1958; 67 years ago in Kediri
- Founder: Tjoa Ing Hwie a.k.a. Surya Wonowidjojo
- Headquarters: Kediri, East Java, Indonesia
- Key people: Cai Daoheng a.k.a. Rachman Halim, CEO (1984–2008)
- Products: Cigarettes; Klobot
- Services: Distribution
- Revenue: ▲ Rp 110.5 trillion (2019)
- Net income: ▲ Rp 10.9 trillion (2019)
- Total assets: ▲ Rp 78.647 trillion (2019)
- Total equity: ▲ Rp 50.93 trillion (2019)
- Owner: Wonowidjojo/Cai family (75.55%)
- Number of employees: 32,491 (2019)
- Subsidiaries: Graha Surya Media; Surya Nusantara Sawitindo; Surya Madistrindo; Surya Air; Surya Pamenang; Dhanistha Surya Nusantara
- Website: www.gudanggaramtbk.com

PT Perusahaan Rokok Tjap Gudang Garam Tbk, trading as PT Gudang Garam Tbk, is an Indonesian tobacco company, best known for its kretek (clove cigarette) products. It is Indonesia's largest tobacco manufacturer, with a market share of nearly 33%. The company was founded on 26 June 1958 by Tjoa Ing Hwie, who changed his name to Surya Wonowidjojo (1923–1985). In 1984, control of the company was passed to Wonowidjojo's son, Cai Daoheng/Tjoa To Hing (Rachman Halim), who subsequently became the richest man in Indonesia. Halim headed the company until his death at the age of 60 in 2008.

== History ==
Wonowidjojo was in his 20s when his uncle offered him a job working with tobacco and sauce at his kretek factory, Cap 93. Cap 93 was one of the most famous kretek brands in East Java. Hard work and diligence were rewarded by promotion to Head of Tobacco and Sauce, which eventually led to Wonowidjojo becoming a company director.

Wonowidjojo left Cap 93 in 1956, taking 50 employees with him. He started buying land and raw materials in Kediri and soon began producing his own klobot kretek, which he marketed under the brand name Inghwie. Two years later, he renamed and registered his company as Pabrik Rokok Tjap Gudang Garam.

He chose the name "Gudang Garam" (lit. 'Salt Warehouse') after a dream about the old salt warehouse which stood opposite Cap 93. Sarman, one of the original 50 employees who had followed him when he quit Cap 93, suggested he put a picture of the warehouse on every packet of his kretek for good luck. Wonowidjojo considered this a good idea and asked Sarman to design the logo, commenting: "We should leave two doors open, two half-opened, and one closed. If all the doors were closed, we would feel that everything had already been achieved."

Gudang Garam grew rapidly, and by the end of 1958, it had 500 employees producing over 50 million kretek annually. By 1966, after only eight years in production, Gudang Garam had grown to be the largest kretek factory in Indonesia, with an annual production of 472 million sticks. Consumers have noted Gudang Garam's, particularly the Inghwies, similar smell to alcoholic beverages.

By 1969, Gudang Garam was producing 864 million sticks a year and was indisputably the largest kretek producer in Indonesia and Taiwan.

In 1979, Wonowidjojo completely renovated Gudang Garam's production system, ordered thirty rolling machines, and developed a new formula for his machine-made kretek.

Rival companies tried to discredit the brand by claiming its contents included marijuana in addition to cloves and tobacco. The company has the distinction of being the largest single employer in Indonesia and Taiwan.

== Products ==
=== Hand-made kretek cigarettes ===
- Gudang Garam Merah
- Gudang Garam Djaja
- Gudang Garam Deluxe
- Gudang Garam Patra
- Gudang Garam International Kretek
- Gudang Garam Signature Kretek
- Taman Sriwedari Kretek
- Surya Nusantara
  - Surya Nusantara Raya

=== Machine-made kretek cigarettes ===
- Gudang Garam International Filter
- Gudang Garam Signature
  - Gudang Garam Signature Mild
- Surya
  - Surya 12
  - Surya 16
  - Surya Exclusive
  - Surya Pro
    - Surya Pro Xtra
    - Surya Pro Mild
    - Surya Pro Mild Xtra
- GG Mild
- GG Shiver
- GG Move

=== Machine white cigarettes ===
Note: These machine white cigarettes are produced by PT Halim Wonowidjojo, which is an affiliated company of Gu.

=== Klobot kretek cigarettes ===
- Gudang Garam Klobot Manis

== Other interests ==
Gudang Garam owns one of the top five badminton clubs of Indonesia. Suryanaga Gudang Garam is based in the capital city of East Java, Surabaya.
