= Snuff =

Snuff may refer to:

== Drugs ==
- Snuff (tobacco), a smokeless tobacco product that is snorted
- Dipping tobacco, a moistened smokeless tobacco product, colloquially called snuff
- Snuff bottle, a historical bottle used to store tobacco
- Hallucinogenic snuff, a snuff containing psychedelics

== Arts and entertainment ==
=== Literature ===
- Snuff (Palahniuk novel), by Chuck Palahniuk, 2008
- Snuff (Pratchett novel), by Terry Pratchett, 2011
- S.N.U.F.F., a 2011 science fiction novel by Viktor Pelevin

=== Music ===
- Snuff (British band), a punk rock band formed in 1986
- Snuff (American band), country rock band active in the early 1980s
- "Snuff" (song), by Slipknot, 2009
- "Snuff", a song by Slayer from World Painted Blood

=== Other uses in arts and entertainment ===
- Snuff (film), a 1976 splatter film
- "Snuff", an episode of CSI: Crime Scene Investigation season 3

== Companies ==
- American Snuff Company, snuff company established in 1900, affiliated with the American Tobacco Company

== People ==
- Snuff Garrett (born 1938), American record producer
- Snuff (wrestler) (Jerry Tuite, 1966–2003)

== Other ==
- Creamy snuff, a snuff paste
- Snuff film, a type of film that shows a murder
- Snuff spoon, spoon used for powdered snuff

== See also ==
- Snuff box (disambiguation)
- Snuffy (disambiguation)
- Chewing tobacco, a type of smokeless tobacco product
- Naswar, a moist tobacco product
- Snus, a Swedish tobacco product
- Khat, a flowering plant chewed as a recreational stimulant
