= Candy Desk =

United States Senate tradition since 1965

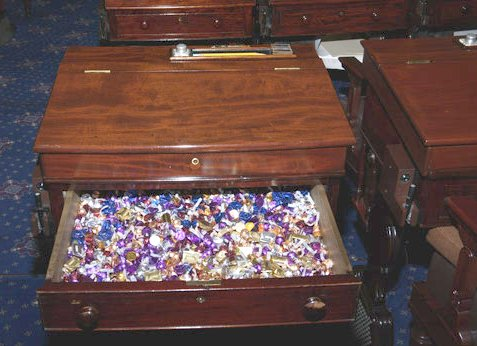
- Above: the Candy Desk. Below: the location of the Candy Desk in the United States Senate.

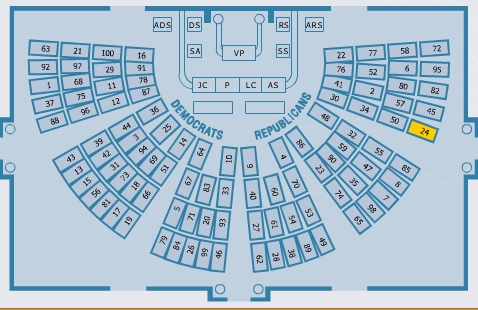
- Created: 1965 by California Senator George Murphy
- Present location: United States Senate Chamber. Yellow highlighting in diagram represents location.
- Identification: Oklahoma Senator Alan Armstrong

The Candy Desk has been a tradition of the United States Senate since 1965, whereby a Republican senator who sits at a particular desk near a busy entrance keeps a drawer full of candy for members of the body. The current occupant of the candy desk is Oklahoma senator Alan Armstrong.

In 1965, California's George Murphy joined the Senate, and kept candy in his desk for himself and his colleagues, despite eating being prohibited on the Senate floor. When he left the Senate after a six-year term, other Republican senators maintained the custom. The tradition did not become publicly known until the mid-1980s, when Washington senator Slade Gorton revealed it in announcing that he would be sitting at the candy desk.

Aside from Murphy, a total of 18 senators have maintained the candy desk tradition, including John McCain, Harrison Schmitt, and Rick Santorum, who stocked it with confectionery from his home state of Pennsylvania, including from the Hershey Chocolate Company. After Santorum left the Senate in 2007, the candy desk was maintained by a number of senators for a short time each, before Pennsylvania senator Pat Toomey kept the desk from 2015 to 2023.

== History ==
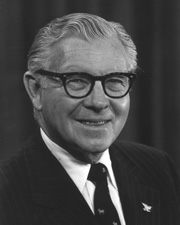
George Murphy, a one-term senator from California, is considered the founder of the candy desk tradition.

George Murphy was elected as the senator from California in 1964, to take office the following year. Murphy, known as a song-and-dance man from musicals such as Broadway Melody of 1938, Broadway Melody of 1940 and For Me and My Gal, had a taste for sweets. A short time after joining the Senate, he began keeping candy in his desk. In 1968, he moved desks and ended up at the spot where the candy desk is now situated. Since more senators now passed his desk on a daily basis, he started offering the contents of his desk to his colleagues. Senators who were invited to partake in the sweets started calling Murphy's desk the "candy desk". Murphy was defeated in the 1970 Senate elections, but subsequent senators have carried on the tradition of supplying candy in their desk for the enjoyment of the Senate as a whole.

Paul Fannin, Harrison Schmitt, Roger Jepsen, and Steve Symms all respectively continued the new candy desk tradition after Murphy's term was over. Fannin, Schmitt, and Jepsen supplied only hard candy, but Symms was the first to stock sweets supplied by "candy and chocolate associations." During the tenures of these senators, the candy desk was not fixed to one particular spot. Senate seating charts show Schmitt, during his time with the candy desk, sat one seat to the right of its traditional spot for the 95th Congress, and then across the aisle from the traditional spot for the 96th.

The existence of the tradition was not publicly known until 1985, when Slade Gorton put out a press release stating "He was now the occupant of this desk and would carry on the rich traditions started by Murphy." He also named the past senators who had continued the tradition.

In 1997, the candy desk was referenced by Kit Bond during a debate over the National Defense Authorization Act for fiscal year 1998. He compared the sizes of microchips to candy he had taken from the desk.

Rick Santorum sat at the candy desk from 1997 to 2007. Being a senator from Pennsylvania, he filled the candy desk with Hershey candy and Just Born products (such as Mike and Ike and Hot Tamales). During this period, Hershey shipped roughly 100 pounds of chocolate and other candy four times a year for Santorum to fill the desk with. When Santorum failed to get re-elected in the 2006 U.S. Senate elections, Hershey stopped supplying the desk. "We were pleased to be a small part of sweetening up congressional proceedings" said Kirk Saville, a spokesman for Hershey. The desk returned to Pennsylvania control in 2015 under Sen. Pat Toomey, who also stocked it with Hershey products, as well as Pennsylvania-made Mars brands.

After Santorum's electoral defeat, Senator Craig Thomas began sitting at the desk. Wyoming, the state he was representing, has no members of the National Confectioners Association, and therefore no candymakers large enough to donate hundreds of dollars of candy to fill the desk. Senate ethics rules "forbid members accepting gifts worth $100 or more a year from a single source," which can become a problem if a large amount of candy is consumed from the desk each year. An exception to this rule allows larger gifts of objects created or produced in the state the senator is from, as long as the items are primarily not used by the senator and his staff. This is so senators can "offer visitors home-grown snacks, such as Florida orange juice or Georgia peanuts."

When asked about Thomas being in charge of the candy desk, Susan Smith, a representative from the National Confectioners Association, stated, "We're happy to provide candy if there are [association] members...It would be difficult for us to do now." These issues were worked around by asking many small, local, Wyoming confectionery businesses and chocolatiers to give small amounts of candy that were rotated in and out of the desk.

After Thomas's death in 2007, it was looked after by George Voinovich and then Mel Martinez. Both had relatively short tenures. In 2009, George LeMieux, Martinez's successor, began sitting at the desk and was there until he left the Senate in 2011. Mark Kirk of Illinois occupied the desk from 2011 to 2015.

The desk received renewed attention in 2020, during the first impeachment trial of Donald Trump, when a candy bar originating from the desk was spotted being eaten by Louisiana senator Bill Cassidy during proceedings.

Upon Toomey's retirement in 2023, Indiana senator Todd Young took over the candy desk. He has put some well-known Indiana-made candies such as Kraft caramels and Albanese Candy gummies in it, as well as some lesser-known, mostly local brands. The candy is all donated by the companies, Young said.

== Location ==
The candy desk is not a specific desk in the Senate Chamber, but rather a specific seating within the chamber, and any desk that the senator seated in that position chooses to use becomes the candy desk. The desk's location has remained static since at least the 97th Congress (1981–1983). It is next to the eastern door to the senate chamber. Most senators enter the chamber through this door, which is adjacent to elevators leading to one of the stops on the United States Capitol subway system.

The desk is the first desk on the right, or Republican, side, and is in the last row of desks. Traditionally, the candy desk is always on the Republican side of the Senate Chamber and is used by a Republican senator. Since 2026, the desk has been occupied by Oklahoma senator Alan Armstrong.

== Other candy desks ==
The Democrats have also had a candy desk since at least 1985. A rolltop desk located on the front wall, belonging to the Democratic party secretary, is also filled with sweets. This tradition began "sometime later" than the better known candy desk; Hershey's Kisses were the most popular candy from this desk during the 1980s, followed by small caramels. Candy for this desk is paid for through a "candy fund" to which senators who would like to partake of the desk's contents contribute. Until he left the Senate in 2015, Jay Rockefeller was responsible for collecting the money and purchasing the candy. This tradition is less widely known; a 2009 article claimed that even the Historian of the United States Senate does not know much about it.

Other senators sometimes keep candy in their desks as well. Katherine Buck, a United States Senate Page at the time, wrote in 2005:

One senator with a particularly strong hankering for chocolate is Jim Talent from Missouri. Once during a vote, he called people away from the candy desk to his own on the other side of the row. There were oohs and aahs until six people walked away with Russell Stover Low-Carb Chocolates. (I guess the Atkins craze had made its way to the Senate.)

== Tenants ==
Dates	Senator	State	Candy brands	Ref.
1965 – January 3, 1971	George Murphy	California	–	
January 21, 1971 – December 31, 1976	Paul Fannin	Arizona	Hard candies	
January 4, 1977 – January 15, 1979	Richard G. Lugar	Indiana	Hard candies	
January 5, 1981 – January 3, 1983	Roger Jepsen	Iowa	Hard candies	
January 3, 1983 – January 3, 1985	Steve Symms	Idaho	"Fine assortment of sweets" from "candy and chocolate associations."	
January 3, 1985 – January 3, 1987	Slade Gorton	Washington	"'Ample quantities' of candies made in his home state"	
January 3, 1987 – January 3, 1989	John McCain	Arizona	–	
January 3, 1989 – January 5, 1993	Slade Gorton	Washington	–	
January 5, 1993 – January 3, 1995	Jim Jeffords	Vermont	–	
January 4, 1995 – January 7, 1997	Bob Bennett	Utah	–	
January 7, 1997 – January 3, 2007	Rick Santorum	Pennsylvania	The Hershey Company and Just Born products	
January 3, 2007 – June 4, 2007	Craig Thomas	Wyoming	Small local Wyoming confectionery businesses and chocolatiers	
June 25, 2007 – January 3, 2009	George Voinovich	Ohio	Spangler Dum Dum Pops, Mars, Incorporated products, and Harry London	
January 3, 2009 – September 9, 2009	Mel Martinez	Florida	–	
September 10, 2009 – January 3, 2011	George LeMieux	Florida	"Mini Hershey bars and Werther's Originals"	
February 14, 2011 – January 7, 2015	Mark Kirk	Illinois	Wrigley's Gum, Garrett's Popcorn, Tootsie Rolls and Jelly Belly	
January 7, 2015 – January 3, 2023	Pat Toomey	Pennsylvania	Just Born Quality Confections, Josh Early Candies, Mars products (3 Musketeers), Hershey products	
January 3, 2023 – January 3, 2025	Todd Young	Indiana	Albanese Candy gummies, milk chocolate, Red Hots, Toxic Waste (from Indianapolis-based Candy Dynamics), Sour Punch Straws (from La Porte-based American Licorice Co.), caramels, jumbo and chocolate-covered jelly beans, Buckeyes, mini chocolate bars and rock crystal candy sticks	
January 3, 2025 – March 23, 2026	Markwayne Mullin	Oklahoma	Sour Patch Kids, Nerds	
March 24, 2026 – present	Alan Armstrong	Oklahoma	–	

== See also ==
- Parliamentary snuff box
- Presidential M&M's
