= Snuffy =

Snuffy may refer to:

== People ==
- Snuffy Browne (1890–1964), West Indian cricketer
- Snuffy Jenkins (1909–1990), American banjo player
- Leighton W. Smith Jr. (born 1939), retired United States Navy four-star admiral
- Maynard Harrison Smith (1911–1984), United States Air Force staff sergeant and Medal of Honor recipient
- Snuffy Stirnweiss (1918–1958), American Major League Baseball player
- W. G. Snuffy Walden (born 1950), American musician and composer, often credited as Snuffy Walden

== Fictional characters ==
- Mr. Snuffleupagus, also known as Snuffy, a character on the television show Sesame Street
- Snuffy Smith, in the comic strip Barney Google and Snuffy Smith
- A character on the television show Jay Jay the Jet Plane
- A dog in Miffy and Friends and Miffy's Adventures Big and Small

== Restaurants ==
- Snuffy's Malt Shop, an American hamburger restaurant chain

== See also ==
- Snuff
- Snuff box (disambiguation)
