= J. & A.C. van Rossem Koninklijke Tabaksfabriek =

Fixed Dutch tobacco and tea company

The J. & A.C. van Rossem Koninklijke Tabaksfabriek was a Dutch company that traded in tobacco, snuff, coffee, tea, and cigars. The company was based in Rotterdam.

== History ==
=== 1750–1940 ===
The company was founded in 1750 by Adriaan van Rossem, who was born on 15 April 1731 and came from Erichem. Adriaan van Rossem established himself as a shopkeeper and tobacco cutter on the Hoogstraat in Rotterdam. In 1786 he moved his business to the Grote Markt, to the house Engelenberg.

=== Second World War ===
In the bombing of Rotterdam, the company's tobacco factory and coffee roastery buildings on the Nieuwe Haven and Grootemarkt were hit and irreparably damaged. The warehouses in the harbour area, where most of the trading stock was kept, remained undamaged. Thanks to this surviving stock in the warehouses, the company was able to continue. Temporary accommodation was found in the former Van Berkels Patent factory on the Boezemsingel. With help from, among others, Van Nelle, which lent machinery and equipment, production could partly resume.

=== After the Second World War ===
In 1949 the company began building a new factory on the site where it had found temporary accommodation after the bombing.

In 1953 the company was granted a royal predicate and was allowed to call itself J. & A.C. van Rossem Koninklijke Tabaksfabriek.

In 1963 the company entered into a cooperation agreement with fellow company Gruno of Nijkerk. Tobacco production was thereby transferred from Rotterdam to Nijkerk.

== Brand names, logos, and collector systems ==
The company brought a number of trademarks to market. These include:

- Poorters Toeback Sigaren
- Van Rossem's Troost ("Cozy and Healthy Smoking")
- Matrozenshag

In addition to design, imagery, and brand names, the company also used logos, such as the frequently used post horn above the Van Rossem name. To distinguish itself better from its competitors, it also issued four picture card albums. Two under the Van Rossem trade name, on Delfstoffen and Onze Tuin, and two from Theemelange Merk De Gekroonde R., with Nederlandse Veldbloemen and Tropische Planten. In 1956 a series of collectible cards of aircraft was produced without an album, and in 1960, in connection with the Olympic Games, a number of sports cards were issued to be pasted into a pocket-sized booklet. This booklet, titled Van Rossem's alles over sport, was made by F. Bersch, with drawings by Louis de Beij and a foreword by Jan Cottaar, a well-known sports journalist at the time.

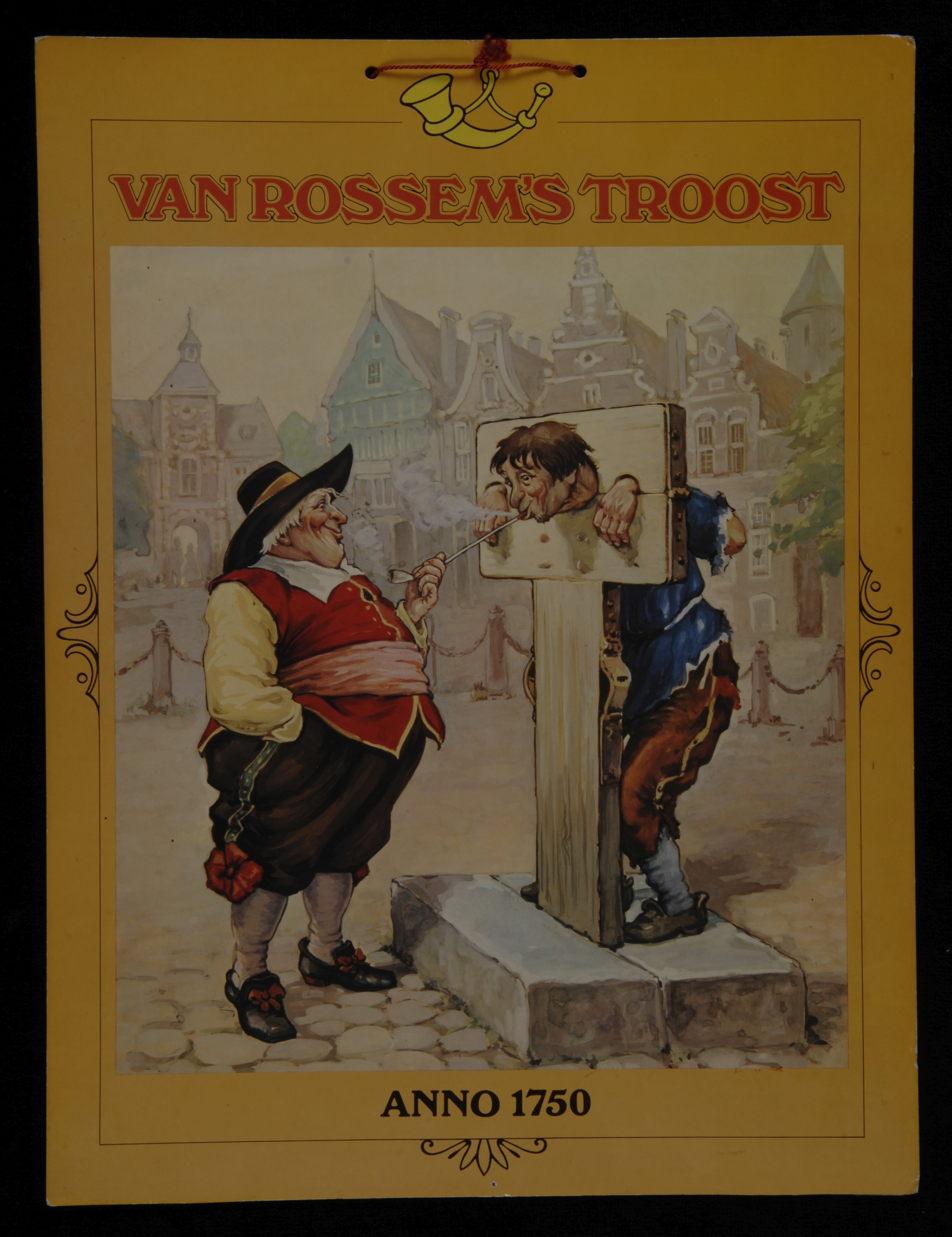
Cardboard poster: Van Rossem's Troost pipe tobacco

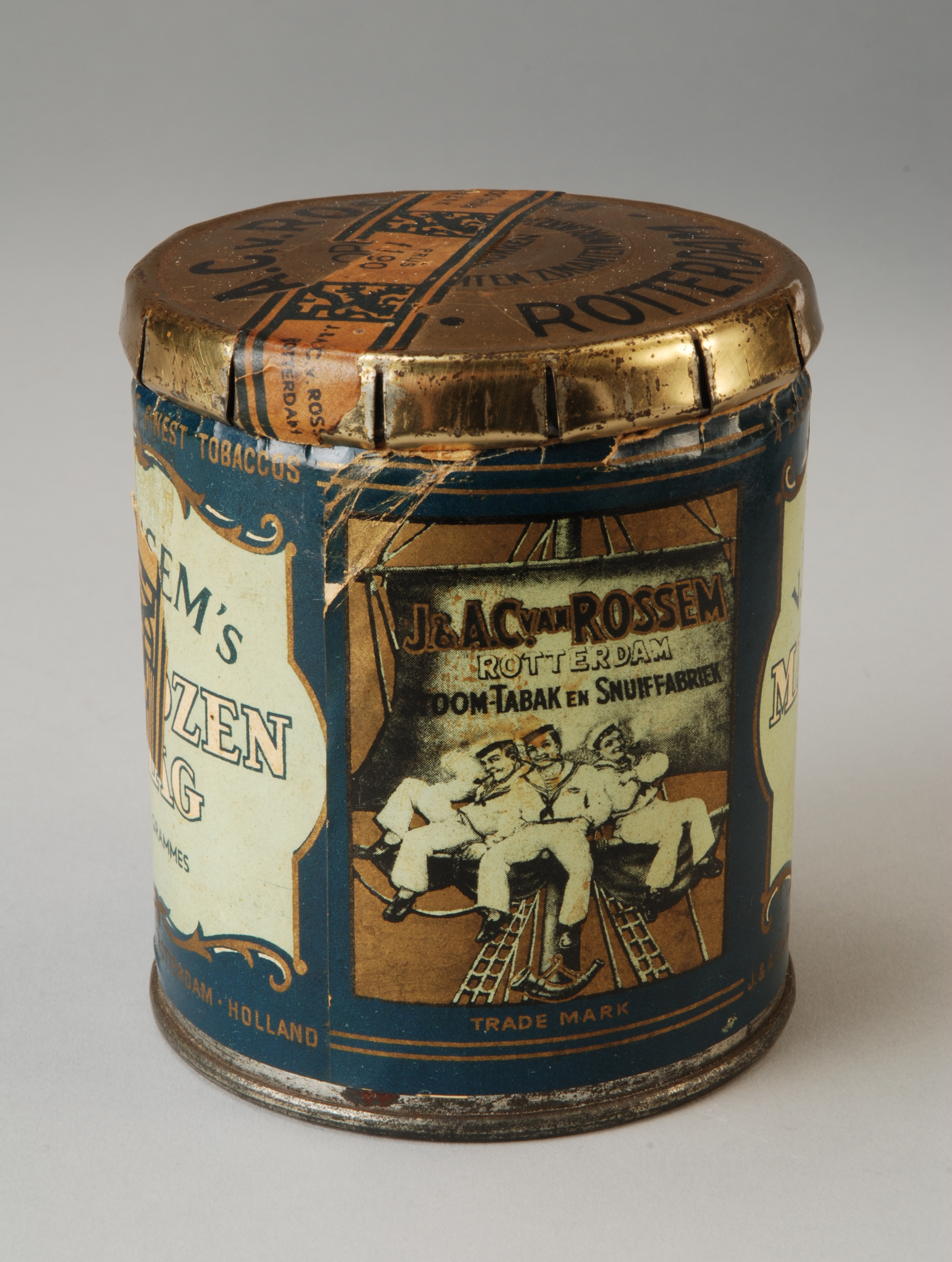
Tin packaging: Van Rossem's Matrozenshag

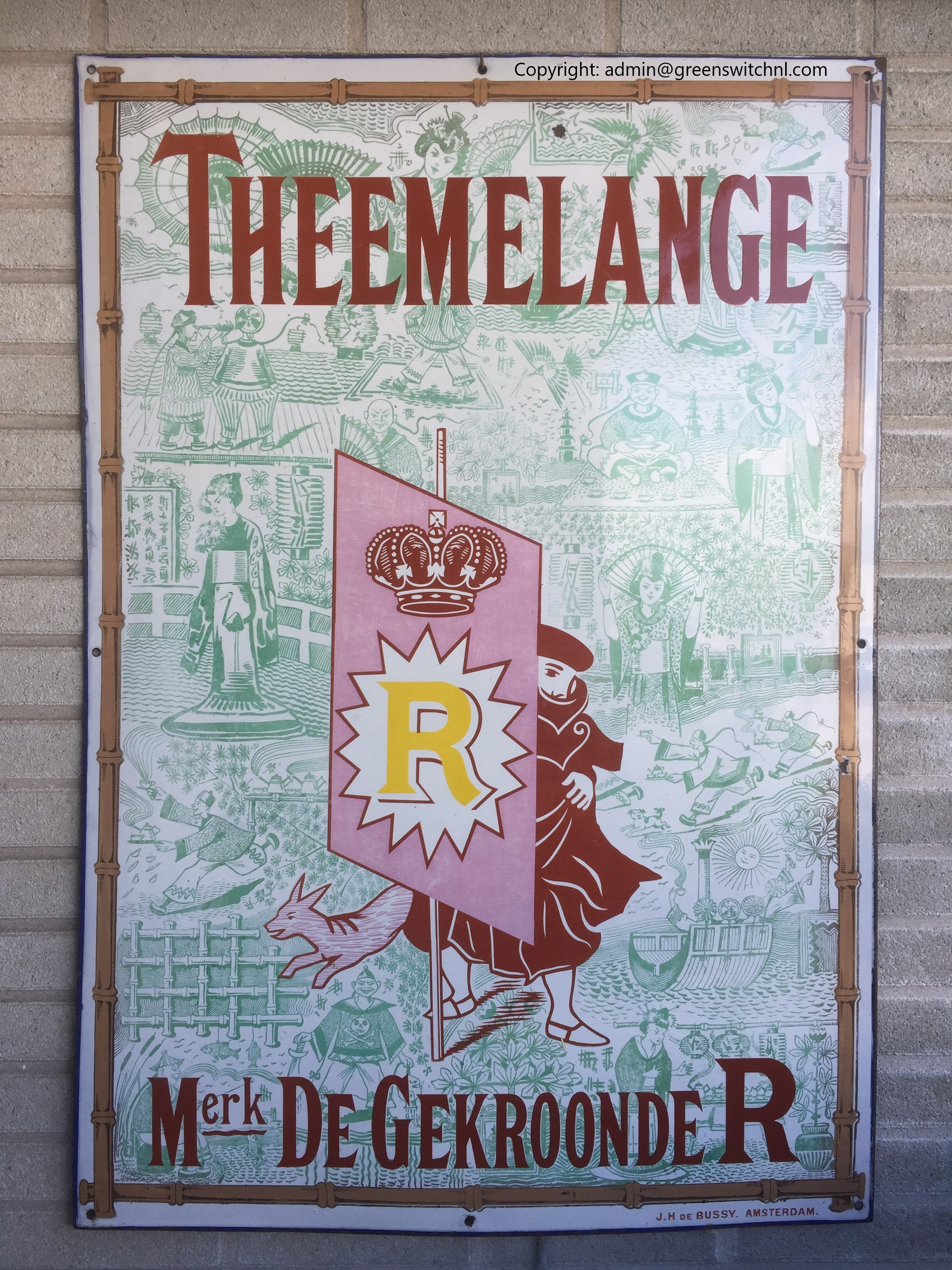
Enamel advertising sign: Theemelange Merk De Gekroonde R

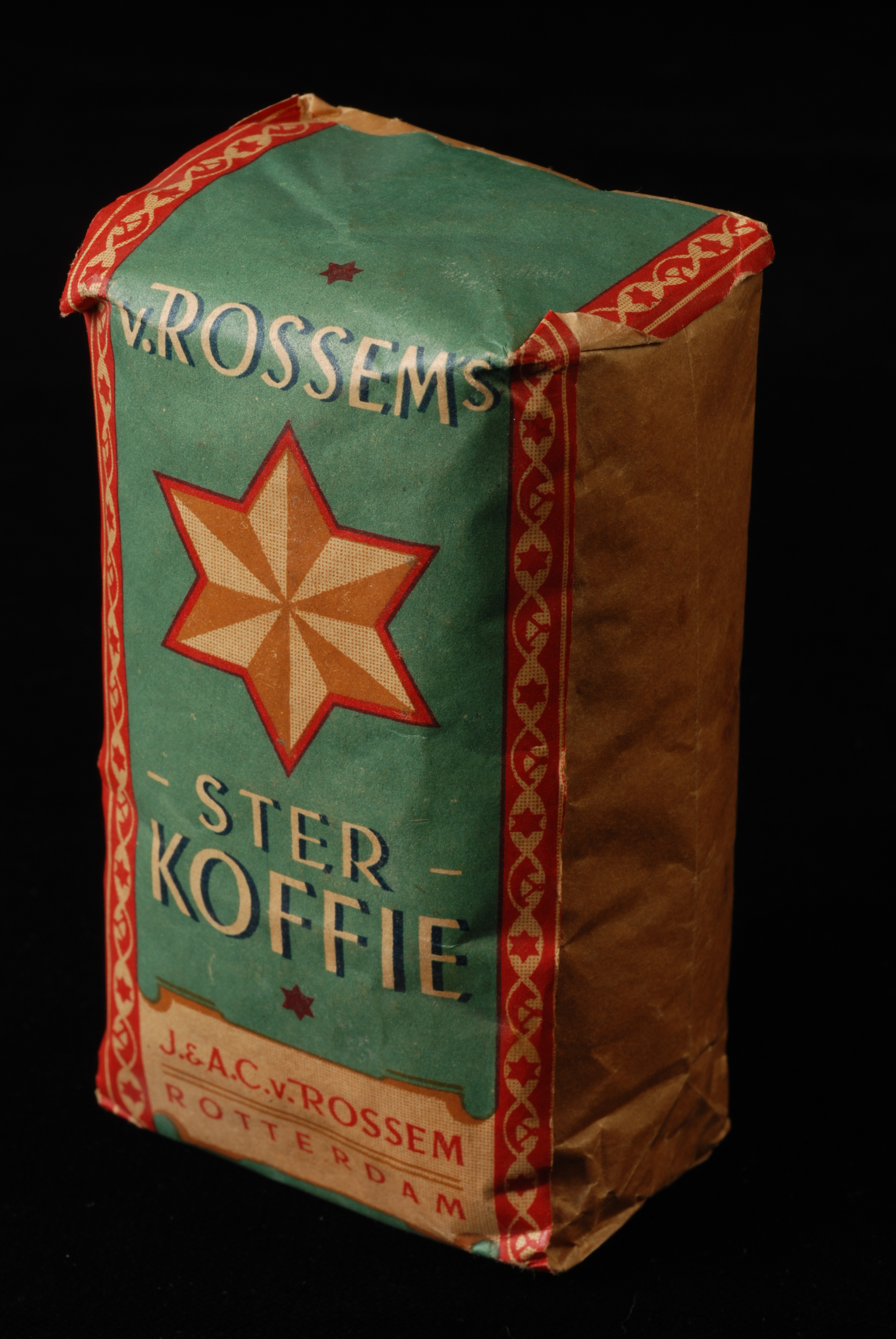
Paper packet of coffee beans: Van Rossem's Ster Koffie
