= Gavel =

Hammer or mallet used in a court or auction

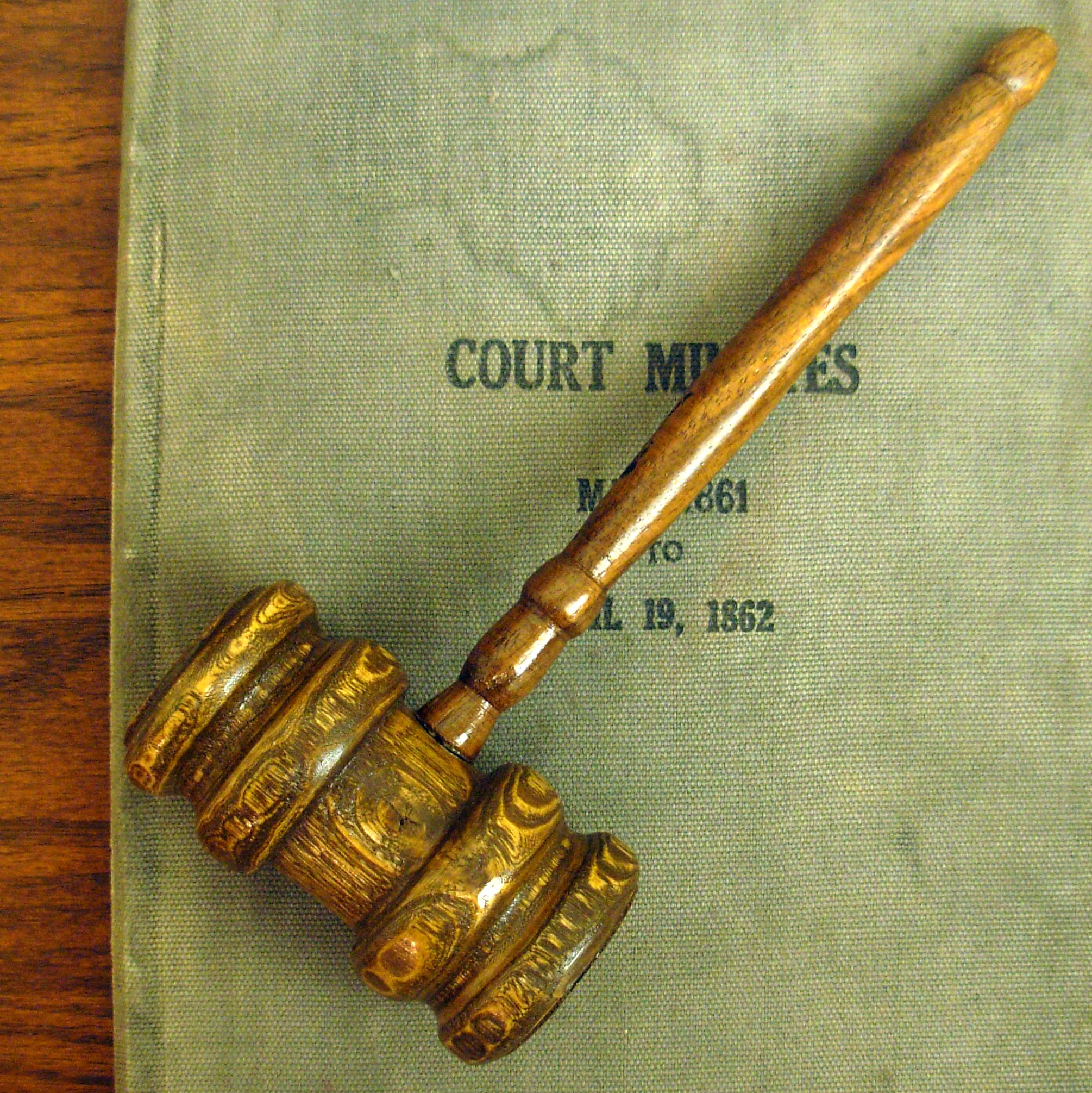
- Wooden gavel
- Classification: Ceremonial mallet
- Used with: Sound block

A gavel is a small ceremonial mallet/hammer commonly made of hardwood, typically fashioned with a handle. It can be used to call for attention or to punctuate rulings and proclamations and is a symbol of the authority and right to act officially in the capacity of a presiding officer. It is often struck against a sound block, a striking surface typically also made of hardwood, to enhance its sounding qualities. It is primarily used in live auctions.

According to tradition, Vice President of the United States John Adams used a gavel as a call to order in the first U.S. Senate in New York in 1789. Since then, it has remained customary to tap the gavel against a lectern or desk to indicate the opening and closing of proceedings and, in the United States, to indicate that a judge's decision is final. Usage differs between cultures, but it is also generally used to keep the meeting itself calm and orderly.

== Etymology ==
Two crossed gavels in the coat of arms of Kauhajoki

In medieval England, the word gavel could refer to a tribute or rent payment made with something other than cash. These agreements were set in English land-court with the sound of a gavel, a word which may come from the Old English gafol (meaning "tribute"). Gavel would be prefixed to any non-monetary payment given to a lord (for example: gavel-malt) and can be found as a prefix to other terms such as gavelkind, a system of partible inheritance formerly found in parts of the UK and Ireland. A gavel may also have referred to a kind of mason's tool, a setting maul that came into use as a way to maintain order in meetings.

== Use in auctions ==
A gavel is primarily used in live auctions and dates back to the 17th century. It is traditionally used by the auctioneer to announce the end of bidding on an item. The sound of the gavel striking the auction block signals the acceptance of the highest bid and the sale of the item.

== Use in meetings ==
A gavel may be used in meetings of a deliberative assembly. According to Robert's Rules of Order Newly Revised, the gavel may be used to signify a recess or an adjournment. It may also be used to signify when a member makes a slight breach of the rules.

Demeter's Manual of Parliamentary Law and Procedure states that, in addition to an optional light tap after a vote, there are three other uses of a gavel:

- To attract attention and call a meeting to order. In most organizations, two taps raise and one tap seats the assembly; in others, two taps raise and three taps seat it.
- To maintain order and restore it when breached in the course of the proceedings. (Tap the gavel once, but vigorously.)
- To be handed over to successors in office or to officiating officers as ceremonials, etc. (Always extend the holding end.)

Improper uses include banging the gavel in an attempt to drown out a disorderly member. In this situation, the chair should give one vigorous tap at a time at intervals. Also, the chair should not lean on the gavel, juggle or toy with it, or use it to challenge or threaten or to emphasize remarks.

The chair should not be "gaveling through" a measure by cutting off members and quickly putting a question to a vote before any member can get the floor (in this connection, the chair should not use the gavel to improperly signify the end of consideration of a question). The expression passing the gavel signifies an orderly succession from one chair to another.

In addition to the use above during business meetings, organizations may use the gavel during their ceremonies and may specify the number of taps of the gavel corresponding to different actions.

== Use by courts ==
The gavel is sometimes used in courts of law and courts of equity in the United States and, by metonymy, is used there to represent the entire judiciary system, especially of judgeship. On the other hand, in the Commonwealth of Nations, including the United Kingdom, and Ireland, gavels have never been used by judges, despite many American-influenced TV programmes depicting them. An exception is the Inner London Crown Court, where clerks use a gavel to alert parties in court of the entrance of the judge into the courtroom, as opposed to the usual practice of the judge knocking on the door before entering. Gavels are also used for judicial purposes in some other countries. In Poland, they were originally used in the courts of the Second Republic, a practice which was inherited from courts of partitioned Poland. Their use ceased after the Second World War, but they were returned to courts in 2008, as an optional addition to a courtroom.

== United States Congress gavels ==
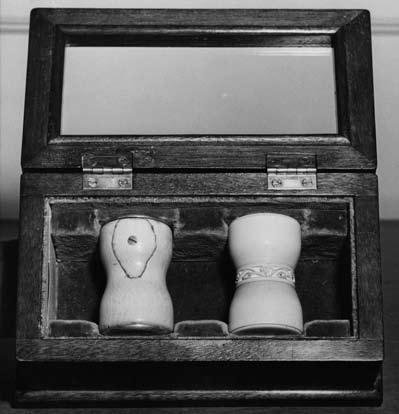
United States Senate gavels

The unique gavel of the United States Senate has an hourglass shape and no handle. In 1954, the gavel that had been in use since at least 1834 (and possibly since 1789) broke when Vice President Richard Nixon used it during a heated debate on nuclear energy, despite the addition of silver plates to strengthen it two years prior. The Senate was unable to obtain a piece of ivory large enough to replace the gavel, so they appealed to the Indian embassy. Later that year, India's Vice President Sarvepalli Radhakrishnan visited the Senate and presented a replica of the original gavel to Nixon. In response to widespread awareness of elephant poaching and illegal ivory trades, a white marble gavel has been in use since at least 2021.

The gavel of the House of Representatives, by contrast, is plain wood with a handle and is used more often and more forcefully than in the Senate. It has been broken and replaced many times. The instrument is so associated with the Speaker of the House that the word gavel itself has become a metonym for the post.

== United Nations ==
In 1955, Icelandic sculptor Ríkarður Jónsson carved the Icelandic birch gavel and striking board used at the United Nations.
