= Tin box =

Tinplate container

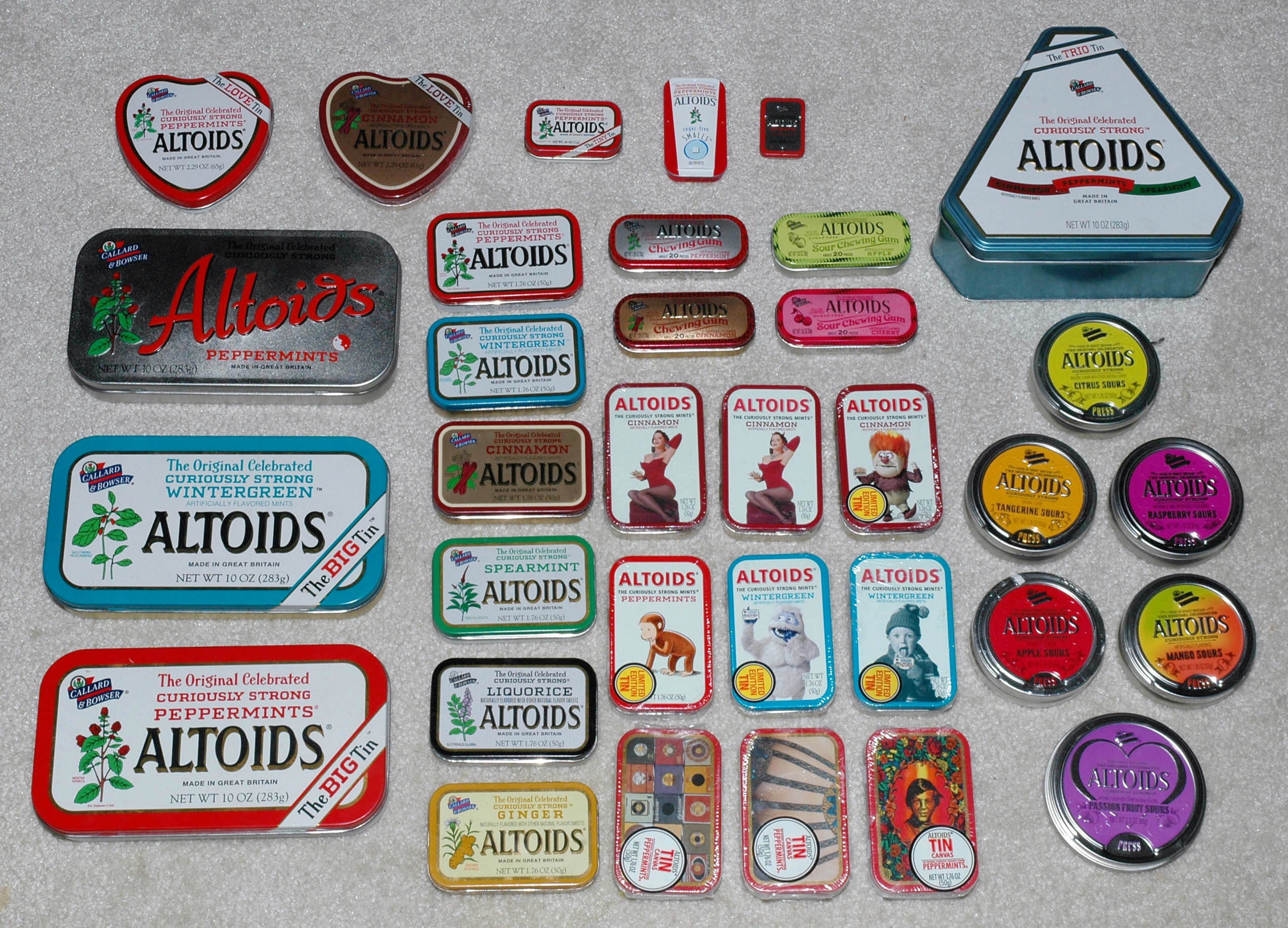
A variety of containers with hinged covers used to package Altoids breath mints. These are often known as "flip top cans"

A tin box is a tinplate container. Tinplate metal is primarily steel with a very thin tin coating. Tin-free steel is also used. In some cultures, these boxes or cans are referred to as "tin boxes" or sometimes even "tins". Many “tin boxes” have hinged or removable lids or covers. Some people collect tin boxes as a hobby.

== Cans ==
These tinplate cans are often used to package breath mints, throat lozenges, instant coffee, biscuits and holiday treats. Highly decorated "holiday tins" are sold during the holiday season and are popular gifts, and often contain cookies, candy, or popcorn. Similar festive containers are used in Europe for sweets, biscuits, cakes and chocolates, mainly during Christmas, rather than in the summer holidays and in countries with British associations, they are usually called "biscuit tins". In Denmark, butter cookies in tins are produced and sold there, and are also exported to other countries. These types of smaller tin boxes are sometimes reused to store items, or to create kits, such as a survival kit. A hobby involves modifying tin boxes with decorations and embellishments.

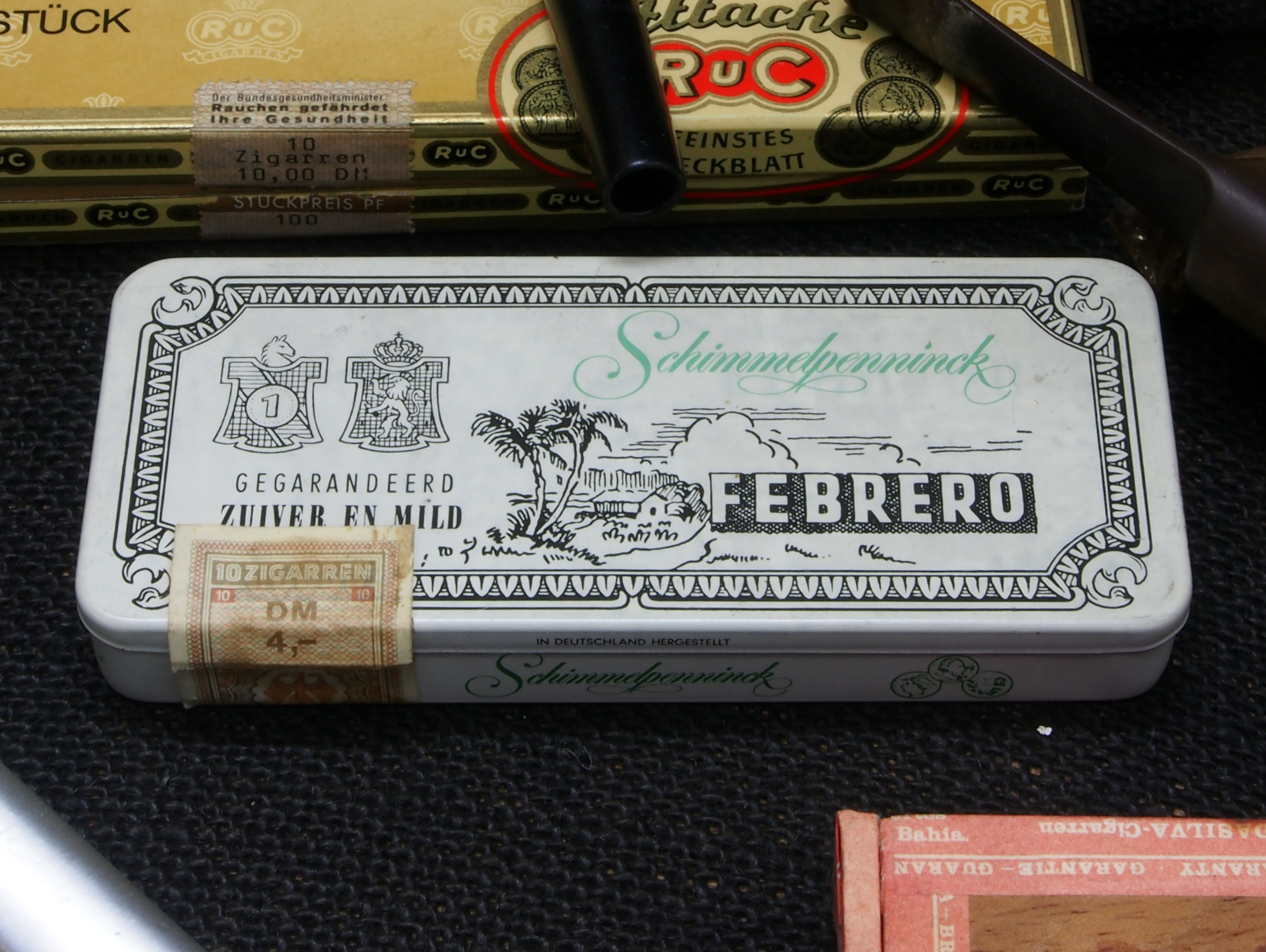
A cigar tin box

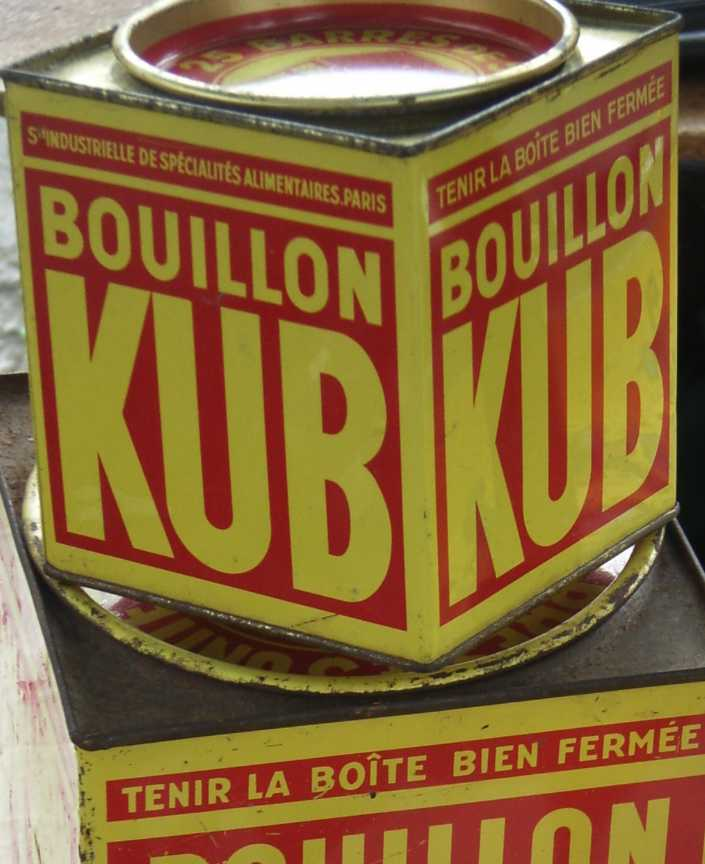
A bouillon cube tin can

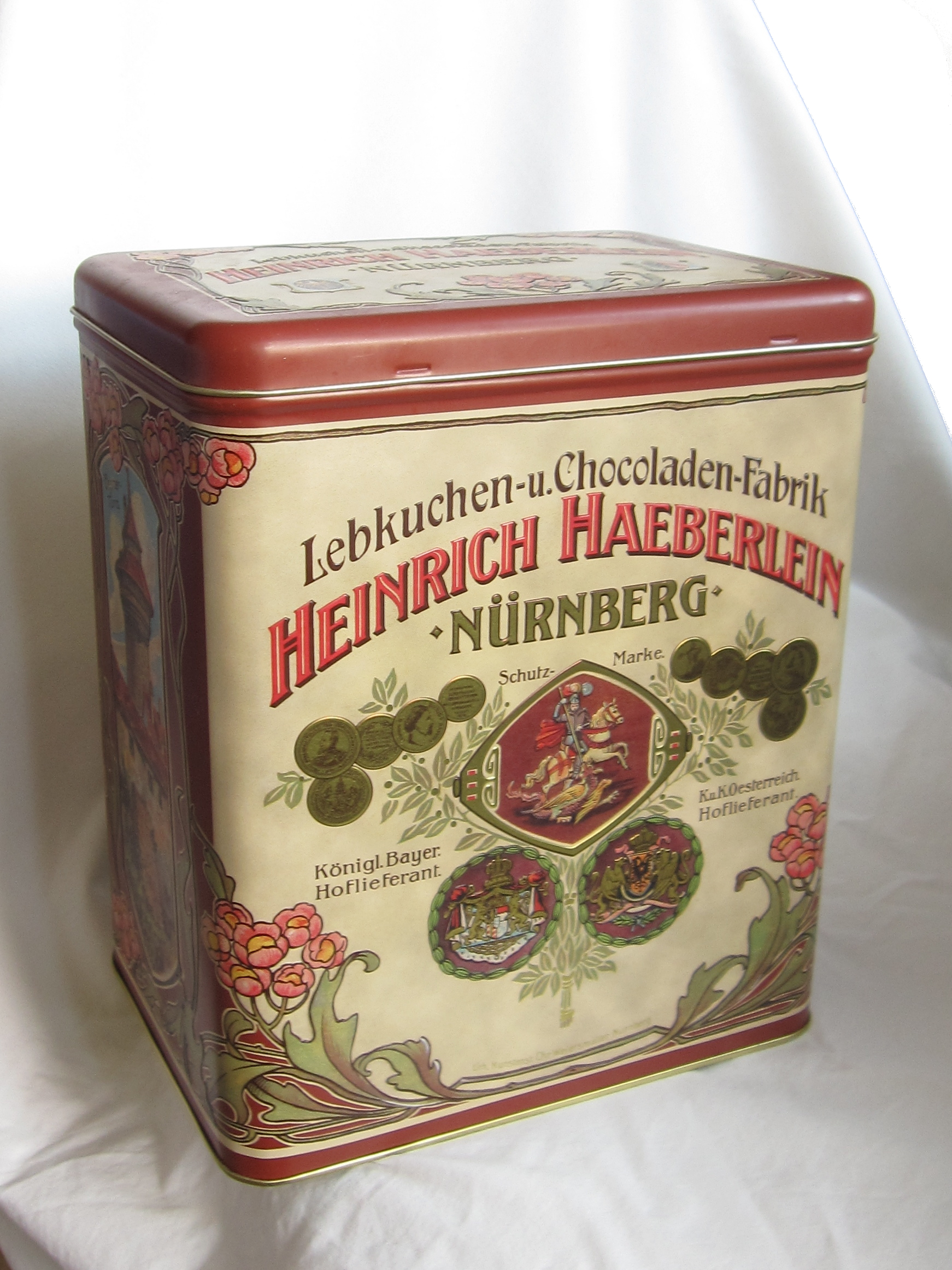
A gingerbread container

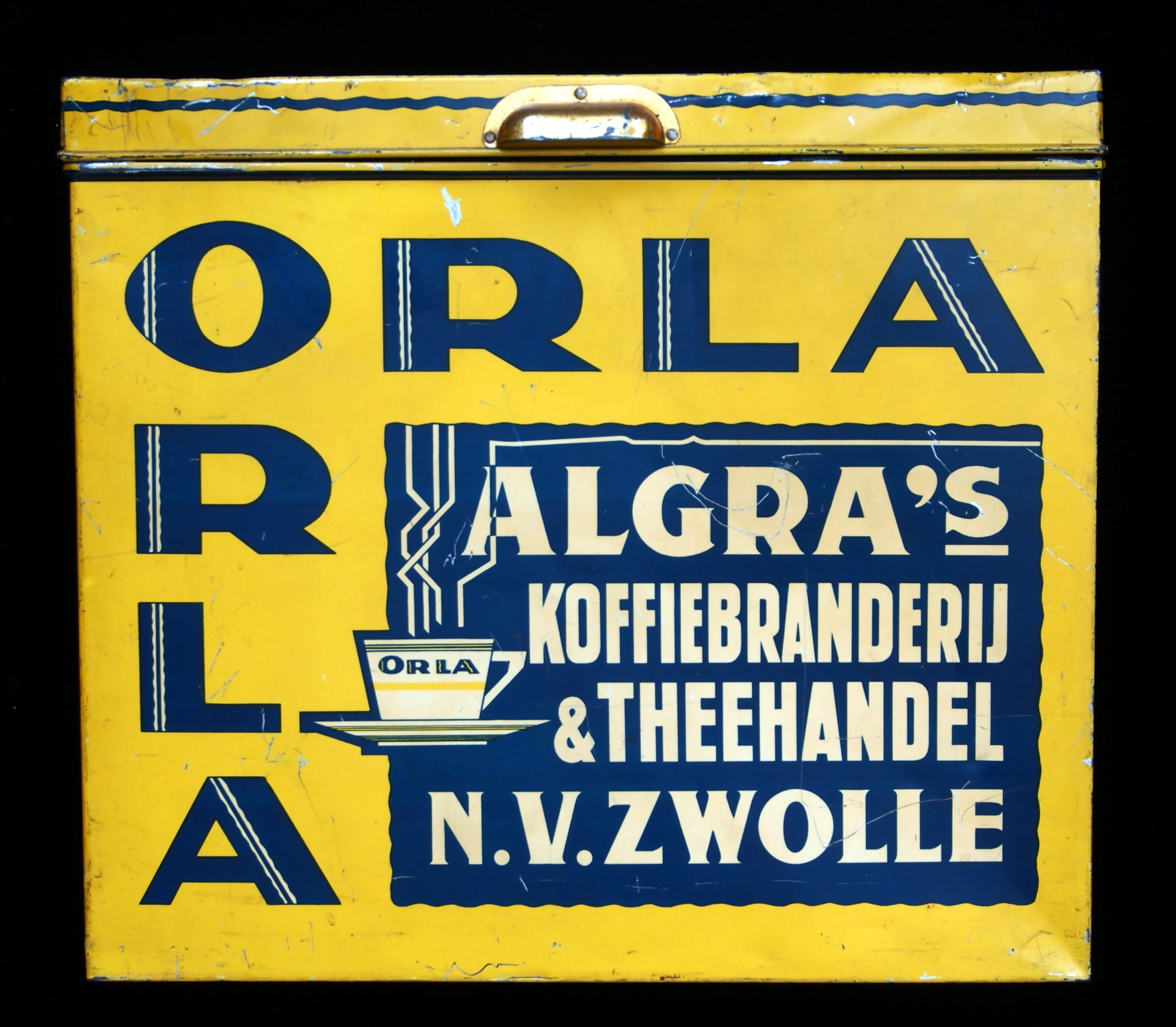
A coffee or tea container

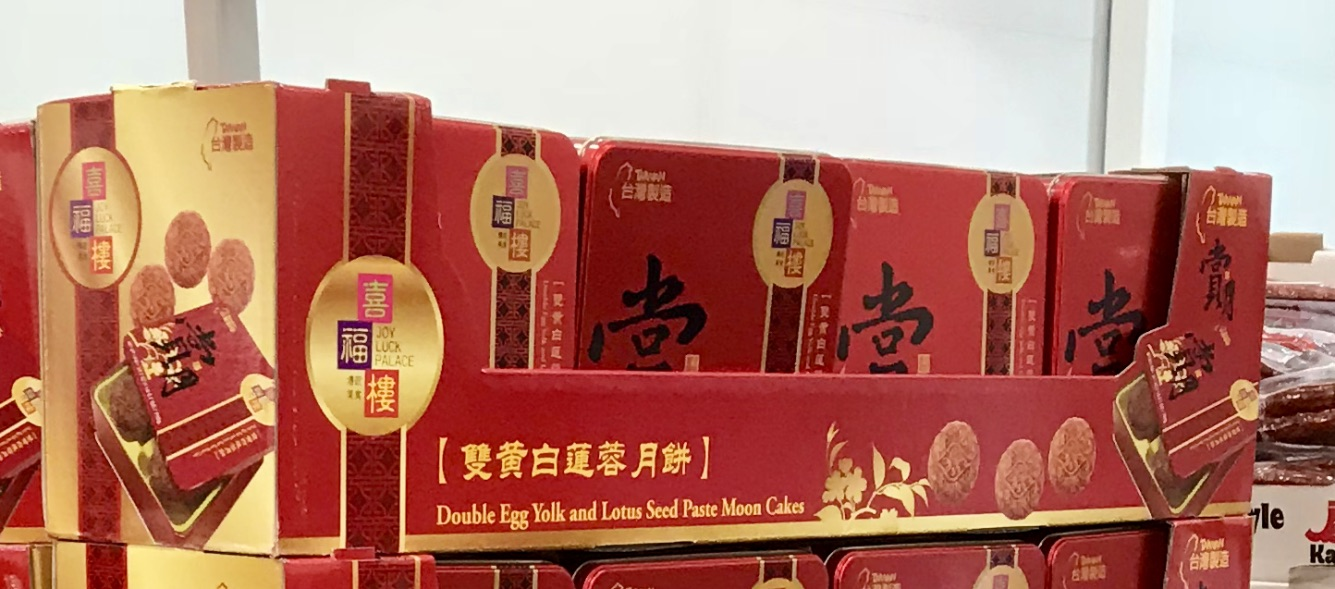
Display box with tinplate cans of mooncakes

=== Construction ===
Some types of metal tins or cans have hinged covers; Others cans have removable interference fit covers or lids. The lid, which sometimes is hinged to the body of the container, is often held in place when closed by friction. In other cases, two protruding lugs can pass each other only when the lid and the rest of the box are deformed slightly: pressure from the user's hands is sufficient to produce this deformation, while the parts resist this somewhat, and are flexible enough to recover their normal shape when released.

=== Collecting ===
Some people collect these types of tin boxes. For example, Yvette Dardenne in Belgium has amassed a collection of approximately 56,800 tin boxes over two decades.

== Gift Boxes ==
Some companies also use tinplate to make gift cans and boxes, like Candle tin, Coin bank, Christmas tin box, Easter egg tin etc.

== Trunks ==
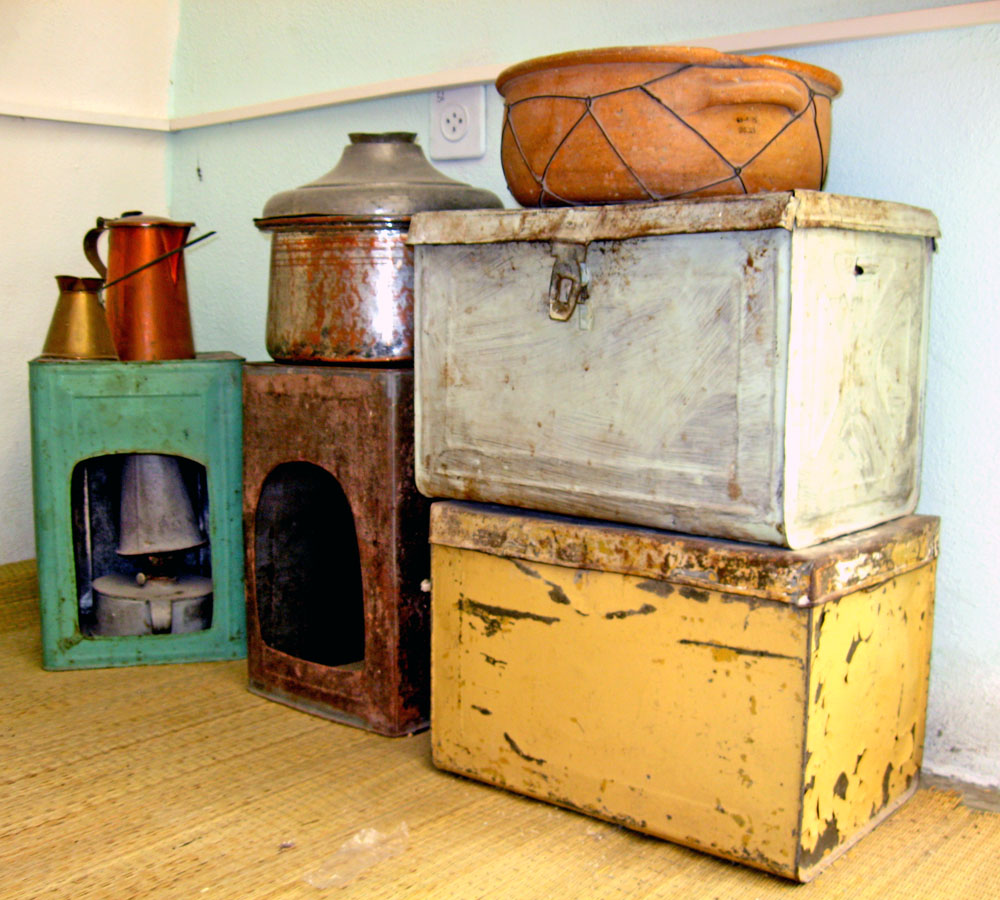
Large decorated tin trunks

Trunks and chests are sometimes constructed of tinplate. These large boxes often have a hinged top cover and are sometimes highly decorated.

== See also ==
- Steel can
- Decorative box
- Lunch box
