= Parliamentary snuff box =

Snuff box of the British House of Commons

The parliamentary snuff box

The parliamentary snuff box is a wooden snuff box at the door of the House of Commons of the United Kingdom where snuff is stored for use by Members of Parliament. The practise originated after 1694 when smoking was banned in the House of Commons of England. It is the responsibility of the Principal Doorkeeper to ensure it is kept stocked.

== History ==
In 1694, the Parliament of England passed a resolution banning smoking in the House of Commons of England and in committee rooms. Following this, members still wished to take tobacco so snuff was used as a tolerated alternative to smoking as attributed to Erskine May: Parliamentary Practice. In 1941, the House of Commons chamber was destroyed by a German bomb on the Palace of Westminster. The current parliamentary snuff box was created using timber from the destroyed chamber's door frame with a silver plate listing all the names of the Principal Doorkeepers since 1943 screwed onto the lid. The responsibility for maintaining the parliamentary snuff box lies with the Principal Doorkeeper who stocks the box with snuff paid for with his own money.

== Attention ==
Until the 2010s, the rights of MPs to have free snuff was a little known tradition of the House of Commons. A Freedom of Information request in 2010 confirmed the existence of the tradition and that it was filled with snuff chosen by the Principal Doorkeeper which he selected from a local tobacconist. The request did not reveal which members took advantage of the free snuff privilege, as the last recorded instance of an MP taking snuff was in 1989, when 1.5 ounces (43 g) was taken at a cost of 99p.

In 2012, the parliamentary snuff box was mentioned in a debate by the Green Party MP for Brighton Pavilion, Caroline Lucas, who criticised the parliamentary snuff box for being outdated. The Conservative Party MP for Gillingham and Rainham, Rehman Chishti, also wrote a question about how much had been used in the previous decade. The response was that there were no known users of the parliamentary snuff box. It was also noted that while under the Health Act 2006 it is illegal to give out free tobacco in the United Kingdom, Parliament is exempt from this as the Palace of Westminster is a royal palace, and therefore legally exempt from the legislation.

== See also ==
- Candy Desk
- Presidential M&M's
