= Doorkeeper (Houses of Parliament) =

Messengers and guards of the Palace of Westminster

The doorkeepers are badged officers of the United Kingdom Houses of Parliament.

The role of doorkeeper dates back to the 1300s, when the Palace of Westminster also served as a court and they served as prison guards. Over time their role changed to that of messengers from Parliament to the king. They wear a uniform of a black long-tailed coat, white bow tie, and a silver-gilt waist badge of office. Underneath each badge hangs a figure of Mercury, the messenger of the gods, symbolic of this early role.

== House of Commons ==
In the House of Commons there are 37 doorkeepers who serve as part of the Department of Chamber and Committee Services (DCCS) in the section of the Serjeant-at-Arms.

Currently, their principal role is the security of the House of Commons, and each doorkeeper is equipped with a book containing the names and photographs of all 650 MPs. Since the tradition that the reigning monarch is barred from entering the House of Commons also extends to police officers as sworn servants of the Crown, the doorkeepers are responsible for the physical security of the house, receiving the same training as the police in restraining and removing any members of the public. The doorkeepers also deliver messages, copies of Hansard, enquiries from Hansard editors, and the "green cards" – notes from members of the public who have come to see their MP. When the House is not in session they have duties relating to visitors to Parliament.

As well as maintaining the security of the chamber, galleries and committees of the House of Commons, the doorkeepers also have ceremonial duties. When the Commons is in session the Principal Doorkeeper and his deputy occupy two chairs on either side of the main entrance. The Principal Doorkeeper sits in the right-hand seat, which contains the original division bell, though an electronic system is now in use. When the house divides to vote members have eight minutes before the doorkeepers close and lock the doors to the chamber preventing anyone from entering. However at the end of each sitting the original bell is rung, and the two doorkeepers simultaneously shout "Who goes home?". The Principal Doorkeeper's seat also contains a box of snuff, which has been there for the use of members and officials ever since smoking was banned in the chamber in 1693.

During the State Opening of Parliament when Black Rod summons the House of Commons to attend the House of Peers, the doors to the Commons chamber are ceremonially closed by the doorkeepers in their face. Black Rod strikes the door three times and only then is allowed to enter.

== House of Lords ==
In the House of Lords there are 24 doorkeepers who serve in the Department of Black Rod. The Principal Doorkeeper and his doorkeepers work in teams, each managed by a senior doorkeeper. Their responsibilities include maintaining good order and security in and around the chamber, providing a reception facility at the Peers' Entrance, and managing members of the public wishing to view the proceedings. They also provide a message and letter board service for peers, and are trained in first aid. They also attend some committees of the house, and participate in ceremonial occasions, such as the State Opening of Parliament.
