= Presidential M&M's =

Candy gift from the president of the United States

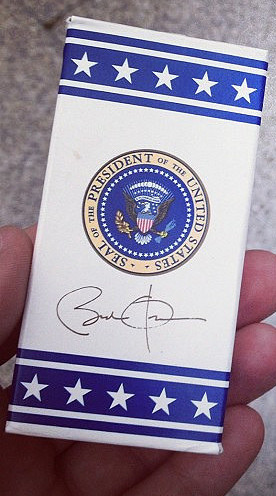
Packs of presidential M&M's during the Obama administration

Presidential M&M's is the name given to the commemorative packs of red, white, and blue-colored M&M's given to guests of the president of the United States on board Air Force One and in other presidential locations. They were first created in 1988 and they later replaced cigarettes as the standard gift given to guests of the president. The M&M's are presented in boxes about the size of a packet of cigarettes, with the seal of the president of the United States and the signature of the sitting president on one face, and one of the M&M's characters holding the flag of the United States on the other.

== History ==
Under President John F. Kennedy, guests and members of the press who traveled on Air Force One were given packs of 20 cigarettes in a box marked with the presidential seal and the signature of the sitting president, along with a matchbook. After Kennedy's assassination, the large quantities of cigarettes distributed by the White House and Air Force One became a tradition. President Ronald Reagan replaced most of the cigarettes with jars of Jelly Belly jelly beans shortly after taking office, to maintain a consistent anti-drug image. At the 1988 Moscow Summit with Secretary Mikhail Gorbachev, Mars, Incorporated supplied customized M&M's for gifts, which First Lady Nancy Reagan gave to Russian children. After the summit, Nancy Reagan saw an opportunity to ban all smoking on Air Force One, replacing the few remaining cigarette supplies aboard. Thereafter, M&M's became the official candy of the White House.

President George H. W. Bush continued Reagan's tradition of handing out M&M's to presidential guests but extended the privilege to presidential employees. President Bill Clinton altered the packaging to include the signature of the sitting president beneath the presidential seal. President Barack Obama personally handed out packs of presidential M&M's to guests. Obama also gave them out to children trick or treating at the White House on Halloween, along with dried fruits from First Lady Michelle Obama.

In 2014, Spanish prime minister Mariano Rajoy gave President Obama facsimiles of three 500-year-old historical works. In return, Obama gave Rajoy some presidential M&M's. The perceived inequality of the exchange provoked criticism from the Spanish press.

On President Donald Trump's first flight aboard Air Force One, unsigned boxes of M&Ms were provided because the ones with Trump's signature were not yet available.

== See also ==
- Candy Desk – United States Senate tradition since 1965
- List of candies
- Parliamentary snuff box – Snuff box of the British House of Commons
