= Decorative box =

Decorated package

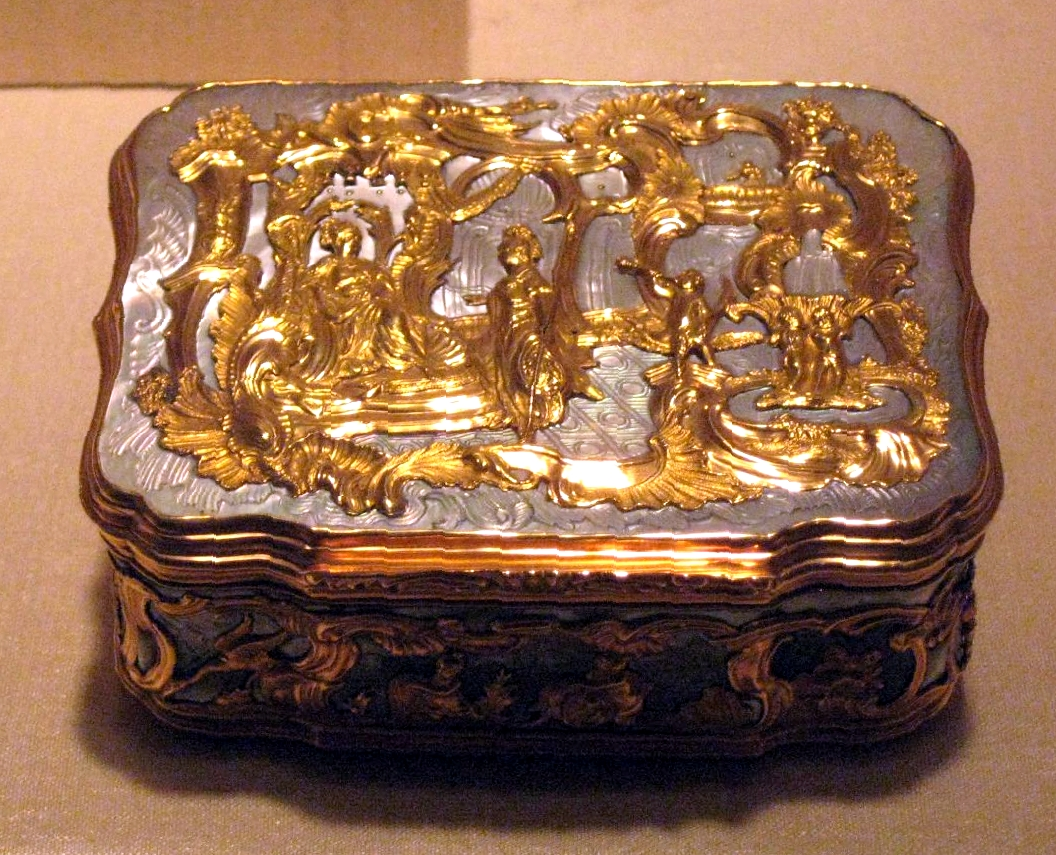
18th-century German gold and mother of pearl snuff box

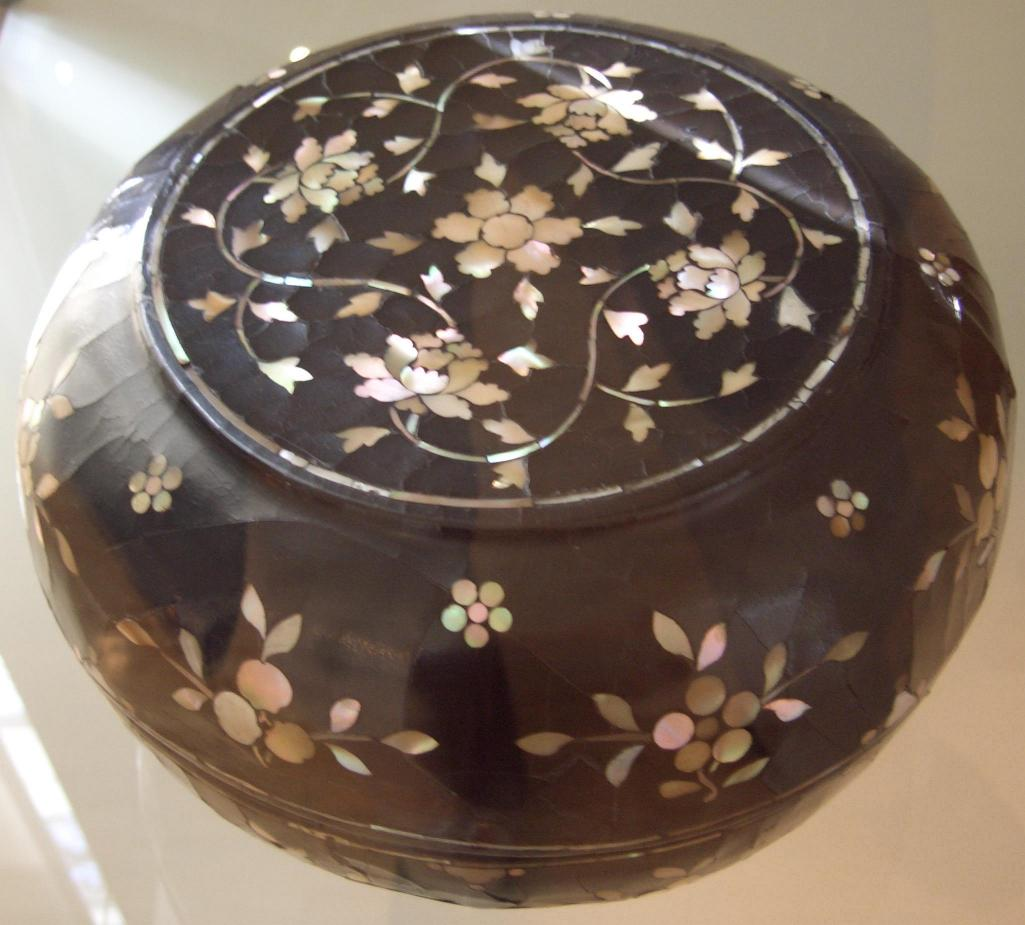
Chinese mother of pearl lacquer box with peony decor Ming Dynasty

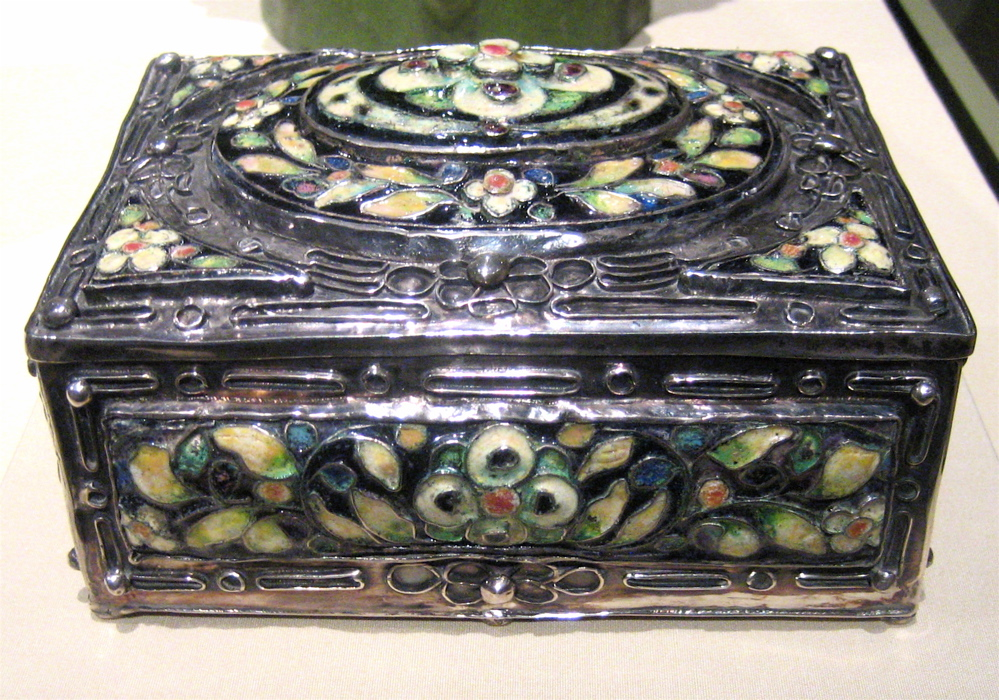
Elizabeth E Copeland (1866–1957) covered box, circa 1915 metalwork, silver and cloisonné, Los Angeles County Museum of Art

A decorative box is a form of packaging that is both decorative and functional. Many such boxes are used for promotional packaging, both commercially and privately. Historical objects are usually called caskets if larger than a few inches in more than one dimension, with only smaller ones called boxes.

== Gift box ==
Traditionally, gift boxes used for promotional and seasonal gifts are made from sturdy paperboard or corrugated fiberboard. These boxes normally consist of a base and detachable lid and are made by using a die cutting process to cut the board. The box is then covered with decorative paper. Gift boxes can be dressed with other gift packaging material, such as decorative ribbons and gift tissue paper.

== Work box ==
The most common type of decorative box is the work box, most commonly used by women. It is usually fitted with a tray divided into many small compartments for needles, reels of silk and cotton, and other necessaries for stitchery. The date of its origin is unclear, but 17th-century examples exist, covered with silk and adorned with beads and embroidery.

No lady would have been without her work box in the 18th century. In the second half of that century, elaborate pains were taken to make these boxes dainty and elegant.

Work boxes are ordinarily portable, but at times they form the top of a stationary table.

== Jewelry box ==
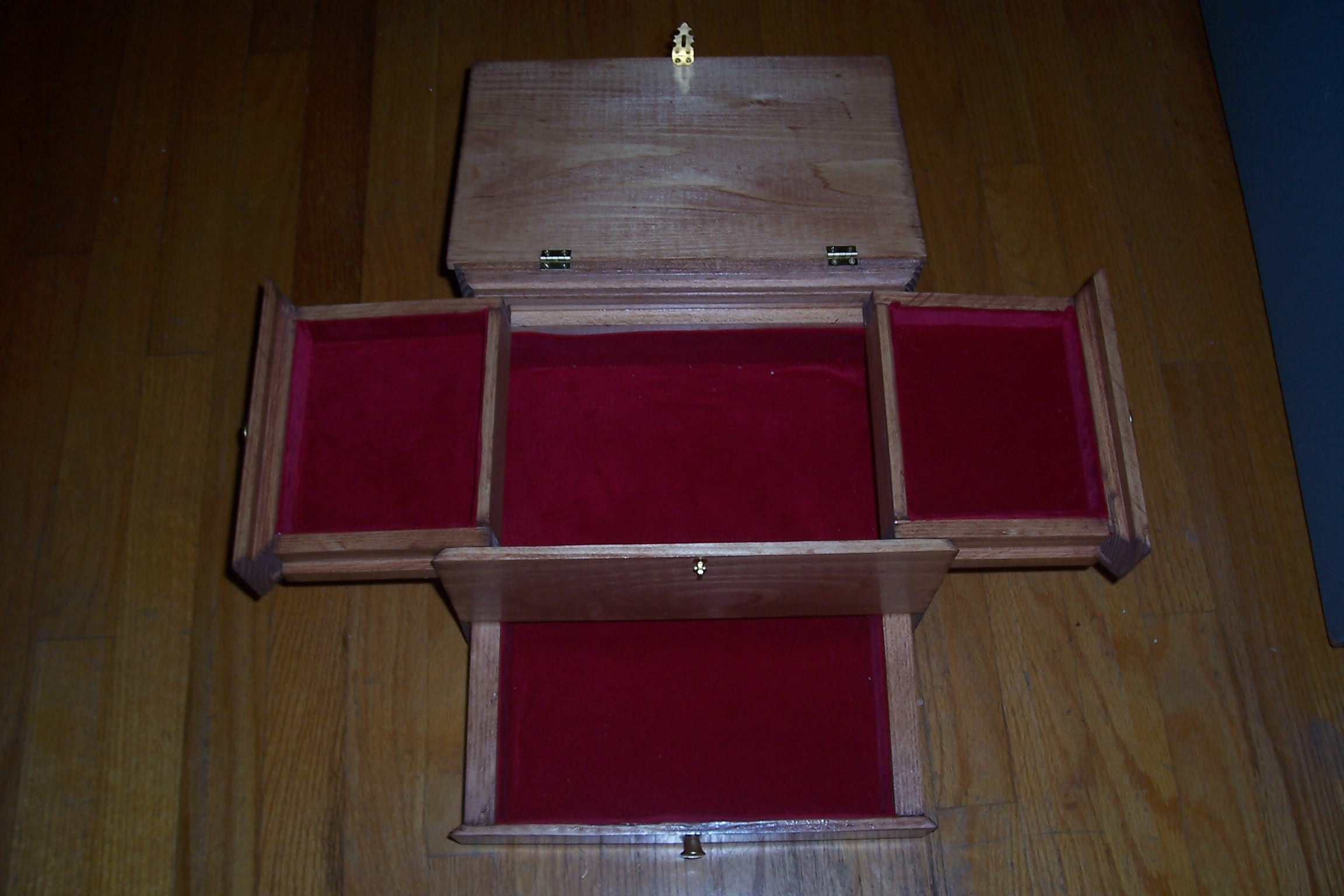
A jewel box lined with red velvet

A jewelry box, also known as a casket, is a receptacle for trinkets, not only jewels. It may take a very modest form, covered in leather and lined with satin, or it may reach the monumental proportions of the jewel cabinets which were made for Marie Antoinette, one of which is at Windsor Castle, and another at the Palace of Versailles; the work of Schwerdfeger as cabinetmaker, Degault as miniature-painter, and Thomire as chaser.

== Snuff box ==
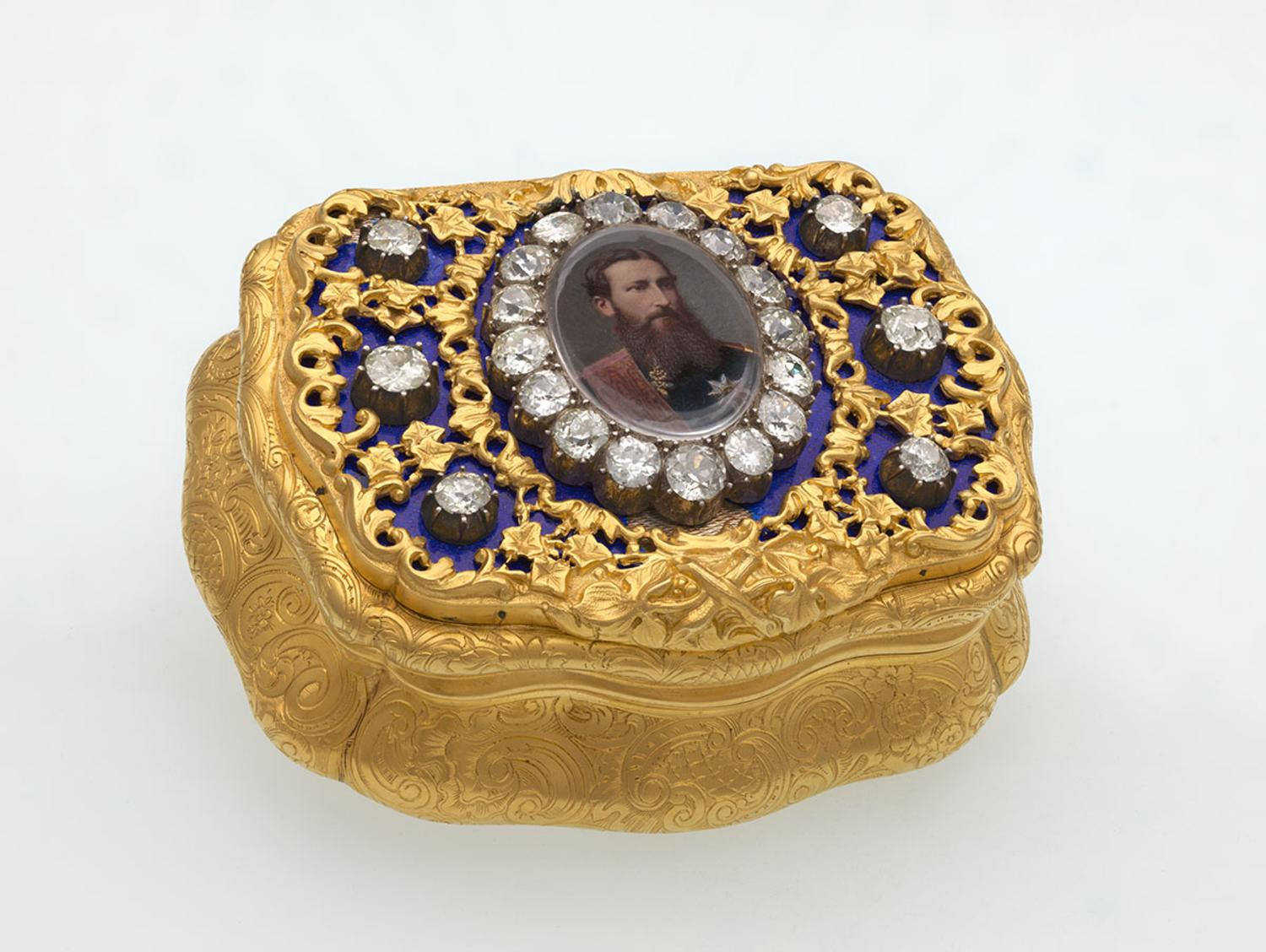
Snuff box with a miniature portrait of King Léopold II from the collection of the King Baudouin Foundation

One of the more functional types of decorative boxes is the snuff box. These were used for containing snuff, which is a mixture of ground tobacco and scented oils, these items were popularly used during the 18th century when snuff-taking was fashionable. Snuff boxes are made in two sizes – pocket boxes and communal boxes made for table use. Pocket boxes are usually made to hold a small amount of snuff for immediate consumption—typically a day or two's supply. Since prolonged exposure to air causes snuff to dry out and compromises its quality, snuff boxes have tightly sealed lids to ensure that air does not penetrate the box, although wholly air-tight boxes are a rarity. Table boxes can still be found in the mess of certain old regiments – often in the traditional 'ram's head' style – and a communal snuff box is kept in the House of Commons in the UK parliament.

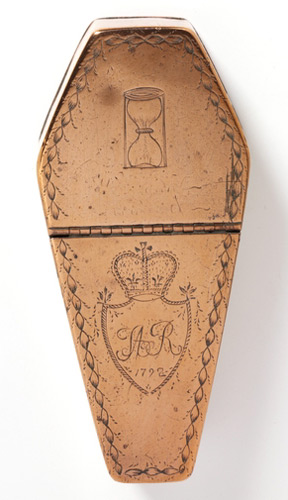
Coffin-shaped snuff box made from sheet copper, raised, tinned inside and engraved. 1792, Victoria and Albert Museum

People of all social classes used these boxes when snuff was at its peak of popularity and the wealthy carried a variety of fancy snuff-boxes created by craftsmen in metal-work, jewellers and enamellers. Some of these were elaborately made and decorated, rich in detail and made from precious or expensive materials such as gold, silver and ivory and were often adorned with artwork, gems and precious stones. Boxes made for the poorer snuff taker were more ordinary; popular and cheap boxes were made in papier-mâché and even potato-pulp, which made durable boxes that kept the snuff in good condition. Alloys that resembled gold or silver were developed in the 18th and 19th centuries such as the ersatz gold Pinchbeck and the silver look-alike, Sheffield Plate.

Other popular materials used in making these boxes include:

- Tortoise-shell, a favorite material owing to its satin lustre;
- Mother-of-pearl, which was kept in its natural iridescent state, or gilded, or used together with silver; and
- Exotic materials such as cowrie shells, enriched with enamels or set with diamonds or other precious stones.

The lids were often adorned with a portrait, a classical vignette, portrait miniature, hardstone inlays, or micromosaic panel. Some of the most expensive just used subtly different colours of gold. Perhaps the most widely used semi-precious metal was silver and snuff of all shapes and sizes were made in that metal during snuff's great popularity.

Even after snuff-taking ceased to be a general habit, the practice lingered among diplomats, doctors, lawyers and other professionals as well as members of professions where smoking was not possible, such as miners and print workers and snuff still has a considerable following, particularly amongst ex-smokers. Monarchs retained the habit of bestowing snuff-boxes upon ambassadors and other intermediaries as a form of honor. As Charles Maurice de Talleyrand explained, the diplomatic corps found a ceremonious pinch to be a useful aid to reflection in a business interview. At the coronation of George IV of the United Kingdom, Messrs. Rundell and Bridge, the court jewellers, were paid £8,205 for snuff-boxes for gifts to foreign representatives.

Today snuff boxes are collected at many levels – the high-end of the market being reserved for gold boxes that have been jewelled or have original art work on them, or boxes with provenance linking them to world figures, such as Napoleon or Lord Nelson. Some of the most expensive are French and German 18th century examples, and the record auction price for a German box is £789,250 (about US$1.3 million), bid in 2003 at Christie's in London.

Modern snuff boxes are made from a variety of woods, pewter and even plastic and are manufactured in surprising numbers due, largely, to snuff's resurgence amongst tobacco connoisseurs and ex-smokers.

== Strong box ==
A strong box is a receptacle for money, deeds and securities. Its place has been taken in modern life by the safe. Some have extremely elaborate locks, such as Sir Thomas Bodley's strong box in the Bodleian Library, which has a locking mechanism in the under-side of the lid.

== Knife box ==
In the Middle Ages, people usually brought their own cutlery with them when eating away from home, and the more expensive types came with their own custom-made leather cases, stamped and embossed in various designs. Later, as cutlery became provided by the host, decorative cases, especially for the knives, were often left on display in the dining-room. Some of the most elegant and often ornate were in the styles of Robert Adam, George Hepplewhite and Thomas Sheraton. Occasionally flat-topped containers, they were most frequently either rod-shaped, or tall and narrow with a sloping top necessitated by a series of raised veins for exhibiting the handles of knives and the bowls of spoons. Mahogany and satinwoods were most common, occasionally inlaid with marquetry, or edged with boxwood which was resistant to chipping. These receptacles, often made in pairs, still exist in large numbers; they are often converted into stationery cabinets. Another version is an open tray or rack, usually with a handle, also for the storage of table cutlery.

== Bible box ==
A Bible box is a box made to hold a Bible. These boxes started being manufactured in the 17th century.

== Étui ==
An étui (from the French, for keeper or holder) is a woman's ornamental case, usually carried in a pocket or purse. It holds small tools for daily use such as folding scissors, bodkins, sewing needles (a needlecase), hairpins, tweezers, makeup pencils, etc. Some étuis were also used to carry doctors' lancets. These boxes were made of various materials such as wood, leather, ivory, silver, gold, tortoise shell, mother of pearl, and shagreen. Fabergé created the Necessaire Egg as an étui.

== Wooden wine box ==
Wooden wine boxes, also known as wooden wine crates, are used to ship and store expensive wines in transit and cellarage. Most wineries that use wooden boxes burn their logo and designs onto the front panel. Originally intended as purely practical items, these panels or the whole box are often used by bars or wine collectors as decorative pieces for their bars or wine cellars. A typical wooden wine box holds either six or twelve 750 ml (26 imp fl oz; 25 US fl oz) bottles.

== See also ==
- Biscuit tin
- Can collecting
- Tin box
- Wooden box
- Cigar box
