= Traditions of the United States Senate =

The United States Senate observes a number of traditions, some formal and some informal. Some of the current and former traditions are described below:

== New senators ==
=== Maiden speeches ===
From the Senate's earliest days, the new members have observed a ritual of remaining silent during floor debates for a period of time. Depending on the era and the senator, this has ranged from several months to several years. Today, this obsolescent Senate tradition survives only in part—the special attention given to a member's first major address, or maiden speech.

=== Jefferson Bible ===
Beginning in 1904 and continuing every other year until the 1950s, new members of Congress were given a copy of the Jefferson Bible, an edited version of the Bible by Thomas Jefferson that excluded what he felt were statements about the supernatural. Until the practice first stopped, copies were provided by the Government Printing Office. A private organization, the Libertarian Press, revived the practice in 1997.

== Daily rituals ==
The procedural activities of the Senate are guided by the Standing Rules of the Senate. Tradition states that each day is begun with the Chaplain's Daily Prayer, which can be given by the Senate chaplain, or a representative of any faith. Following the prayer, the Senate recites the Pledge of Allegiance.

== Departing senators ==
At the end of a session of Congress it is traditional for senators to read speeches into the Congressional Record praising the efforts of colleagues who will not be returning for the next session.

If a senator dies in office, it is traditional for the Senate to adjourn for a day and for U.S. flags to be flown at half-staff. A black cloth and a vase filled with white roses are placed over the deceased senator's desk, and a large contingent of senators often travel to the home state of the departed senator to pay their respects.

== Washington's Farewell Address ==
The Senate holds an annual reading of President George Washington's Farewell Address. This tradition, originally designed to be a morale-boosting gesture during the darkest hours of the American Civil War, began on February 22, 1862.

== Senate chamber ==
A number of items located around the Senate chamber are steeped in tradition.

=== Senate desks ===
In 1819 new desks were ordered for the senators to replace the original set which was destroyed in the British attack on Washington in the War of 1812. The Daniel Webster desk has the oldest design as it lacks a 19th-century modification to add extra storage space to the top. When Daniel Webster acquired this seat, he pronounced that if his predecessor could organize himself to work with the reduced desk space, so could he. Every subsequent senator who has sat at that desk has also declined to have it improved. In keeping with a 1974 Senate resolution, this desk is assigned to the senior Senator from Webster's birth state, New Hampshire. Jeanne Shaheen has been the occupant of this desk since 2011.

==== Etching ====
In the early twentieth century, a tradition of senators engraving their own name on the bottom of the desk drawers emerged.

==== Candy desk ====
In 1965, California senator George Murphy began a tradition of keeping a desk near the back of the chamber stocked with candy. This continues today.

=== Senate gavel ===
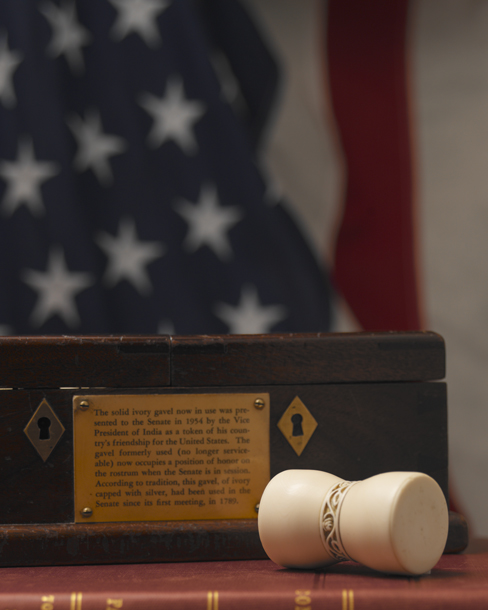
The 1954 ivory gavel, along with the ceremonial mahogany box

The Senate uses three gavels, each of which has an hourglass shape with no handle. The first gavel, which had been used since at least 1789, cracked during the 1954 Senate session when then Vice President Richard Nixon (acting as President of the Senate) used it during a heated debate. Prior to this, an attempt to further prevent damage to the old gavel was done by adding silver plates to both ends. A replacement gavel made of ivory was presented to the Senate by the Republic of India and first used on November 17, 1954. In response to widespread awareness of elephant poaching and illegal ivory trades, a white marble gavel has been in use since at least 2021. The old gavel was briefly out of retirement by Vice President Kamala Harris on December 5, 2023 to cast her record breaking 32nd tie breaking vote as Senate president.

All three gavels are kept in a mahogany box that is carried to the senate floor by a page; at the adjournment of a senate session the gavels are taken to the Sergeant at Arms' office for safekeeping.

== Bean soup ==
According to custom, bean soup is available on the Senate dining room menu every day. This tradition, which dates back to the early twentieth century, is variously attributed to a request by Senator Fred Dubois of Idaho, or, in another version of the story, to Senator Knute Nelson of Minnesota. The Dubois recipe includes mashed potatoes and yields five gallons of soup. There are two Senate soup recipes.

== Seersucker Thursday ==
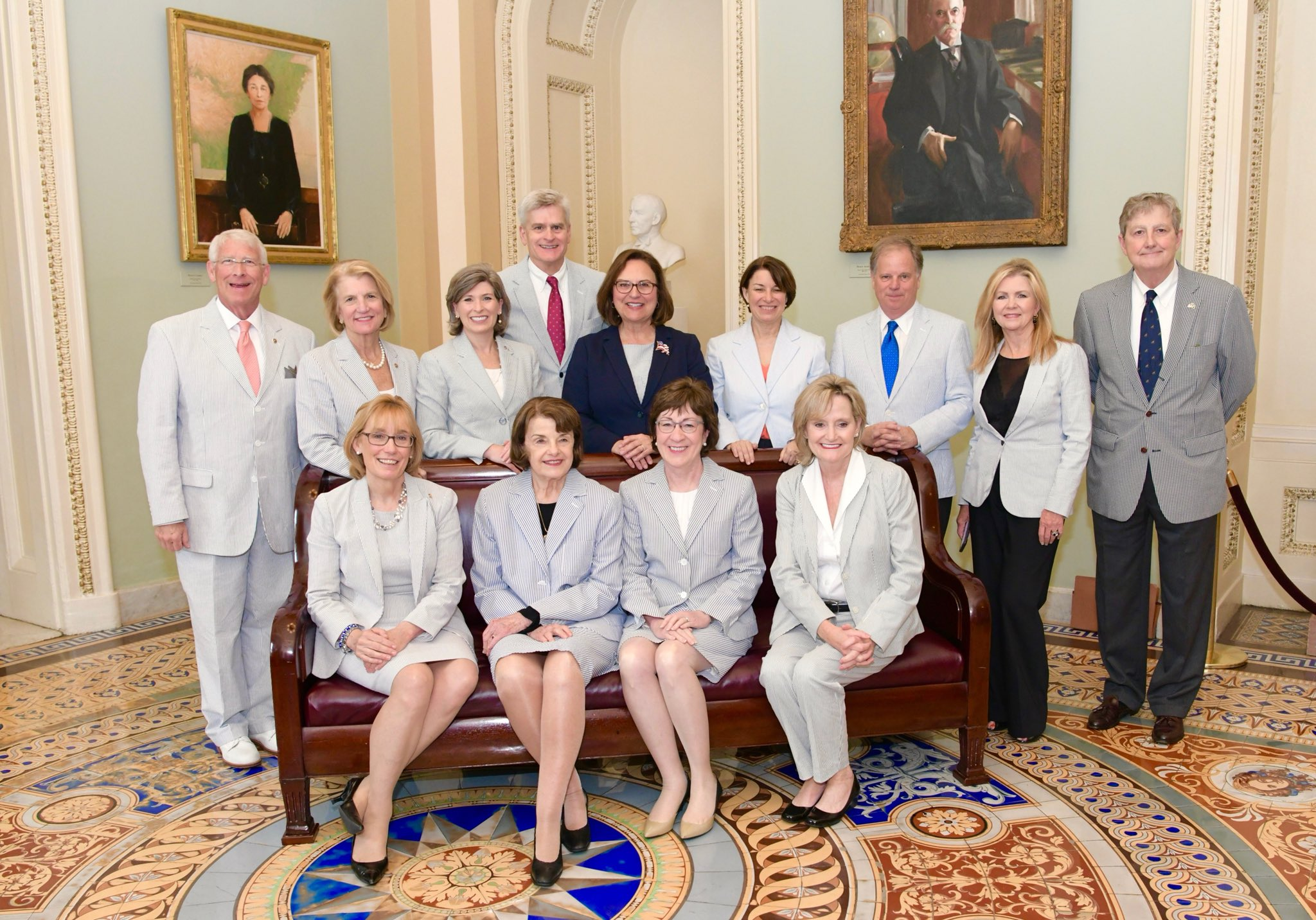
Members of the Senate on Seersucker Day 2019.

Seersucker Thursday is an annual tradition in which senators wear clothing made of seersucker on National Seersucker Day. This light, cotton-based material is traditional in the Southern United States.

The tradition was started by Republican Senator Trent Lott of Mississippi in 1996 who wanted to "bring a little Southern charm to the Capitol" to remind the Senate of how senators dressed before the advent of air conditioning in the 1950s. The practice was temporarily suspended in 2012 amid congressional gridlock, but began again in 2014.

While this tradition is an annual event, it is not uncommon to see congressional staffers don seersucker suits on Thursdays throughout the year.

== Federal appointee customs ==
As a body, the Senate tends to afford great deference to any member's objection regarding a nominee to a federal office having geographical ties to that member's state, especially when the objecting member has the same party affiliation as the president. Objections from members of the party in opposition to the president generally are not afforded the same weight. However, the blue slip policy of the Judiciary Committee allows even members of the president's opposition party to block nominees to positions as federal district and appellate court judges, U.S. attorneys, and federal marshals.

Another custom relating to the Senate's power "to advise and consent" is that when a nominee for federal office is a current or former U.S. senator, the nomination generally proceeds towards a vote without first being referred to the relevant committee. Additionally, senators will tend to vote their approval of the nominee, even when the nominee is of the other party, although they are not bound by the custom to do so. Only in exceedingly rare instances has the Senate referred such nominations to committee or rejected the nominee.
