= Creamy snuff =

Snuff paste sold in a toothpaste tube

Creamy snuff is a snuff paste consisting of tobacco, clove oil, glycerin, spearmint, menthol, and camphor, and sold in a toothpaste tube. It is packaged in tubes similar to those used for toothpaste. The product is addictive. A similar product, known as gul or gadakhu, is made with dried rose petals soaked in sugar syrup and fermented and used mainly in India as a mouth freshener. A Tobacco Control public-health commentary has described “toothpaste”-marketed creamy snuff sold in toothpaste-like tubes as a tactic to circumvent Indian restrictions on tobacco as an ingredient in dentifrices, In 1992, the Indian government banned the use of tobacco toothpowder or toothpaste after widespread misconception that tobacco is good for teeth.

== See also ==
- Chewing tobacco
- Snus
