= Snuff box (disambiguation) =

A snuff box is a decorative box for snuff (tobacco).

Snuff box or Snuff Box may also refer to:

- Snuff Box (TV series), a British television series
- Anatomical snuffbox, a part of the human hand
