= Snuff (tobacco) =

Smokeless tobacco type

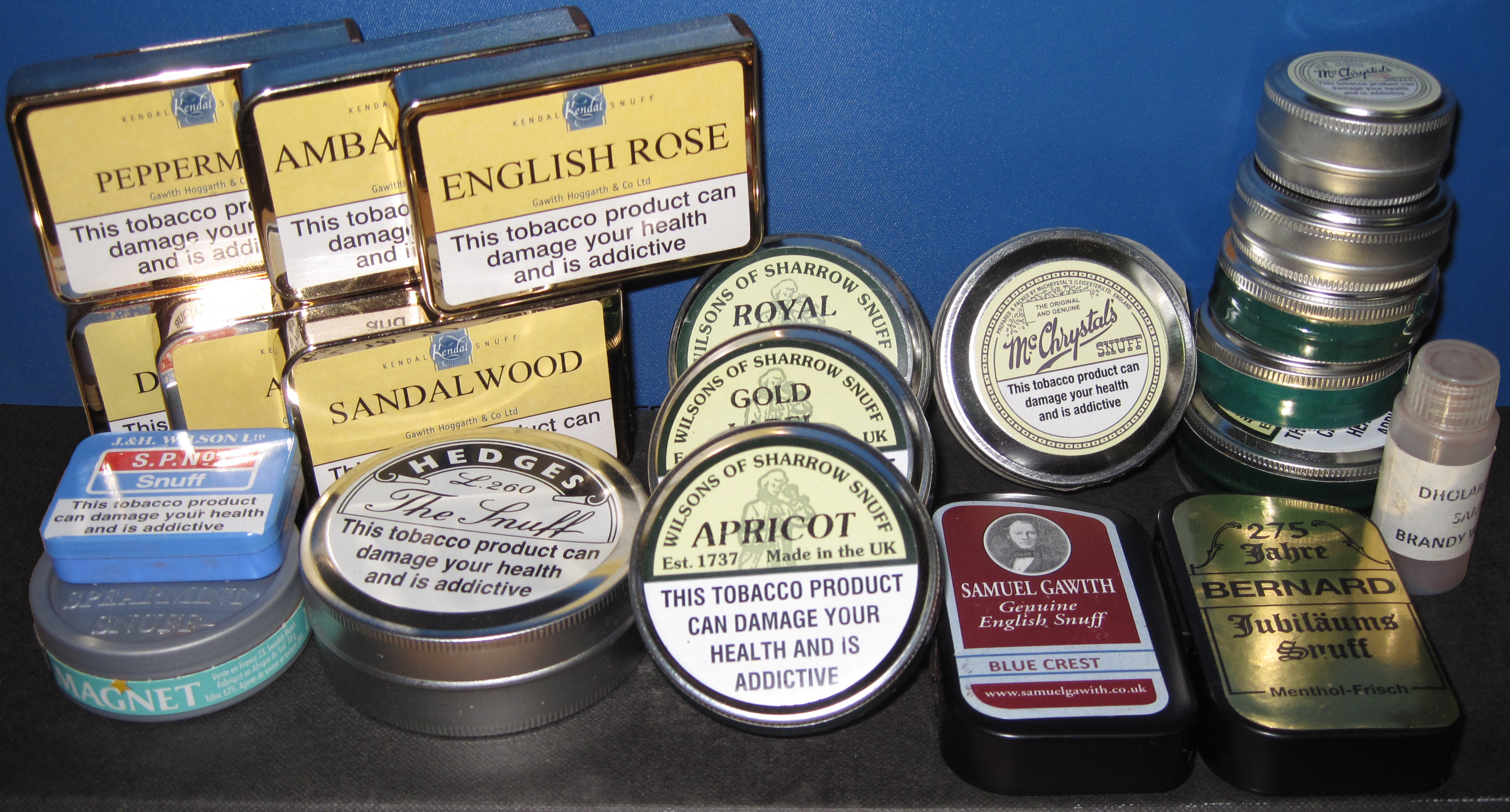
Assorted tins of nasal snuff tobacco

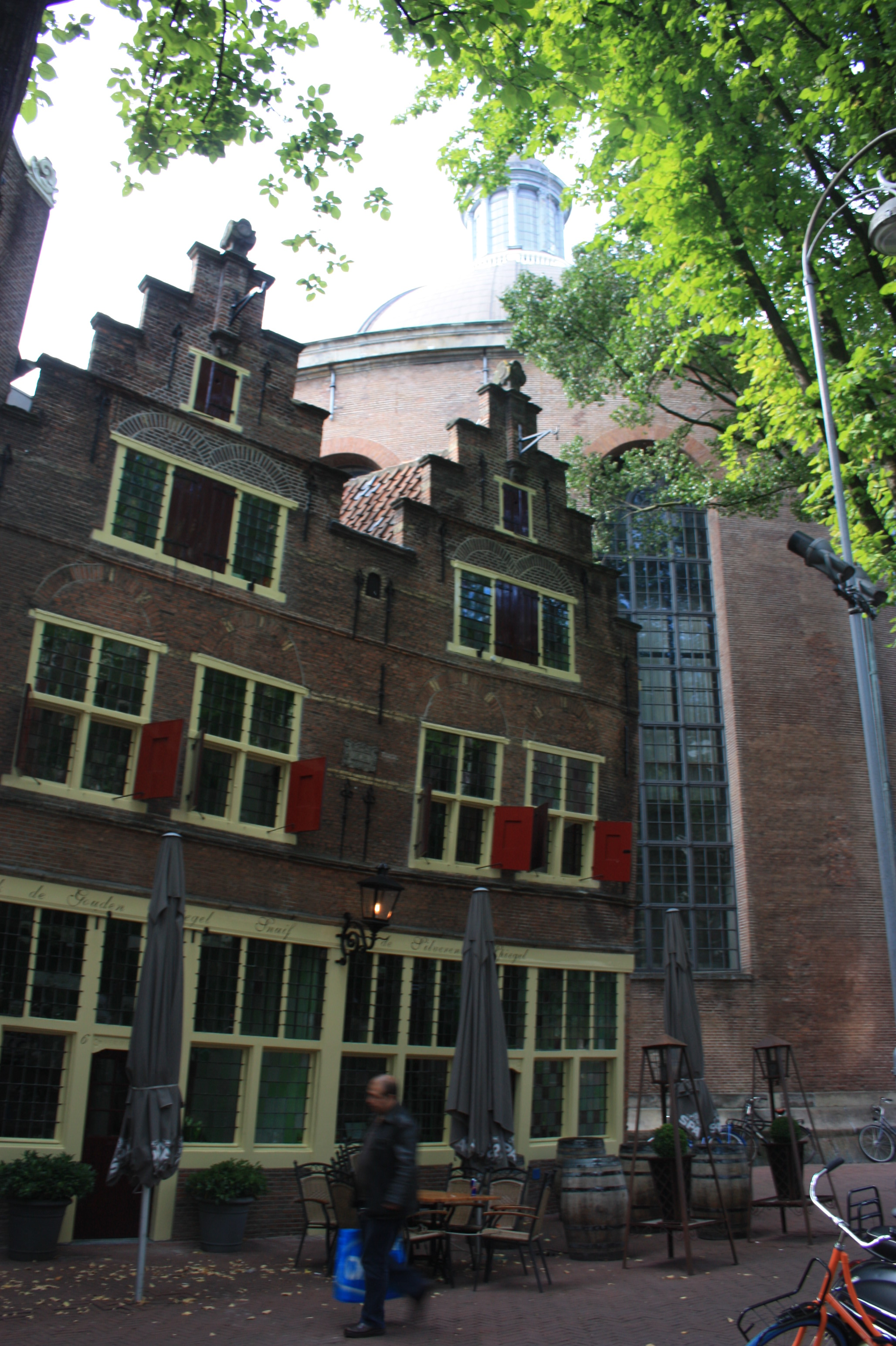
A 17th-century snuff shop in Amsterdam

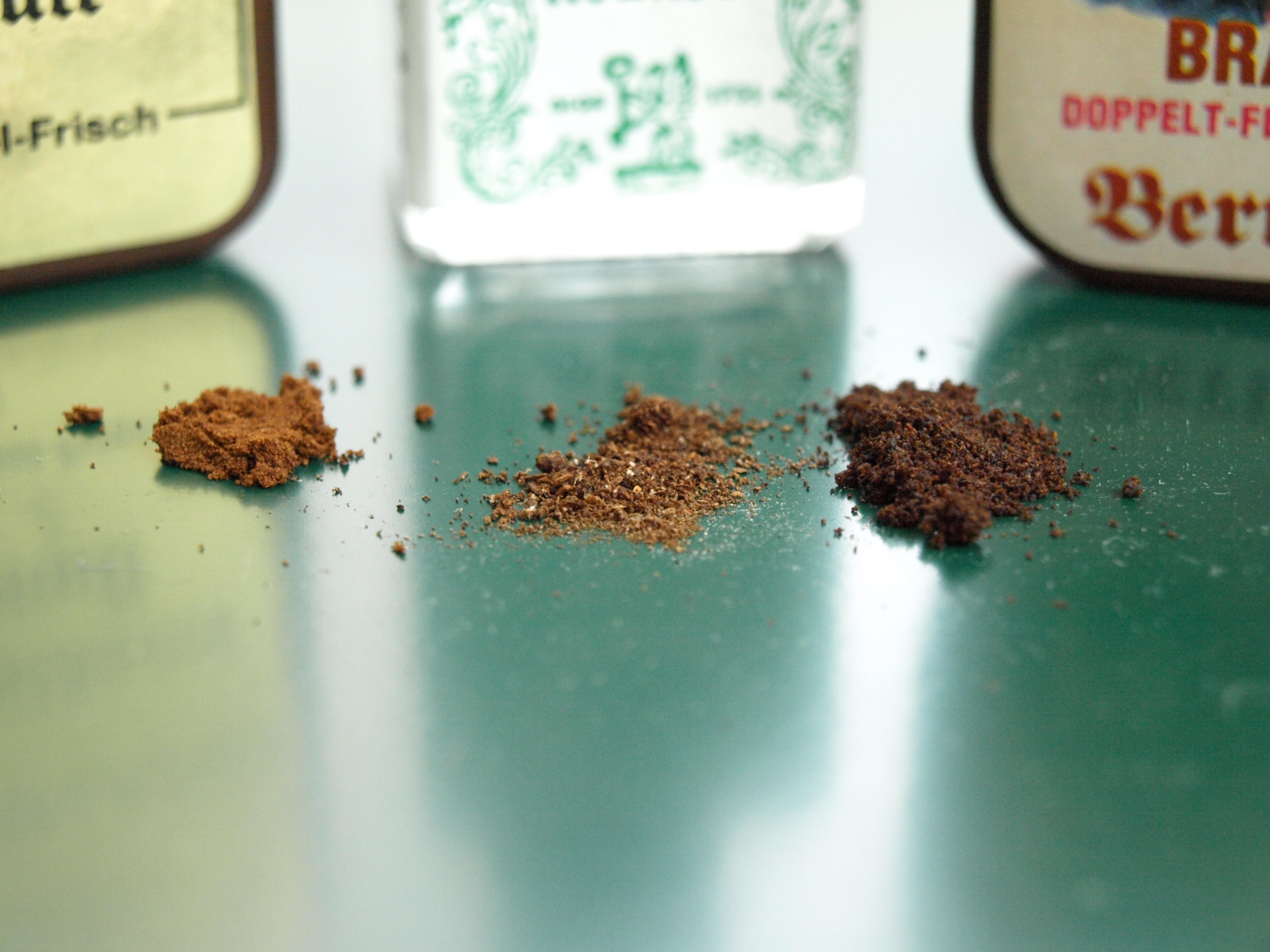
Several types and consistencies of snuff tobacco

Snuff is a type of smokeless tobacco product made from finely ground or pulverized tobacco leaves. It is snorted or "sniffed" (alternatively sometimes written as "snuffed") into the nasal cavity, delivering nicotine and a flavored scent to the user (especially if flavoring has been blended with the tobacco). Traditionally, it is sniffed or inhaled lightly after a pinch of snuff is either placed onto the back surface of the hand, held pinched between thumb and index finger, or held by a specially made "snuffing" device.

Snuff originated in the Americas, and was commonly used in Europe by the 17th century. Traditional snuff production consists of a lengthy, multi-step process, in tobacco snuff mills. The selected tobacco leaves are first subject to special tobacco curing or fermentation processes, where they will later provide the individual characteristics and flavor for each type of snuff blend. Snuff is usually scented or flavored, with many blends of snuff requiring months to years of special storage to reach the required maturity. Typical traditional flavors are varieties of blended tobacco leaves considered original "fine snuff" without any addition of scents or essences. Varieties of spice, piquant, fruit, floral, and mentholated (also called "medicated") soon followed, either pure or in blends. Each snuff manufacturer usually has a variety of unique recipes and blends, as well as special recipes for individual customers. Common flavors also include coffee, chocolate, bordeaux, honey, vanilla, cherry, orange, apricot, plum, camphor, cinnamon, rose and spearmint. Modern flavors include bourbon, cola and whisky. Traditional classic German snuff blends are the pungent and sharp Schmalzler and Brasil blends.

Snuff comes in a range of texture and moistness, from very fine to coarse, and from toast (very dry) to very moist. Often drier snuffs are ground more finely. There is also a range of tobacco-free snuffs, such as Pöschl's Weiss (White), made from glucose powder or herbs. While strictly speaking, these are not snuffs because they contain no tobacco, they are an alternative for those who wish to avoid nicotine, or for "cutting" a strong snuff to an acceptable strength.

== Accessories ==
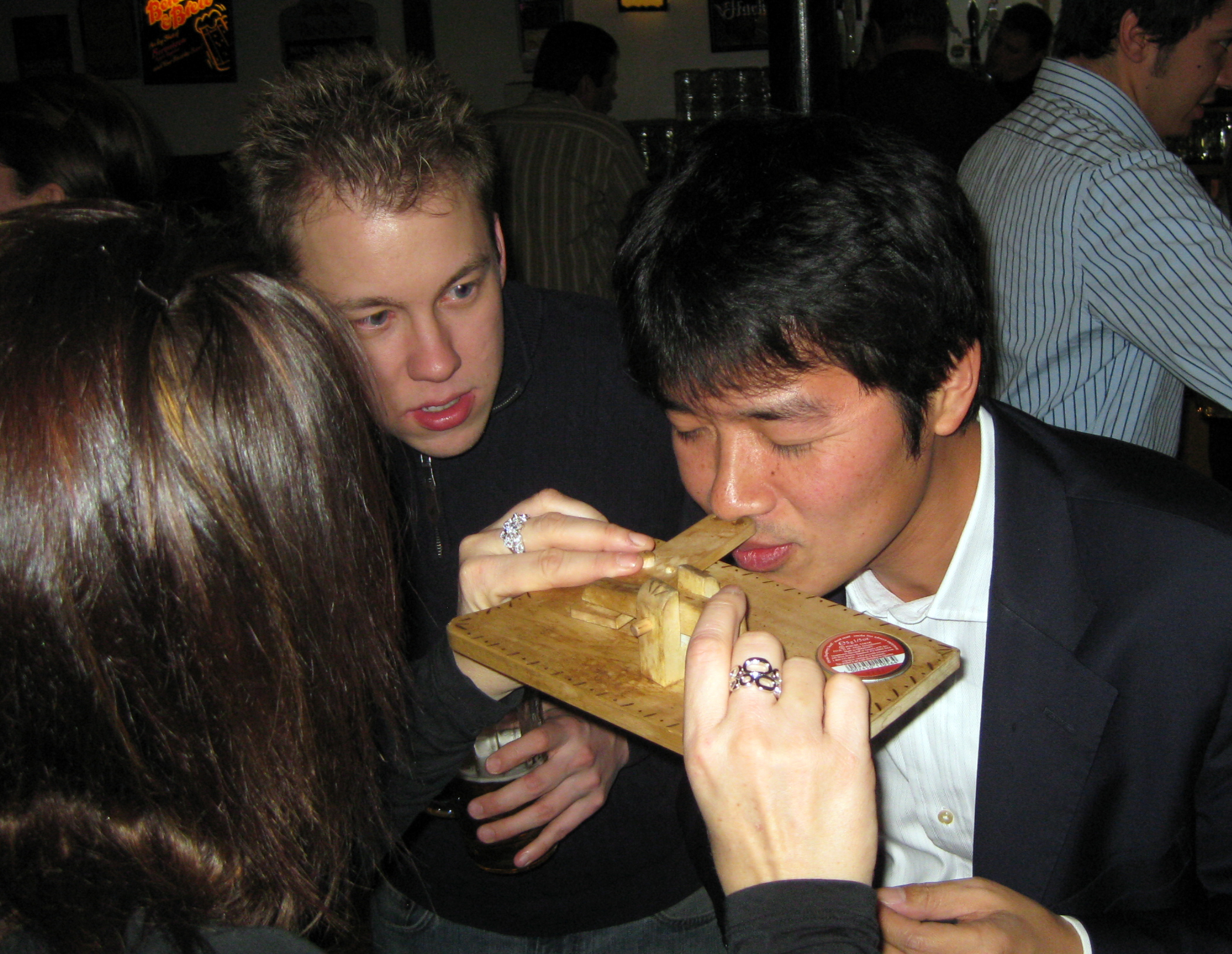
Spring-loaded novelty device used to shoot snuff directly into one's nostrils

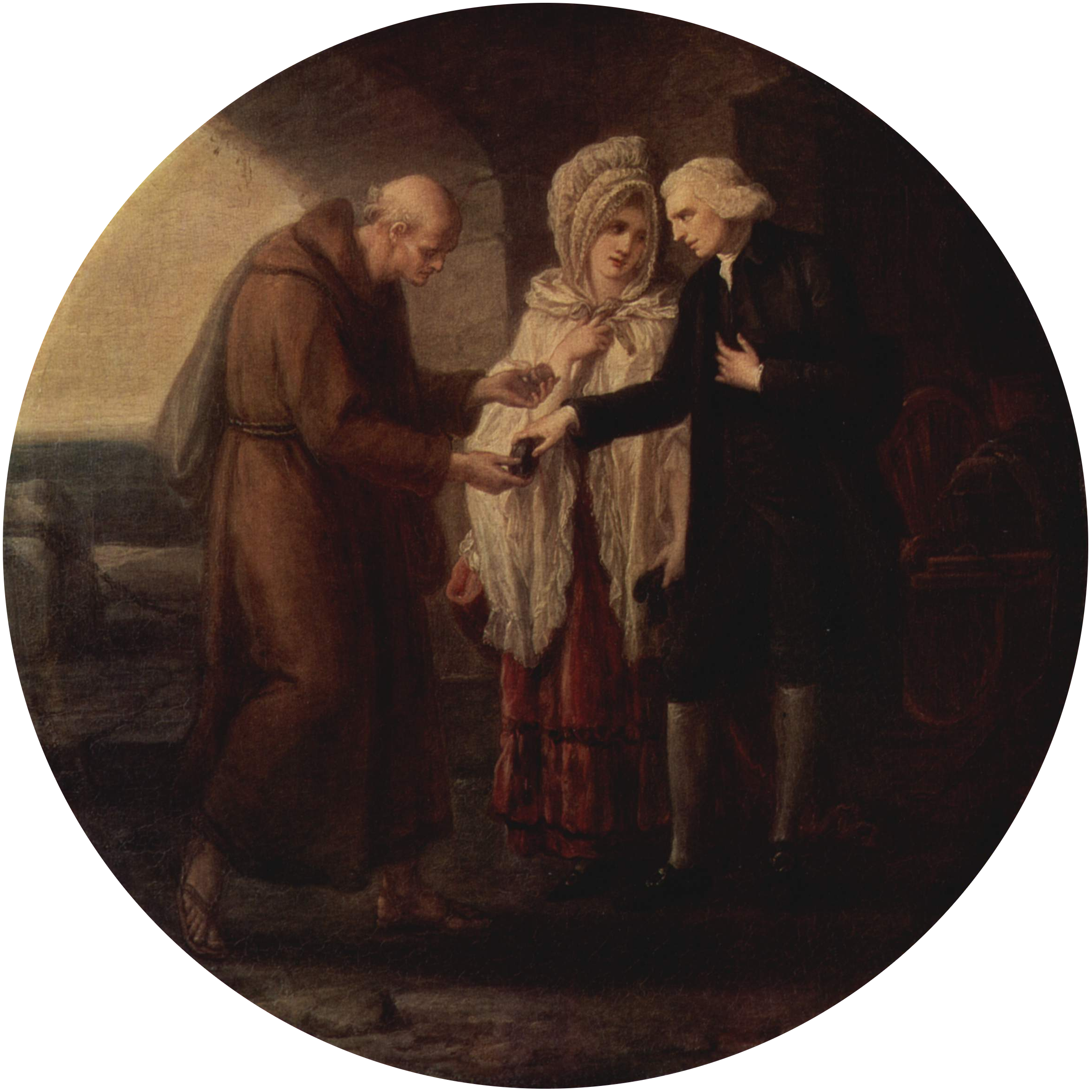
The Monk of Calais (1780) by Angelica Kauffman, depicting Pastor Yorick exchanging snuffboxes with Father Lorenzo "... having a horn snuff box in his hand, he presented it open to me.—You shall taste mine—said I, pulling out my box and putting it into his hand." From Laurence Sterne's A Sentimental Journey

When snuff-taking was fashionable, the manufacture of snuff accessories was a lucrative industry in several cultures. In Europe, snuff boxes ranged from those made in very basic materials, such as horn, to highly ornate designs featuring precious materials made using state-of-the-art techniques. Since prolonged exposure to air causes snuff to dry out and lose its quality, pocket snuff boxes were designed to be airtight containers with strong hinges, generally with enough space for a day's worth of snuff only. Large snuff containers, called mulls (made from a variety of materials, notably including rams' horns decorated with silver), were usually kept on the table.

An accessory often carried with the snuff box was the snuff spoon, a small spoon used for snuff-taking, that was used to avoid staining the fingers with powder.

A floral-scented snuff called "English Rose" is provided for members of the British House of Commons. Recent practice has been for this tradition to be maintained at the principal doorkeeper's personal expense due to smoking in the House being banned since 1693. A famous silver communal snuff box kept at the entrance of the House was destroyed in an air raid during World War II with a replacement being subsequently presented to the House by Winston Churchill. Very few members are said to take snuff nowadays.

In China, elaborately decorated snuff bottles became a status symbol among the elite of the Qing dynasty. These were usually available in two forms, both made of glass. In one type, glass bottles were painted on the inside to protect the design. Another type used layered multi-colored glass to create an image in relief. Besides glass, materials such as porcelain, agate, jade, coral, and lacquer were also used. Another common accessory is the snuff bullet, which is designed to make snuff use easier and more discreet in public situations. These are small, bullet shaped devices that you would use to store a small amount of snuff for use throughout the day.

The self-applicator pipe is known as 'Kuripe', and the blow pipe is known as a 'Tepi' in the Brazilian tradition.

== Health effects ==
Various national and international health organizations including the World Health Organization, the US National Cancer Institute, and the UK Royal College of Physicians stated that, even if it is less dangerous than smoking, using snuff is addictive, represents a major health risk, has no safe level use, and is not a safe substitute for smoking.

Smokeless tobacco globally contributes to 650,000 deaths each year with a significant proportion of them in Southeast Asia.

Quitting snuff use is as challenging as smoking cessation. There is no scientific evidence that using snuff can help a person quit smoking.

=== Cancer ===
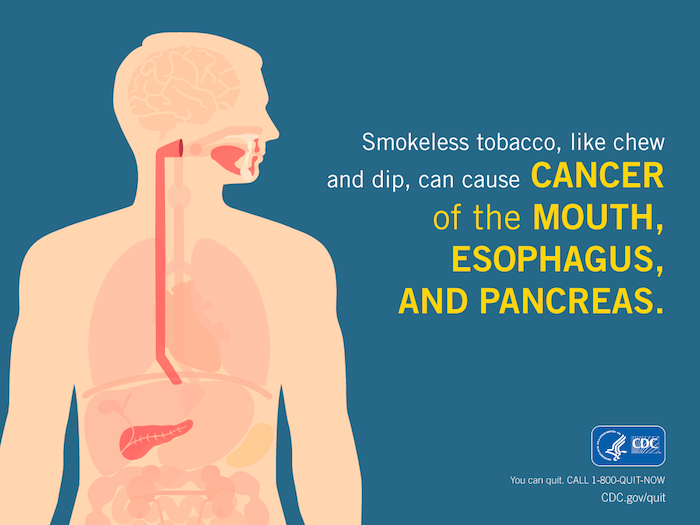
Graphic from the 2016 Centers for Disease Control and Prevention report entitled Smokeless Tobacco: Health Effects

Snuff is a cause of oral, oesophageal, and pancreatic cancer.

All tobacco products, including smokeless tobacco, contain cancer-causing chemicals. These carcinogenic compounds occurring in snuff vary widely, and depend upon the kind of product and how it was manufactured. There are 28 known cancer-causing substances in snuff products.

=== Cardiovascular disease ===
Using snuff increases the risk of fatal coronary heart disease and stroke. In 2010 more than 200,000 people died from coronary heart disease due to smokeless tobacco use.

=== Effects during pregnancy ===
Snuff can cause adverse reproductive effects including stillbirth, premature birth, low birth weight. Nicotine in snuff products that are used during pregnancy can affect how a baby's brain develops before birth.

PLAY three-second 1894 film of Fred Ott taking a pinch of snuff and sneezing; images by Thomas Edison's laboratory

== Sneezing ==
When sniffed, snuff often causes a sneeze, though this is often seen by snuff-takers as the sign of a beginner or amateur. This is not uncommon; however, the tendency to sneeze varies with the person and the particular snuff. Generally, drier snuffs are more likely to do this. For this reason, sellers of snuff often sell handkerchiefs. As the use of snuff increased, darker handkerchiefs with patterns became popular, so snuff stains would be less visible.

== Sale, tax and legal issues ==
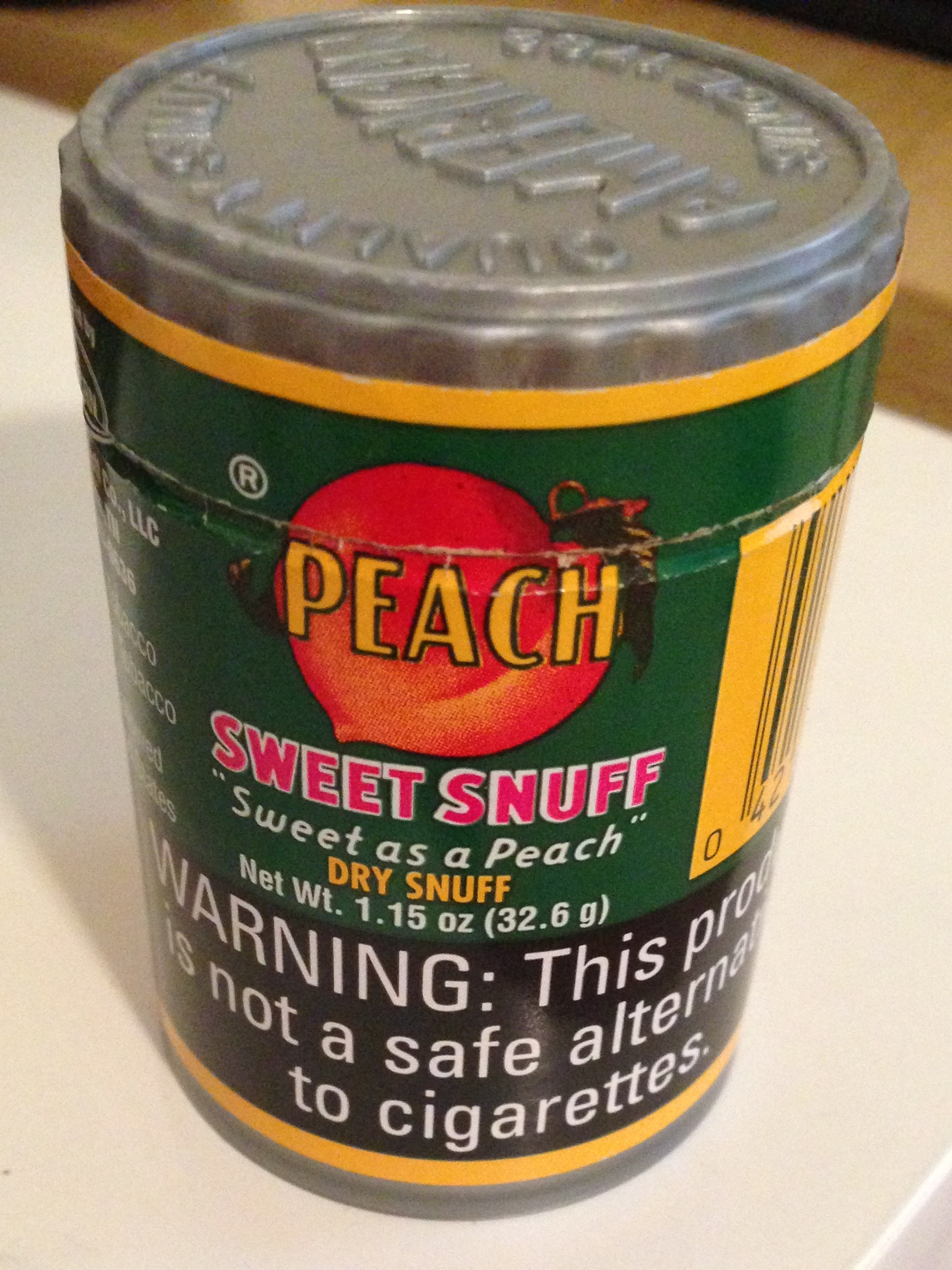
Container of Peach dry snuff, made in the United States

Snuff is readily available over the counter in most European tobacco shops. It is subject to the same sale and purchase age restrictions as with other tobacco products in accordance with local laws. In the United Kingdom, tobacco duty is not charged on "nasal" snuff tobacco.

In the Republic of Ireland it is illegal to take snuff in workplaces and bars.

In the United States, snuff is less readily available and is typically found only in specialty tobacco shops or online.

Smokeless tobacco products including snuff are banned from sale in Australia but up to 1.5kg may be imported for personal use only.

== History ==
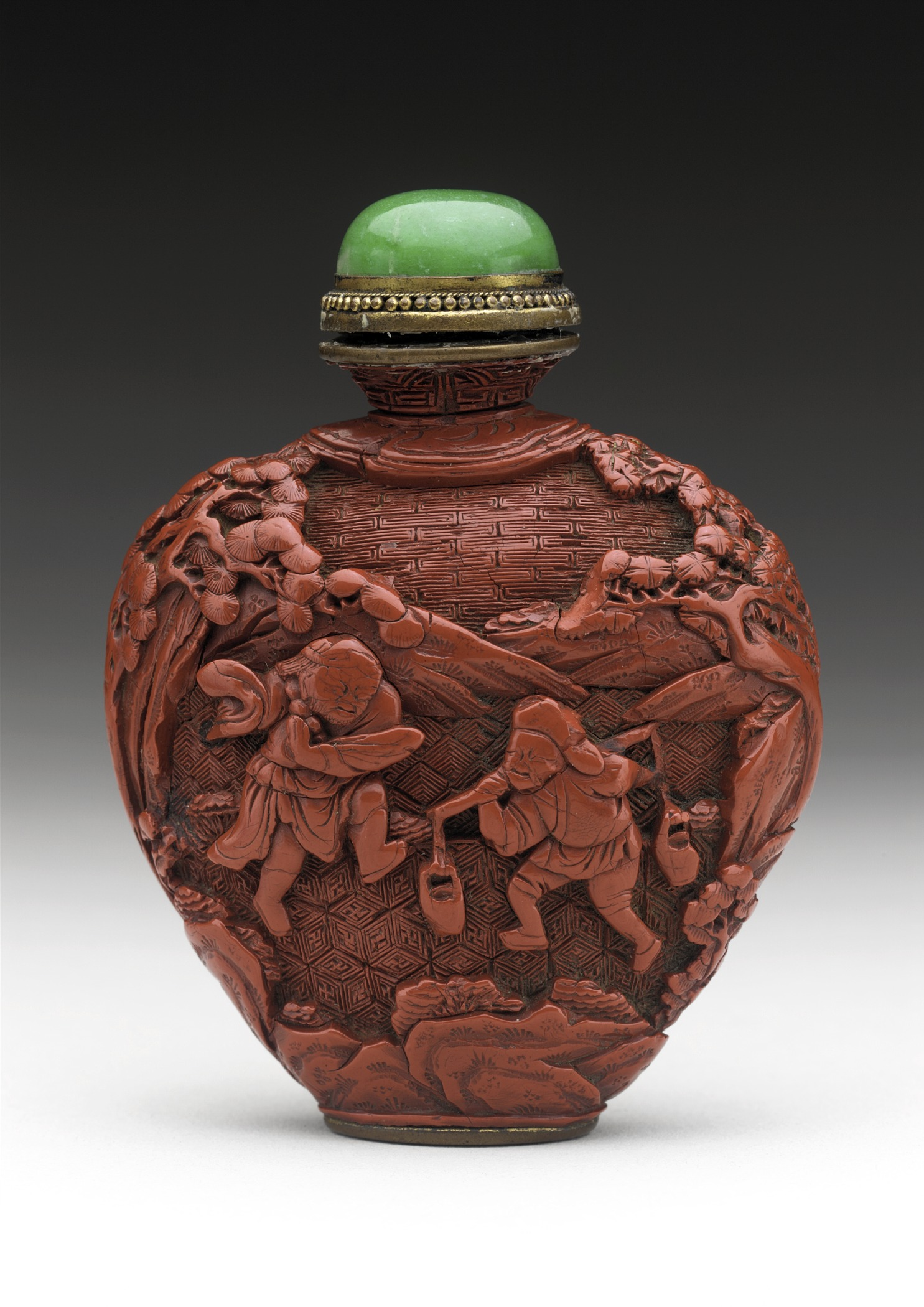
Chinese snuff bottle made of carved lacquer and jade, c. 18th century

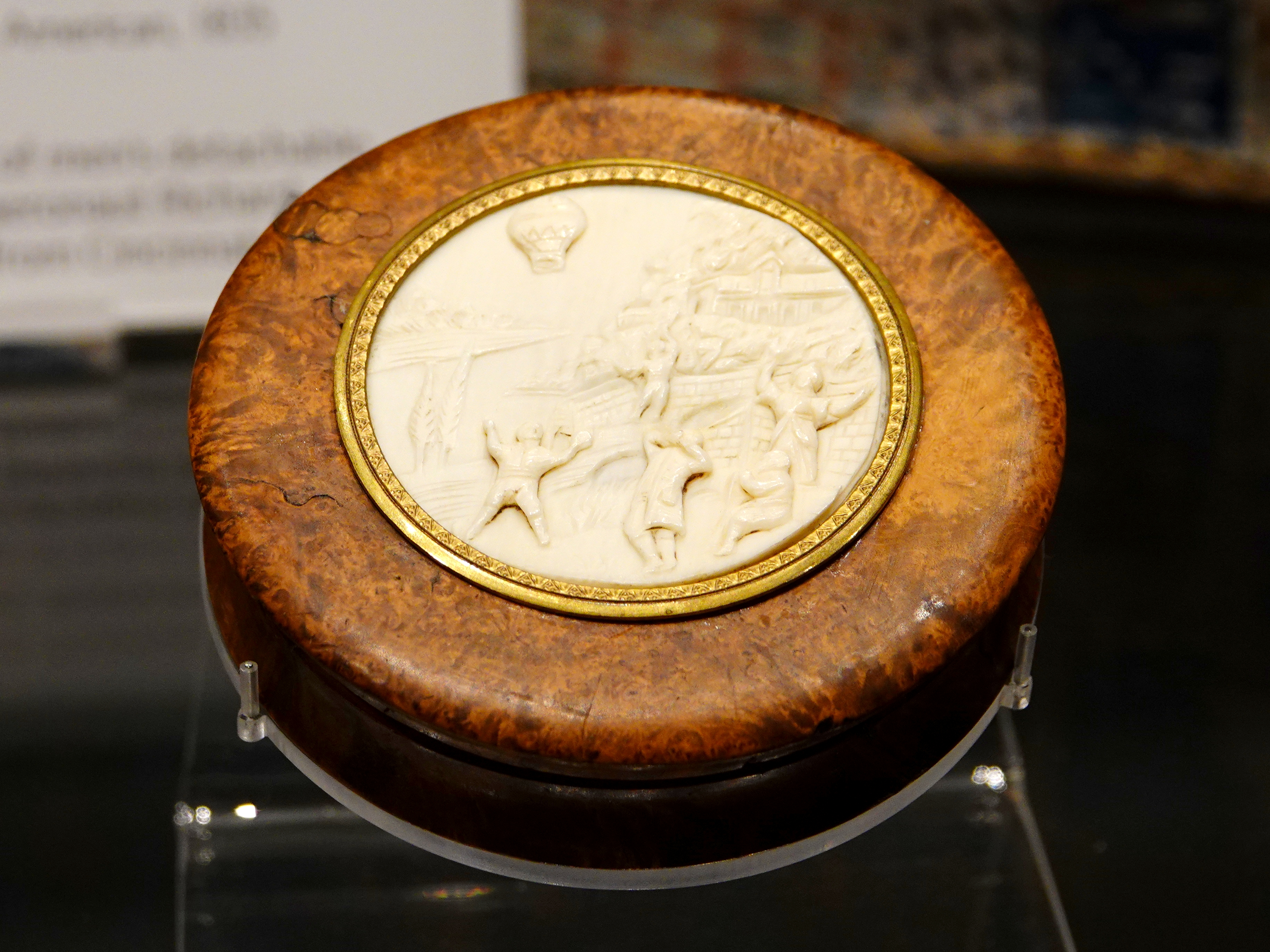
French 18th-century snuff box

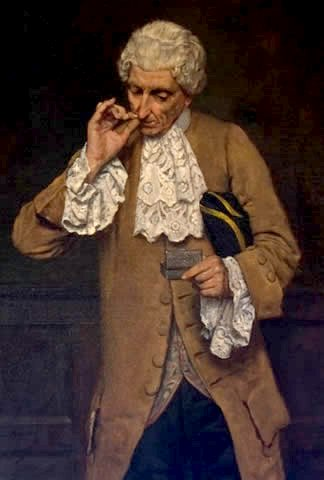
Painting of a man taking snuff using the thumb and index finger method

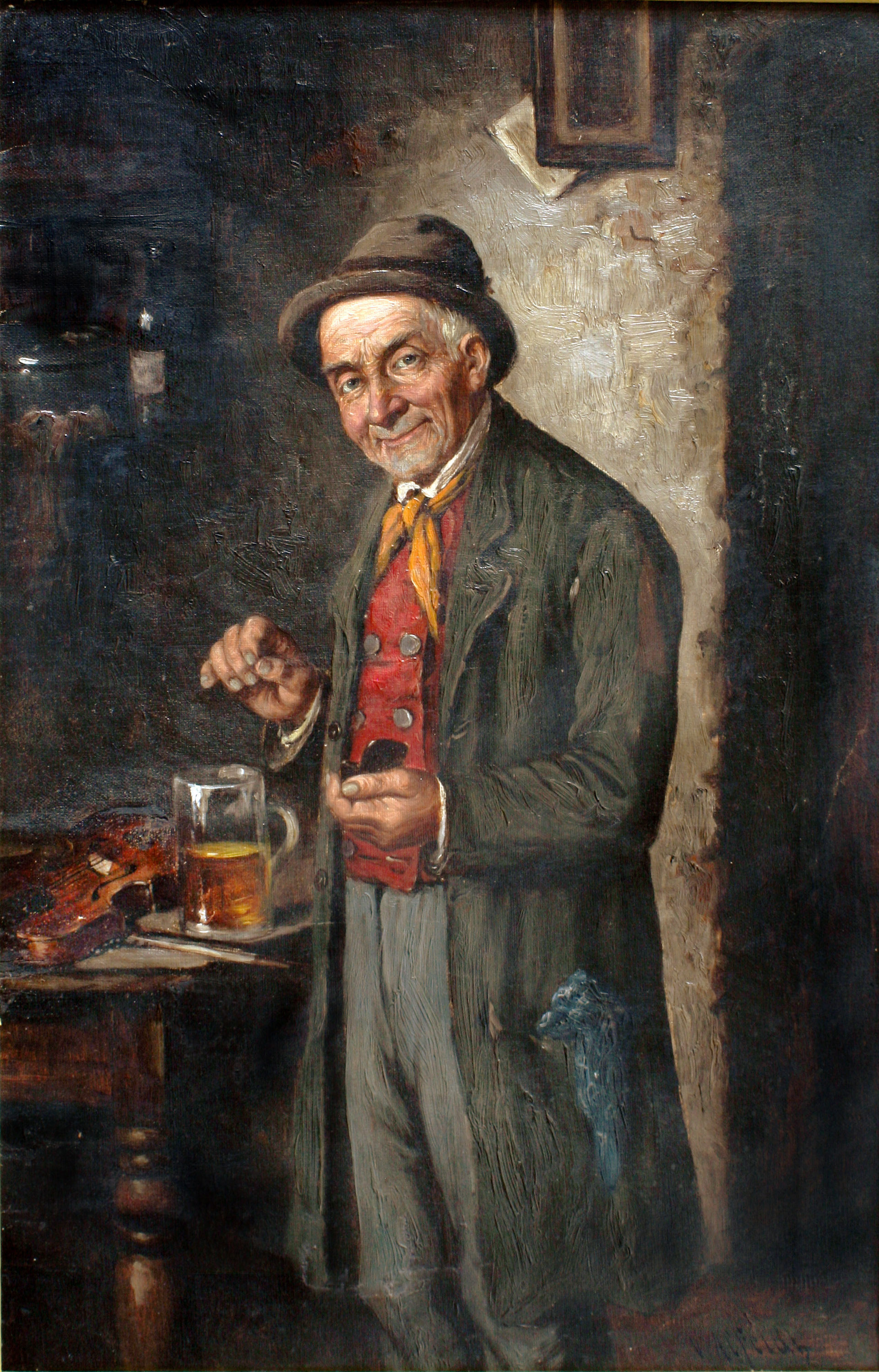
A man takes snuff from a box in a 19th-century painting.

The indigenous populations of Brazil were the first people known to have used ground tobacco as snuff. They would grind their tobacco leaves using a mortar and pestle made of rosewood, where the tobacco would also acquire a delicate aroma of the wood. The resulting snuff was then stored in airtight ornate bone bottles or tubes to preserve its flavor for later consumption.

Snuff-taking by the Taino and Carib people of the Lesser Antilles was observed by the Franciscan friar Ramón Pané on Columbus' second voyage to the New World in 1493. Pané returned to Spain with snuff, introducing it to Europe. Archaeological evidence from a precolonial site in eastern Puerto Rico dated to approximately A.D. 1150–1250 has identified starch grains from Anadenanthera peregrina seeds on a coral grinding artifact, providing direct evidence that hallucinogenic cohoba snuff was prepared in the Caribbean prior to European contact. Evidence from the same site also indicates that cohoba seeds were ground without prior roasting, suggesting variation in preparation techniques compared to those described in early historical accounts. Researchers have proposed that, in addition to ceremonial use, cohoba may have also been used in healing practices or as a stimulant in everyday contexts.

In the early 16th century, the Spanish Casa de Contratación (House of Trade) established and held a trade monopoly in the first manufacturing industries of snuff, in the city of Seville, which became Europe's first manufacturing and development centre for snuff. The Spanish called snuff polvo or rapé. At first they were independent production mills dispersed within the city; state control over the activity later concentrated the production to one location opposite the Church of San Pedro. By the mid-18th century it was decided to build a large and grand industrial building outside the city walls, and thus the Royal Tobacco Factory (Real Fábrica de Tabacos) was built, becoming Europe's first industrial tobacco factory and Spain's second largest building at the time. At first, it produced snuff and auctioned tobacco.

In 1561 Jean Nicot, the French ambassador in Lisbon, Portugal, who described tobacco's medicinal properties as a panacea in his writings, is credited with introducing ground tobacco snuff to the Royal Court of Catherine de' Medici to treat her persistent headaches. Catherine was so impressed with its curative relieving properties, she promptly declared the tobacco would henceforth be termed Herba Regina (Queen Herb). Her royal seal of approval would help popularize snuff among the French nobility.

The Dutch, who named the ground powdered tobacco "snuff" (snuif), were using the product by 1560. By the early 1600s, snuff had become an expensive luxury commodity. In 1611, commercially manufactured snuff made its way to North America by way of John Rolfe, the husband of Pocahontas, who introduced a sweeter Spanish variety of tobacco to North America. Though most of the colonists in America never fully accepted the English style of snuff use, American aristocrats used snuff. Snuff use in England increased in popularity after the Great Plague of London (1665–1666). People believed snuff had valuable medicinal properties, which added a powerful impetus to its consumption. By 1650, snuff use had spread from France to England, Scotland, and Ireland, and throughout Europe, as well as Japan, China, and Africa.

By the 17th century some prominent objectors to snuff-taking arose. Pope Urban VIII banned the use of snuff in churches and threatened to excommunicate snuff-takers. In Russia in 1643, Tsar Michael prohibited the sale of tobacco, instituted the punishment of removing the nose of those who used snuff, and declared that persistent users of tobacco would be killed. Despite this, use persisted elsewhere; King Louis XIII of France was a devout snuff-taker, whereas later, Louis XV banned the use of snuff from the Royal Court of France during his reign.

By the 18th century, snuff had become the tobacco product of choice among the elite. Snuff use reached a peak in England during the reign of Queen Anne (1702–14). It was during this time that England's own production of ready-made snuff blends started; home-made blending was common. Prominent snuff users included Pope Benedict XIII who repealed the smoking ban set by Pope Urban VIII; Queen Anne; King George III's wife Queen Charlotte, referred to as 'Snuffy Charlotte', who had an entire room at Windsor Castle devoted to her snuff stock; and King George IV, who had his own special blends and hoarded a stockpile of snuff. Napoleon, Lord Nelson, the Duke of Wellington, Marie Antoinette, Alexander Pope, Samuel Johnson, and Benjamin Disraeli all used snuff, as well as numerous other notable persons. The taking of snuff helped to distinguish the elite members of society from the common people, who generally smoked their tobacco.

It was also during the 18th century that an English author and botanist, John Hill, concluded nasal cancer could develop with the use of snuff. Under the guise of a doctor, he reported five cases of "polyps, a swelling in the nostril adherent with the symptoms of open cancer". In Victorian era Britain, a few miracle "snake oil" claims on the health or curative benefits of certain snuff types surfaced in publications. For instance, a London weekly journal called The Gentlewoman advised readers with ailing sight to use the correct type of Portuguese snuff, "whereby many eminent people had cured themselves so that they could read without spectacles after having used them for many years".

Snuff's image as an aristocratic luxury attracted the first U.S. federal tax on tobacco, created in 1794. Despite two centuries of pipe smoking and snuff use, by the mid-1850s, North Americans rejected European practices in general—especially British practices—that entailed snuff boxes and formality. By the late 1700s, taking snuff nasally had fallen out of fashion in the United States. Instead, dry snuff users would use a twig as a brush to "dip" the snuff, which then involved placing the snuff inside the cheek. This is seen as a precursor to dipping tobacco (moist snuff) use which is still popular today. In addition, orally chewing tobacco or dipping snuff was more convenient for Americans trekking westward in their wagons. During the 1800s until the mid-1930s, a communal snuff box was installed for members of the US Congress. American snuff is subject to the same warning labels on all smokeless tobacco, indicating a possibility of oral cancer and tooth loss. This reflects the fact that American dry snuff users may still use the product orally, unlike the majority of Europe, but nasal use of snuff is also practiced by some users. Dry snuff is typically not readily available outside the South and Appalachia, unlike its successor, dipping tobacco (moist snuff), which is available throughout the United States and is much more widely consumed.

In certain areas of Africa, some claim that snuff reached native Africans before white Europeans did, even though tobacco is not indigenous to Africa. A fictional representation of this is in Chinua Achebe's novel Things Fall Apart, where the Igbo villagers are regular snuff-takers long before they ever encountered the first British missionaries. In some African countries, such as South Africa and Nigeria, snuff is still quite popular with the older generation, though its use is slowly declining, with cigarette smoking becoming the dominant form of tobacco use. This includes parts of southern Ethiopia, where powdered tobaccos can be purchased at many larger markets across the Oromo region.

Around the time of the 2007 smoking ban in England, snuff had regained some degree of popularity.

== See also ==
- Anatomical snuffbox
- Jack and His Golden Snuff-Box, a fairy tale
- Snuff box
- Artisans
  - Adolf Frederick, King of Sweden
  - The Blarenberghe brothers
  - Rosalba Carriera
  - Daniel Macnee
  - Juste-Aurèle Meissonnier
  - George Michael Moser, 18th-century snuff-box maker
  - Airtight "Laurencekirk hinge"
- Creamy snuff
- Herbal smokeless tobacco (tobacco-free snuff, chewing, etc.)
- Snus
- Hallucinogenic snuff
