= Latakia (tobacco) =

Tobacco product

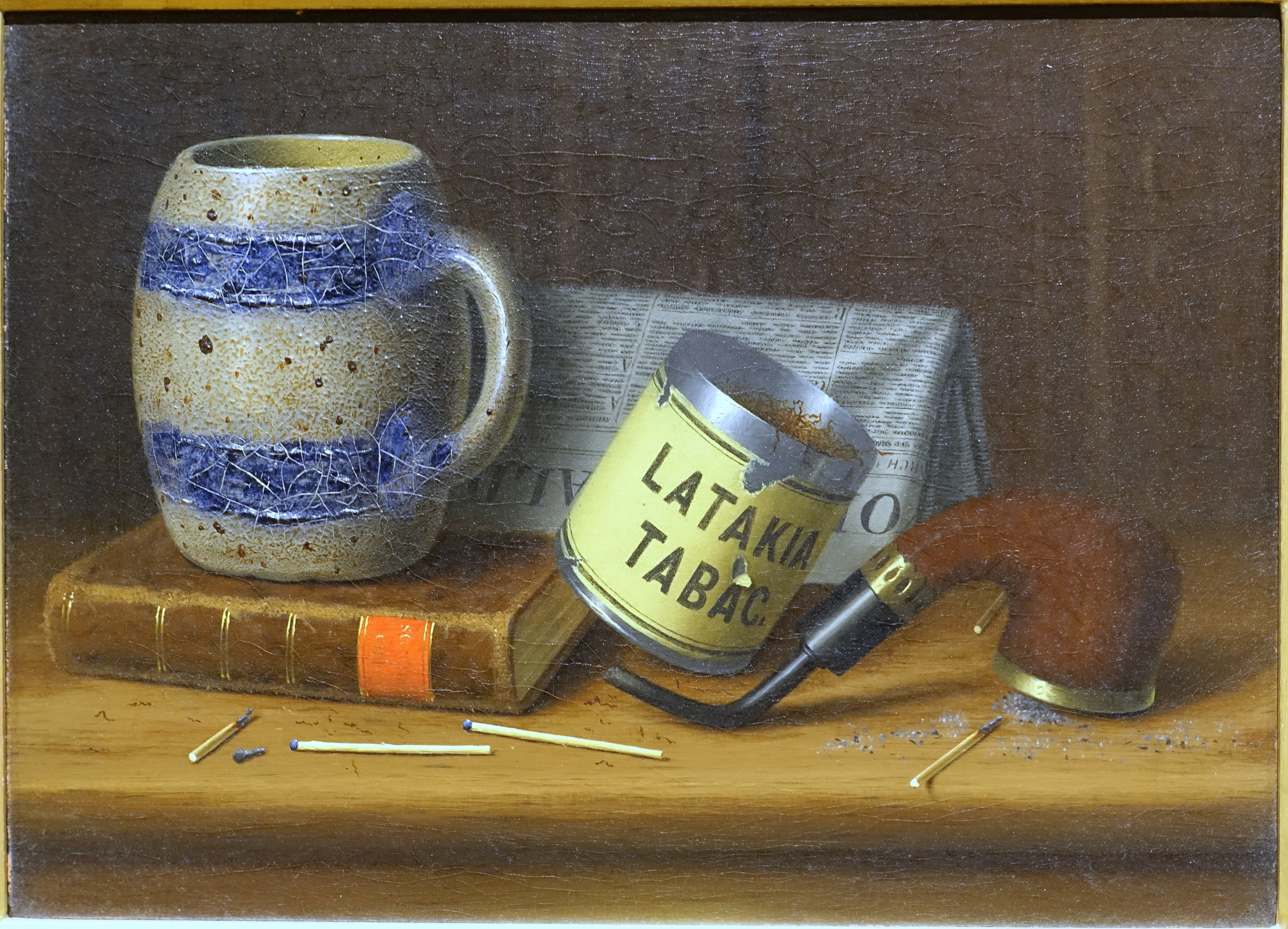
Latakia II by William Michael Harnett, c. 1880

Latakia tobacco (Arabic: تبغ اللاذقية) is a sun-dried and smoke-cured tobacco product. It originated in Syria and is named after Syria's major port city of Latakia, though large-scale production has permanently moved to Cyprus due to varying and compounding sociopolitical issues within Syrian borders. It is in the family of fire-cured tobaccos in which the leaves are dried (cured) over burning hardwood. The process that sets Latakia apart from other fire-cured tobaccos involves the use of heavy volumes of smoke from both dried and live material from aromatic woods.

Latakia was potentially discovered by accident when a bumper crop resulted in surplus tobacco; the farmers stored the excess tobacco in the rafters of their home, which at the time was an effective way of preservation as the smoke from the open wood fires used for heat and light would slowly dry and cure food over time. This process of moderate-temperature smoke-curing is one of the defining factors of Latakia's complex aroma.

When Latakia is burned, it has a characteristic wood-smoke aroma accompanied by floral sweet undertones. Latakia is traditionally found within pipe-tobacco blends, although some specialist cigar and cigarette producers use it as well. The majority of pipe blends that contain Latakia use it as a condiment, a tobacco that does not represent the majority of the blend but is instead used to add complexity and to control its burn rate.

== Overview of Oriental tobacco ==
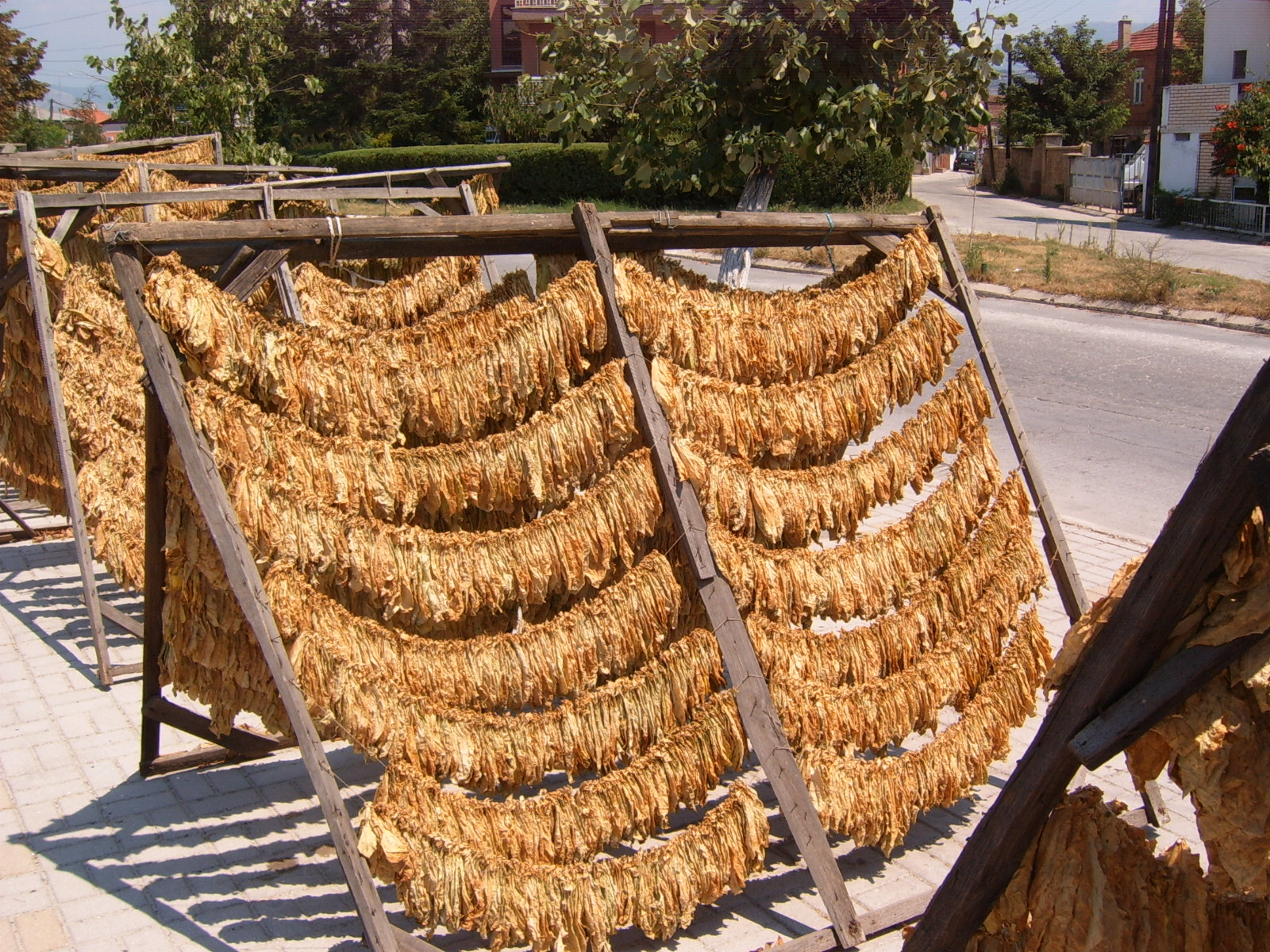
Oriental tobacco being sun-cured

Tobacco grown within the arid desert climate of the Middle East and Mediterranean is known in the tobacco industry as Oriental tobacco. Compared to the tobacco plant most commonly grown in the Western world (Nicotiana tabacum) which is 6 feet (1.8 m) on average and has up to 24 forearm-sized leaves, Oriental tobacco plants consists of Nicotiana rustica which are roughly 2 feet (0.61 m) to 3 feet (0.91 m) in height with up to 100 palm-sized to hand-sized leaves, as well as Nicotiana tabacum; though the climate tends to produce smaller sized plants of approximately 4 feet (1.2 m) to 5 feet (1.5 m) in height. Historically, both Syrian and Cyprian Latakia use varieties of N. tabacum and N. rustica, though many modern commercial producers use Nicotiana tabacum.

== Syrian Latakia ==
There are many debates on the specific type of tobacco seed or variety used to produce Syrian Latakia and there is little data as manufacturers at the time either did not keep record or they were purposely destroyed by the company. As early as the late 19th century, there were accounts of Nicotiana rustica; "The flowers are yellow, and number only a few in comparison with most varieties. When growing, the leaves are thick, but after curing are thin and elastic. The stalk is small, as are also the leaves. While growing, the plants emit a strong aromatic odor not like that of Havana tobacco, but stronger and less agreeable". While in the early 20th century, sources argue for a state of misidentification and Nicotiana Tobacum to be the true variety. Moreover, there is a physical difference in the same varieties grown within farms at higher elevation in the hills as opposed to lower elevations in the plains; with the latter producing larger plants than the former. With The decrease and eventual cease of production within Syrian borders, it is difficult to say for certain that one seed is valued more than another. Regardless of what varieties were used during the end of its production in Syria, there is a common consensus that Latakia was first produced using a variety of Nicotiana tabacum called shekk-el-bint (a variety with narrow leaves with a length of 10 inches (250 mm) to 12 inches (300 mm)), or the Turkish Yayladag variant as the original.

The sun-curing process differs from normal Oriental production as the leaves are not stitched together. The leaves remain on the stalk of the plant and are kept whole, including the flowers. They are then either hung between trees or simply laid on the ground to dry over a period of three or more weeks. From there, they are moved to store houses before being purchased by brokers to finish the smoke-curing process, sometimes called fumigation.

Fumigation is carried out in the mountains of Syria inside of simple barns (akin to a smoke house) made of brick or block with earthen floors and no ventilation. The tobacco is hung inside on rafters and fumigated using one or two firepits dug into the ground. There is more debate on which species of woods and brushes are used for this process (though carob, scrub oak, Aleppo pine, Turkey oak, Valonia oak, and Lebanon cedar are commonly found near the barns). From accounts in the early 19th century, Quercus ilex or holm/holly oak was used. It is also commonly thought by Western tobacco blenders that some processors use a variety of material found growing near the barns and do not make a particular recipe or blend. Smaller branches, twigs, and leaves are used, instead of large pieces of hardwood. Once fumigation is completed, the rough Latakia is re-hydrated, bulk packaged, and sent to the port of Latakia. the process of fumigation and later hydration increases bulk weight by ~15%.

Once in the hands of processors such as the Imperial Tobacco Company, the tobacco grown in the plains is de-stalked and bulked together with the tobacco grown in the Mountains; the latter retaining its stalk and flowers. The leaves are then further bulked and placed into large vaults for up to 90 days. During this process, the tobacco undergoes fermentation (a common practice amongst tobacco processors throughout the world). This process eliminates/reduces water content, many harsh chemicals (such as nicotine), and produces new and more complex flavor compounds. After fermentation, the tobacco is placed in frames to be exported. This is usually done in the winter to prevent further fermentation. This increases the difficulty of seed variety identification as plants are mixed together during bulking and fermentation, making it near impossible to distinguish between flavor characteristics and leaf structure of one variety over another.

The taste and aroma of Syrian Latakia is considered mild, floral, spiced, and with wood smoke and tart flavors similar to wine. Within blends, it is typically added to a smoking mixture at less than 15%. Blenders suggest that the smoky acridness and tang becomes more prominent when in percentages of 35% or more.

Charles Dickens spoke on Syrian Latakia and the current ruler of Syria at the time, stating, "the best Syrian tobacco, generally allowed to be superior to all others, is the Latakia, produced in the neighborhood of the city of that name, the ancient and renowned port of Laodicea, and which to be the present day, has a not inconsiderable trade. It lies at the foot of Mount Lebanon, not far from the spot where the remnants of the patriarchal cedars still grow in great abundance than in any other part of the mountains, though the abundance has not curtailed by the destroying visitations of time. And as Syria provides the finest tobacco in the world, the prince of Syria, the Emir Bekir, had the reputation, and most deservedly, of furnishing to his guest a pipe far more complete than any which could be furnished by any rival potentate in the east".

Latakia is commonly referred to as Abourihm or "King of Flavor".

== Cyprian Latakia ==
Cyprian Latakia differs from Syrian Latakia in several fundamental ways: The process of sun-curing, the type of material used for fumigation, details during and after fumigation, and if the processor intends to go through fermentation.

Much like with Syrian Latakia, there is much confusion and debate on the particular varieties of tobacco used within Cyprus. Reports from the early 1950's states that non-fumigated Yellow leaf tobacco (possibly from N. rustica), Latakia (fumigated) tobacco, and non-fumigated Virginia tobacco were grown and exported during this time. Moreover, there are accounts from the late 19th century suggesting that Syria was growing both N. rustica and N. tabacum; "On most varieties the color of the flowers is pink excepting Syrian or Latakia which bears yellow flowers while those of Shiraz or Persian and Guatemala are white while those of the Japan tobacco, are purple", "A field of Latakia tobacco presents a novel appearance, the short straight plants with their ovate leaves bearing yellow blossoms form a striking contrast to towering seed leaf rising fully two or three feet higher than the Syrian plant". Noting Syrian Latakia and Persian tobacco in particular interest and their Flower colors, N. rustica exhibits yellow flowers and N. tabacum exhibiting white, pink, and purple flowers. This may suggest they were growing a variety of Smyrna Yellow, though descriptions from the same accounts may suggest Samsun, Bafra, Trebizond, or Soukoum. When the eventual transfer of production was made from Syria to Cyprus, N. rustica may have been transferred along with N. tabacum. Furthermore, the growing of Oriental crops for cigarette production also places N. rustica firmly in Cyprian soil.

During the harvesting season and when the leaves have ripened, the plant is cut from the top first into three pieces called "strings", each about 9 inches (230 mm) long. The leaves are not removed from the stalk. The loose leaves harvested from lower portions of the plants are intermingled with the stalky pieces. The "strings" are then either hung on frames for curing (as is done in Syria) or the method more commonly adopted in Cyprus is to lay them on the ground for sun-curing. the farmers keep turning them for several days until the curing is completed; this generally lasts about 18 to 20 days. Though this is common in Cyprus, there does not seem to be as complete of a cure as the Syrian method due to accounts of green coloring fixed to the cured leaves and the note of good tobacco only coming from fields that are not irrigated.

Cyprian Latakia is fumigated in the same way as Syrian Latakia and it is from here that there is a more complete description of the fumigation barns: "The dimensions of an averaged size but are: 22 feet (6.7 m) length, 14 feet (4.3 m) breadth, and 15 feet (4.6 m) height with one or two firepits in the middle part. The firepit is approximately 3 feet (0.91 m) by 3 feet (0.91 m) by 6 feet (1.8 m) in size and is covered with a raised zinc cover to prevent the lower rows catching fire". The process continues in the same fashion as it does in Syria with the added task of using different woods at different times of fumigation. Firing first occurs for a few days with slightly aromatic material like myrtle followed by heavier volumes of hard wood, such as pine or oak, for the purpose of producing a considerable heat in order to dry out the leaf. Afterwards the process is continued until near completion with mixed live material to produce denser smoke. For the last few days, more aromatic bushes may be added to finalize its flavor. The process in its entirety takes roughly 20–30 days and the tobacco is removed from bottom to top as they dry. The same accounts note the use of sawdust in lower quality manufacturers. Helmut Fischer of the British-American Tobacco Company in July 1964 gave a list of woods used in Cyprus including percentages as follows:

Mastic - Pistacia centiscus: 90%

Myrtle - Myrtus communis romana: 4%

Stone pine - Pinus pinea pinus pinaster: 4%

Cypress tree - Cypressus sempervirens: 1%

Konison- ? : 1%

Fermentation in Cyprian Latakia is not a prerequisite for manufacturing. After fumigation, the tobacco is bulked into pieces weighing 10,000 pounds (4,500 kg) to 30,000 pounds (14,000 kg) and allowed to condition and reach peak dryness. Due the fact that Latakia requires larger bulking (up to 80,000 pounds (36,000 kg)) in order to have a proper fermentation, manufacturers prefer to bypass this step as it requires more labor to continuously monitor temperatures within the large pile and may lead to spontaneous combustion. The final product is dark, almost black in color, obtains a flexible leather-like texture, and emits an intense aroma. From there, it is packaged and sent to producers of tobacco products.

The aroma profile of Cyprian Latakia is more assertive than that of Syrian Latakia with sweeter notes of leather and smoke. The use of cedar and mastic enhance the floral tones.

== Decline of Syrian Latakia ==
Since the mid-19th century, the Syrian forest has seen gradual destruction. The construction of the Baghdad and Hedjaz railways created a large need for firewood as the locomotives were still powered with wood rather than coal. During the First World War, large areas were used for fuel. This coupled with overharvesting, the ravages of the Second World War, and then later with the tobacco industry led to local government restrictions set in place to promote restoration.

Syrian Tobacco has also had a history of a destructive blue mold (Peronospora hyoscyami f.sp. tabacina). In 1963 alone, blue mold reduced the production of all tobacco products from 17 million pounds to 2.5 million pounds.

The Arab Republic of Syria has had several conflicts since its independence and this has caused the availability of Latakia tobacco to fluctuate, finally leading to its discontinuation of exports in 2010 reaching only $3.27 million exported compared to $8 million in 2008. There is not one event that has caused its demise but a mixture of conflict, regulations and politics, and recent sanctions placed on Syria during its civil war. While there is tobacco still being produced in Syria today, and may be on the rise again, none is meant for Latakia production or exportation

== Use in tobacco blends ==
Latakia is primarily used in making pipe tobacco blends. Of the many categories of blends found throughout the world, the most prominent use of Latakia are in those of the English and Balkan pipe tobacco varieties. This is so much so that to be considered an English or balkan mixture, a blend must contain some percentage of Latakia tobacco. English pipe mixtures became famous for the distinct flavor of Latakia, due to its rarity outside of the Middle East. Because the British Empire had interests within Syria and the surrounding areas, the import of Latakia as well as other Oriental tobaccos to the British Isles were commonplace, but not much elsewhere in Western Europe and the Americas. Because of this, many pipe smokers outside of the British Empire (and even within, as many blenders kept their recipes secret) historically knew only of Latakia through the unique taste and smell of the blends they purchased from English merchants. The basis of English and Balkan blends is a combination of Virginia tobacco or Burley tobacco either by themselves or blended together. Latakia and other Oriental tobaccos (Balkan blends tending to have a higher more prominent usage of Orientals) are added to finish the mixture.

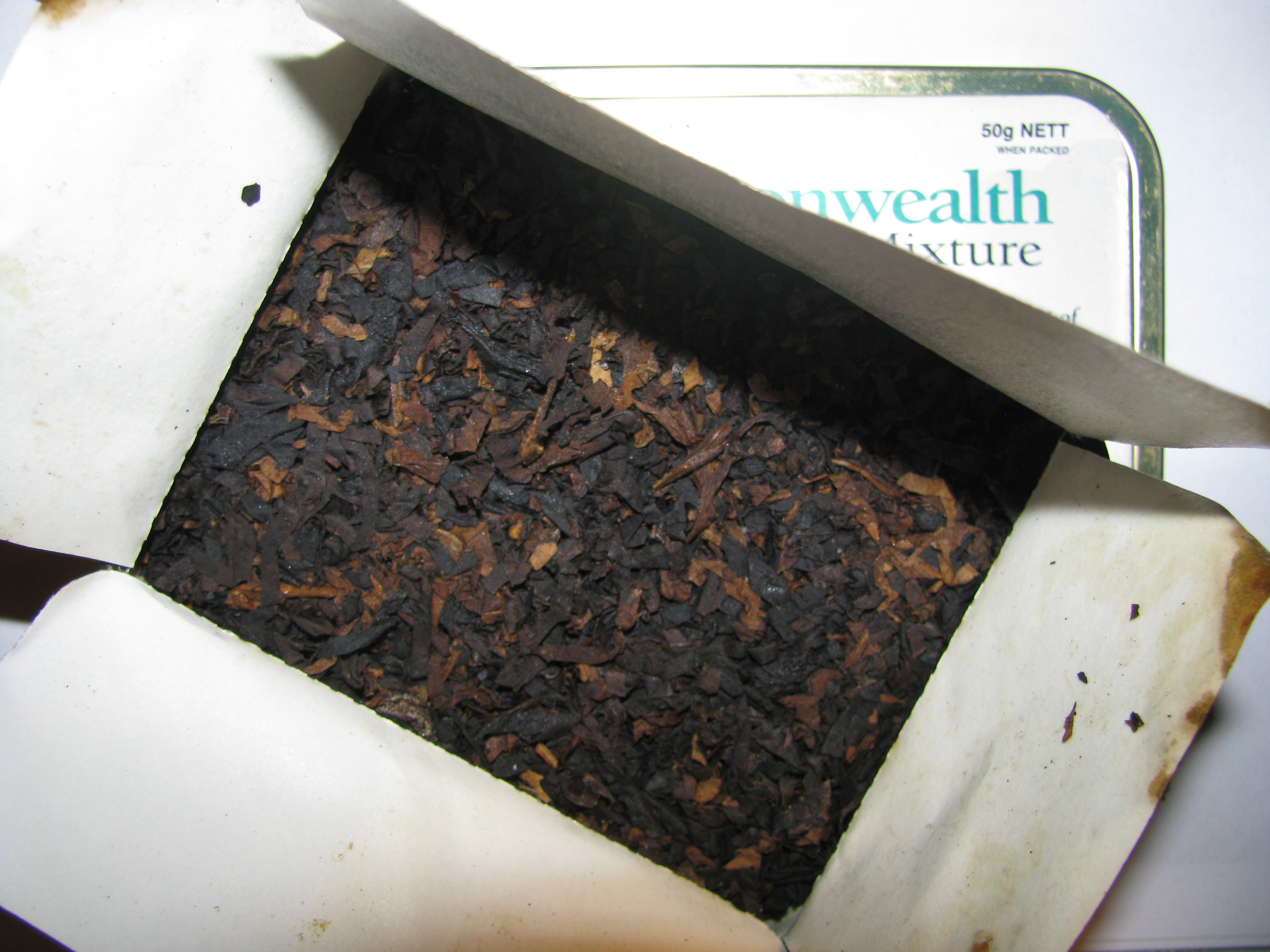
Tobacco with latakia

Since the resurgence in pipe smoking in the late 1990's and the increase in popularity of non-traditional blends and flavors, Latakia has taken on many new roles. Many blenders use Latakia in conjunction with warm flavors such as chocolate or vanilla in aromatic blends (tobacco blends consisting of any mixture of tobacco with added natural or artificial flavors) to highlight key notes the blender is looking for. Furthermore, Latakia is no longer relegated to being a condiment tobacco. Modern blenders have made successful recipes consisting of up to 50% Latakia, though generally regarded as robust blends and not for those who are looking for a lighter flavor. Moreover, Latakia has been used by companies such as Drew Estate Cigars in many of their non-traditional naturally-flavored cigars.

== See also ==
- Types of tobacco
