= Turkish tobacco =

Variety of tobacco

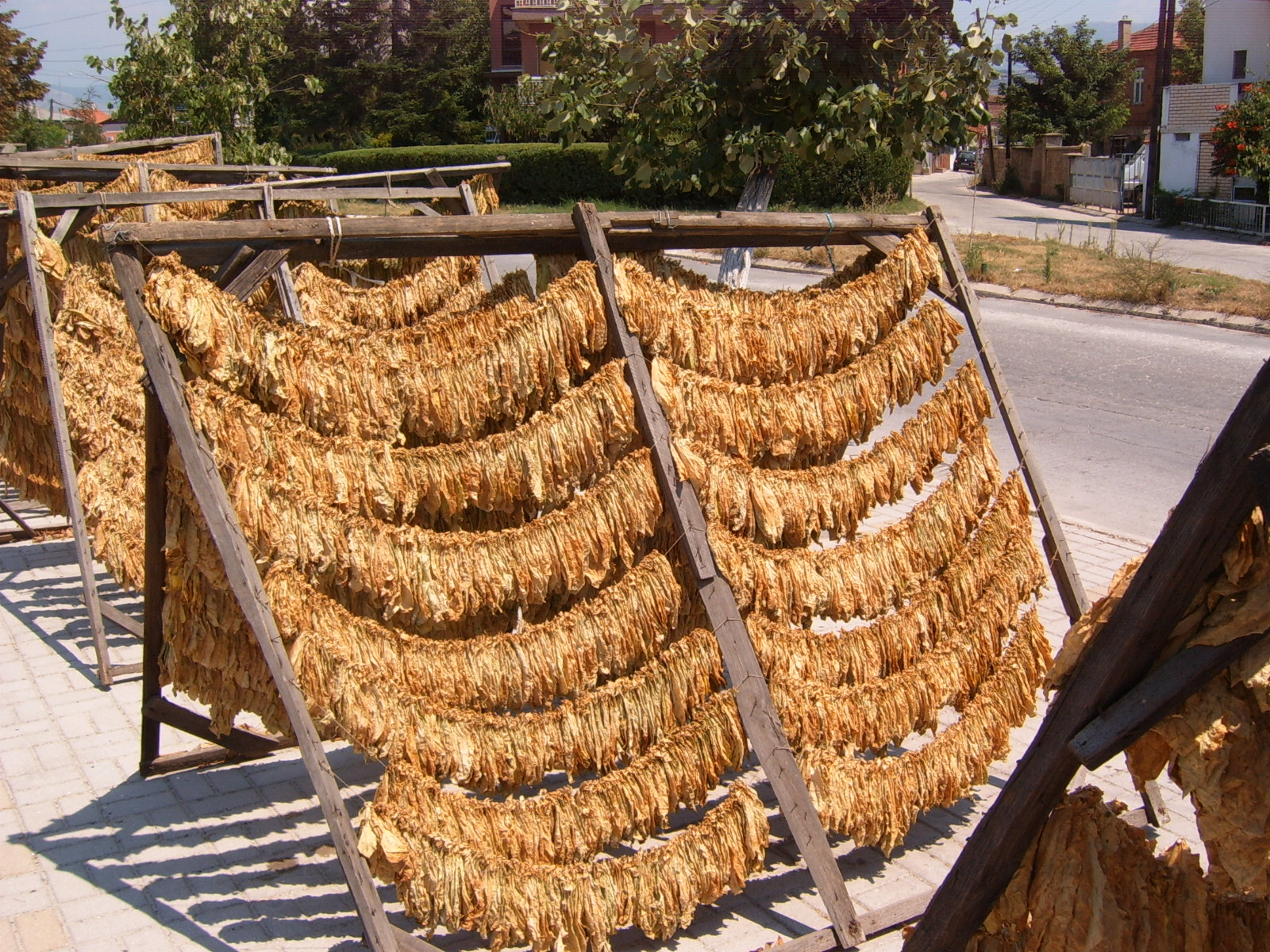
Drying of tobacco on the streets of Prilep, North Macedonia

Turkish tobacco is a small-leafed variety of tobacco. Its plants usually have a greater number and smaller size of leaves than American tobacco, and are typically sun-cured. These differences can be attributed to climate, soil, cultivation, and treatment methods. Historically, it was cultivated primarily in Thrace and Macedonia, which are now divided among Bulgaria, Greece, North Macedonia, and Turkey; but, it is now also grown on the Black Sea coast of Turkey, in Egypt, in South Africa, and elsewhere.

The name "Turkish" refers to the Ottoman Empire, which ruled the historic production areas until the late 19th and early 20th centuries. The term Oriental tobacco has also been used for the leaf.

== History ==
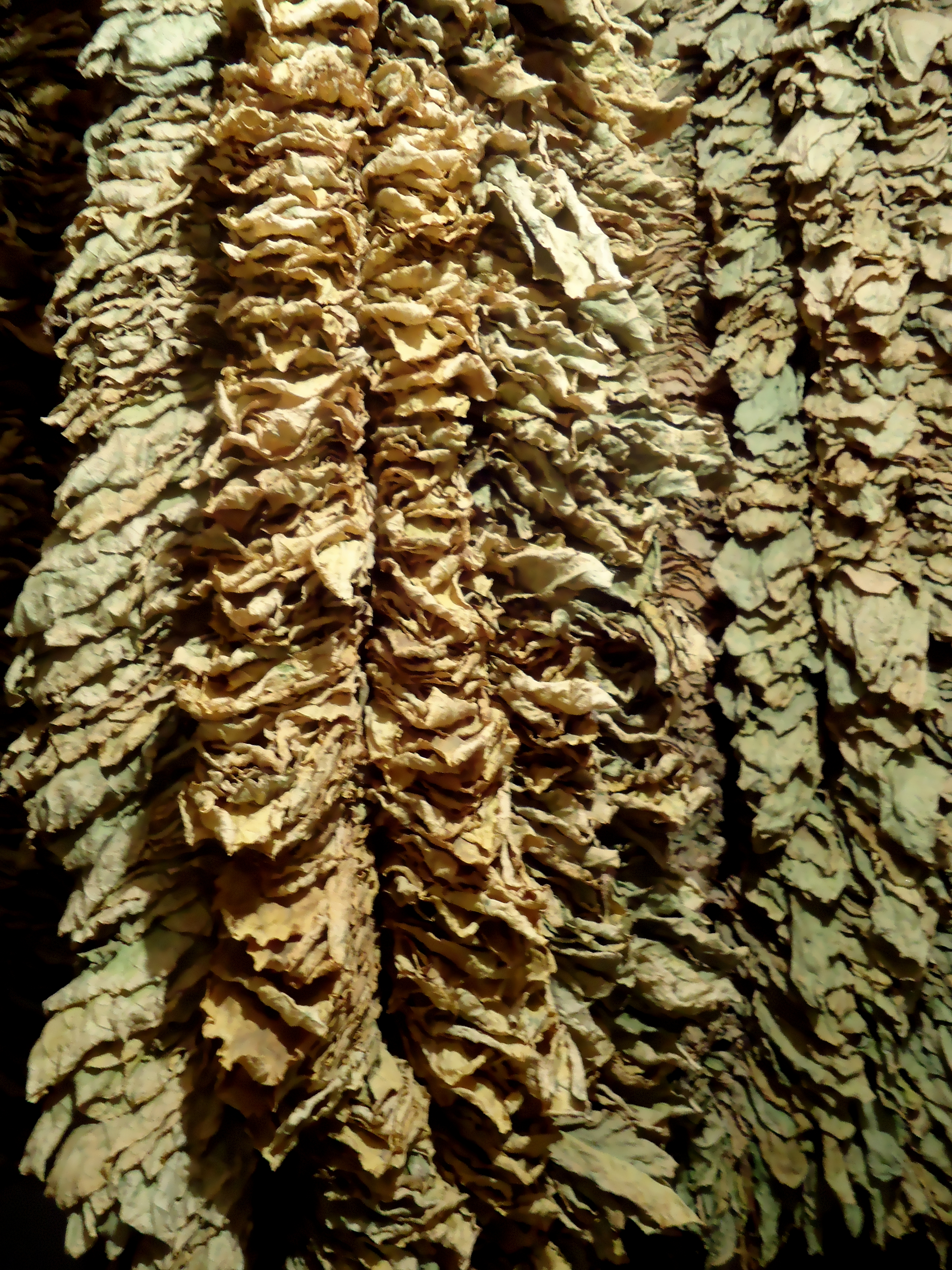
Stacks of dried Turkish tobacco in Prilep, North Macedonia

Tobacco originated in the Americas and was initially introduced as a medicinal plant to the Ottoman Turks by the Spanish. The Ottoman people over time developed their own method of growing and using tobacco.

Many of the early Ottoman brands of cigarettes were made mostly or entirely of Turkish tobacco; today, its main use is in blends of pipe and especially cigarette tobacco, for which it is suited.

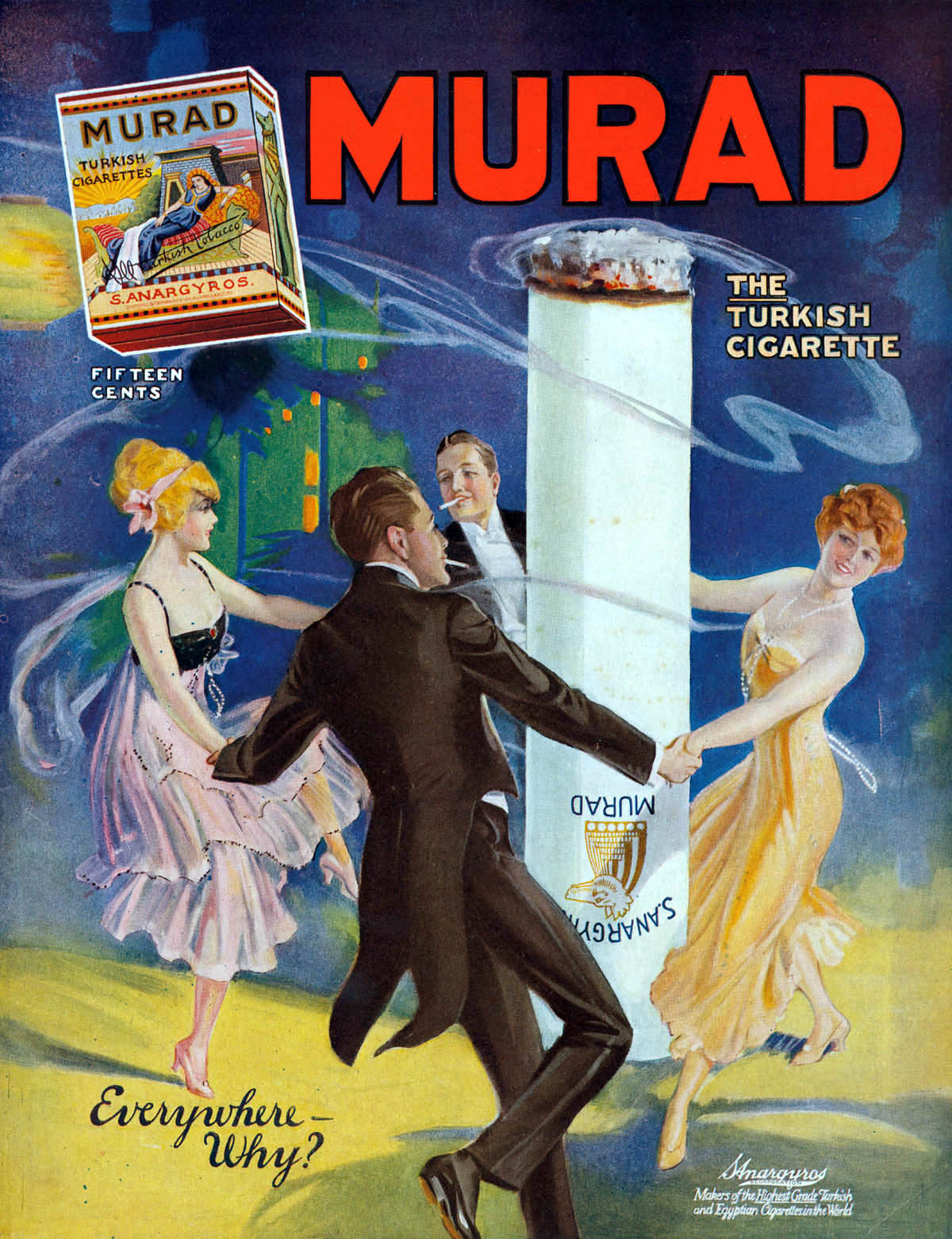
Ad for Murad cigarettes by Rea Irvin, 1916

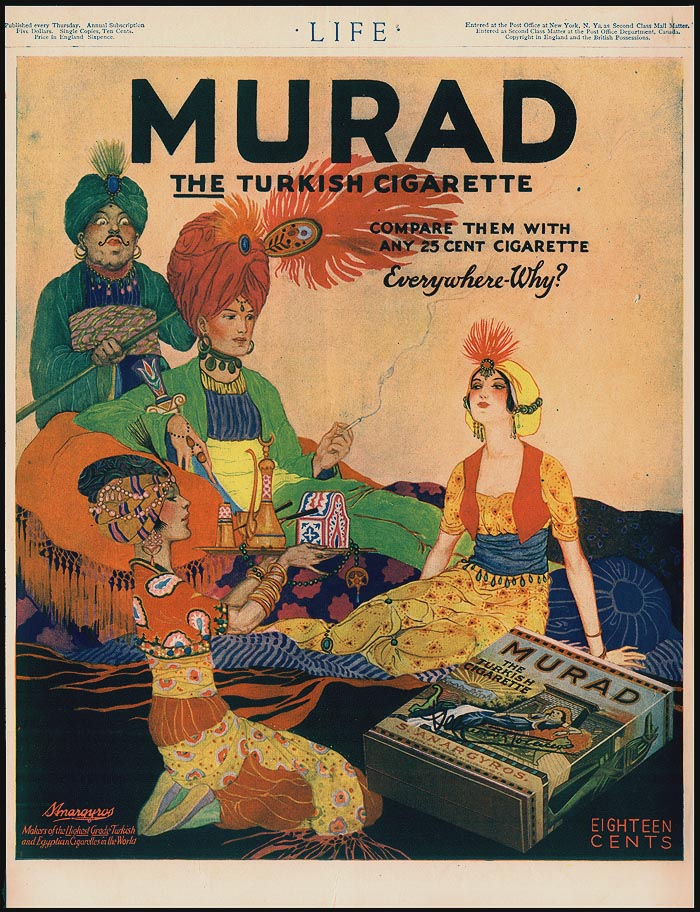
Murad ad by Rea Irvin in 1918

In the early 1900s, manufacturers of Turkish and Egyptian cigarettes tripled their sales and became legitimate competitors to leading brands. The New York-based Greek tobacconist Soterios Anargyros produced the hand-rolled Murad cigarettes, made of pure Turkish tobacco. One of the most unusual advertising campaigns for any cigarette was the long-running series for Murad made by Rea Irvin.

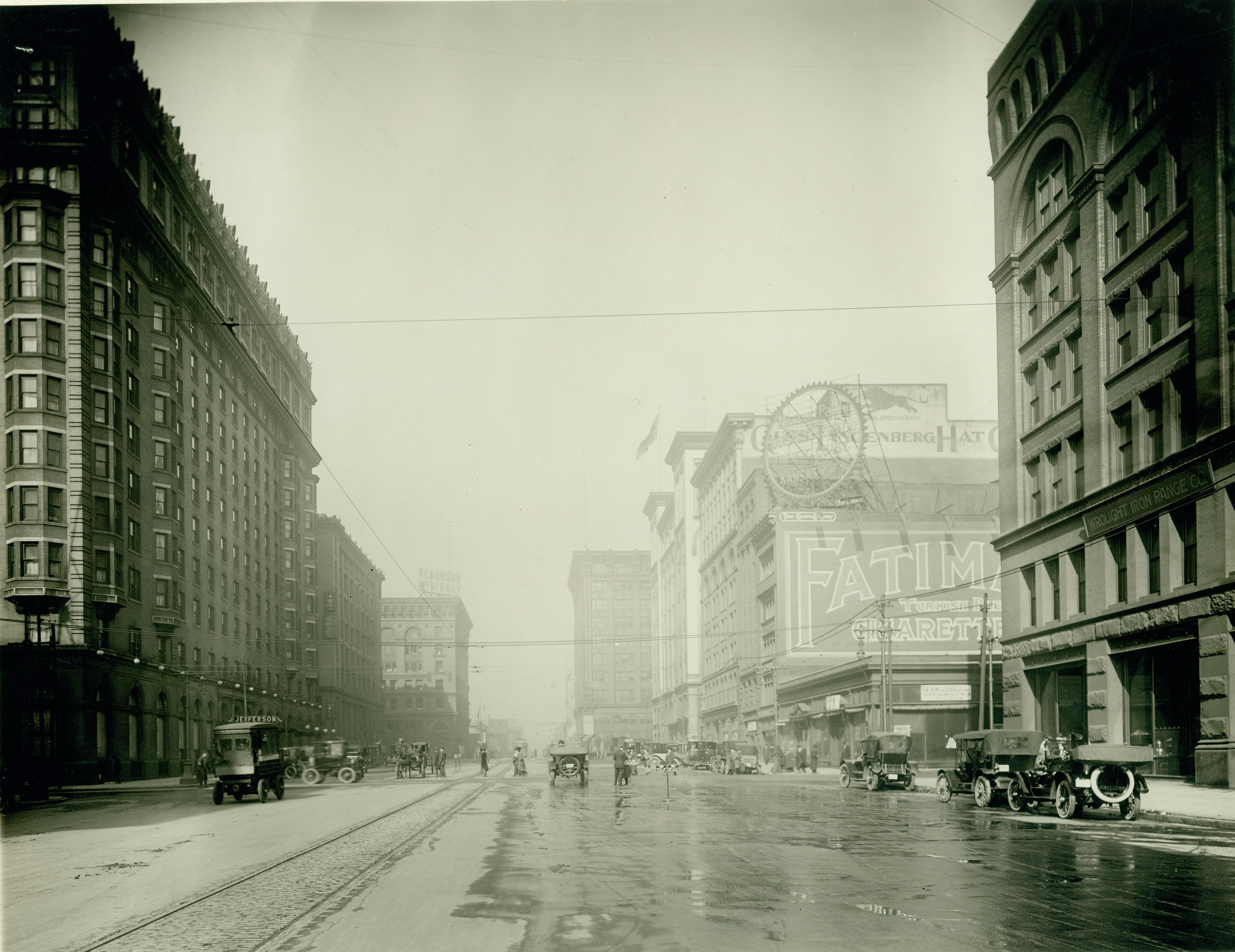
Fatima Cigarettes ad in St. Louis, Missouri, around 1914

Tastes in Europe and the United States shifted away from Turkish tobacco and toward Virginia tobacco, during and after the First World War.

Cigarettes containing Turkish tobacco (which includes those varieties grown in what is now Greece) exclusively continued to be manufactured and sold as "Turkish cigarettes" in the US (brands Murad, Helmar, Fatima, and others), in the UK (Sullivan & Powell, Benson & Hedges, Fribourg & Treyer, Balkan Sobranie), and Germany (where the so-called "Orientzigaretten" had the major market share before the Second World War).

They are not available anymore, with many brands, like Murad, having simply disappeared.

== Turkish tobacco in American blends ==
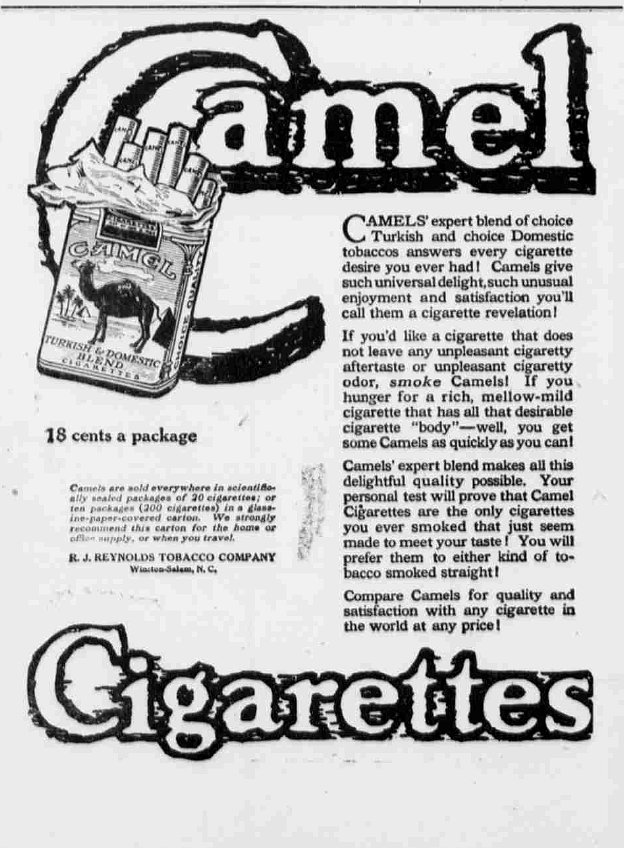
R.J. Reynolds' new "Turkish blend" cigarette

Turkish tobacco was introduced to American cigarettes in 1913 by the Camel brand, blended with Virginia and Burley tobacco leaves.

Today, it remains a key ingredient in American blend cigarettes. Demand remains high; however, the capacity to grow it remains limited, resulting in it being one of the most expensive types of tobacco in cigarette blends.

== See also ==
- Camel (cigarettes)
- Types of tobacco
- Egyptian cigarette industry
- Latakia (tobacco)
