= Taliq Bridge =

Cultural heritage monument of Kosovo

- Ura e Taliqit (Albanian)
- Interactive map of Taliq Bridge
- Location: Gjakova, Kosovo

History
- Built: 1816

The Taliq Bridge is a cultural heritage monument in Gjakova, Kosovo.

The bridge lies on the southern edge of the Great Çarshia and crosses the Krena River. A wall inscription dates construction to 1816, when it was built by the Tabakëve (Turkish tobacco merchants’ guild) in their eponymous Tabak neighborhood. The carved stone arch bridge includes one large arch and two smaller vaults near the banks. An auxiliary window opens between the vaults. Originally more symmetrical than it is today, the bridge remains in good condition and accommodates pedestrians across its length of 26 metres (85 ft) and width of 4.05 metres (13.3 ft).
