= Types of tobacco =

This article contains a list of tobacco cultivars and varieties, as well as unique preparations of the tobacco leaf involving particular methods of processing the plant (e.g. cavendish tobacco).

== Types ==
The U.S. Department of Agriculture classifies leaf tobacco into 9 different classes.

Flue-cured types, Air-cured types, Miscellaneous domestic types, Foreign-grown cigar-leaf types, Fire-cured types, Cigar-filler types, Cigar-wrapper types, Cigar-binder types, and Foreign-grown types, other than for cigar types.

=== Additive-free tobacco ===
==== Dokha ====
Dokha is tobacco originally grown in the UAE, Iran, and other gulf states. Traditional dokha is 100% additive-free tobacco. Dokha is Arabic for dizzy, which refers to the extremely high nicotine content of dokha. Dokha is not cured like many other commercial tobacco products and is minimally processed. The green leaves are dried and shredded into small flakes which are smoked through a pipe called a medwakh.

=== Tobacco with additives ===
==== Aromatic fire-cured ====
Prior to the American Civil War, the tobacco type mostly grown in the US was fire-cured, dark leaf. This type of tobacco was planted in fertile lowlands, used a robust variety of leaf, and was either fire cured, or air cured. Aromatic fire-cured smoking tobacco is dark leaf, a robust variety of tobacco used as a condimental for pipe blends. It is cured by smoking over gentle fires. In the United States, it is grown in northern middle Tennessee, western Kentucky, and Virginia. Fire-cured tobacco grown in Kentucky and Tennessee is used in some chewing tobaccos, moist snuff, some cigarettes, and as a condiment leaf in pipe tobacco blends. It has a rich, slightly floral taste, and adds body and aroma to the blend.

See also Latakia.

==== Mu‘assel ====
Muʽassel (Arabic: معسل, meaning "honeyed"), or maassel, is a syrupy tobacco mix containing molasses, vegetable glycerol, and various flavorings that is smoked in a hookah, a type of waterpipe. It is also known as shisha.

=== Not sorted under additive or additive section yet ===
==== Bright leaf tobacco ====
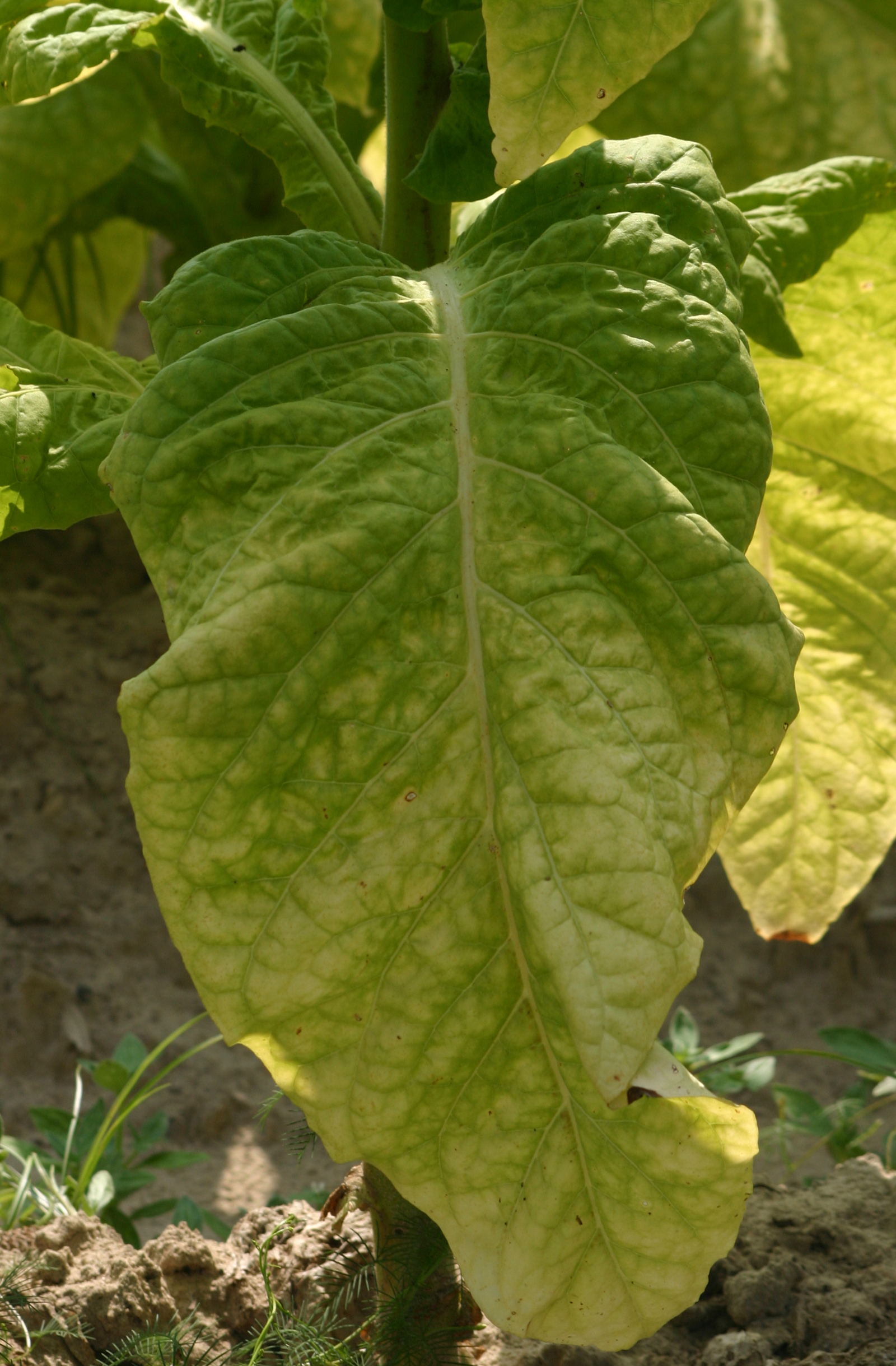
Bright leaf tobacco leaf ready for harvest: When it turns yellow-green, the sugar content is at its peak, and it will cure to a deep golden color with a mild taste. The leaves are harvested progressively up the stem from the base, as they ripen.

Sometime after the War of 1812, demand for a milder, lighter, more aromatic tobacco arose. Ohio, Pennsylvania, and Maryland all innovated with milder varieties of the tobacco plant. Farmers around the country experimented with different curing processes, but the breakthrough did not come until around 1839.

Growers had noticed that sandy, highland soil produced thinner, weaker plants. Captain Abisha Slade, of Caswell County, North Carolina, had considerable infertile, sandy soil, and planted the new "gold leaf" varieties on it.

Slade owned an enslaved man named Stephen, who around 1839 accidentally produced the first true bright leaf tobacco. He used charcoal to restart a fire used to cure the crop. The surge of heat turned the leaves yellow. Using that discovery, Slade developed a system for producing bright leaf tobacco, cultivated on poorer soils and using charcoal for heat-curing.

Slade made many public appearances to share the bright-leaf process with other farmers. News spread through the area quickly. The infertile sandy soil of the Appalachian piedmont was suddenly profitable, and people rapidly developed flue-curing techniques, a more efficient way of smoke-free curing.

Farmers discovered that bright leaf tobacco needs thin, starved soil, and those who could not grow other crops found that they could grow tobacco. Formerly unproductive farms reached 20–35 times their previous worth. By 1855, six Piedmont counties adjoining Virginia led Virginia's tobacco market.

By the outbreak of the Civil War, the town of Danville, Virginia, had developed a bright-leaf market for the surrounding area. Danville was also the main railway head for Confederate soldiers going to the front. They brought bright leaf tobacco with them from Danville to the lines, traded it with each other and Union soldiers. At the end of the war, the soldiers went home, and a national market had developed for the local crop.

Slade's success enabled him to own many properties in Yanceyville. After the Civil War and the emancipation of his enslaved workers, Slade's plantation became unprofitable to operate, and he died in poverty.

==== Broadleaf ====
Broadleaf is a dark tobacco varietal family popular for producing enormous, resilient, and thick wrapper leaves.

==== Burley ====
The origin of white burley tobacco was credited to Mr. George Webb in 1864, who grew it near Higginsport, Ohio, from seed from Bracken County, Kentucky. He noticed it yielded a different type of light leaf shaded from white to yellow, and cured differently. By 1866, he harvested 20,000 pounds (9,100 kg) of burley tobacco and sold it in 1867 at the St. Louis Fair for $58 per hundred pounds ($1.28/kg). By 1883, the principal market for this tobacco was Cincinnati, but it was grown throughout central Kentucky and Middle Tennessee. In 1880, Kentucky produced 36% of the total national tobacco production, and was first in the country, with nearly twice as much tobacco produced as by Virginia, then the second-place state.

Burley tobacco is a light, air-cured tobacco used primarily for cigarette production. In the United States, it is produced in an eight-state belt with about 70% produced in Kentucky. Tennessee produces around 20%, with smaller amounts produced in Indiana, North Carolina, Missouri, Ohio, Virginia, and West Virginia. Burley tobacco is produced in many other countries, with major production in Brazil, Malawi, and Argentina. In the U.S., burley tobacco plants are started from pelletized seeds placed in polystyrene trays floated on a bed of fertilized water in March or April.

Since Burley is dried naturally at a low temperature it allows the plant to breathe and continue to process sugars which reduces the amount of sugar in the cured leaves. Burley is defined as Type 31-V by the U. S. Department of Agriculture.

==== Corojo ====
Corojo is a type of tobacco used primarily in the making of cigars, originally grown in the Vuelta Abajo region of Cuba. Corojo was originally developed and grown by Diego Rodriguez at his farm or vega, Santa Ines del Corojo. It was used as a wrapper extensively for many years on Cuban cigars, but its susceptibility to various diseases, blue mold in particular, caused Cuban genetic engineers to develop various hybrid forms that would not only be disease-resistant, but also display excellent wrapper qualities such as: Honduran 'Corojo', 'Habano 2000', Mexican 'San Andrés Corojo', and other hybrids.

==== Criollo ====
Criollo also is primarily used in the making of cigars. It was, by most accounts, one of the original Cuban tobaccos that emerged around the time of Columbus. The term means "native seed", thus a tobacco variety using the term, such as Dominican criollo, may or may not have anything to do with the original Cuban seed nor the recent hybrid, 'Criollo '98'.

==== Ecuadorian Sumatra ====
Jose Aray Marin, the founder of the Don Cervantes factory, developed the world-famous Ecuadorian 'Sumatra' breed in 1967. It is now considered the world's premium cigar-wrapper leaf and is in demand by cigar manufacturers worldwide.

==== Green River ====
Green River is a type of air-cured tobacco. It is also known as Dark Air-cured of the Henderson and Owensboro Districts or Green River Air-cured and is produced mainly in the Kentucky Green River area. It is defined as Type 36 by the U.S. Department of Agriculture.

==== Habano ====
Habano cigar wrapper is a leaf grown from a Cuban seed, hence the word Habano or Havano, referring to Cuba's capital. Habano tobacco wrapper is darker in color, has a much spicier flavor and a richer aroma, and has been grown in Nicaragua's Jalapa Valley and Estelí since the 1990s.

==== Habano 2000 ====
'Habano 2000' is a cross between 'El Corojo', the standard wrapper leaf from the Vuelta Abajo, the Cuban region that many believe produces the best cigar tobacco in the world, and a tobacco called 'Bell 61–10', a mild cigarette tobacco that is more resistant to blue mold than cigar tobacco. The Cubans first crossed 'El Corojo' and Bell '61-10' tobacco to create something they called 'Habana 2.1.1'. Then, they took the new mixture and crossed it again with 'El Corojo', arriving at 'Habano 2000'.

==== Kizami ====
Kizami is a tobacco product produced in Japan and intended for smoking in Japanese kiseru pipes.

==== Latakia ====
Latakia tobacco is fire-cured over smoldering local hardwoods and aromatic shrubs in Cyprus and Syria. Latakia has a pronounced smoky taste and aroma, and is used in Balkan and English-style pipe tobacco blends.

==== One Sucker Air-cured ====
One Sucker Air-cured tobacco is produced in northern Tennessee, southern Indiana and south central Kentucky. It is also known as Kentucky-Tennessee-Indiana One Sucker, or Dark Air-cured One Sucker. The U.S. Department of Agriculture defines it as Type 35.

==== Oriental Tobacco ====
Oriental tobacco is a sun-cured, highly aromatic, small-leafed variety (Nicotiana tabacum) that is grown in Turkey, Greece, Bulgaria, Lebanon, and North Macedonia. Oriental tobacco is frequently referred to as "Turkish tobacco", as these regions were all historically part of the Ottoman Empire. Many of the early brands of cigarettes were made mostly or entirely of Oriental tobacco (like Murad, Fatima...); today, its main use is in blends of pipe and especially cigarette tobacco (a typical American cigarette is a blend of bright Virginia, burley, and Oriental).

==== Perique ====
Perique comes from Saint James Parish, Louisiana (Paroisse de Saint-Jacques). When the Acadians made their way into this region in 1776, the Choctaw and Chickasaw tribes were cultivating a variety of tobacco with a distinctive flavor. A farmer called Pierre Chenet is credited with first turning this local tobacco into the Perique in 1824 through the technique of pressure fermentation.

Considered the truffle of pipe tobaccos, the Perique is used as a component of many blended pipe tobaccos, but is too strong to be smoked pure. At one time, the freshly moist Perique was also chewed, but none is now sold for this purpose. It is traditionally a pipe tobacco and is still very popular with pipe smokers, typically blended with pure Virginia to lend spice, strength, and coolness to the blend.

==== Shade tobacco ====
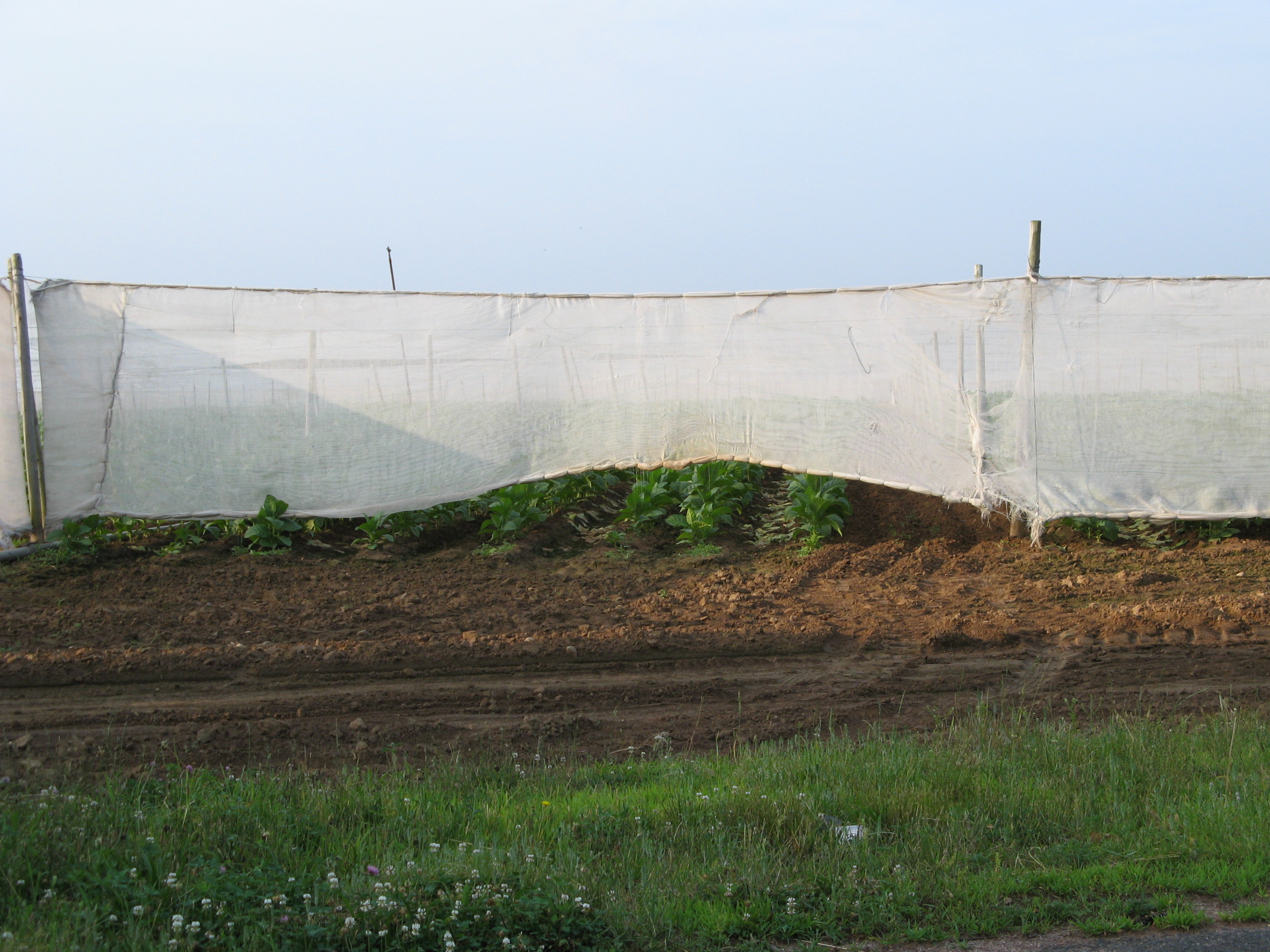
Shade-grown tobacco field in East Windsor, Connecticut

The Northeastern US states of Connecticut and Massachusetts are historically important tobacco-growing regions in the country. Long before Europeans arrived in the area, Native Americans cultivated tobacco along the banks of the Connecticut River. The Connecticut River valley north of Hartford is known as "Tobacco Valley". Until recently, shade-tobacco fields and drying sheds were visible to travelers on the road to and from Bradley International Airport, a major Connecticut airport.

Connecticut shade tobacco is grown under tents to protect plant leaves from direct sunlight. This imitates the conditions of tobacco plants growing in the shade of trees in tropical areas. The result is leaves of lighter color and of a more delicate structure. Prized for its subtle sweetness and elegant, refined flavor, it is used as outer wrappers for some of the world's finest cigars. Who introduced this method of growing tobacco is unclear, but the New York firm of Schroeder & Bon or its founder Frederick A. Schroeder likely was instrumental in developing this agricultural innovation.

Early Connecticut colonists acquired from the Native Americans the habit of smoking tobacco in pipes and began cultivating the plant commercially, though the Puritans referred to it as the "evil weed". The plant was outlawed in Connecticut in 1650, but in the 19th century, as cigar smoking began to be popular, tobacco farming became a major industry, employing farmers, laborers, local youths, southern African Americans, and migrant workers. Working conditions varied from backbreaking work for young local children, ages 13 and up, to backbreaking exploitation of migrants. Each tobacco plant yields only 18 leaves useful as cigar wrappers, and each leaf requires a great deal of individual manual attention during harvesting. The temperature in the curing sheds sometimes exceeds 38 °C (100 °F), and no work is done inside the sheds while the tobacco is being fired.

Connecticut tobacco production peaked in 1921, at 31,000 acres (130 km^{2}) under cultivation. The rise of cigarette smoking and the decline of cigar smoking have caused a corresponding decline in the demand for shade tobacco, reaching a former minimum in 1992 of 2,000 acres (8.1 km^{2}) under cultivation. Since then, cigar smoking has become more popular again, and in 1997, shade-tobacco farming had risen to 4,000 acres (16 km^{2}), but only 1,050 acres (4.2 km^{2}) of shade tobacco were harvested in the Connecticut Valley in 2006. Connecticut seed is also grown in Ecuador, where labor is very cheap. The industry has weathered some major catastrophes, including a devastating hailstorm in 1929, and an epidemic of brown spot fungus in 2000, but is now in danger of disappearing altogether, given the value of the land to real estate speculators. The older and much less labor-intensive broadleaf plant, which produces an excellent Maduro wrapper, as well as binder and filler for cigars, is increasing in the area in the Connecticut Valley. By 2023, less than 50 acres (20 ha) of shade tobacco were planted in all of Massachusetts, and none in Connecticut, a dramatic decrease from its former peak.

==== Southern Maryland tobacco ====
Southern Maryland tobacco is an air-cured tobacco which is also known as Maryland Air-cured. It is produced mainly in southern Maryland and is classified as Type 32 by the U. S. Department of Agriculture.

==== Type 22 ====
'Type 22' tobacco is a classification of United States tobacco product as defined by the U. S. Department of Agriculture, effective date November 7, 1986. The definition states that 'Type 22' tobacco is a type of dark, fire-cured tobacco, known as Eastern District fire-cured, produced principally in a section east of the Tennessee River in southern Kentucky and northern Tennessee. Most 'Type 22' tobacco in northern Tennessee is grown in Robertson and Montgomery Counties in Middle Tennessee. Its principal use is in the manufacture of chewing tobacco.

Type 22 is harvested, stripped and hung inside curing barns and a fire is set to provide optimum conditions for curing the product for sale. Incidentally, several barns are lost to fire each year, usually representing a substantial loss for the grower.

==== Virginia Sun ====
Virginia Sun or Virginia Sun and Air-cured, Dark Air-cured of Virginia is an air-cured or sun-cured tobacco produced in central Virginia north of the James River. The U.S. Department of Agriculture defines it as Type 37.

==== White Burley ====
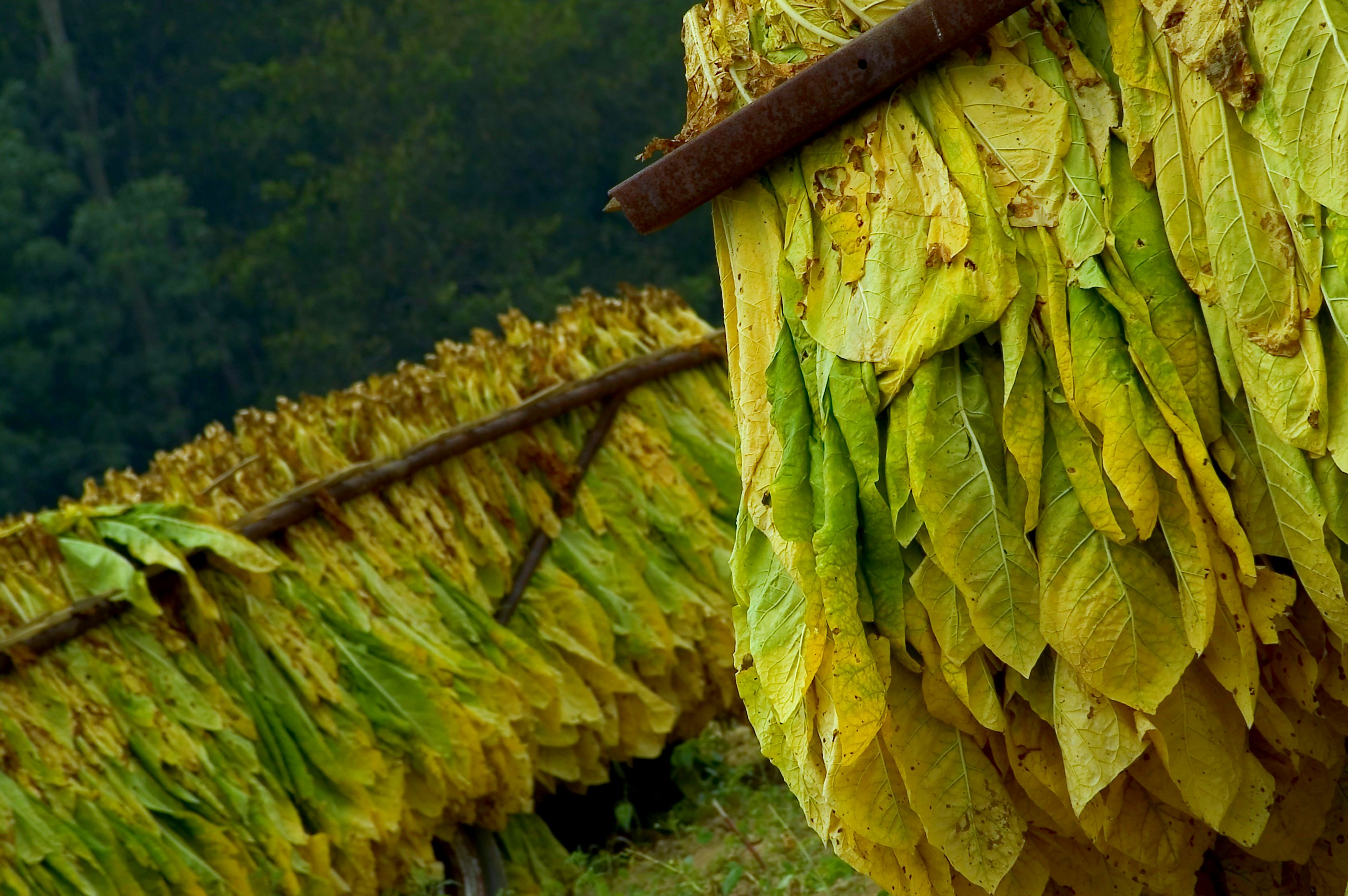
Harvested white burley in Cincinnati, Ohio

White burley, similar to burley tobacco, is the main component in chewing tobacco, American blend pipe tobacco, and American-style cigarettes.

In 1865, George Webb of Brown County, Ohio planted red burley seeds he had purchased and found that a few of the seedlings had a whitish, sickly look. He transplanted them to the fields anyway, where they grew into mature plants, but retained their light color. The cured leaves had an exceedingly fine texture and were exhibited as a curiosity at the market in Cincinnati. The following year, he planted 10 acres (4.0 ha) from seeds from those plants, which brought a premium at auction. The air-cured leaf was found to be mild tasting and more absorbent than any other variety. White burley, as it was later called, became the main component in chewing tobacco, American-blend pipe tobacco, and American-style cigarettes. The white part of the name is seldom used today, since red burley, a dark air-cured variety of the mid-19th century, no longer exists.

== Strains ==
=== Wild tobacco ===
Wild tobacco is native to the southwestern United States, Mexico, and parts of South America. Its botanical name is Nicotiana rustica. In Australia, Nicotiana benthamiana and Nicotiana gossei are two of several indigenous tobaccos still used in some areas. Nicotiana rustica is the most potent strain of tobacco known. It is commonly used for tobacco dust or pesticides.

=== Y1 ===
Y1 is a strain of tobacco that was cross-bred by Brown & Williamson to obtain an unusually high nicotine content. It became controversial in the 1990s when the United States Food and Drug Administration (FDA) used it as evidence that tobacco companies were intentionally manipulating the nicotine content of cigarettes.

Y1 was developed by tobacco plant researcher James Chaplin, working under Dr. Jeffrey Wigand for Brown & Williamson (then a subsidiary of British American Tobacco) in the late 1970s. Chaplin, a director of the USDA Research Laboratory at Oxford, North Carolina, had described the need for a higher nicotine tobacco plant in the trade publication World Tobacco in 1977, and had bred a number of high-nicotine strains based on a hybrid of Nicotiana tabacum and Nicotiana rustica, but they were weak and would blow over in a strong wind. Only two grew to maturity; Y2, which "turned black in the drying barn and smelled like old socks," and Y1, which was a success.

B&W brought the plants to California company DNA Plant Technology for additional modification, including making the plants male-sterile, a procedure that prevents competitors from reproducing the strain from seeds. DNA Plant Technology then smuggled the seeds to a B&W subsidiary in Brazil.

Y1 has a higher nicotine content than conventional flue-cured tobacco (6.5% versus 3.2—3.5%), but a comparable amount of tar, and does not affect taste or aroma. British American Tobacco (BAT) began to discuss the trialling of Y1 tobacco in 1991, despite it not being approved for use in the United States. B&W promised in 1994 to stop using Y1, but at that time they had 7 million lb (3,200 t) of inventory, and continued to blend Y1 into their products until 1999.

== Curing methods ==
Curing is the process of drying the sap and is done under conditions in which the chemical and physiological changes can occur to achieve the desired color in tobacco. Various methods include flue-cure, fire-cure, and air-cure.

=== Cavendish ===
Cavendish is a process of curing and a method of cutting tobacco and is not a type of tobacco. The processing and the cut are used to bring out the natural sweet taste in the tobacco. Cavendish can be produced out of any tobacco type but is usually one of or a blend of; Kentucky, Virginia, and Burley and is most commonly used for pipe tobacco and cigars.

The process begins by pressing the tobacco leaves into a cake about an inch thick. The heat from fire or steam is applied, and the tobacco is allowed to ferment. This is said to result in sweet and mild tobacco. Finally, the cake is sliced. These slices must be broken apart, as by rubbing in a circular motion between one's palms before the tobacco can be evenly packed into a pipe. Flavoring is often added before the leaves are pressed. English Cavendish uses a dark flue or fire cured Virginia (DEC), which is steamed and then stored under pressure to permit it to cure and ferment for several days or weeks.

==== Maduro ====
Maduro is a process for bringing out the sweetness of a tobacco leaf. Maduro is a Spanish word meaning "ripe." Maduro wrappers come from fermenting tobacco in piles at higher temperatures and with more humidity than other tobacco types.
