= Fatima (cigarette) =

American brand of cigarette

- An old American pack of Fatima cigarettes
- Product type: Cigarette
- Current owner: Liggett Group
- Produced by: Liggett Group
- Country: United States
- Introduced: 1870s
- Discontinued: 1980s
- Markets: United States

Fatima Cigarettes (pronounced fa-TEE-ma) was an American brand of cigarettes, manufactured by the Liggett & Myers tobacco company. Early packaging says "Cameron & Cameron Co., Richmond, Va.; Liggett & Myers Tobacco Co. successor."

== History ==
Fatima was launched in the 1870s, and was marketed as an exotic blend of Turkish tobaccos. It was one of the first brands to be made on a cigarette machine. The name Fatima, a common Turkish or Arab woman's name, helped bolster the Turkish image.

In the early 1900s, manufacturers of Turkish and Egyptian cigarettes tripled their sales and became legitimate competitors to leading brands. Fatima cigarettes was one of many cigarettes developed at this time which received wide success. Liggett & Myers Fatima cigarettes, named after a common first name for Arabic women, was one of them. The pack art featured a veiled woman, the Turkish crescent moon with stars, and the Iron Cross, the symbol of the Ottoman Empire. It was the best-selling cigarette brand in the U.S. from 1910 to 1920.

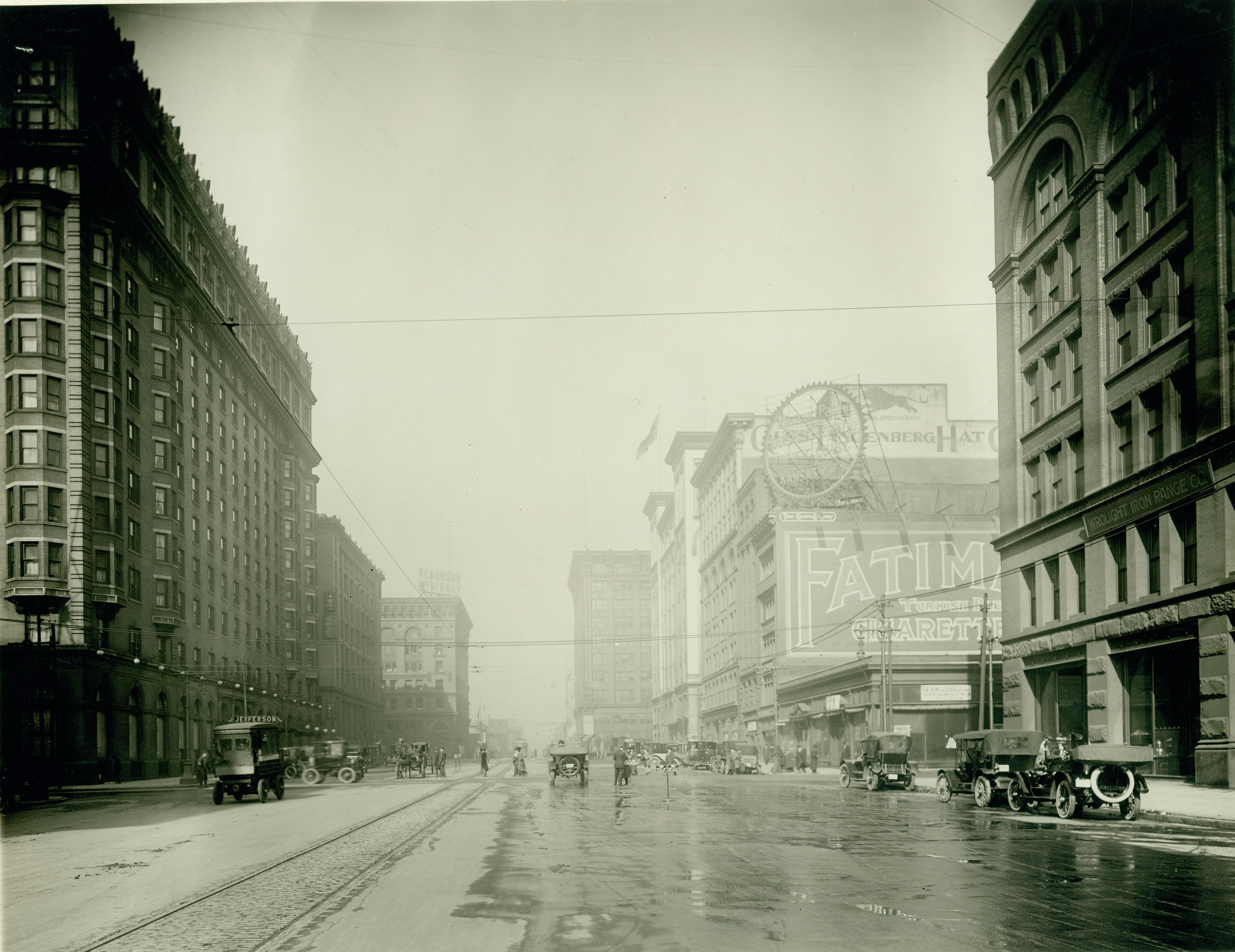
Fatima Cigarettes ad in St. Louis, Missouri around 1914

About 1911 it became the first cigarette brand to be sold in 20-unit packs (15 cents).

Two developments pushed Fatima to the sidelines toward the end of the 1920s. First, the Turkish fad fell victim to politics as the alliances of World War I made the East seem less mysterious than treacherous to Americans. Second, Camel cigarettes came on the market in 1913. N.W. Ayer & Son handled the introduction of Camel, which was a runaway success, and by 1925, Camel had won 40% of the market and R.J. Reynolds led the industry.

Advertising for Fatima was discontinued during the Great Depression.

In the 1940s, with the introduction of L&M's new flagship brand Chesterfield, Fatima became a king size brand; the cigarettes were 10 millimeters longer

Before 1950, the package design included a stylized image of a veiled Middle Eastern woman.

Over time, the brand's old-fashioned image caused it to lose market share from the mid-1950s onward and L&M eventually phased it out by around 1980.

== Marketing ==
Fatima print advertisement c. 1951 featuring Jack Webb of Dragnet. The redesigned package removed the veiled woman image.

Many poster and billboard adverts were made to promote Fatima cigarettes, including a special Christmas ad.

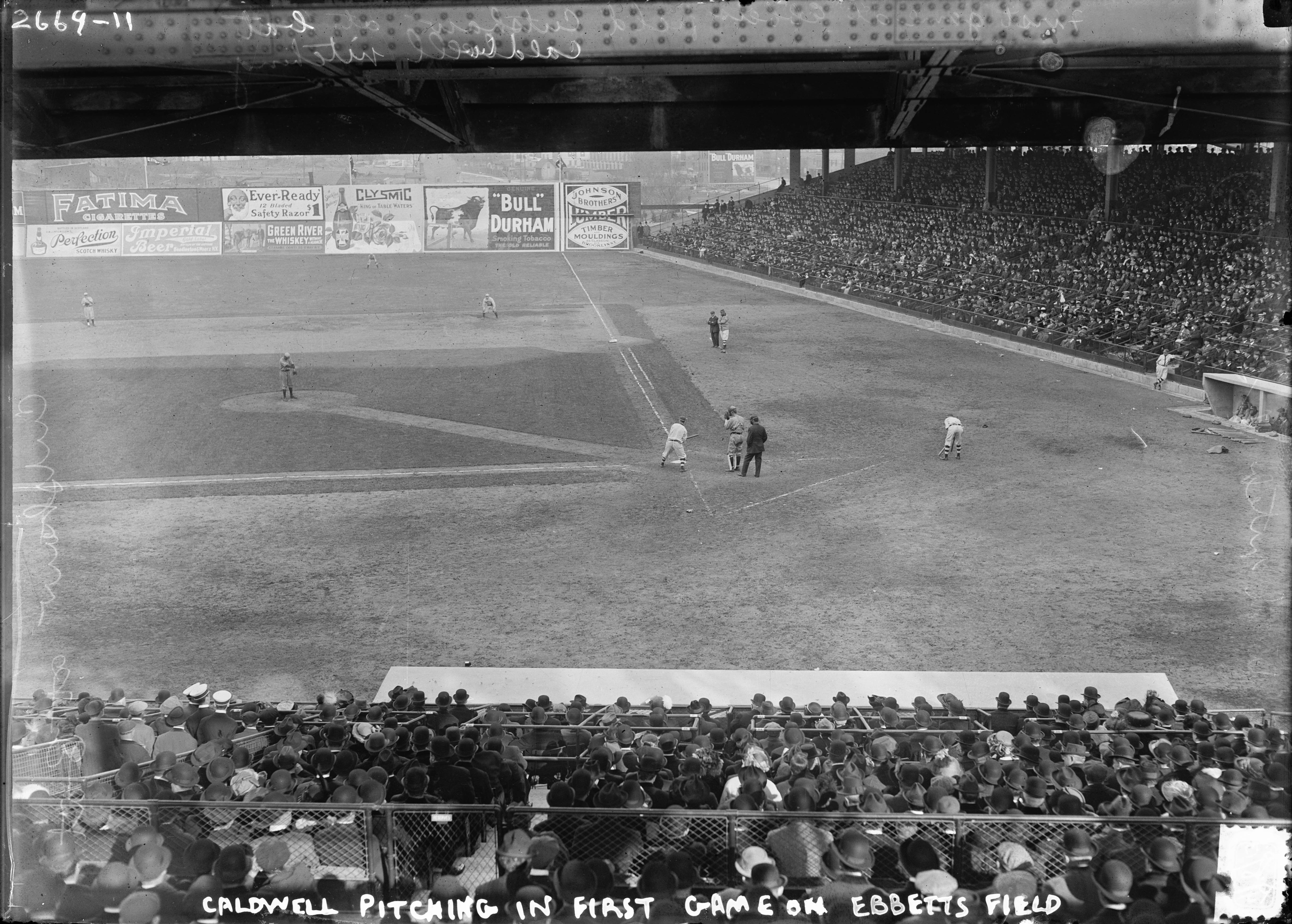
Ebbets Field with Fatima ad visible on outfield wall, 1913

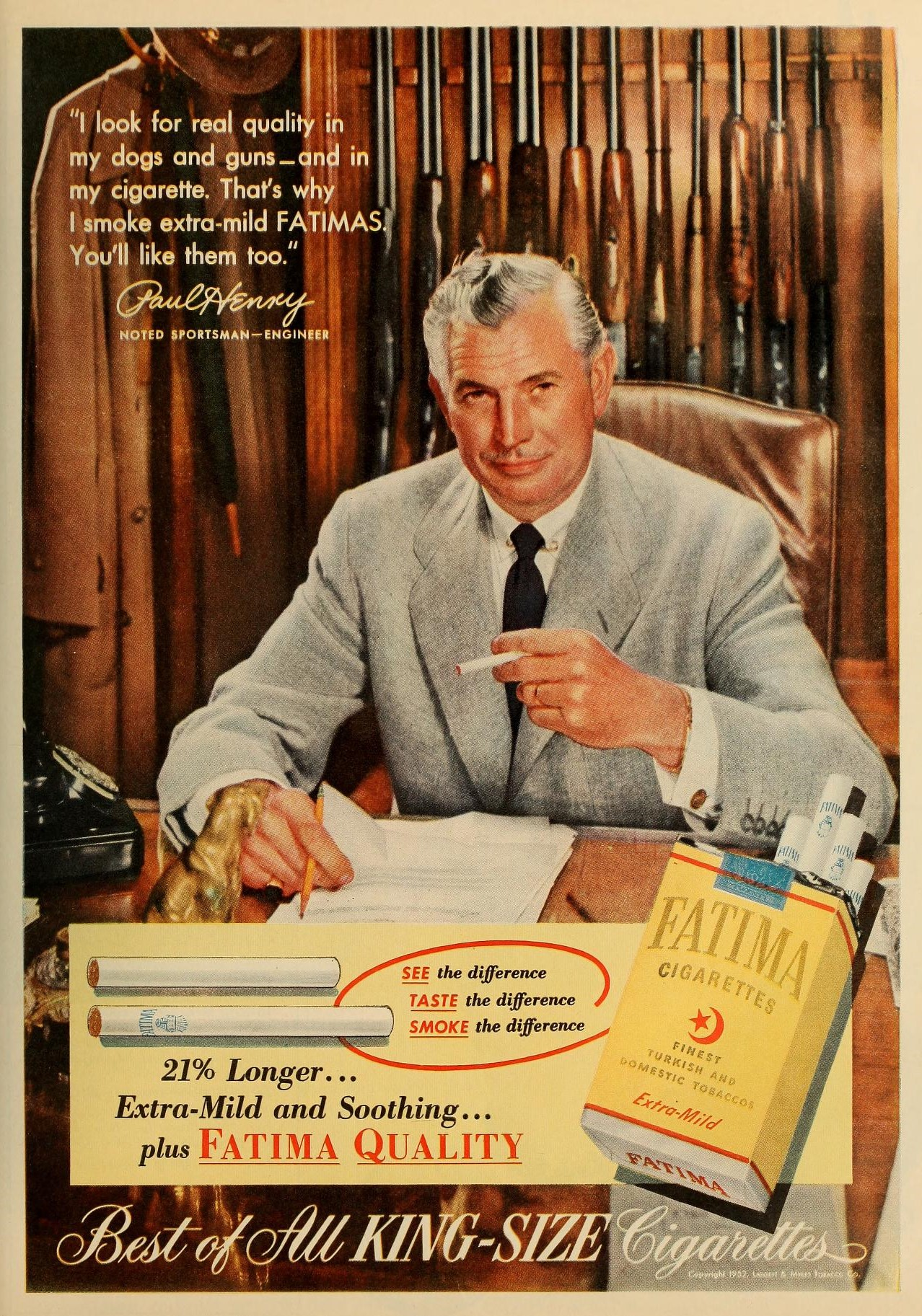
1952 advertisement featuring Paul Henry

Some other advertisement products were also made, such as a flip book, but also various sets of cigarette cards. In 1910, a set of flags from various American Universities were released, and in 1913 a set of American baseball team cards were included in a pack of Fatima cigarettes.

From 1917 to 1919, the Frank Seaman Agency created Fatima advertising aimed at an educated, prosperous consumer who read publications as Town and Country. Ads, tagged "Distinctively individual", claimed that Fatima cigarettes were always appropriate after an elegant meal or a fashionable evening on the town, and they were available for 15¢ for a package of 20. Like its rivals, Liggett offered premiums to purchasers of Fatima, a strategy intended to attract smokers of all classes rather than just the sophisticates represented in its print ads.

Advertising for Fatima was discontinued during the Great Depression. The cigarette received a modern makeover after World War II, becoming a King Size cigarette to compete with other popular brands of the era.

== Sponsorship ==
=== Radio shows ===
In the late 1940s L&M converted the brand to a king-sized version and began an extensive radio advertising campaign. Fatima was the sole sponsor of the early years of the Dragnet radio series. The creator and star of Dragnet, Jack Webb, voiced a number of on-air pitches for the brand and appeared in print advertising as well.

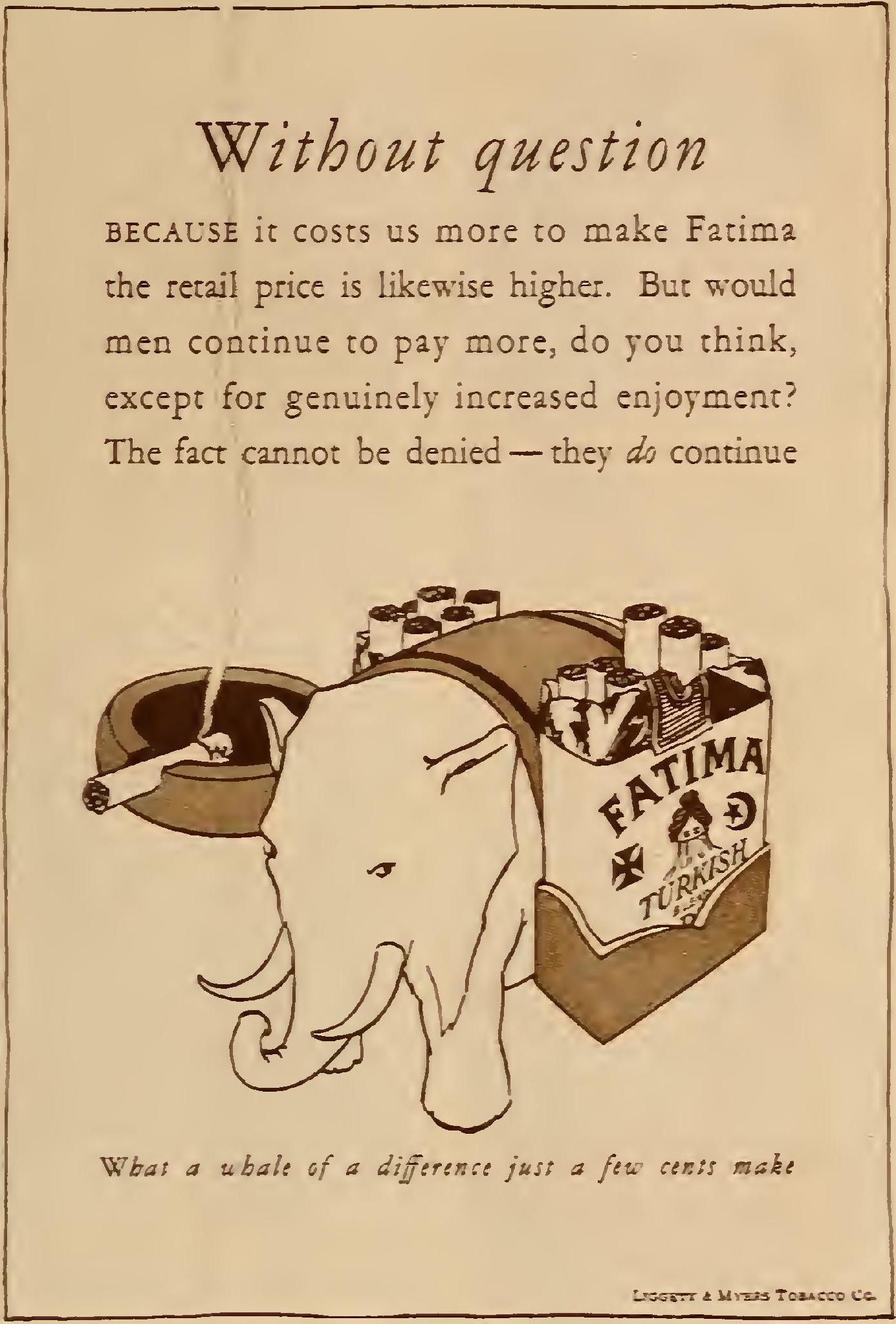
1926 Fatima Turkish Blend Cigarettes ad

There was also a short-lived mystery anthology series called Tales of Fatima, hosted by Basil Rathbone. In Tales of Fatima, Rathbone portrayed himself in adventurous situations played for broad comedy. References to the sponsor, Fatima cigarettes, were embedded in the storylines, and Rathbone also delivered the commercials. In further tie-ins, Rathbone also endorsed the product for a series of magazine ads.

== See also ==
- Turkish tobacco
- Egyptian cigarette industry
- Murad (cigarette)
