= Rea Irvin =

American graphic artist (1881–1972)

- Born: August 26, 1881; San Francisco, California, United States
- Died: May 28, 1972 (aged 90); Frederiksted, Saint Croix, U.S. Virgin Islands
- Education: Mark Hopkins Art Institute
- Occupations: Illustrator, graphic artist, cartoonist, art editor

Rea Irvin (August 26, 1881 – May 28, 1972) was an American graphic artist and cartoonist. Although never formally credited as such, he served de facto as the first art editor of The New Yorker. He created the Eustace Tilley cover portrait and the New Yorker typeface. He first drew Tilley for the cover of the magazine's first issue on February 21, 1925. Tilley appeared annually on the magazine's cover every February until 1994. As one commentator has written, "a truly modern bon vivant, Irvin was also a keen appreciator of the century of his birth. His high regard for both the careful artistry of the past and the gleam of the modern metropolis shines from the very first issue of the magazine ..."

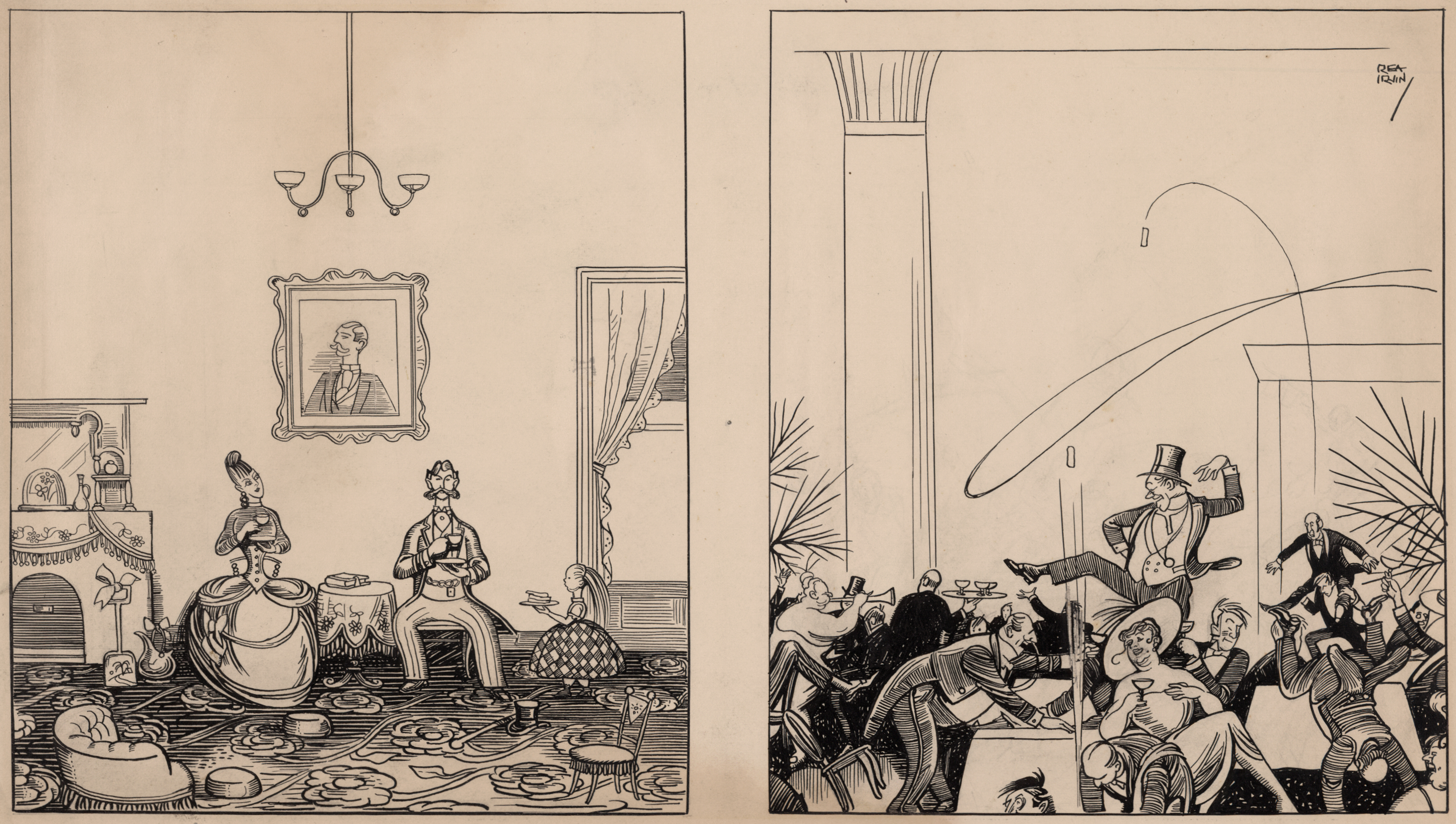
Cartoon for New Year 1917 caricatures how the holiday was noted 50 years earlier contrasted with contemporary celebrations

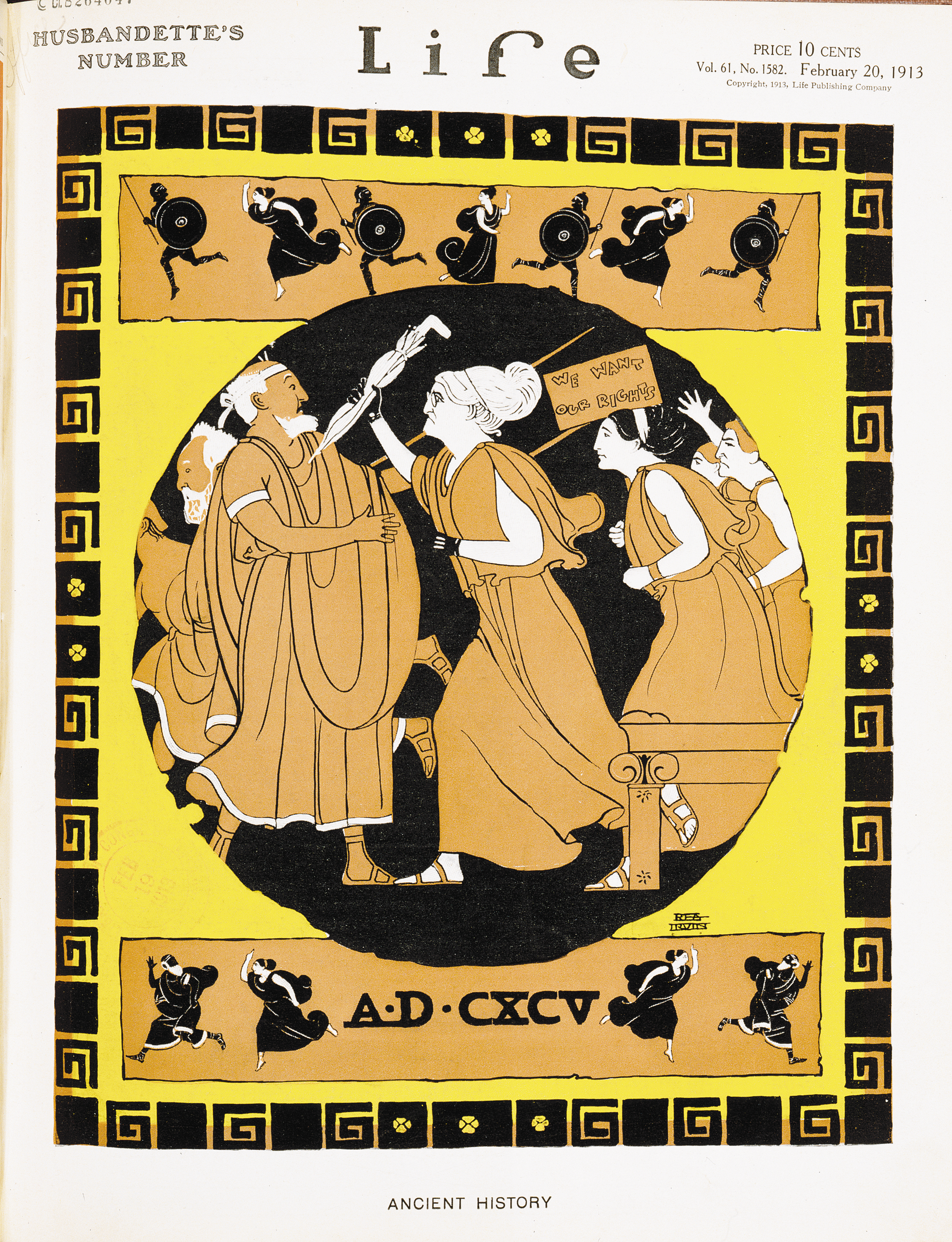
Cover of Life magazine in 1913 showing a Greek-style scene of suffrage activists led by one resembling Susan B. Anthony

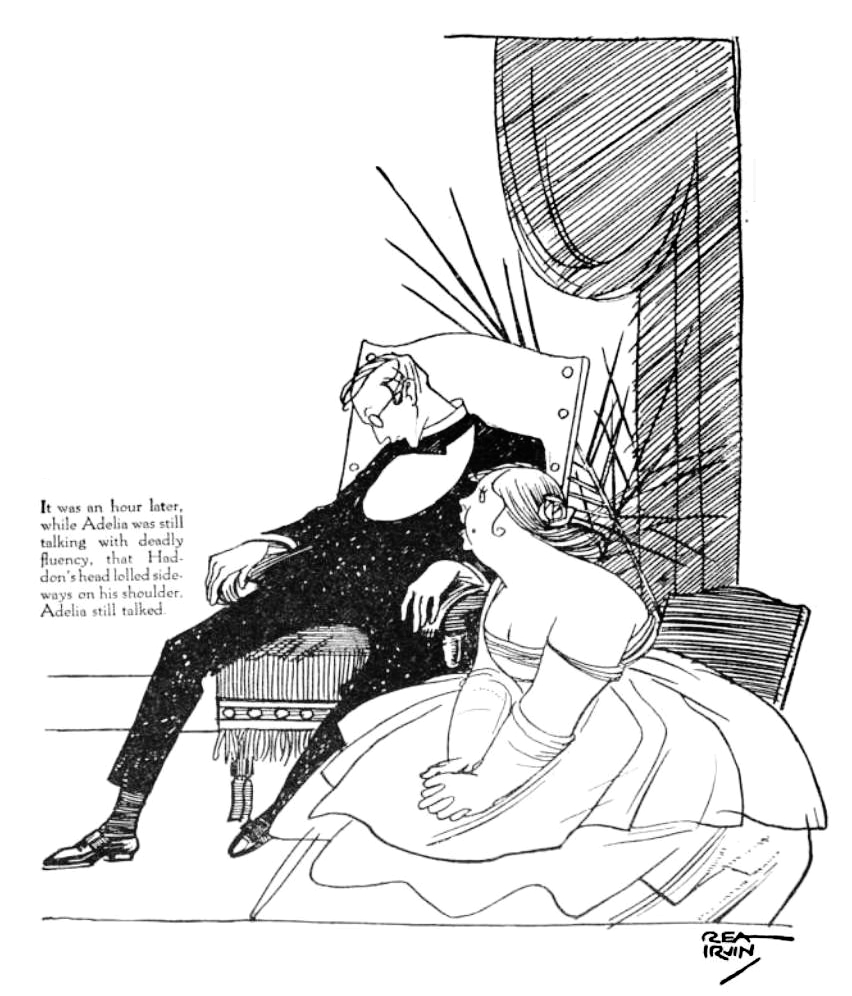
1916 illustration for a short story, "Why He Married Her"

== Early career ==
Born in San Francisco, he studied for six months at the Mark Hopkins Art Institute (later named the San Francisco Art Institute), and then started his career as an unpaid cartoonist for The San Francisco Examiner. The Honolulu Advertiser was among the other newspaper art departments that he served in. He also contributed to the San Francisco Evening Post. He also worked as an itinerant actor (for both stage and screen), newspaper illustrator, and piano player. In 1906 he moved to the East Coast. In the 1910s he contributed many illustrations to both Red Book magazine and its sister publication, Green Book.

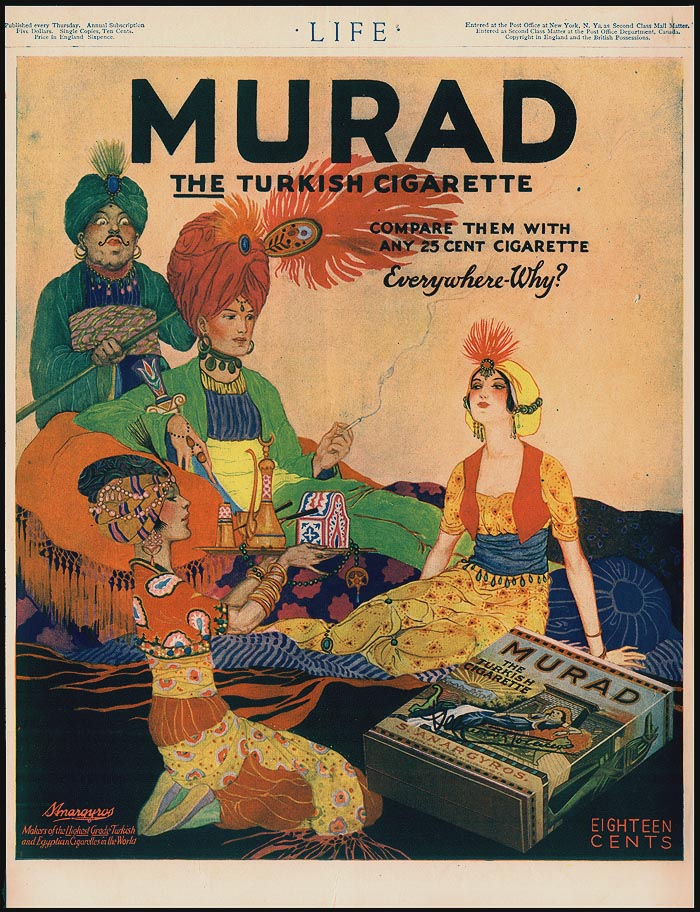
Murad ad by Rea Irvin, 1918

Before World War I, Irvin contributed illustrations regularly to Life, and rose to the position of art editor. (Life the humorous weekly, and not to be confused with the more famous magazine of the same name published by Henry Luce). Irvin also contributed to Cosmopolitan when it was a serious literary publication. He illustrated Wallace Irwin's "Letters of a Japanese Schoolboy" in Life. He would later incorporate Japanese imagery in satirical kakemono for The New Yorker.

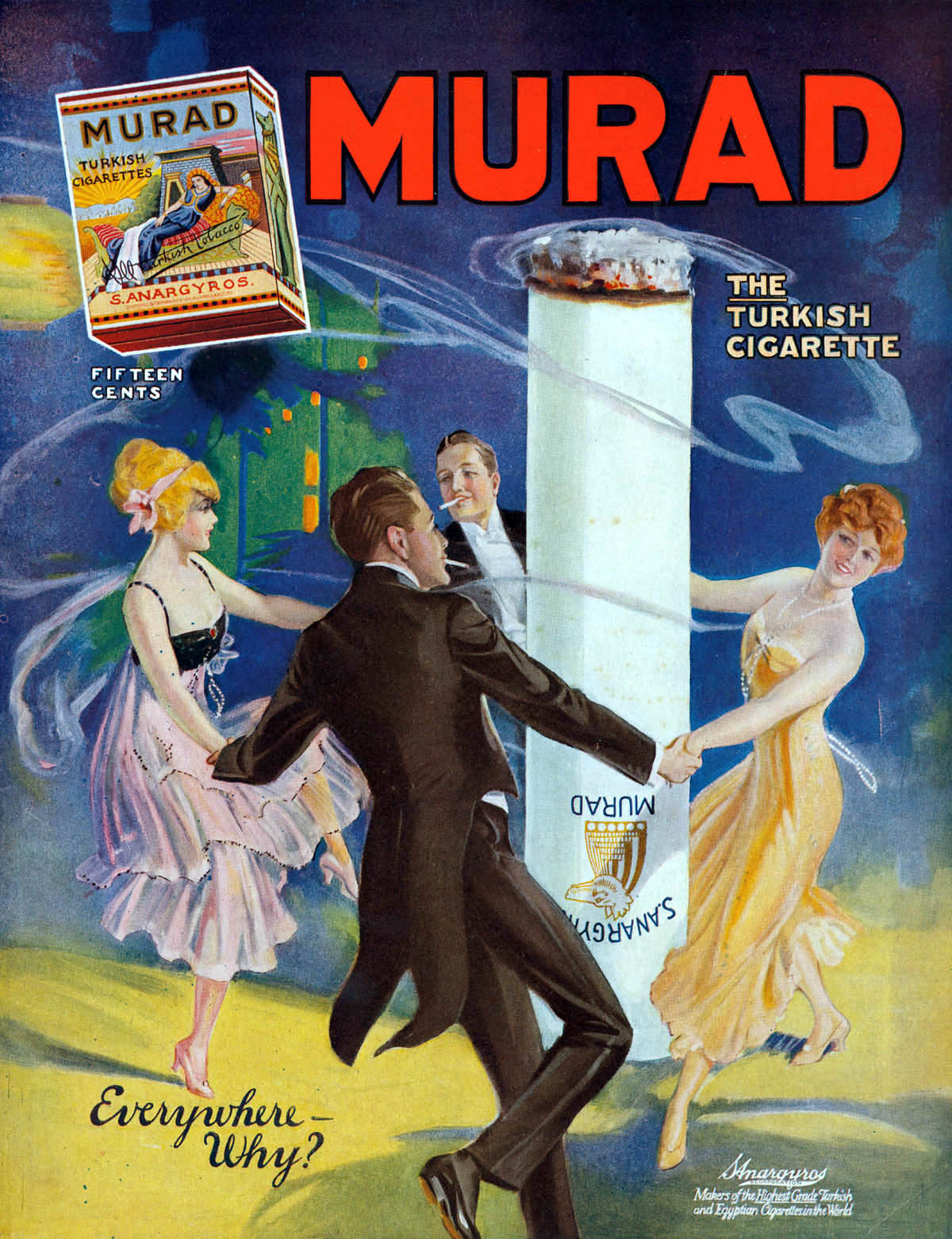
Murad cigarettes ad by Rea Irvin in 1900

He also created a series of humorous advertisements for Murad (turkish tobacco cigarettes).

He also contributed the illustrations for "Snoot If You Must," by Lucius Beebe, a noted raconteur of New York's cafe society (1943, D. Appleton-Century).

He was fired from his position as art editor at Life in 1924.

== Career at The New Yorker ==
However, Irvin had joined an advisory board to help launch The New Yorker and then worked on the magazine's staff as an illustrator and art editor. When he had first taken the job, Irvin had assumed that the magazine would fold after a few issues, but his work would ultimately appear on the cover of 169 issues of The New Yorker between 1925 and 1958.

The magazine's first cover, of a dandy peering at a butterfly through a monocle, was drawn by Irvin; the dandy replaced at the last minute a drawing of theater curtains revealing the skyline of Manhattan. The gentleman on the original cover is referred to as "Eustace Tilley," a character created for The New Yorker by Corey Ford. Another example is the piece known as The Unity of the Allied Nations, which appeared on the cover of the July 1, 1944 issue, and depicts the national personifications of the Allies (the American Eagle, the Chinese Dragon, the Russian Bear and the British Lion).

Besides covers for the magazine, Irvin also drew various illustrations, department headings, caricatures, and cartoons.

The New Yorker signature display typeface, used for its nameplate and headlines and the masthead above The Talk of the Town section, is called "Irvin" or "Irvin type," after him. An alphabet drawn by the American etcher Allen Lewis, who had received training in woodcutting in Paris, was used as the typographical basis for the "Irvin type." Irvin may have spotted Lewis' lettering, which was drawn to imitate a woodcut, in a pamphlet entitled "Journeys To Bagdad", and liked it so much that Irvin asked Lewis to create the entire alphabet. Uninterested in this project, Lewis suggested that Irvin create the alphabet himself –this became the "Irvin type."

He also added the New Yorker's squiggly column rules; these provide a delineation between the text and illustrations. He was also responsible for the vertical "cover strap" that was used for the magazine's margins.

According to James Thurber, "the invaluable Irvin, artist, ex-actor, wit, and sophisticate about town and country, did more to develop the style and excellence of The New Yorker's drawings and covers than anyone else, and was the main and shining reason that the magazine's comic art in the first two years was far superior to its humorous prose." Emily Gordon has written that "Irvin's own intimacy with classic form and craft, and his genial willingness to share that expertise ... allowed him to create a complete device: a design, a typeface, a style, and a mood that would be instantly recognizable, and eminently effective, almost a century later."

== The Smythes ==
Irvin also created the comic strip The Smythes. It ran in the New York Herald Tribune during the early 1930s.

Last week famed Cartoonist Rea Irvin broke into the "funnies" with a new full-page Sunday series ... His title is "The Smythes;" his characters, the conventional father, mother, small son & daughter, Pekinese pup; his theme, the conventional burlesque of U. S. middle-class home life. Sample episode: Mrs. Smythe insists upon buying Pekinese, to utter disgust of Mr. Smythe who snorts, "I don't know what you can see in that mutt." Mrs. Smythe, in desperation, goes to bed. Later, Tootums (the Pekinese) awakes and sneezes. Unable to arouse his wife, Smythe arises, grudgingly walks the floor with Tootums, finally melts, talks baby-talk to Tootums, nurses it back to sleep. Whereupon Mrs. Smythe, awake, triumphantly mocks her husband: "I don't know what you can see in that mutt!"

— Time, June 23, 1930,

Irvin very briefly drew a superhero parody, Superwoman, a Sunday-only strip which debuted on June 27, 1943. However, National Periodicals already had a registered trademark for "Superwoman" and immediately issued a cease-and-desist order. The New York Tribune syndicate withdrew the strip the next day, making the character's debut her only appearance.

== Retirement ==
Six years before his death, Irvin and his wife retired to a home in Frederiksted, Saint Croix, U.S. Virgin Islands. He died of a stroke there at age 90 on May 28, 1972.
