= Tales of Fatima =

1949 old-time radio transcribed show

Cross-promotion of sponsor and radio series

Tales of Fatima is an old-time radio transcribed show that was broadcast on CBS from January 8, 1949, to October 1, 1949.

Basil Rathbone starred as himself in the program, with Francis DeSales portraying Lieutenant Farrell and Agnes Young portraying Lavender, Rathbone's assistant and wardrobe woman. Princess Fatima was a "sultry woman" who inspired Rathbone as she spoke to him in dreams. At the beginning of each episode, Princess Fatima (in a voice that was altered by an echo chamber) gave the audience an "obscure tidbit" as a clue to help listeners solve that night's mystery.

Adventurous situations were played for broad comedy. References to the sponsor, Fatima Cigarettes, were embedded in the storylines, and Rathbone delivered the commercials.

Early publicity said that the show would be based on "actual experiences encountered by Rathbone during his adventurous life", from his younger years in South Africa to his worldwide travels. That concept ended after about 10 episodes, when the series changed to what critic John Crosby described as "more orthodox lines, which is to say the plots are downright fantastic." Another change in format occurred beginning on August 27, 1949. Each episode featured a guest star, and Rathbone played varied roles rather than being heard as himself. Guest stars included John Garfield, Rex Harrison, Bela Lugosi, and Lilli Palmer.

Others actors heard on the program included Frances Chaney, Tony Barrett, Betty Lou Gerson, and Ed Begley. Michael Fitzmaurice was the program's announcer. and Harry Ingram directed the program. Orchestra directors were Carl Hoff and Jack Miller. Gail Ingram was the writer.

The series ended with the October 1, 1949, episode as Fatima sponsorship was shifted to Dragnet on NBC effective October 6, 1949.

== Critical reception ==
A review of the premiere episode in the trade publication Variety described the program as "a weird combination of hard and often taut dramatics", with the mood often broken up by Rathbone's interactions with Fatima. It concluded, "According to the debut stanza, the show's elements are too diverse to jell."

Crosby wrote that on this program Rathbone came off badly in comparison to his portrayal of Holmes and in comparison to his portrayal of Inspector Burke in the Scotland Yard radio series. Crosby wrote, "He just blunders through each case, exhibiting only ordinary intelligence . . ."
