= Murad (cigarette) =

Early 20th century brand of Turkish tobacco cigarettes

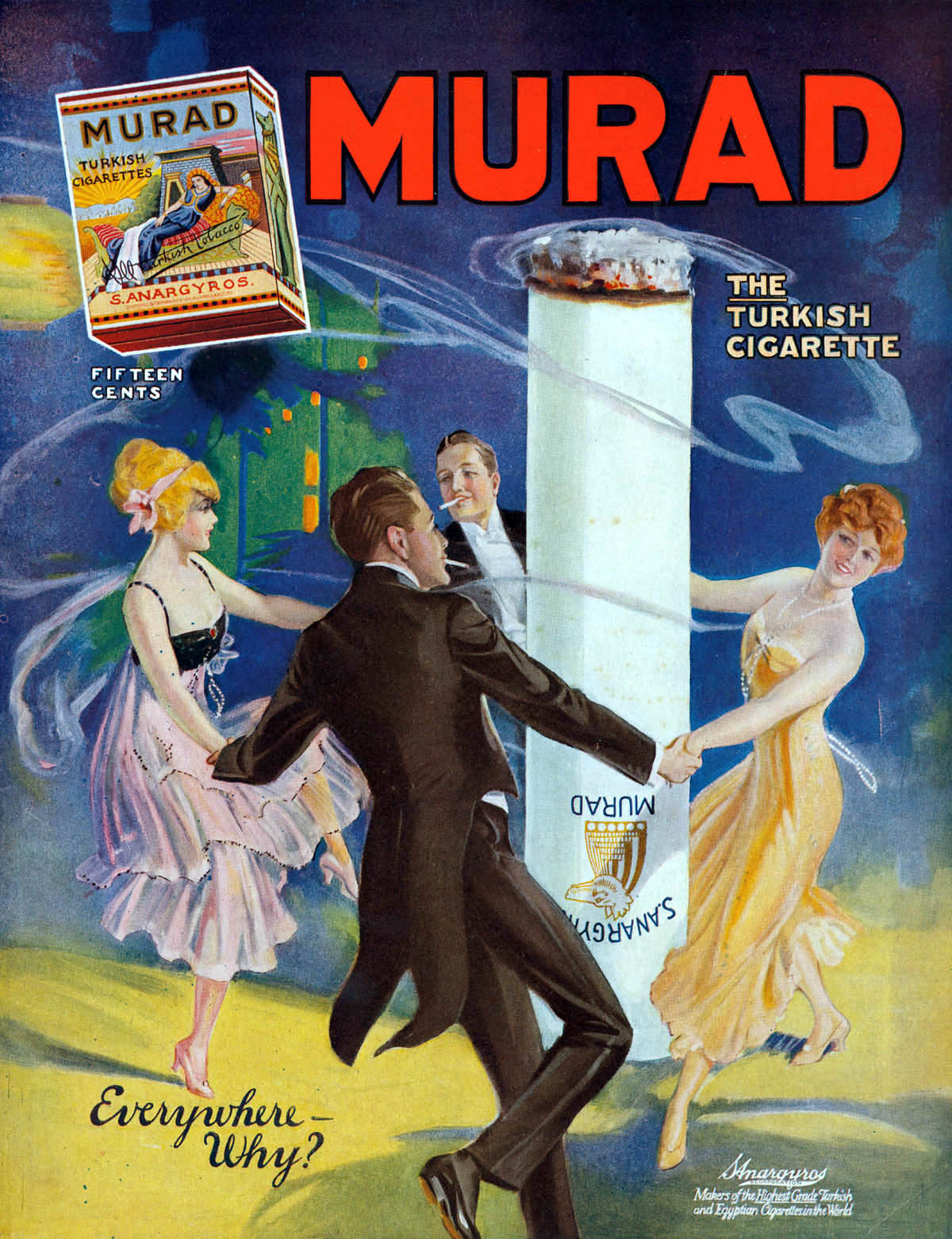
Advertisement for Murad cigarettes by Rea Irvin in 1900

Murad was a brand of cigarettes.

== History ==
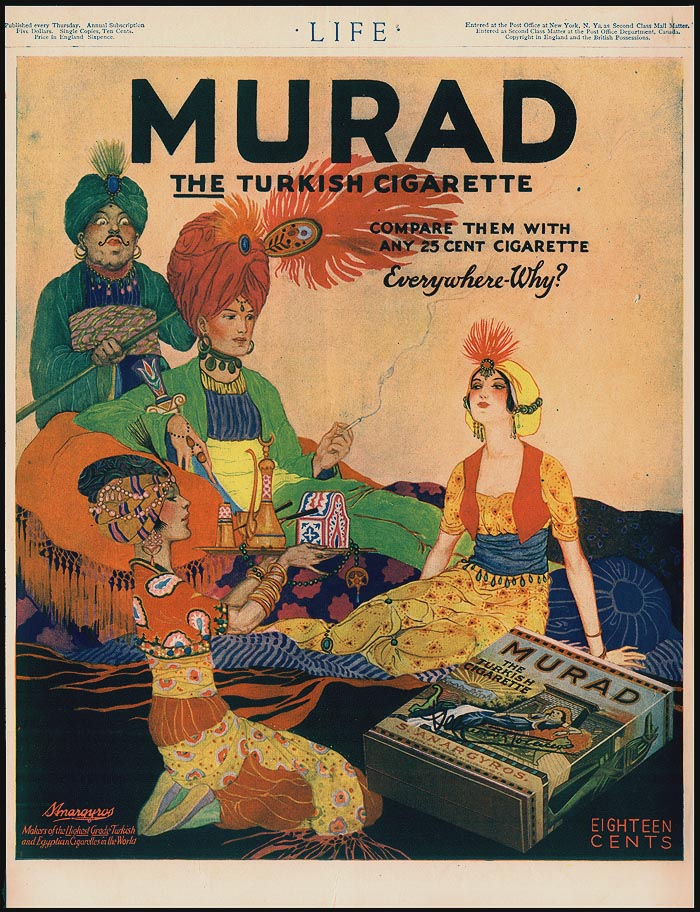
Murad ad by Rea Irvin, 1918

Turkish tobacco is sun-cured, which makes it more aromatic and, like flue-cured tobacco, more acidic than air- or smoke-cured tobacco, thus more suitable for cigarette production.

In the early 1900s, manufactures of Turkish cigarettes tripled their sales and became legitimate competitors to leading brands.

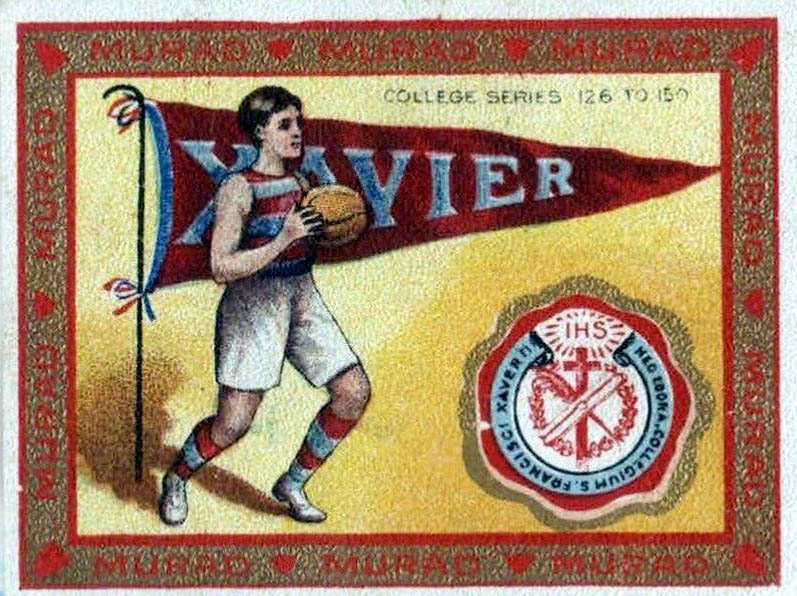
One of the first basketball cards issued in 1910 by Murad Cigarettes, featuring Xavier College

The New York-based Greek tobacconist Soterios Anargyros produced the hand-rolled Murad cigarettes, made of pure Turkish tobacco.

Lorillard acquired the Murad brand in 1911 through the dissolution of the Cigarette Trust, explaining the high quality of the Murad advertisements in the following years.

=== Marketing ===
Murad referenced the Oriental roots of their Turkish tobacco blends through pack art and advertising images. Surely one of the most gorgeously over-the-top ad campaigns for any cigarette was the long-running series for Murad brand made by Rea Irvin.

==== Collectible cards ====
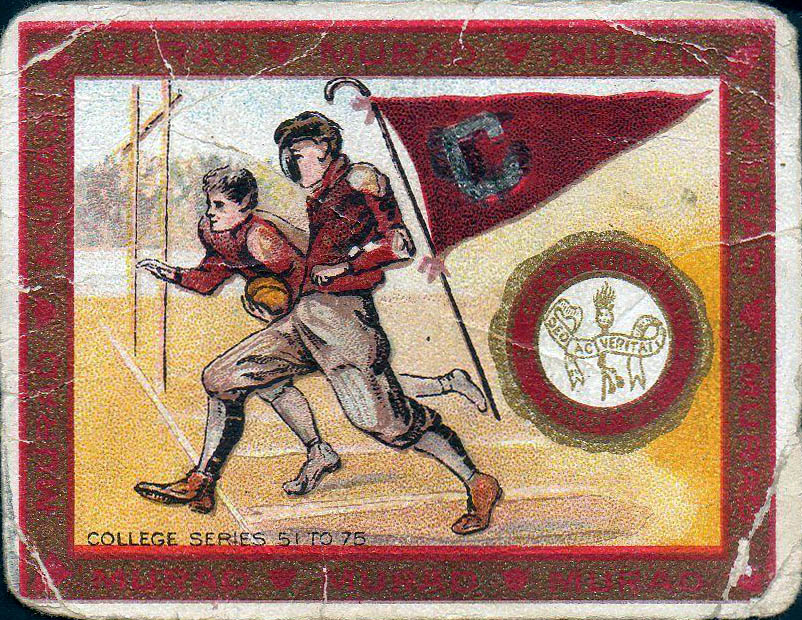
Colgate football team on a cigarette card by Turkish cigarettes company Murad (1910)

Murad Cigarettes issued a series of cigarette cards featuring the university colors, pennants, and seals of various universities and colleges around 1910. Some cards also featured a vignette of a scene, some sporting like baseball, football, or golf, but others with just general scenes. Tobacco cards were often included in packs of cigarettes until the mid-twentieth century and served to stiffen the cigarette packages, advertise, and encourage product loyalty with the collectible cards.

== Decline ==
Nevertheless, due to the rise of American cigarettes, cigarettes containing only Turkish tobacco, like Murad, Fatima, Helmar, Balkan Sobranie or those supplied by urban tobacconists like Fribourg & Treyer or Sullivan Powell in London, are no longer available. Indeed, tastes in Europe and the United States shifted away from Turkish tobacco and towards Virginia tobacco, during and after the First World War.

== See also ==
- Egyptian cigarette industry
- Turkish tobacco
