= Burley (tobacco) =

Light air-cured tobacco used for cigarettes

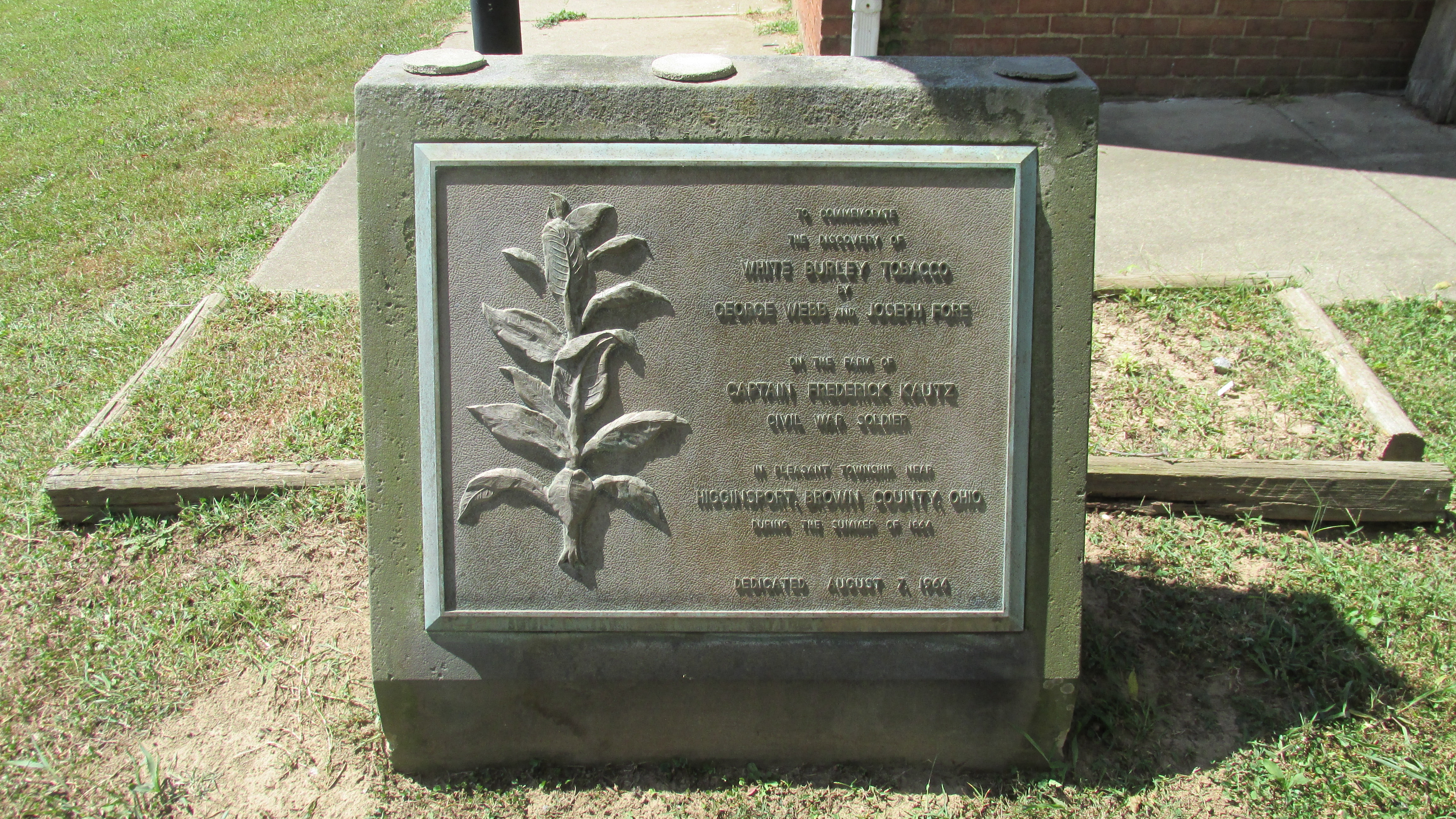
White burley tobacco monument dedicated on 7 August 1964 and located at the Ohio Tobacco Museum in Ripley

Burley tobacco is a light, air-cured tobacco used primarily for cigarette production. In the United States, it is produced in an eight-state belt, with about 70% produced in Kentucky. Tennessee produces around 20%, with smaller amounts produced in Indiana, North Carolina, Missouri, Ohio, Virginia, Maryland, Pennsylvania, and West Virginia. Burley tobacco is produced in many other countries, with major production in Brazil, Malawi, and Argentina.

== History ==
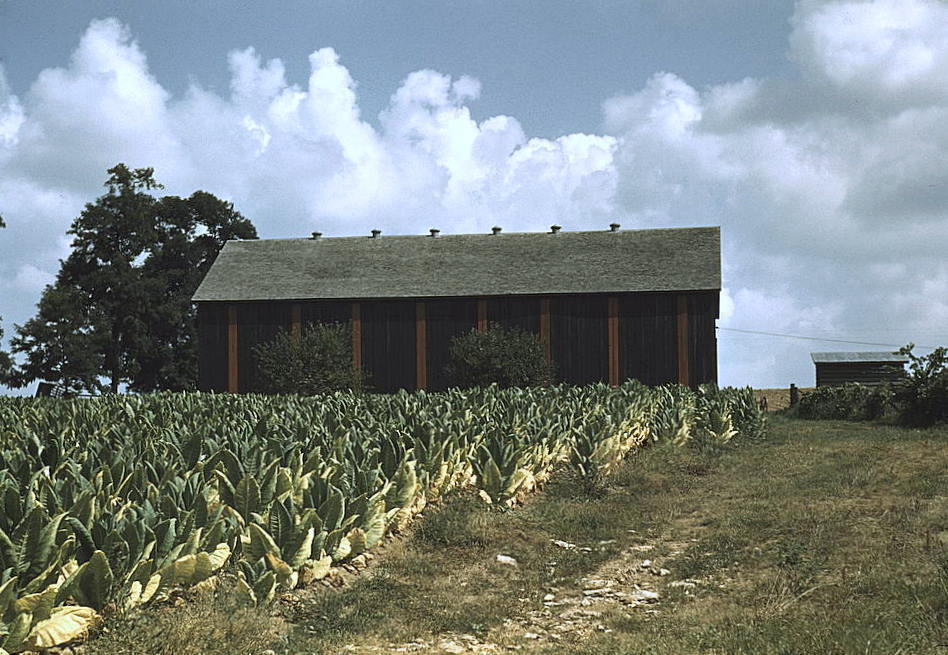
Field of burley tobacco, drying and curing barn in the background, farm of Russell Spears, Lexington, Kentucky, 1940

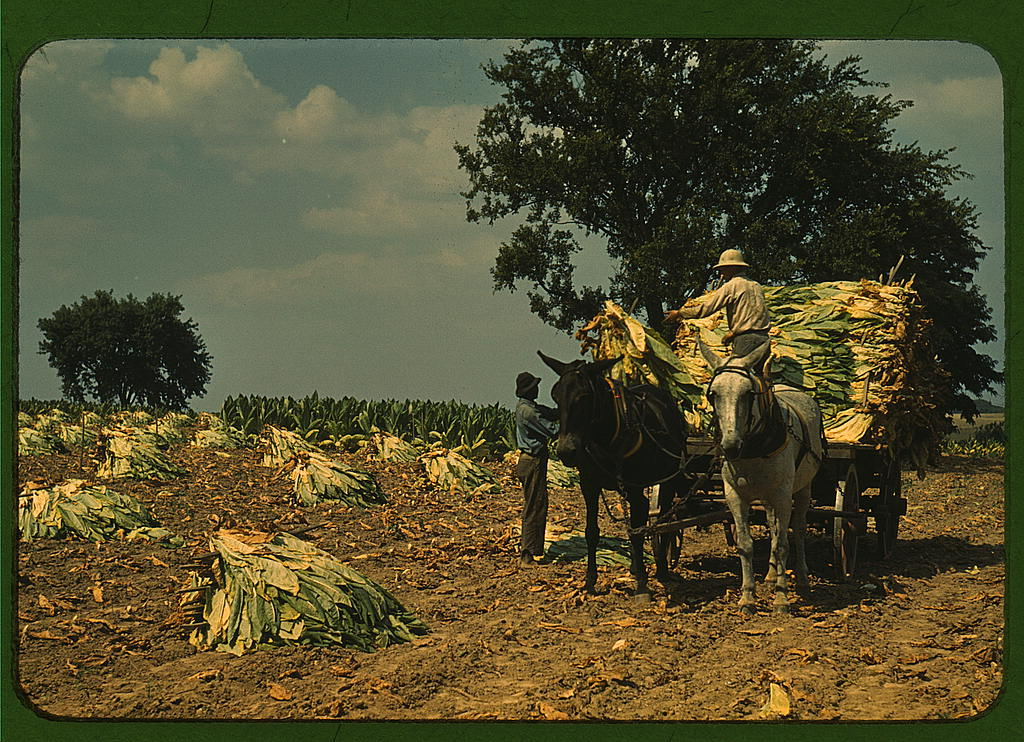
Harvesting burley tobacco, 1940

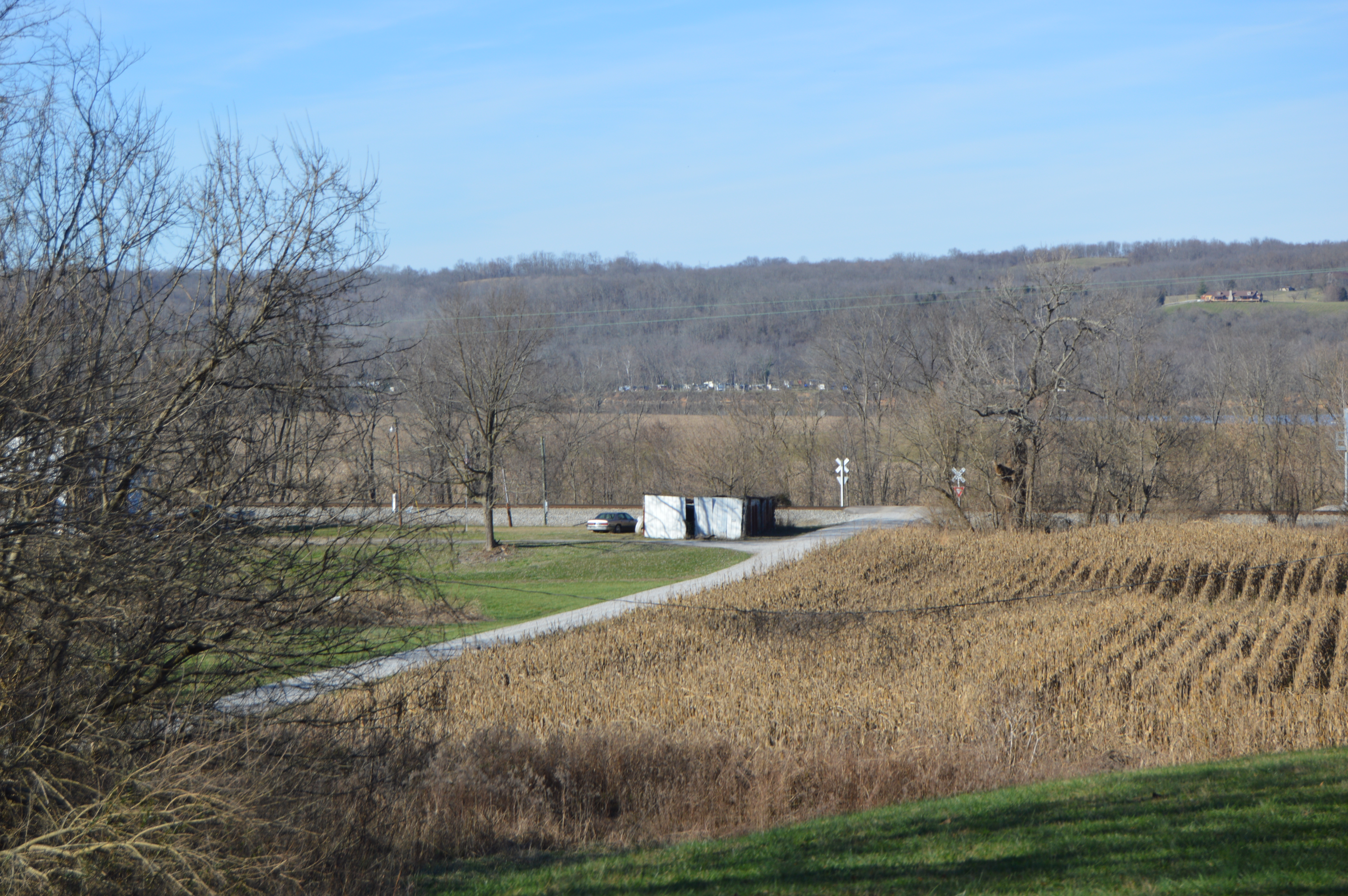
Fields at the George Barkley Farm near Augusta, Kentucky, where Webb and Fore obtained the first white burley seed

The origin of white burley tobacco was credited to George Webb and Joseph Fore in 1864, who grew it on the farm of Captain Frederick Kautz near Higginsport, Ohio, from seed from Bracken County, Kentucky. He noticed it yielded a different type of light leaf shaded from white to yellow, and cured differently. By 1866, he had harvested 20,000 pounds of burley tobacco and sold it in 1867 at the St. Louis Fair for $58 per hundred pounds. By 1883, Cincinnati had become the principal market for this tobacco, and it was grown throughout central Kentucky and Middle Tennessee. In 1880, Kentucky accounted for 36% of the total national tobacco production, and was first in the country, with nearly twice as much tobacco produced as by Virginia, then the second-place state. Later, the type became referred to as burley tobacco, which is air-cured.

== Cultivation & processing ==
In the U.S., burley tobacco plants are started from pelletized seeds placed in polystyrene trays floated on a bed of fertilized water in March or April. Transplanting begins in May and progresses through June with a small percentage set in July. Producers must contend with major diseases, such as black shank and blue mold, and insects including aphids, tobacco hornworms, and budworms. Plants are topped by removing the developing flower head roughly 60 days from transplanting, and treated to prevent the growth of side shoots called suckers. Topping allows energy that would have produced a bloom to promote leaf expansion.

Many of the benefits in topping at the appropriate bloom stage and leaf number are lost if suckers are not controlled. Suckers grow vigorously immediately after topping and can severely reduce yield and quality if not effectively controlled. Some varieties, such as 'KY 14xL8' and 'Narrowleaf Madole', are known to have more rapid sucker growth than other varieties and may require more aggressive sucker-control strategies. Three types of chemicals are available for controlling sucker growth on tobacco.

About four weeks after topping, the tobacco is stalk-cut, using a knife that is shaped like a tomahawk. Each plant is speared, spiked, or spudded (the terminology depending on the geographic location) onto a stick topped by a metal spear, spike, or spud that fits over the stick. Each stick contains five or six stalks.

Sticks of green-cut tobacco are most often allowed to field-wilt for three or four days prior to hanging in a barn. Tobacco is allowed to air-cure for eight or more weeks, turning from the normal pale green to yellow and then to brown. Burley that cures too quickly can retain some of the yellow pigments, as well as chemicals that normally break down with a slower cure. The quality achieved by U.S. burley producers is primarily due to natural curing conditions. Once fully cured burley is taken down, sticks are removed and leaves are stripped from the plant into grades by stalk position. Leaves are baled by grade and taken to a receiving station run by a tobacco manufacturer or leaf dealer.

== Sweetening ==
Burley contains little sugar, and has generally been cased (sweetened) with humectants, sugars, or other flavors for uses such as in American-blend cigarettes. As a result, a broad ban enacted by Canada and proposed in many other countries would block the import of nearly all tobacco products containing burley. The situation resembles a dispute between Asian producers and the United States, which banned clove cigarettes. For each nation, banning components typical of tobacco manufactured abroad provides a powerful trade advantage, but may be prohibited by WTO (formerly, GATT) trade agreements. The effect on American producers is limited, but not negligible, as most Canadian imports were already of flue-cured Virginia tobacco.

== See also ==
- Types of tobacco
