= List of artifacts in the National Museum of American History =

Since its founding in 1964, the National Museum of American History has approximately 1.7 million artifacts in its collection include the following: 22,000 linear feet of archival documents, 52,044 photographs, 5,631 medals, 2,956 sound recordings, 3,797 models, 15,136 posters and 36,264 coins among several other artifacts.

== Before 1400s ==
| Image | Title | Year | Creator | Original owner | Location | I.D. Number | Sources |
|---|---|---|---|---|---|---|---|
| | Cuneiform Tablet | 2004-2112 BC | Unknown Babylonian writer | | Dhi Qar, Ur, Iraq | NU.NU65375 | |
| | Cuneiform Tablet | 2004-1900 BC | Unknown Babylonian writer | | Bābil, Babylon (modern day Iraq) | NU.79.112.OC12 | |
| | Yuan Feng T'ung Pao coin | 1078 - 1086 | Northern Sung Dynasty | | Northern Sung Dynasty, China | 2017.0060.0162 | |

== 1400s ==
| Italian Albarello | 1475-1499 | Emilia-Romagna, Italy | Emilia-Romagna, Italy | 1991.0664.0500 |

== 1500s ==
| Automaton of a Friar | 1500s | Unknown | Europe | ME.336451 |
| Mexican reales | 1536 | Spanish Empire Government | Spanish Empire | 1992.0061.0459 |
| Scudo D'oro | 1541 | Genoa Republic, Italy | Republic of Genoa | NU.68.159.3971 |
| Couronne D'or | 1542-1544 | Brabant, Spanish Netherlands | Spanish Empire | NU.68.159.2660 |
| European Planispheric Astrolabe | 1542 | Unknown | Europe | MA.316759 |
| Ducat from Danzig, Poland | 1546 | Danzig, Poland | Poland | NU.68.159.5047 |
| French Planispheric Astrolabe | 1548 | Unknown | France | MA.316760 |

== 1600s ==
| Image | Title | Year | Creator | Original owner | Location | I.D. Number | Sources |
|---|---|---|---|---|---|---|---|
| | James Forbes Flintlock Fowler Shotgun | 1620 | Unknown English gunsmith | James Forbes of Connecticut | England | AF.78102M | |
| | Beggar man and beggar woman conversing | 1630 | Rembrandt Van Rijn | | Holland | 1978.0534.40 | |
| | German flintlock rifle conversion from wheellock | 1655 | Unknown | Ralph G. Packard | Germany | AF.43467 | |

== 1700s ==
| Image | Title | Year | Creator | Original owner | Location | I.D. Number | Sources |
|---|---|---|---|---|---|---|---|
| | Hide Painting of St. Anthony | 1700-1710 | Unknown friar | | New Mexico | CL.176402 | |
| | Small sword made in 1733 | 1733 | United Kingdom | | United Kingdom | AF.35491 | |
| | Conestoga Wagon | 1750-1850 | Unknown German Pennsylvanians | | Pennsylvania | TR.321453 | |
| | British Cannon | 1751 | Jan Verbruggen | Royal Arsenal | United Kingdom | AF.32854 | |
| | "TOWNE OF BOSTON" | before 1754 | Boston, Massachusetts | Unknown | Boston | AF.43450 | |
| | Silver Cigarette Box | 1756 | Unknown | Ella Rice Templin | City of London | DL.61.0318 | |
| | Belton Repeating Flintlock Fusil | 1758 | Joseph Belton | | United Kingdom | 1982.0151.01 | |
| | Choate-Caldwell House | 1768 | Abraham Choate | | Massachusetts | DL.64.545 | |
| | Tumbler | 1769-1774 | Henry William Stiegel | Dr. and Mrs. Arthur M. Greenwood | America | CE.389217 | |
| | Andrea Ferarra Broadsword | 1770 | Andrea Ferrara | Unknown British Revolutionary officer | United Kingdom | AF.43391 | |
| | A spoon engraved by Paul Revere | 1771-1772 | Edmé-Pierre Balzac | Paul Revere | Massachusetts | DL.60.2214 | |
| | Declaration of Independence Desk | 1775-1776 | Thomas Jefferson | | Pennsylvania | PL.031819 | |
| | Musket wooden stock | 1776 | Unknown | | America | AF.58890-N(1) | |
| | Musket brass trigger guard | 1776 | Unknown | | America | AF.58890-N(3) | |
| | USS Philadelphia | 1776 | Hermanus Schuyler | Continental Navy | Philadelphia | AF.58888-N(1) | |
| | Guidon of the Second Regiment Light Dragoons | 1777 | Unknown | Second Regiment Light Dragoons | New York | AF.73540M | |
| | Benjamin Franklin's suit | 1778 | Unknown French tailor | Benjamin Franklin | France | 2012.0187.001 | |
| | English plate | 1778 | London, England | Unknown | City of London | DL.388312 | |
| | Light Dragoon pistol | 1779 | Unknown | Adriana and Edwin W. Bitter | America | 1989.0149.01 | |
| | British Officer Tricorn | 1780 | United Kingdom | Unknown British Officer | United Kingdom | AF.UH-398 | |
| | George Washington's waistcoat | 1780 | Unknown | George Washington | America | AF.16149 | |
| | George Washington's Breeches | 1780 | Unknown | George Washington | America | AF.16150 | |
| | George Washington's uniform | 1780 | Unknown | George Washington | America | AF.16148 | |
| | Washington family coach panel and label | before 1789 | Unknown | Martha and George Washington | America | PL.016107 | |
| | North African Miquelet Jezai | Sept. 21, 1789 - Sept 9, 1790 | Muhammad the gunsmith | Thomas Jefferson | Montenegro | AF.16083 | |
| | 200 £ check written by Aaron Burr | February 27, 1790 | Aaron Burr | Chase Manhattan Bank | New York | NU.79.112.X00026 | |
| | Letter to a young gentleman at school | January 17, 1792 | Unknown | Copp Family | Connecticut | DL.006791.03.001 | |
| | Candle stand used by George Washington while writing the Farewell Address, | 1796 | Unknown | George Washington | America | PL.1185 | |

== 1800s ==
| Image | Title | Year | Creator | Original owner | Location | I.D. Number | Sources |
|---|---|---|---|---|---|---|---|
| | Andrew Jackson's dueling pistols | 1800s | Unknown | Andrew Jackson | America | AF.16089A and AF.16089B | |
| | Henry Clay's straw hat | 1800s | Unknown | Henry Clay | America | PL.035547 | |
| | Composite Flintlock Musket | 1800 | Unknown | | America | AF.7355 | |
| | Miquelet Lock Musket Presented to President Thomas Jefferson | Before 1802-1803 | Ammal Barah | Thomas Jefferson | Morocco | AF.16084 | |
| | Map of the Harbor of Tripoli | 1804-1811 | Unknown | | America | AF.236802 | |
| | A British officer's Baker Rifle | 1805 | William Smith | Unknown officer | United Kingdom | AF.43480 | |
| | James Wilson's Terrestrial Globe | 1811 | Unknown | James Wilson | Vermont | CL.388722 | |
| | Major Lemuel Montgomery's Pistol | 1812 | Unknown American gunsmith | Lemuel P. Montgomery | America | AF.16090 | |
| | Star-Spangled Banner | 1813 | Mary Young Pickersgill | Fort McHenry | Maryland | AF.13649 | |
| | Charred wooden beam from the original White House burned down in the War of 1812 | August 24, 1814 | United States Government | | Washington D.C. | PL.274163.01 | |
| | A History of the American Revolution | 1824 | Samuel Williams | John Brenton Copp | America | DL.006866.05 | |
| | Major Clarkson's vest | 1824-1836 | Unknown | Major Clarkson | America | 2013.0283.001 | |
| | 1827 tuition receipt from St. Joseph Academy | May 19, 1827 | St. Joseph Academy | Mrs. Arnold Miles | Maryland | DL.62.0543 | |
| | The Biography of the Signers of the Declaration of Independence | 1828 | John Sanderson | Copp Family | Pennsylvania | DL.006868.053 | |
| | Sam Houston's rifle | 1830s | Henry Gross | Sam Houston | Texas | AF.16085 | |
| | Plymouth Rock fragment with an 1830 inscription | December 28, 1830 | Lewis Bradford | Virginia L. W. Fox | Massachusetts | PL.012058 | |
| | John Bull Locomotive | 1831 | Robert Stephenson and Company | Camden and Amboy Railroad | United Kingdom | TR.180001 | |
| | Equestrian Order of the Holy Sepulchre of Jerusalem badge and sash, Papal States | 1833-1917 | Order of the Holy Sepulchre | Frederick W. MacKay | Papal States | NU.67.94570a | |
| | Military Order of the Tower and Sword star | 1833-1917 | Government of Portugal | Frederick W. MacKay | Portugal | NU.67.94584b | |
| | U.S. Hall Breechloading Rifle, Cut Down, Model 1819/1834 | 1834 | John H. Hall | Harper's Ferry | America | AF.96911 | |
| | Catalina Juliana Mason's map of New York | 1837-1847 | Catalina Juliana Mason | Unknown | New York | TE.H33819.A | |
| | French-made black beaver tophat | 1837-1847 | Mugnier | Uncle Abe | France | CS.015678 | |
| | Self-Adjusting Loom Temple Patent Model | July 22, 1837 | Samuel P. Mason | Unknown | Rhode Island | TE.T11414.073 | |
| | Loom Heddles and Harness Patent Model | December 29, 1837 | Benjamin Hartford and William B. Tilton | Unknown | New Hampshire | TE.T11409.015 | |
| | Henry Deringer Rifle | 1838 | Henry Deringer Jr. | William J. Graves | Pennsylvania | AF.625A | |
| | Speeder for Roving Cotton Patent Model | May 4, 1838 | William Mason | Unknown | Massachusetts | TE.T11421.043 | |
| | Colt Holster Model Paterson Revolver (No. 5) | 1839 | Samuel Colt | United States Patent Office | New Jersey | AF.251084 | |
| | Daguerreotype self-portrait of Henry Fitz Jr. | November 1839 | Henry Fitz Jr. | | Maryland | PG.004114A | |
| | Ulysses S. Grant's U.S. Military Academy Cadet Coatee | 1839 | United States Military Academy | Ulysses S. Grant | New York | AF.39361 | |
| | Daguerreotype of Unitarian Congregational Church, New York City | 1839-1840 | Dr. John W. Draper | | New York City | PG.72.72.B155 | |
| | Undated Daguerreotype of John Quincy Adams | 1840s | Unknown | John Quincy Adams | Washington D.C. | PL.277275.35 | |
| | Portrait of unidentified man | 1840s | William Constable | | United Kingdom | PG.71.22.045 | |
| | Cliveden, Germantown, Pennsylvania | 1840 | Walter R. Johnson | | Pennsylvania | PG.000165 | |
| | George Washington | 1840 | Horatio Greenough | United States Congress | America | 1910.10.3 | |
| | Mexican Army frock coat | 1840 | Mexican Army | Unknown | Mexico | AF.16156 | |
| | Dorothy Catherine Draper | June 1, 1840 | John William Draper | | New York City | PG.72.72.B001 | |
| | Daguerreotype of Baltimore Street Scene | 1840-1844 | Henry Fitz Jr. | | Maryland | PG.004114E | |
| | Niagara Falls in winter | 1840-1850 | Unknown | | Either America or Canada | 1985.0736.49.11 | |
| | Portrait of lepidopterist | 1840-1860 | Unknown | | America | PG.67.51 | |
| | Robert Haldane, Principal of University of St. Andrews | 1843-1848 | James Craig Annan | Robert Haldane | Scotland | PG.001700 | |
| | Cherokee .28 Caliber Percussion Pistol | 1843 | Salola | United States Patent Office | North Carolina | AF.96913 | |
| | Portrait of a woman | 1845-1855 | Unknown | William and Dennis Ramsay | Virginia | DL.220760.005B | |
| | Portrait of a carpenter holding a folding rule | 1845 | Unknown | | America | 2003.0215.04 | |
| | Colt Walker pistol | 1846 | Colt Manufacturing Company | Unknown Mexican-American War soldier | Connecticut | 1993.0415.01 | |
| | A stone from a Mexican fort | Before 1847 | Unknown | Unknown | Mexico | AF.18965 | |
| | Annie Reigart Haldeman's wedding dress | 1847 | Unknown tailor | Annie Reigart | Pennsylvania | CS.249937.003 | |
| | Dramatic Works of Shakespeare | 1847 | Unknown | William Irvin Wolfley | America | MG.M-09635 | |
| | Daguerreotype of Dr. James Beall Morrison | 1848 | Unknown | Dr. James Beall Morrison | Pennsylvania | 1991.0723.03 | |
| | Daguerreotype of Louis Jacques Mandé Daguerre | 1848 | Charles R. Meade | Louis Jacques Mandé Daguerre | France | PG.003115 | |
| | Gold Nugget | 1848 | James Marshall | John Sutter | California | CL.135(1861).01 | |
| | Guerrilleros Mexicanos | 1848 | Unknown | Harry T. Peters | Either Mexico or America | DL.60.2559 | |
| | Two Colt Whitneyville Hartford Presentation Dragoon Revolvers given to Brigadier General George W. Morgan | 1848 | Samuel Colt | Brigadier General George W. Morgan | America | AF.8957A and AF.8957B | |
| | Advertising on Buildings | 1848-1849 | Walter R. Johnson | | New Jersey | PG.000526 | |
| | Abraham Lincoln's Patent Model | 1849 | Abraham Lincoln | | Illinois | PL.031940 | |
| | Colt M1849 Pocket Revolver | 1849 | Samuel Colt | Charles Bremner Hogg Jackson | America | 1980.0399.0702 | |
| | Edwin Wesson Match Rifle | 1849 | Edwin Wesson (older brother of Daniel Wesson) | Edwin J. Stanclift | America | AF.43490 | |
| | Daguerreotype of six miners | 1849-1860 | Unknown | Waterbury Companies, Inc. | Western America | PG.75.17.907 | |
| | Photomicrograph of a Fly's Probiscus | 1850s | Dr. John W. Draper and his sons | | New York | PG.72.72.B123 | |
| | Hillotype of Westkill Village, New York | 1850s-1860s | Levi Hill | | New York | PG.003999.01 | |
| | Man in Firefighter's Uniform | 1850s-1860s | Wyman & Co. | Unknown firefighter | Either Massachusetts or Washington D.C. | PG.68.93 | |
| | Aqueduct Bridge from Georgetown College grounds | 1850s-1870s | Titian Ramsey Peale | Jacqueline Hoffmire | Washington D.C. | PG.66.25A.45 | |
| | Arrowheads | 1850s-1870s | Titian Ramsey Peale | | America | PG.66.25.59 | |
| | City view with Old State Department | 1850s-1870s | Titian Ramsey Peale | Jacqueline Hoffmire | Washington D.C. | PG.66.25A.32 | |
| | Creek | 1850s-1870s | Titian Ramsey Peale | | America | PG.66.22.14 | |
| | Fossils | 1850s-1870s | Titian Ramsey Peale | | America | PG.66.23.32 | |
| | Rock Creek | 1850s-1870s | Titian Ramsey Peale | | Washington D.C. | PG.66.25A.82 | |
| | Rock Creek DC | 1850s-1870s | Titian Ramsey Peale | Jacqueline Hoffmire | Washington D.C. | PG.66.24.28 | |
| | Match Rifle | 1850 | W. Bodenheimer | Ralph G. Packard | America | AF.43491 | |
| | Hillotype, print of woman and deer | 1850 | Levi Hill | | New York | PG.003999.50 | |
| | Hillotype, Print of man fallen from horse | 1851 | Levi Hill | | New York | PG.003999.43 | |
| | Patent model loom for Weaving Piled Fabrics | January 14, 1851 | Erastus Brigham Bigelow | Unknown | Massachusetts | TE.T11411.014 | |
| | Chief Kutchekaitika | 1851-1852 | Thomas M. Easterly | | St. Louis | PG.003974.14 | |
| | San Francisco Harbor from Rincon Hill one of five plates that form a panorama | 1852 | William Shew | | San Francisco | PG.000159 | |
| | San Francisco Harbor from Rincon Hill one of five plates that form a panorama | 1852 | William Shew | | San Francisco | PG.000159.1 | |
| | San Francisco Harbor from Rincon Hill one of five plates that form a panorama | 1852 | William Shew | | San Francisco | PG.000159.2 | |
| | San Francisco Harbor from Rincon Hill one of five plates that form a panorama | 1852 | William Shew | | San Francisco | PG.000159.3 | |
| | San Francisco Harbor from Rincon Hill one of five plates that form a panorama | 1852 | William Shew | | San Francisco | PG.000159.4 | |
| | San Francisco Harbor from Rincon Hill one of five plates that form a panorama | 1852 | William Shew | | San Francisco | PG.000159.5 | |
| | Sharps carbine used at the Raid at Harper's Ferry | 1853 | Sharps Rifle Manufacturing Company | Unnamed raider | Virginia | AF.43496 | |
| | Daguerreotype of King Mongkut and Queen Debserin of Siam | 1854-1856 | Unknown | Franklin Pierce | Siam | PG.000222 | |
| | Sewing Machine Patent Model | June 27, 1854 | Walter Hunt | Clinton N. Hunt | New York | TE.T07781 | |
| | Portrait of Jefferson Davis | 1855-1860 | C. D. Fredericks & Co. | Jefferson Davis | New York City | 2013.0289.318 | |
| | Hair of the Presidents of the United States with other Persons of Distinction | 1855 | George Washington, John Adams, Thomas Jefferson, James Madison, James Monroe, John Quincy Adams, Andrew Jackson, Martin Van Buren, William Henry Harrison, John Tyler, James K. Polk, Zachary Taylor, Millard Fillmore, Franklin Pierce, Samuel Morse, Clark Mills, Generals Winfield Scott and Sam Houston, Senators Henry Clay and Jefferson Davis, and other luminaries | John Varden | America | PL.016157.a | |
| | Isaac Singer's Sewing Machine Patent Model | 1855 | Singer Company | Unknown | America | TE.T06133.000 | |
| | Model 1855 percussion pistol-carbine | 1855 | Springfield Armory | Unknown | Illinois | AF.43565 | |
| | Rooftops, buildings, houses with chimneys and a steeple | 1855 | Titian Ramsay Peale | Jacqueline Hoffmire | Washington D.C. | PG.66.21.01 | |
| | Volcanic Lever Action Navy Pistol | 1855 | Volcanic Repeating Arms | | Connecticut | AF.207721 | |
| | Volcanic pistol in .38 caliber | 1855 | Volcanic Repeating Arms | | Connecticut | AF.43570 | |
| | LeMat Revolver | 1856-1865 | Jean Alexandre LeMat | Unknown | France | AF.207718 | |
| | John Brown's Sharps carbine used at the Raid at Harper's Ferry | 1856 | Sharps Rifle Manufacturing Company | John Brown | Virginia | 1982.0025.01 | |
| | Portrait of Old Lady | 1857 | Paul Pretsch | | America | GA.07353a.01 | |
| | H. Burr's Cottage | May 1857 | Titian Ramsey Peale | | Washington D.C. | PG.66.21.35 | |
| | Washington Aqueduct, Bed of Reservoir | June 4, 1857 | Titian Ramsey Peale | | Washington D.C. | PG.66.22.05 | |
| | Abraham Lincoln's gold watch | 1858 | George Chatterton | Abraham Lincoln | United Kingdom | PL.219098.01 | |
| | Lefaucheux pinfire revolver | 1858 | Casimir Lefaucheux | Unknown Belgian buyer | France | AF.77204M | |
| | Enlisted Man's Forage Cap, Model 1858 | 1858 | United States Army | Unknown Union soldier | America | AF.25125.091 | |
| | Remington-Beals Model 1858 Navy Revolver | 1858 | Remington Arms Company, Inc. | Unknown American Navy soldier | North Carolina | AF.209341 | |
| | Six-piece coffee and tea service | October 27, 1858 | Unknown | Joanna L. Howard | Massachusetts | 2013.0193.03 | |
| | Engraving of "Caragnus esculentus, Doliodon carolinus, Chorinemus lanceolatus, Chloroscombrus cambraeus, Argyreiosus capillaris, Vomer setapinnis" | 1859 | John H. Richard | U.S. Department of the Interior | America | 2009.0115.080 | |
| | La Mort de Cesar | 1859 | Jean Leon Gerome | Unknown | France | GA.16566.01 | |
| | Percussion Revolver Patent Model | 1859 | Thomas Bailey | | North Carolina | AF.252529 | |
| | Wooden George Washington plaque | November 14, 1859 | American Bank | Unknown | Virginia | 2011.0013.01 | |
| | Bearded Man in Uniform | 1860s | Unknown | | Washington D.C. | PG.68.79 | |
| | Washington Aqueduct, tunnel leading to reservoir | 1860s | Titian Ramsey Peale | | Washington D.C. | PG.66.22.16 | |
| | Dynamometre pour les Forces [Dynamometer] | 1860-1871 | Robert & Collin | | France | 1978.0874.03 | |
| | J.E.B. Stuart's Tranter revolver | 1860 | William Tranter | J.E.B. Stuart | United Kingdom | AF.245168.106A | |
| | J.E.B. Stuart's Tranter revolver case | 1860 | William Tranter | J.E.B. Stuart | United Kingdom | AF.245168.106B | |
| | Henry's Patent Model 1860 Lever Action Rimfire Rifle | 1860 | New Haven Arms Co. | Ralph G. Packard | Connecticut | AF.43502 | |
| | McClellan's Colt Model 1860 Army Revolver's | 1860 | Colt Manufacturing Company | George B. McClellan | America | 32017A and 32017B | |
| | Abraham Lincoln's Office Suit | Before 1861 | Unknown tailor | Abraham Lincoln | America | COLL.ALSUIT.005004 | |
| | Ulysses S. Grant's field glasses | Before 1861 | Unknown | Ulysses S. Grant | America | AF.77336M | |
| | "Hunter" Double-Barreled 12 Gauge Shotgun used by James W. Jackson to kill Elmer E. Ellsworth | Before May 24, 1861 | Unknown | James W. Jackson | Virginia | AF.202728 | |
| | Berdan's Sharpshooter's hat | 1861-1864 | United States Army | 1st United States Sharpshooters | America | AF.24939.103 | |
| | Ambrotype of a Confederate soldier | 1861-1865 | Thomas Painter Collins | | Massachusetts | PG.004697 | |
| | Colt Model 1849 Pocket Revolver | 1861 | Colt Manufacturing Company | Charles Bremner Hogg Jackson | Connecticut | 1980.0399.0703 | |
| | Mary Todd Lincoln's Dress | 1861 | Elizabeth Keckly | Mary Todd Lincoln | America | PL.033280E | |
| | Zouave Uniform | 1861 | United States Army | 5th New York Volunteer Infantry | New York | AF.24954.01 | |
| | Emancipation Proclamation Inkstand | 1862 | United States Department of War | Major Thomas Eckert | America | PL.244699.02 | |
| | Henry Presentation Rifle | 1862 | New Haven Arms Company | Abraham Lincoln | Connecticut | AF.67880M | |
| | Cosmopolitan Carbine patent model | 1862 | Edward Gwyn and Abner Campbell | Unknown | Ohio | AF.252575 | |
| | Ulysses S. Grant's Letter from Fort Donelson | February 16, 1862 | Ulysses S. Grant | Simon Bolivar Buckner | Tennessee | AF.18769 | |
| | Remington 1863 Contract Rifle | 1863 | Remington Arms Company, Inc. | | America | AF.22827 | |
| | Sheridan Presentation Colt M1861 Navy Revolvers | 1863 | Colt Manufacturing Company | Philip H. Sheridan | America | AF.35281A and AF.35281B | |
| | Ulysses Grant's Congressional gold medal | Before December 17, 1863 | United States Congress | Ulysses Grant | America | AF.93729 | |
| | List of Presidents of United States (before 1864) | Before 1864 | John Brenton Copp | Copp Family | New England | DL.006791.03.032 | |
| | Admiral David G. Farragut's service cap | Before 1864 | United States Navy | David G. Farragut | America | AF.17392 | |
| | Sword Voted to Ulysses S. Grant at the Metropolitan Fair | Before April 23, 1864 | Tiffany & Co. | Ulysses S. Grant | Connecticut | AF.2991A | |
| | A carte-de-visite of Andrew H. Foote | 1864 | Unknown | Andrew H. Foote | America | 2018.0124.05d | |
| | A carte-de-visite album containing photographs of Ambrose Burnside, William Lloyd Shaw and Robert Gould | 1864 | Unknown | Unknown | America | 2018.0124.05e | |
| | Civil War draft notice for Edrick Frear | April 7, 1864 | United States Army | Edrick Frear | America | PL.223929.01 | |
| | Spotsylvania Stump | May 12, 1864 | Spotsylvania Court House, Virginia | United States War Department | Virginia | AF.4435 | |
| | Christian Abraham Fleetwood's Medal of Honor | September 29, 1864 | US Army | Christian Abraham Fleetwood | Washington D.C. | AF.046054.1 | |
| | Ulysses Grant's Camp Chair | Before 1865 | Unknown | Ulysses Grant | America | 1985.0713.01 | |
| | Abraham Lincoln's Tophat | Before 1865 | J. Y. Davis | Abraham Lincoln | Washington D.C. | PL.9321 | |
| | Ulysses Grant's chair (left), Robert E. Lee's chair (right), and table during the surrender at Appomattox Courthouse | Before April 9, 1865 | Unknown | Unknown | Virginia | PL.010517, PL.015820, PL.039767 | |
| | A flag of truce | Before April 9, 1865 | Unknown | George Armstrong Custer | Virginia | PL.039765 | |
| | Mr. J. L. Roos's ticket to Ford's Theatre | Before April 14, 1865 | H. Clay Ford | J. L. Roos | Washington D.C. | PL.046805 | |
| | Percussion sporting rifle | 1865 | N. & N. Gilbert Whitmore | Ulysses S. Grant | Massachusetts | AF.3009 | |
| | Sword Presented to Leonard A. Harris | 1865 | Hartley & Graham Schuyler | Leonard A. Harris | New York City | AF.58705M | |
| | Ulysses S. Grant to Robert E. Lee, Battlefield Copy of Terms of Surrender | April 9, 1865 | Ulysses Grant | Robert E. Lee | Virginia | 2012.0214.04 | |
| | Andrew Johnson's Pardon letter to former Virginian soldier John Walden | May 29, 1865 | Andrew Johnson | John Walden | Washington D.C. | PL.020328 | |
| | House with snow on roof/ Arlington House | After 1865 | Titian Ramsay Peale | Unknown | Washington D.C. | PG.66.25.08-PG.66.25.09 | |
| | Caselli Telediagraph fax image of Joseph Barbiere Jr. | 1867 | Giovanni Caselli | James W. III | Pennsylvania | 1992.0292.01 | |
| | Bird's-Eye View of Washington, D.C | 1868 | Titian Ramsay Peale | Jacqueline Hoffmire | Washington D.C. | PG.66.23.03 | |
| | A dead stagecoach robber in Tucson | 1870-1890 | H. Buehman | | Arizona | 2013.0289.332 | |
| | A dead stagecoach robber in Tucson | 1870-1890 | H. Buehman | | Arizona | 2013.0289.335 | |
| | Buckskin coat worn by George Armstrong Custer | 1870 | Unknown | George Armstrong Custer | America | AF.013044 | |
| | 22.83 Dollars in silver | 1870 | Leopold Kuh | | Nevada | 1986.0985.0002 | |
| | Oil-wick miner's Lamp Patent Model | May 23, 1871 | William C. Winifred | Unknown | America | AG.MHI-MN-9737 | |
| | George Armstrong Custer's gaunlet | Before 1872 | Unknown | George Armstrong Custer | America | AF.13043 | |
| | Toledo 1873 Presentation sword | 1873 | Toledo, Spain | Ulysses S. Grant | Spain | AF.16077 | |
| | Photograph of the U.S.S. Constitution | 1874 | United States Navy | | Philadelphia | AF.59696-N | |
| | Alexander Graham Bell Experimental Telephone | 1876 | Alexander Graham Bell | | Unknown | EM.252599 | |
| | An Atlantic and Pacific Telegraph Company telegram sent by U.S. Grant to William Wheeler | December 10, 1876 | U.S. Grant | William Wheeler | New Orleans | PL.227739.1868.L02 | |
| | Evans New Model Lever Action Carbine | 1877 | Warren R. Evans | Dr. Leonard Carmichael | Maine | AF.65773M | |
| | Address of Ulysses S. Grant | 1877 | Chamber of Commerce | Ulysses S. Grant | America | PL.003178 | |
| | Dental Impression Cup | January 14, 1879 | Michael E. Toomey | Unknown | England | 2012.0165.699 | |
| | U.S. Army canteen | 1880-1898 | U.S. Army | Unknown U.S. soldier | America | AF.65368M | |
| | Note from Thomas A. Edison to Joseph E. Hinds | November 1881 | Thomas A. Edison | Joseph E. Hinds | America | EM.180945 | |
| | Jesse James | April 3, 1882 | R. Uhlman | | Missouri | 2018.0103.0004 | |
| | Theodore Roosevelt's chaps | 1884 | Theodore Roosevelt | | Western America | PL.252493.01 | |
| | Springfield Armory Model 1888/1884 "Trapdoor" Rifle with Ramrod Bayonet | 1884-1891 | Springfield Armory | | Massachusetts | AF.65772MA | |
| | Winchester Model 1886 Lever Action Rifle | 1886-1891 | Winchester Repeating Arms Company | | Connecticut | 2009.0081.01 | |
| | Tobacco Box with Photograph and Lock of Hair | 1895 | Mary Anne Hammond Washington | Unknown | Georgia | DL.071656.0001 | |
| | Map of Canada | 1899 | Isadore Warshaw | Rand McNally & Co. | America | NMAH.AC.0060.S01.01.Maps | |
| | Ukrainian immigrant's songbook | 1899 | Unknown Ukrainian immigrant | | Russian Empire (modern-day Ukraine) | 1982.0219.01 | |

== 1900s ==
| Image | Title | Year | Creator | Original owner | Location | I.D. Number | Sources |
|---|---|---|---|---|---|---|---|
| | Rai stone | 1900s | Unknown | Chase Manhattan Bank | Federated States of Micronesia | 1979.1263.00428 | |
| | Spanish copy of a Smith & Wesson revolver | 1900 | Orbea Brothers | | Spain | AF.7962 | |
| | U.S.S. Illinois & H.M.S. London | 1902 | Nicholas J. Quirk | | Chicago | 1996.0197.069 | |
| | 1902 White steam automobile | 1902 | White Motor Company | | Cleveland | TR.309497 | |
| | Remington Model 8 Semiautomatic Rifle | 1906 | Remington Arms Company, Inc. And John M. Browning | Theodore Roosevelt | North Carolina | AF.262195 | |
| | A Lucky Bag | 1910 | Hassan Cigarettes | | New York | 1982.0091.073 | |
| | Alfredo De Oro cigarette card | 1910 | Mecca Cigarettes | | New York | 1982.0568.168 | |
| | Bert Keyes cigarette card | 1910 | Hassan Cigarettes | | New York | 1982.0091.024 | |
| | Canisius College cigarette card | 1910 | Murad Cigarettes | | New York | 1982.0091.113 | |
| | Charles "Cowboy" Wetson cigarette card | 1910 | Mecca Cigarettes | | New York | 1996.0213.203 | |
| | Charles J. Bacon Jr. cigarette card | 1910 | Hassan Cigarettes | | New York | 1982.0091.040 | |
| | Dartmouth College cigarette card | 1910 | Murad Cigarettes | | New York | 1982.0091.135 | |
| | Frankie Neil cigarette card | 1910 | Hassan Cigarettes | | New York | 1982.0091.026 | |
| | George Butler Sutton cigarette card | 1910 | Mecca Cigarettes | | New York | 1996.0213.207 | |
| | Harry Stone cigarette card | 1910 | Hassan Cigarettes | | New York | 1982.0091.021 | |
| | His Favorite Brand | 1910 | Hassan Cigarettes | | New York | 1982.0091.076 | |
| | Jack Goodman cigarette card | 1910 | Hassan Cigarettes | | New York | 1982.0091.023 | |
| | Jack Johnson 1910 cigarette card | 1910 | Hassan Cigarettes | | New York | 1996.0213.200 | |
| | Jack Johnson 1910 cigarette card | 1910 | Hassan Cigarettes | | New York | 1982.0091.020 | |
| | Jack "Twin" Sullivan cigarette card | 1910 | Mecca Cigarettes | | New York | 2000.3001.082 | |
| | Jimmy Gardiner cigarette card | 1910 | The Khedivial Co. | | New York City | 1982.0091.007 | |
| | Johnny Frayne cigarette card | 1910 | The Khedivial Co. | | New York City | 1982.0091.004 | |
| | John L. Sullivan cigarette card | 1910 | Allen & Ginter | Edward J. Polacik | Richmond, Virginia | 2010.0002.01 | |
| | North-Western College cigarette card | 1910 | Murad Cigarette | | New York | 1982.0091.130 | |
| | Lawrence University cigarette card | 1910 | Murad Cigarette | | New York | 1982.0091.092 | |
| | Lawson Robertson cigarette card | 1910 | Mecca Cigarette | | New York | 1982.0091.051 | |
| | Lehigh University cigarette card | 1910 | Murad Cigarette | | New York | 1982.0091.144 | |
| | Leo Houck cigarette card | 1910 | The Khedivial Co. | | New York City | 1982.0091.010 | |
| | Melvin W. Sheppard cigarette card | 1910 | Hassan Cigarettes | | New York | 1982.0091.062 | |
| | Occidental College cigarette card | 1910 | Murad Cigarette | | New York | 1982.0091.114 | |
| | Occidental College cigarette card | 1910 | Murad Cigarette | | New York | 1982.0091.114.1 | |
| | Ohio University cigarette card | 1910 | Murad Cigarette | | New York | 2004.3001.06 | |
| | Packey McFarland cigarette card | 1910 | The Khedivial Co. | | New York City | 1982.0091.008 | |
| | Queen of the Ranch | 1910 | Hassan Cigarettes | | New York | 1982.0091.078 | |
| | Rutgers College cigarette card | 1910 | Murad Cigarette | | New York | 1982.0091.124 | |
| | Sailor Burke cigarette card | 1910 | Mecca Cigarettes | | New York | 1982.0091.039.1 | |
| | St. Lawrence University cigarette card | 1910 | Murad Cigarette | | New York | 1982.0091.093.1 | |
| | Throwing The Lasso | 1910 | Hassan Cigarettes | | New York | 1982.0091.072 | |
| | United States Naval Academy cigarette card | 1910 | Murad Cigarettes | | New York | 1999.3052.173 | |
| | University of Montana cigarette card | 1910 | Murad Cigarettes | | New York | 1982.0091.145 | |
| | University of Notre Dame cigarette card | 1910 | Hassan Cigarettes | | New York | 1996.0213.202 | |
| | University of Notre Dame cigarette card | 1910 | Hassan Cigarettes | | New York | 1982.0091.117 | |
| | Valentine "Knockout" Brown cigarette card | 1910 | Hassan Cigarettes | | New York | 2000.3001.098 | |
| | W. J. Kramer cigarette card | 1910 | Hassan Cigarettes | | New York | 1982.0091.047 | |
| | Warren C. Fielding cigarette card | 1910 | Hassan Cigarettes | | New York | 1982.0091.046 | |
| | Western Reserve University cigarette card | 1910 | Murad Cigarettes | | New York | 2004.3001.10 | |
| | Young Loughery (Thomas Loughlin) cigarette card | 1910 | Hassan Cigarettes | | New York | 1982.0091.014 | |
| | Woodrow Wilson nutcracker | 1912 | Unknown | Ralph E. Becker | America | PL.227739.1912.X01 | |
| | Electric Tuning Fork | After 1913 | Standard Scientific Company | Unknown | New York | PH.315638 | |
| | An autochrome of the Siam Pavilion at the Panama-Pacific International Exposition | Between February 20 to December 4, 1915 | Unknown | Gertrude E. Warner | San Francisco | PG.003565.05 | |
| | Synthetic Indigo Meister Lucius & Bruning 100%, From Cargo of Deutschland on her Second Trip. | 1916 | Meister Lucius & Bruning | L. A. Metz | German Empire | 2017.0234.09 | |
| | Sir Douglas Haig's British Field Marshal cap | Before 1917 | British Army | Sir Douglas Haig | United Kingdom | AF.26353 | |
| | Gillette U.S. Service Razor Set | 1917 | Gillette Safety Razor Company | United States Government | Boston | 1979.1175.107 | |
| | On the Trail of the Hun - St. Mihiel Drive | 1917 | William James Aylward | United States War Department | Grand Est | AF.25662 | |
| | Doughboy uniform | 1917-1918 | United States Army | Unknown U.S. soldier | America | 1977.0082.06 | |
| | Navy Nurse Corps Indoor Uniform | 1917-1918 | United States Navy Nurse Corps | | America | 1998.0165.83.01 | |
| | USS Michigan and Crew | 1917-1918 | Unknown | | | 1983.0486.01 | |
| | Turkish Army Medical backpack | 1917-1922 | Ottoman Army | Unknown Turkish medic | Either the German Empire or the Ottoman Empire | MG.M-07166 | |
| | P08 Luger Semiautomatic Pistol | Before 1918 | DWM | Glen John Burkhardt | German Empire | AF.76557M | |
| | Alvin C. York by Joseph Cummings Chase | 1918 | Joseph Cummings Chase | Unknown | Grand Est | AF.46205 | |
| | Colt M1911 No. 388733 | 1918 | Colt Manufacturing Company | U.S. Army | Hartford | 2005.0005.02 | |
| | Field No 1, Issoudun | 1918 | J. Andre Smith | United States War Department | Centre-Val de Loire | AF.25983 | |
| | Firing a Big Gun | 1918 | Capt. Harry Townsend | United States War Department | France | AF.26106 | |
| | Portrait of a German POW | 1918 | William James Aylward | United States War Department | France | AF.25658 | |
| | German Medical Orderly's Belt | 1918 | Imperial German Army | | German Empire | MG.M-02379 | |
| | Mopping up | 1918 | Capt. Harry Townsend | United States War Department | France | AF.26112 | |
| | Portrait of General John. J. Pershing | 1918 | Joseph Cummings Chase | United States War Department | France | AF.37718B | |
| | Shipyard Plate Puller | 1918 | Baltimore Dry Dock and Shipbuilding Company | Walter Davis | Maryland | TR.336914 | |
| | Sunday Morning at Cunel | 1918 | Harvey Thomas Dunn | United States War Department | Grand Est | AF.25714 | |
| | The Air Raid | 1918 | Harvey Thomas Dunn | United States War Department | France | AF.25715 | |
| | The Sniper | 1918 | Harvey Thomas Dunn | United States War Department | France | AF.25725 | |
| | Scoped M1903 Springfield rifle | 1918 | Springfield Armory | War Department. Bureau of Ordnance | Massachusetts | AF.37262 | |
| | Tanks in Action | 1918 | Capt. Harry Townsend | United States War Department | France | AF.26132 | |
| | USS Leviathan | 1918 | Unknown | Otis B. Harrington | Atlantic Ocean | 1981.0235.01 | |
| | American graves at Ménil-la-Tour | June 1918 | J. A. Smith | United States War Department | France | AF.25914 | |
| | Croix Blanche Farm August 1918 | August 1918 | Rudolph Stanley-Brown | | France | AF.59721M | |
| | HMS Vampire encircling USS Shawmut with smoke screen | September 1918 | Unknown | United States War Department | North Sea | 2008.3049.02 | |
| | Rue Beaudriere | July 15, 1918 | Walter Jack Duncan | United States War Department | France | AF.25698 | |
| | World War 1 photograph album | 1918-1919 | Harry A. Spencer | | France | 2009.0129.01 | |
| | The Bassens Docks | 1919 | William James Aylward | United States War Department | Bordeaux | AF.25670 | |
| | Taxidermied body of Cher Ami | June 13, 1919 | France | United States War Department | France | AF.30714 | |
| | Ku Klux Klan hood | 1920s | Unknown | | Southern United States | 1992.0401.02 | |
| | 1926 Ford Model T roadster | 1926 | Ford Motor Company | John T. Sickler | Michigan | TR.333777 | |
| | Calvin P. Titus' citations for the Congressional Medal of Honor for his acts in the Boxer Rebellion | November 13, 1927 | United States Congress | Calvin P. Titus | America | AF.66656M | |
| | Thompson Model 1928 Submachine Gun | 1928 | John Taliaferro Thompson | U.S. Postal Service | Cleveland | 1986.0698.02 | |
| | Numa | 1930s | W. Hurley Ashby | | America | PG.004086.01 | |
| | The Yawn | 1930s | W. Hurley Ashby | | America | PG.004086.06 | |
| | Autograph of Honus Wagner | 1935 | Unknown fan | Honus Wagner | Pennsylvania | 1984.0135.01 | |
| | German Field Marshal Werner von Blomberg's Baton | 1935 | Nazi Germany | Werner von Blomberg | Nazi Germany | AF.319919.01 | |
| | Judy Garland's Ruby Slippers | 1939 | Adrian | | Los Angeles | 1979.1230.01 | |
| | German MP40 | 1940-1944 | Erma Werke | Wehrmacht | Nazi Germany | AF.53278 | |
| | Censored letter from Issei, Shinsuke Sugimoto | May 10, 1942 | Shinsuke Sugimoto | Misao Sugimoto | Los Angeles | 2016.0280.23 | |
| | 1778-1943 Americans Will Always Fight for Liberty poster | 1943 | United States Office of War Information | | Washington D.C. | AF.56184 | |
| | United States Model 2A1 flamethrower | 1944 | U.S. Department of Defense | | America | AF.65355M | |
| | A letter from Kazuo Masuda to his family while in the Army, Italy | August 2, 1944 | Kazuo Masuda | Kazuo Masuda's family | Fascist Italy | 2015.0105.014 | |
| | Testimonial, U.S. Naval Training Center, Bainbridge, MD, 1944 | September 8, 1944 | Captain A. S. Freedman | Brownie Henry Kaczmarek | Maryland | AF.59924-N(8) | |
| | DSC Citation, Posthumous Award of Distinguished Service Cross for Kazuo Masuda, Headquarters 5th Army | August 4, 1945 | 5th Army | | America | 2015.0105.006 | |
| | Lunch Counter and four stools from the Greensboro sit-ins | 1950s | F. W. Woolworth Company | | North Carolina | COLL.LUNCHCTR.005006, 1994.0156.01,1994.0156.02, 1994.0156.03, 1994.0156.04,1994.0156.05 | |
| | Ashtray from the SS United States | 1950 | US Department of Commerce | | America | TR.335564.09A | |
| | Berlin Wall fragment | 1961 | East Germany | | East Germany | 2011.0015.01 | |
| | Phyllis Diller's Gag File | 1962-1994 | Art Steel Company, Inc. | Phyllis Diller | New York City | 2003.0289.01.01 | |
| | Colt Stagecoach Autoloader Semiautomatic Rimfire Rifle | 1965 | Colt Manufacturing Company | | America | AF.81234M | |
| | Hat worn by Harrison Ford in Indiana Jones and the Last Crusade | 1988 | Joanna Johnston and Anthony Powell | Lucasfilm Ltd. | City of London | 1989.0323.02 | |
| | Slugger's baseball bat | 1990s | Carlos “Charlie” Díaz | | New York City | 2019.0214.02 | |
| | 125th anniversary Colt Single Action Army Revolver | 1993 | Colt Manufacturing Company | | Hartford | AF.68589MA | |
| | Flight 93 GTE Airfone | 1996 | Boeing Commercial Airplanes | United Airlines | Wisconsin | 2004.0142.19 | |

== 2000s ==
| Image | Title | Year | Creator | Original owner | Location | I.D. Number | Sources |
|---|---|---|---|---|---|---|---|
| | Letter from Elizabeth Shigekawa to Roger Shimomura, January 28, 2007 | January 28, 2007 | Elizabeth Shigekawa | Professor Roger Shimomura | California | 2016.3086.280 | |
| | Hazmat suit, mask, and black shoes worn by Walter White in the T.V. show "Breaking Bad" | 2008 | AMC | | New Mexico | 2015.0317.01, 2015.0317.12, and 2015.0317.08 | |
| | Michelle Obama's inaugural dress | November 15, 2008 | Jason Wu | Michelle Obama | New York City | 2009.0071.01 | |
| | Secure Our Borders Now! | April 15, 2010 | Tea Party Patriots Inc. | | Washington, D.C. | 2010.0068.03 | |
| | General David Petraeus | Before September 11, 2011 | Marco Grob | Time Magazine | America | 2012.0222.0011 | |
| | Ibtihaj Muhammad's Fencing jacket from the 2016 Rio Olympic Games | 2016 | Unknown | Ibtihaj Muhammad | Either Brazil or America | 2016.0350.01 | |
| | Ibtihaj Muhammad's fencing mask from the 2016 Rio Olympic Games | 2016 | Unknown | Ibtihaj Muhammad | Either Brazil or America | 2016.0350.03 | |
| | Naomi Wadler's scarf | March 24, 2018 | Unknown | Naomi Wadler | Washington D.C. | 2018.0099.01 | |

== Undated ==
| Image | Title | Creator | Original owner | Location | I.D. Number | Sources |
|---|---|---|---|---|---|---|
| | Athletic Shoes Found in Sonoran Desert | Unknown | Unknown Mexican immigrant | Arizona | 2015.0070.15 | |
| | Commemorative Colt Frontier Scout Revolver | Colt Manufacturing Company | Unknown frontier scout | Nevada | AF.75736MA | |
| | Human skull with trepanning | Unknown | The Medical and Chirurgical Faculty of the State of Maryland | Maryland | MG.302606.262 | |
| | Plate | Unknown | | America | CE.68.88V | |
| | Plate | Unknown | | America | CE.389356 | |
| | Revovler | Colt Manufacturing Company | U.S. Navy | America | AF.31203(1) | |
| | Scimitar | Unknown | | Middle East | AF.16092 | |
