= Joseph Chase =

Joseph Chase may refer to:

- Joseph Cummings Chase (1878–1965), American artist
- J. Smeaton Chase (1864–1923), English-born American author, traveler and photographer
