= Anthea M. Hartig =

American museum director (born 1964)

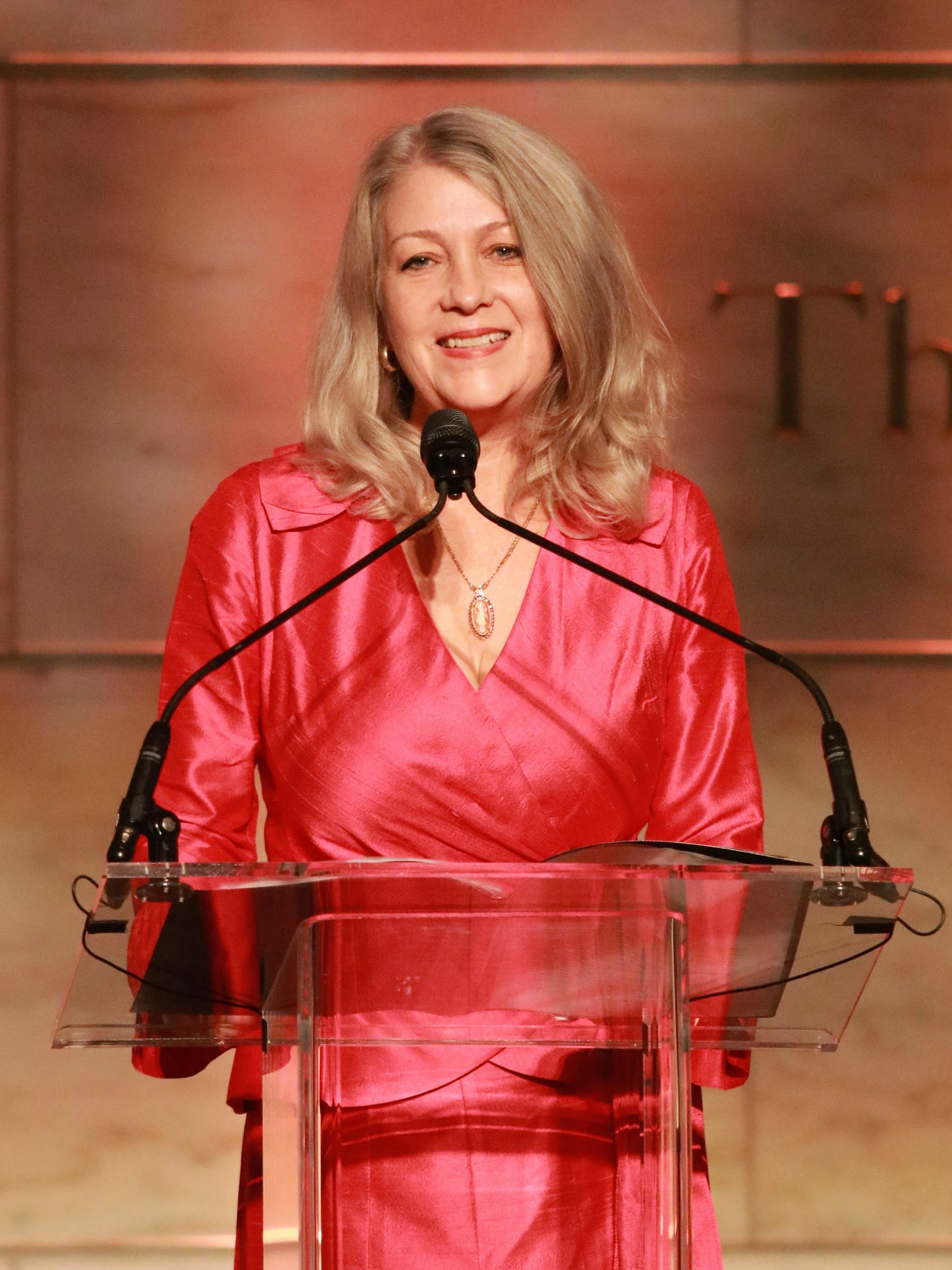
- Hartig in 2022
- Born: 1964 (age 61–62); Pomona Valley, California, U.S.
- Education: University of California, Los Angeles (BA); University of California, Riverside (MA, PhD)
- Occupations: Historian; educator; cultural and historic preservation specialist; museum director

Anthea Marie Hartig (born 1964) is an American historian and museum administrator who is the director of the Smithsonian Institution's National Museum of American History in Washington, D.C. The Smithsonian trustees appointed Hartig as director beginning in 2019, succeeding John Gray. She is the museum's first female director.

With a background in historic preservation and museums, Hartig was earlier the director of the California Historical Society.

== Early life and career ==
Hartig was born in 1964 into a family with a long history in California. Her great-grandfather was a sheep rancher near Chino, California, and her grandfather and father both lived in the Pomona Valley in Southern California. Her mother's family, however, is largely based in Rhode Island. Hartig was raised in Rancho Cucamonga in San Bernardino County, California, where she attended and graduated from the local public school system.

Hartig received a bachelor's degree in history from the University of California, Los Angeles, and spent part of her undergraduate career studying at the College of William & Mary in Williamsburg, Virginia. She received her master's degree in public history from the University of California, Riverside in 1989 and her Ph.D. in American architectural history and material culture studies from UC-Riverside in 2001.

Hartig worked as a municipal preservation planner for more than 10 years, serving for a time as Senior Planner with the city of Riverside, California. She also founded her own preservation consulting firm.

Dr. Hartig was an assistant professor of history at La Sierra University from 2000 to 2005, teaching history and cultural studies. She also taught graduate courses in historic preservation at UC-Riverside. From 2001 to 2005, she also served as chair of the California State Historic Resources Commission.

== Preservation career ==
In 2005, Hartig was appointed director of the Western Office of the National Trust for Historic Preservation. This was not only the Trust's largest geographic region but also its most architecturally, culturally, and historically diverse.

After six years with the National Trust, Hartig was named executive director and chief executive officer of the California Historical Society (CHS). CHS was struggling as an organization and museum. During Hartig's tenure, she raised $20 million in a capital fundraising campaign, launched the organization's first digital library, and significantly raised attendance at CHS museum exhibits from a few thousand to more than 100,000. She won funding from the state of California, which had not contributed to the organization before, and quadrupled the CHS annual operating budget to $5.2 million.

=== National Museum of American History ===
On December 12, 2018, the Smithsonian Institution announced it had appointed Hartig as the director of the National Museum of American History, succeeding six-year incumbent John Gray. She is the first woman to hold this position at the museum.

=== White House scrutiny and congressional testimony (2025–2026) ===
In July 2026, the White House Domestic Policy Council released a report, Saving America's Story, prepared pursuant to President Donald Trump's 2025 executive order "Restoring Truth and Sanity to American History", that accused the National Museum of American History of "ideological capture" and criticized Hartig by name, characterizing her as an activist pursuing an agenda contrary to the museum's founding purpose. The report cited Hartig's public statements describing history as a "prime tool of social justice" as evidence for its conclusions.

On July 21, 2026, Hartig testified before the House Oversight Subcommittee on Delivering on Government Efficiency, becoming the first senior Smithsonian official publicly questioned by Congress over the administration's campaign to reshape the institution. Rebutting Republican lawmakers' accusations that she sought to "rewrite" American history, Hartig testified that the museum's work is governed by Smithsonian standards of scholarship, accuracy, independence, and nonpartisanship. Three days later, Trump signed a further executive order, "Restoring Trust in the Smithsonian Institution", which asserted that the museum's leadership could not be trusted to present American history accurately and directed federal agencies to press for the changes identified in the report, including installing National Park Service signage outside the museum informing visitors of its findings.

== Other roles and honors ==
Hartig has served on the board of directors of a wide range of local, state, and national history and historic preservation organizations, including the California Council for the Promotion of History and the California Preservation Foundation. As of 2018, she also served as a cultural resources specialist for the California State Park and Recreation Commission.

Dr. Hartig has authored several books and a number of articles in academic and professional journals.

Hartig received the 2011 California Preservationist of the Year Award from the California Preservation Foundation in recognition of her contribution to the cause of historic preservation in California.

In October 2026, Hartig was elected to the American Academy of Arts and Sciences.

== Personal life ==
Hartig is the mother of two sons.
