= Roy Gussow =

American sculptor

Roy Gussow (November 12, 1918 – February 11, 2011) was an American abstract sculptor known for his public pieces often crafted from polished stainless steel. Examples of his work can be found outside the Xerox building in Rochester, New York, City Hall in Harrisburg, Pennsylvania, the New York City Family Court building in Manhattan, and the Tulsa Convention Center in Tulsa, Oklahoma.

== Biography ==
=== Early life ===
Gussow was born in Brooklyn, New York, on November 12, 1918, to Abraham and Mildred Gussow. He was one of three siblings. Gussow was Jewish. He enrolled at Farmingdale State College originally intending to pursue a career as a farmer, but switched majors and earned a bachelor's degree in landscape architecture in 1938.

=== Sculptor ===
He joined the United States Army during World War II. Gussow met painter George Kachergis while serving in France. Kachergis encouraged Gussow to enter the fields of art and design. He enrolled at the IIT Institute of Design in Chicago following the end of World War II and studied under cubist sculptor Alexander Archipenko. Archipenko took Gussow to Woodstock, New York, in 1946, where he attended summer school. He met his future wife, Mary Maynard, while in Woodstock.

Gussow taught sculpture and art at Bradley University in Illinois, the Colorado Springs Fine Arts Center and the North Carolina State University School of Design, now known as the College of Design, in Raleigh, North Carolina, as well as at The Pratt Institute in Brooklyn, NY, Columbia University, and the University of Pennsylvania. He returned to New York City, settling in Manhattan in 1962. In 1964, Gussow moved to Long Island City, becoming one of the first artists to take up residence in what was then an industrial section of the Queens neighborhood. Gussow created both his home and sculpture studio inside a former silver plating factory. He resided and worked in Long Island City for the rest of his life.

=== Works ===
Gussow assisted in the creation of Infinity, an abstract sculpture, designed by Jose de Rivera, which was dedicated outside the Smithsonian's Museum of History and Technology, now called the National Museum of American History, in 1967. The piece is one of the first abstract sculptures to be placed at a major public building in Washington D.C. The sculpture consists of a 16-foot long curved stainless steel ribbon placed atop a granite column. The piece, which stands 24 feet tall, is located at the entrance to the museum facing the National Mall.

In 1974, Gussow's "Three Forms 7-31-75" was dedicated outside of the New York City Family Court building at Lafayette and Leonard Streets in the Civic Center section of Lower Manhattan. The eight-feet tall sculpture, which has a mirror stainless steel finish like many of Russow's public works, stands on a two-foot base constructed of granite. The sculpture was removed in 2010 for restoration.

Gussow also created "Crystal," which was placed outside of city hall in Harrisburg, Pennsylvania, in 1983. Gussow designed "Crystal" as six "wedge-shaped facets" which reflect clouds as they float over the city of Harrisburg. This particular sculpture stands at seventeen feet tall.

Some examples of Gussow's other public sculptures can be found at North Carolina State University, outside the Xerox building in Rochester, New York, and the Civic Center in Tulsa, Oklahoma. His smaller works are housed at prominent museums, including the Brooklyn Museum, the Whitney Museum of Art, the Museum of Modern Art (MoMa) and the Guggenheim Museum.

Roy Gussow died of a heart attack in Long Island City, Queens, New York, on February 11, 2011, at the age of 92, where he lived for almost 50 years. His wife, Mary, died in 2004. He was survived by three daughters – Jill, Mimi and Olga – two grandchildren and three great-grandchildren. His daughter, Jill Gussow, is also an artist.
