= National Museum of American History =

Museum in Washington, D.C.

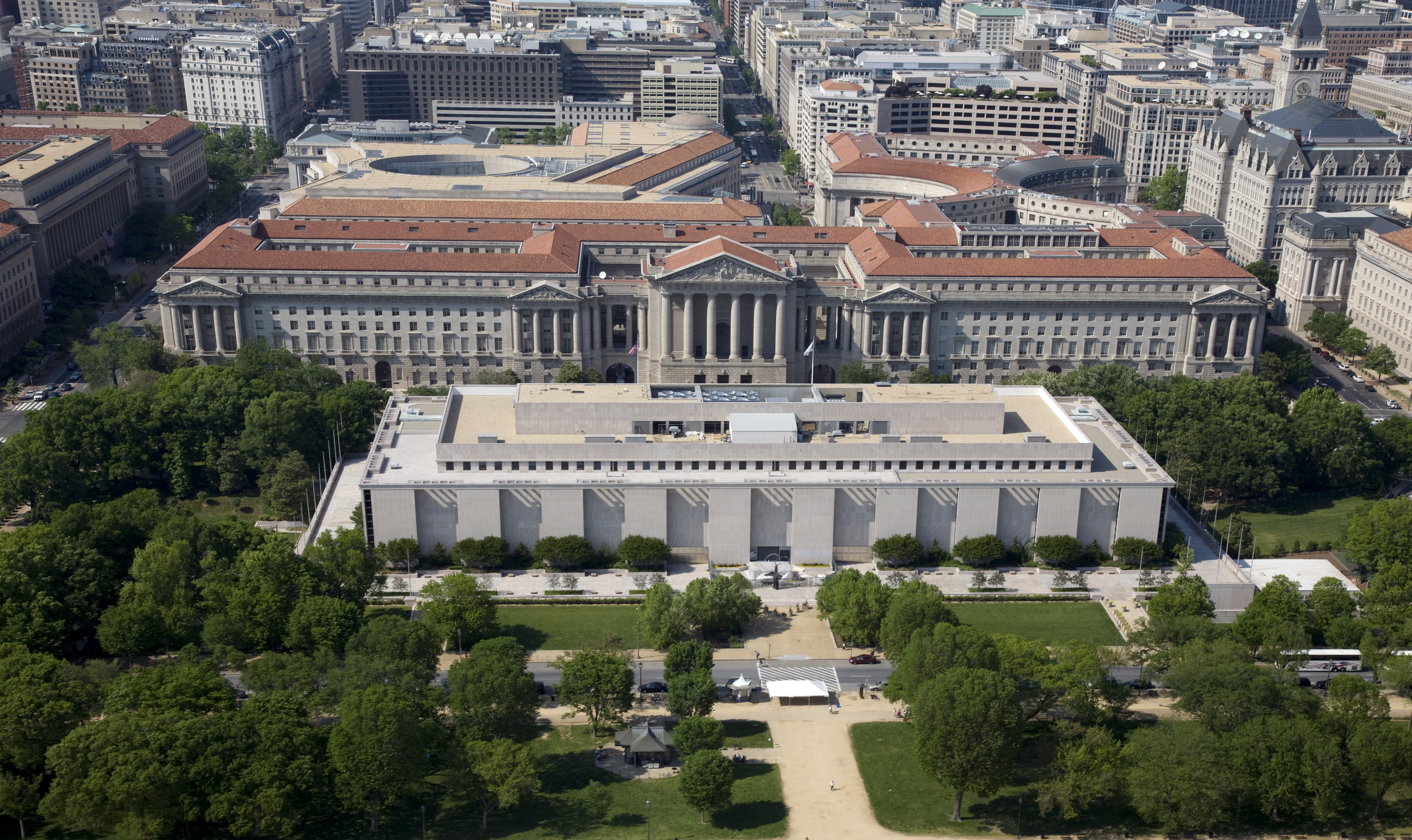
- Aerial view of the museum in 2010
- Established: 1964; 62 years ago
- Location: 1300 Constitution Ave. NW, Washington, D.C., U.S.
- Coordinates: 38°53′28″N 77°01′48″W
- Type: History museum
- Visitors: 2.1 million (2023)
- Director: Anthea M. Hartig
- Architect: McKim, Mead & White
- Public transit access: at Federal Triangle
- Website: americanhistory.si.edu

The National Museum of American History: Kenneth E. Behring Center is a historical museum in Washington, D.C. It collects, preserves, and displays the heritage of the United States in the areas of social, political, cultural, scientific, and military history. Among the items on display is the original Star-Spangled Banner. The museum is part of the Smithsonian Institution and located on the National Mall at 14th Street and Constitution Avenue NW in Washington, D.C.

In 2023, the museum received 2.1 million visitors, ranking the eighth-most visited museum in the U.S.

== History ==
The museum opened in 1964 as the Museum of History and Technology. It was one of the last structures designed by the renowned architectural firm McKim Mead & White. In 1980, the museum was renamed the National Museum of American History to represent its mission of the collection, care, study, and interpretation of objects that reflect the experience of the American people.

The museum site had previously held two temporary war buildings constructed in 1942.

In 1973, representatives of the Committee to Re-elect the President forced the museum to temporarily close the Right to Vote exhibit in advance of Richard Nixon's second inauguration. The exhibit had been designed by historian Edith Mayo.

In May 2012, John Gray became the new director. He retired from the post in May 2018 and was succeeded by Anthea M. Hartig who was previously chief executive of the California Historical Society.

=== Renovations ===
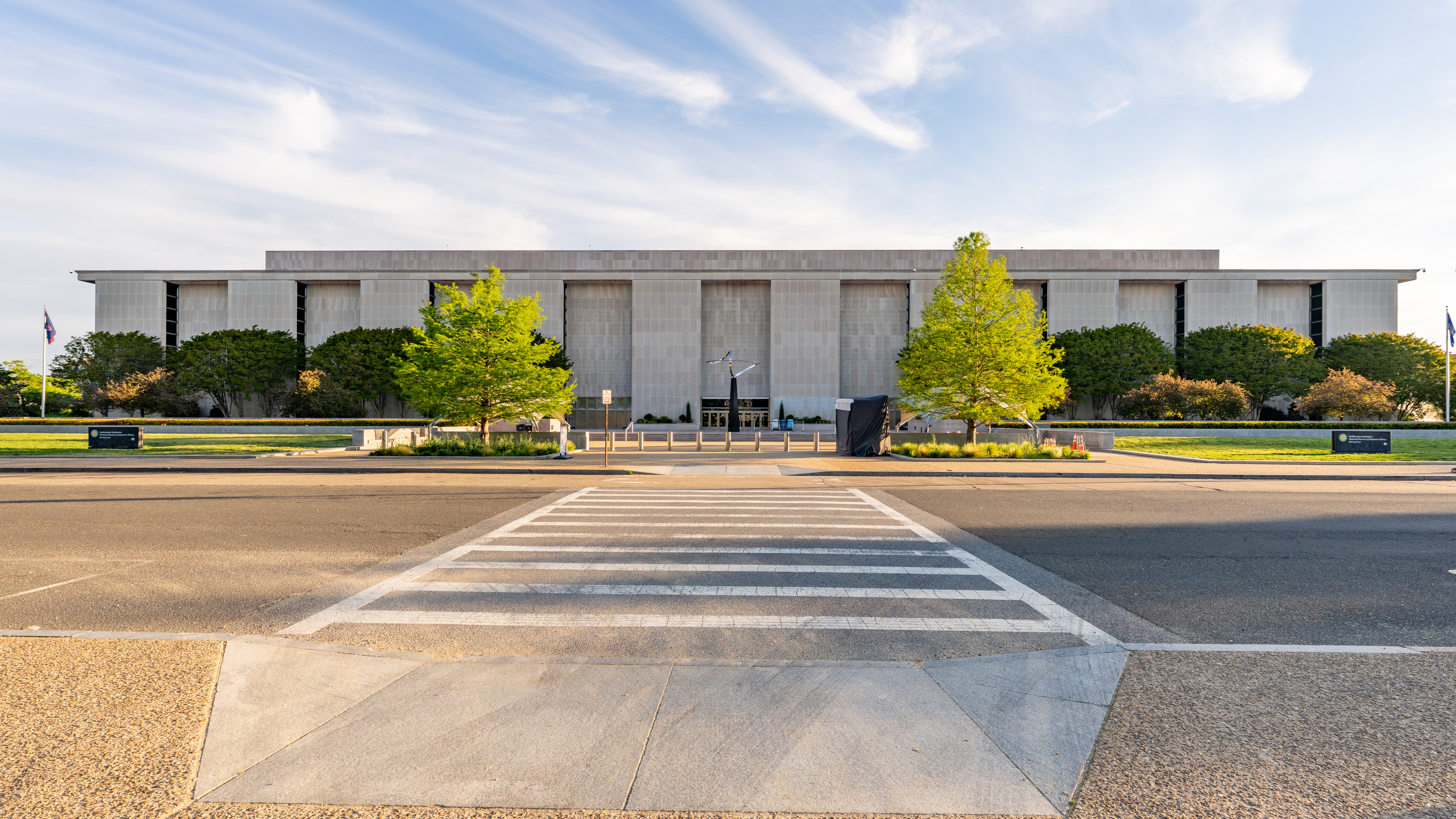
The south facade of the museum

The museum underwent an $85 million renovation from September 5, 2006, to November 21, 2008, during which time it was closed. Skidmore, Owings and Merrill provided the architecture and interior design services for the renovation, led by Gary Haney. Major changes made during the renovation include:

- A new, five-story sky-lit atrium, which is surrounded by displays of artifacts that showcase the breadth of the museum's collection.
- A new, grand staircase that links the museum's first and second floors.
- A new welcome center, and the addition of six landmark objects to orient visitors.
- New galleries, such as the Jerome and Dorothy Lemelson Hall of Invention.
- An environmentally controlled chamber to protect the original Star-Spangled Banner flag.

In 2012, the museum began a $37 million renovation of the west wing to add new exhibition spaces, public plazas and an education center. The renovation will also include panoramic windows overlooking the National Mall on all three floors and new interactive features to the exhibits. The first floor of the west wing reopened on July 1, 2015, with the second and third floors of the west wing reopening in 2016 and 2017, respectively.

== Layout ==
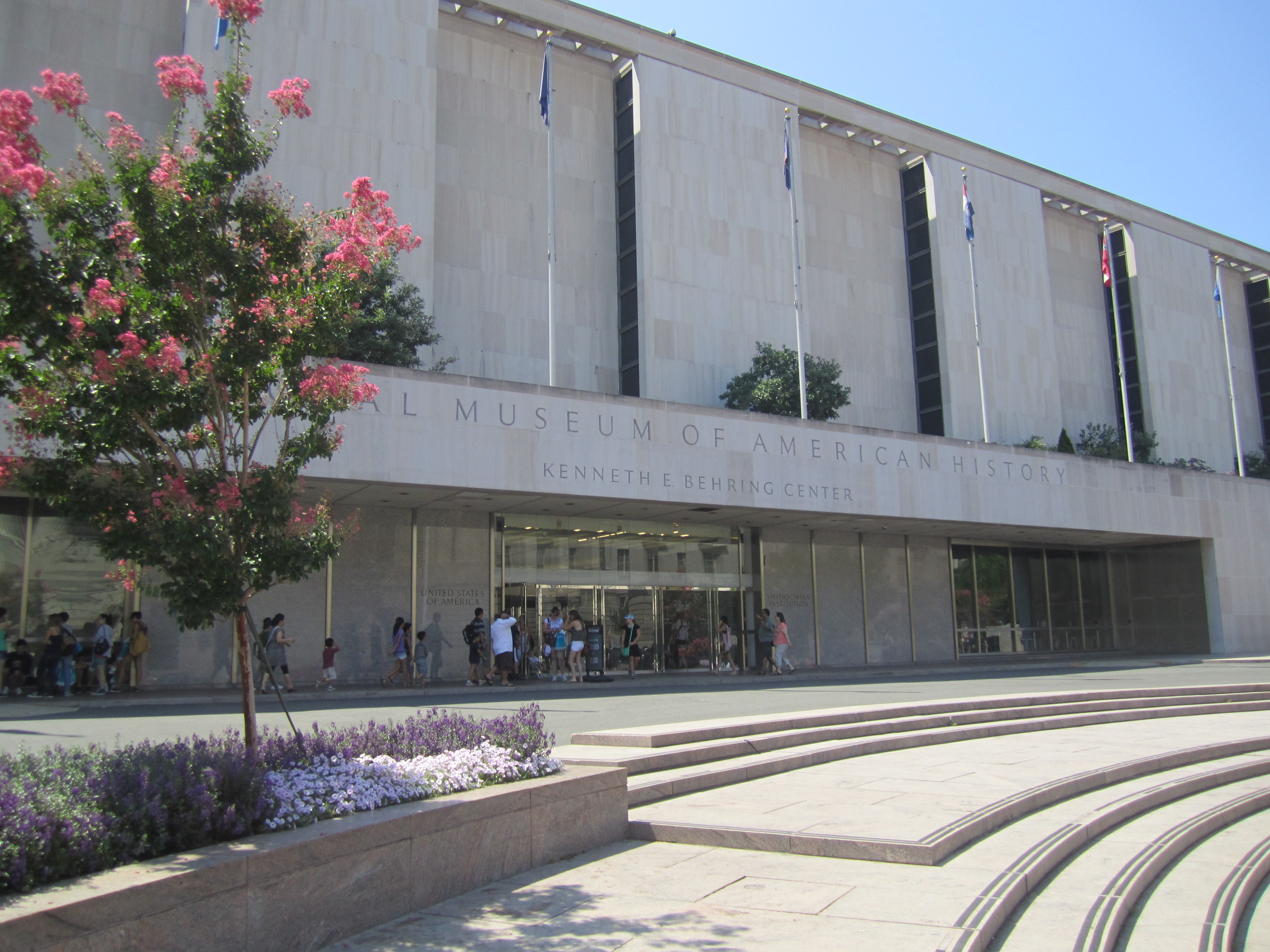
North facade entrance of the museum

Each wing of the museum's three exhibition floors is anchored by a landmark object to highlight the theme of that wing. These include the John Bull locomotive, the Greensboro, North Carolina lunch counter, and a one of a kind draft wheel. Landmarks from pre-existing exhibits include the 1865 Vassar Telescope, a George Washington Statue, a Red Cross ambulance, and a car from Disneyland's Dumbo Flying Elephant ride.

Artifact walls, 275 feet (84 m) of glass-fronted cases, line the first and second floor center core. The artifact walls are organized around themes including arts; popular culture; business, work and economy; home and family; community; land and natural resources; peopling America; politics and reform; science; medicine; technology; and the United States' role in the world.

=== Building ===
==== Lower level ====
The lower level of the museum displays Taking America to Lunch, which celebrates the history of American lunch boxes, many decorated with pop culture. The museum's food court, the Stars and Stripes Café, and ride simulators are also located here.

==== First floor ====
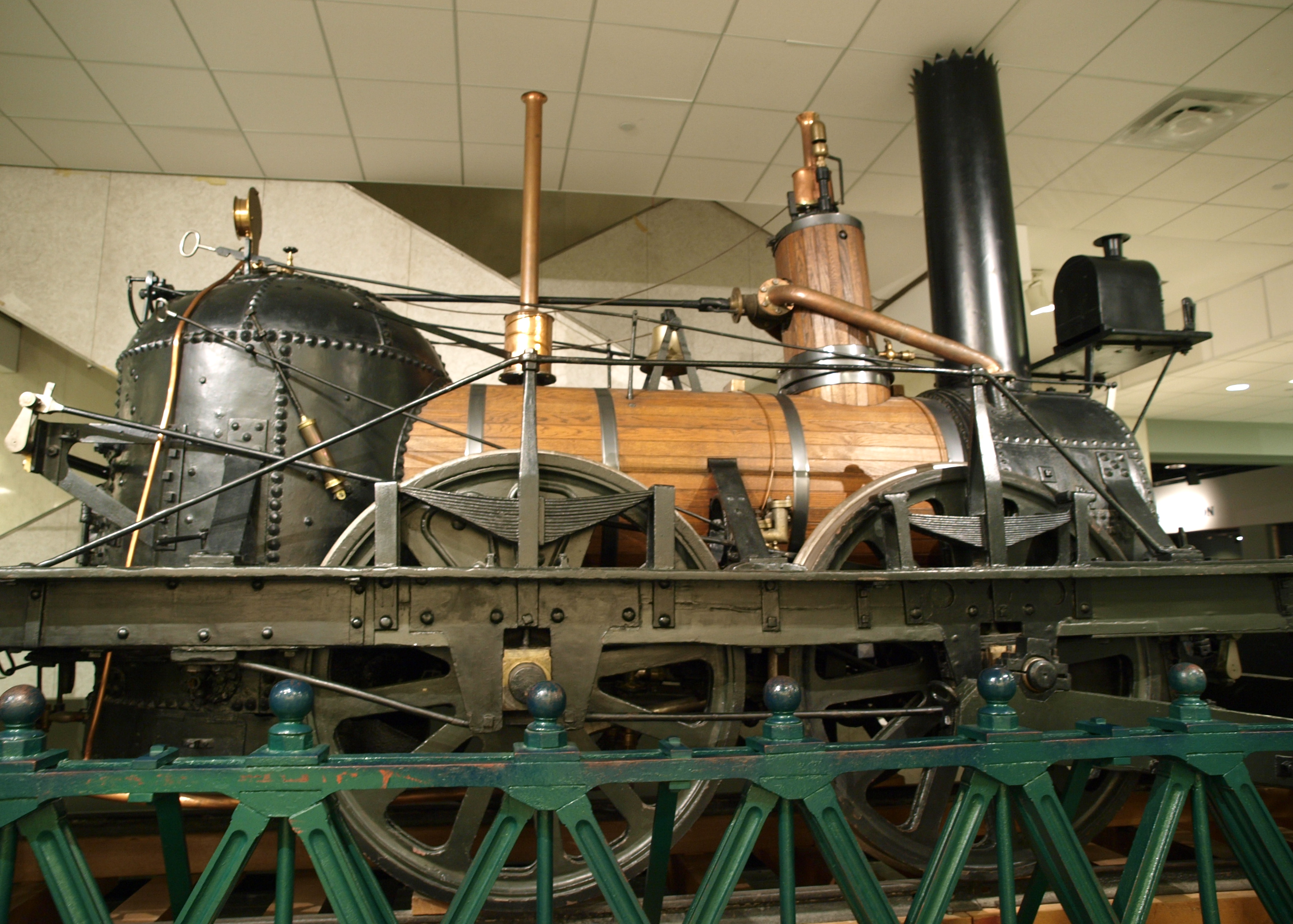
John Bull, an 1831 locomotive displayed in America on the Move, a first-floor exhibit

The first floor's East Wing (called 1 East) has exhibits that feature transportation and technology; they include America on the Move and Lighting a Revolution. The John Bull locomotive is the signature artifact. Exhibits within America on the Move include Southern Railway locomotive no. 1401, Santa Cruz Railroad no. 3, and a Chicago "L" elevated station diorama featuring a CTA 6000-series railcar.

The exhibits in the West Wing (1 West) address science and innovation. They include Science in American Life featuring Robots on the Road and Bon Appétit! Julia Child's Kitchen. Spark!Lab is a hands-on exhibit of the Lemelson Center for the Study of Invention and Innovation. The Vassar Telescope is the signature artifact.

A café and the main museum store are also located on the first floor. The first floor also contains the Constitution Avenue lobby (1 Center), as well as a space for a temporary exhibit.

==== Second floor ====
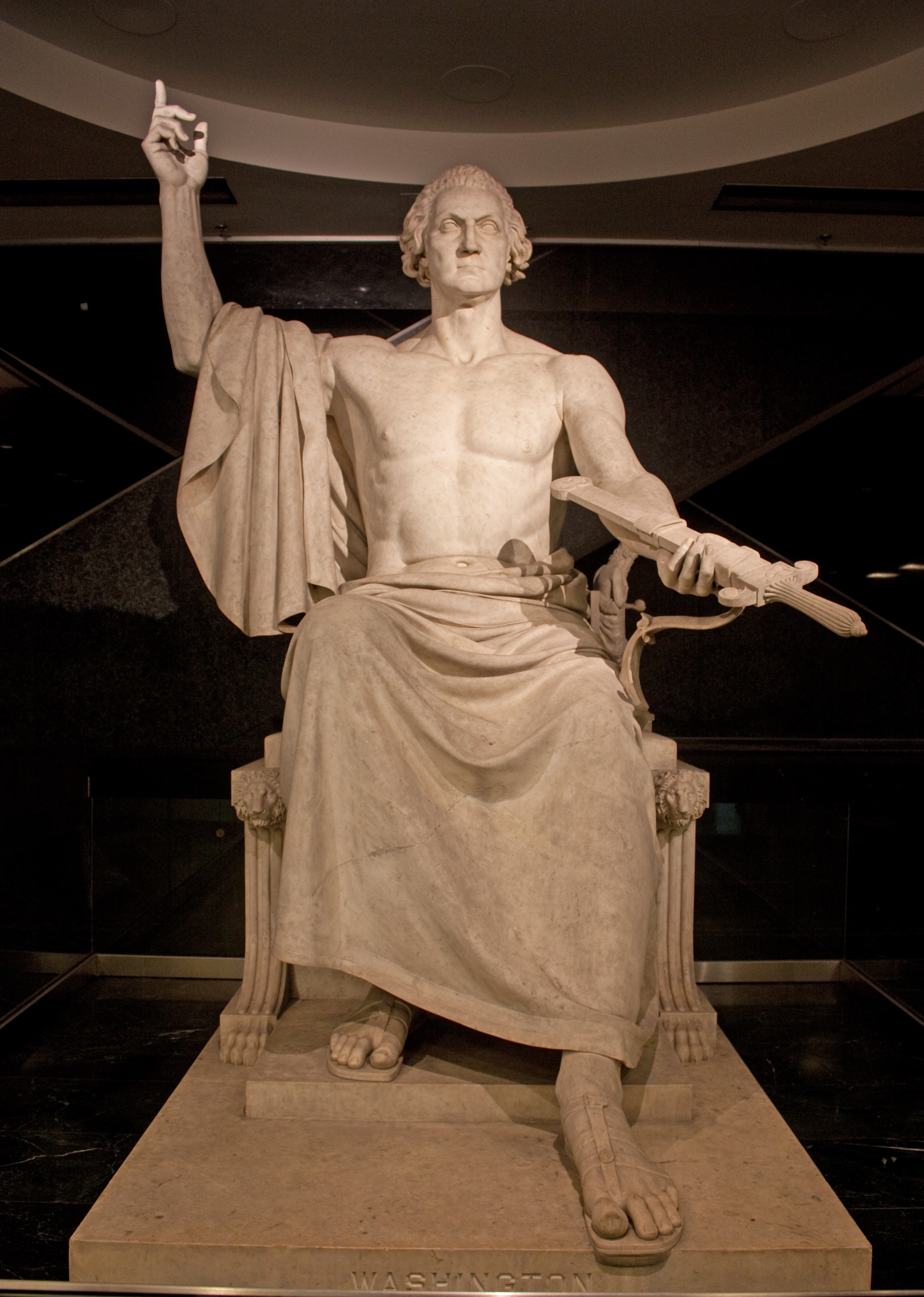
George Washington, 1840, by Horatio Greenough

The exhibitions in 2 East, the east wing of the second floor, consider American ideals and include the Albert Small Documents Gallery featuring rotating exhibits. From November 21, 2008, through January 4, 2009, an original copy of the Gettysburg Address, on loan from the White House, was on display. The Greensboro lunch counter is the signature artifact for this section of the museum.

Located in the center of the second floor (2 Center) is the original Star Spangled Banner Flag which inspired Francis Scott Key's poem. The newly conserved flag, the centerpiece of the renovated museum, is displayed in a climate-controlled room at the heart of the museum. An interactive display by Potion Design, just across the room from the flag, features a full-size, digital reproduction of the flag that allows patrons to learn more about it by touching different areas on the flag.

The George Washington statue, sculpted by Horatio Greenough for exhibit in the Rotunda of the United States Capitol and in celebration of the centennial of Washington's birth, is the signature artifact for 2 West, the west wing of the second floor of the museum.

An entire eighteenth century colonial house, the Choate-Caldwell House (c. 1710/1760) from Ipswich, Massachusetts is located on the second floor (in 2 West) as part of the "Within These Walls" exhibit.

The second floor also houses the museum's new welcome center and a store. The second-floor lobby leads out to Madison Drive and the National Mall.

==== Third floor ====
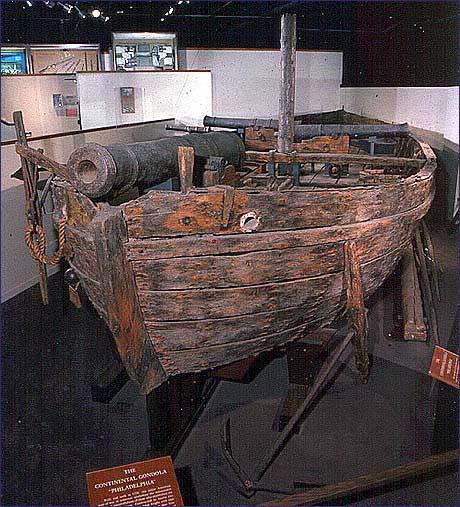
The gunboat Philadelphia

Exhibits in the east wing of the third floor, 3 East, are focused on the military history of the United States; they include The Price of Freedom: Americans at War and the gunboat Philadelphia.

The center of the third floor, 3 Center, presents The American Presidency: A Glorious Burden, which explores the personal and public lives of the men who have held that office. It also features the popular permanent exhibit of First Ladies of America, which features their contributions and changing roles, and displays their dresses as a mark of changing times.

The third-floor west wing, 3 West, has exhibits that feature entertainment, sports, and music. These include Thanks for the Memories: Music, Sports and Entertainment History, the Hall of Musical Instruments, and The Dolls' House. A car from Disneyland's Dumbo the Flying Elephant ride. The most recent exhibit is Entertainment Nation which features objects from Judy Garland, Prince, Selena, Muhammad Ali, Star Wars, Sesame Street, Hamilton, and more.

On the Third floor west, the Gypsy Rose is currently featured in the new exhibit "Corazón y vida: Lowriding Culture" and will remain on display from September 2025 through October 2027. The Gypsy Rose is considered a notable lowrider. The car is featured in the opening credits of the 1970s television show Chico and the Man, as well as in the 1979 film Boulevard Nights. Other lowriders of the time drew inspiration from this car’s unique details, such as its interior candle sconce.

=== Outdoor sculptures ===
In 1967, the 24-foot-tall (7.3 m) abstract sculpture Infinity was dedicated at the National Mall entrance. Designed by José de Rivera and created by Roy Gussow, it was one of the first abstract sculptures displayed at a major public building in Washington D.C. The sculpture is a 16-foot-long (4.9 m), polished stainless steel ribbon on top of a granite tower.

Alexander Calder's sculpture Gwenfritz was installed in a fountain on the west side. The steel abstract stabile was dedicated to the museum on June 2, 1969. In 1984, the museum moved the work to a site closer to Constitution Avenue until July 2013, when conservators removed it for restoration. The sculpture returned to its original site in November 2014, and sits in the midst of a re-created reflecting pool. Calder's original plan for the sculpture envisioned it surrounded by water jets, but architects and engineers of the site determined that the fountain would be challenging to maintain and the water spray would hasten deterioration of the metal.

=== Archives ===
In support of the museum's mission, the Archives Center identifies, acquires, and preserves significant archival records in many media and formats to document America's history and its diverse cultures. Center staff arrange, describe, preserve, and make collections accessible in support of scholarship, exhibitions, publications, and education.

The Archives Center occupies over 12,000 feet (3,700 m) of shelving in the National Museum of American History building. Subject strengths include the history of the radio, television, the telegraph, computing, and other aspects of the history of technology with a special interest in the history of invention; advertising, marketing, and entrepreneurship; commercial visual ephemera (postcards, greeting cards); American music (sheet music, jazz) and musical instruments. These, and a wide range of other subjects, are documented in business records, personal papers, and extensive holdings of motion picture film, video and sound recordings, historical photographs, and oral histories.

=== Jerome and Dorothy Lemelson Center for the Study of Invention and Innovation ===
The Lemelson Center, an initiative of the Lemelson Foundation, produces educational programs, popular and academic publications, exhibitions, podcasts and symposia about invention. The mission of the Lemelson Center is to document, interpret and disseminate information about invention and innovation, encourage creativity in young people, and foster an appreciation for the central role of innovation in the history of the United States. The Center frequently provides a multi-year focus on some aspect of how invention has influenced American society, such as its 2002 "Invention and the Environment" theme. Programs include an annual symposium, presentations and guest speakers, and often the publication of a book highlighting a particular topic.

The Center provides free curricular material to classrooms throughout the United States, organizes traveling museum exhibitions (such as Invention at Play), and provides research opportunities. It obtains archival collections related to invention for the museum's Archives Center. Such collections consist of the papers and materials that document the work of past and current American inventors.

The Archives Center also houses the Division of Cultural History Judaica Collection, described by the Smithsonian as the oldest collection of its type in the United States. Its materials range from the 11th century through the 1980s and include marriage contracts, sukkah decorations, Jewish calendars, certificates of ritual slaughter, prayers, and sermons.

== Directors ==
The following individuals have served as the director of the NMAH. The museum was initially created on July 1, 1957, as the Museum of History and Technology within the United States National Museum; it became the National Museum of History and Technology in 1969 and the National Museum of American History in 1980.

- Frank A. Taylor (April 16, 1958 – 1964)
- John Canfield Ewers (1964–1965)
- Robert P. Multhauf (1966–1968)
- Daniel J. Boorstin (1968–1973)
- Brooke Hindle (1974–1978)
- Claudia Brush Kidwell (1979): acting director
- Roger G. Kennedy (1979–1992)
- Spencer R. Crew (1992–1994): acting director
- Spencer R. Crew (1994–2001)
- Marc J. Pachter (2001–2002): acting director
- Brent D. Glass (October 2002 – August 2014)
- Marc J. Pachter (August 2014 – July 2015): acting director
- John Gray (July 2015 – May 2018)
- Anthea M. Hartig (December 2018 – present)

== Past exhibits ==
- Slavery at Jefferson's Monticello: Paradox of Liberty, January 27 – October 14, 2012, Smithsonian Institution, a landmark exhibit, the first ever on the Mall to explore a president's relation to slavery; it focused on six major slave families at Monticello.
- 24 Hours in Cyberspace – opened on January 23, 1997, this exhibit celebrated "the largest one-day online event" (February 8, 1996) up to that date, which took place on the then-active website, cyber24.com (it is online at a mirror website maintained by Georgia Tech). 24 Hours in Cyberspace was headed by photographer Rick Smolan. The exhibit featured 70 photos from the project.
- Treasures of American History, temporary display at the National Air and Space Museum, closed in April 2008.
- A Nation of Nations was the Smithsonian's Bicentennial salute to the American immigrant experience; it included many iconic rooms and examples of immigrants' contribution to the United States.

== See also ==
- Architecture of Washington, D.C.
- List of artifacts in the National Museum of American History
