= John Gray (museum administrator) =

American businessman and museum administrator

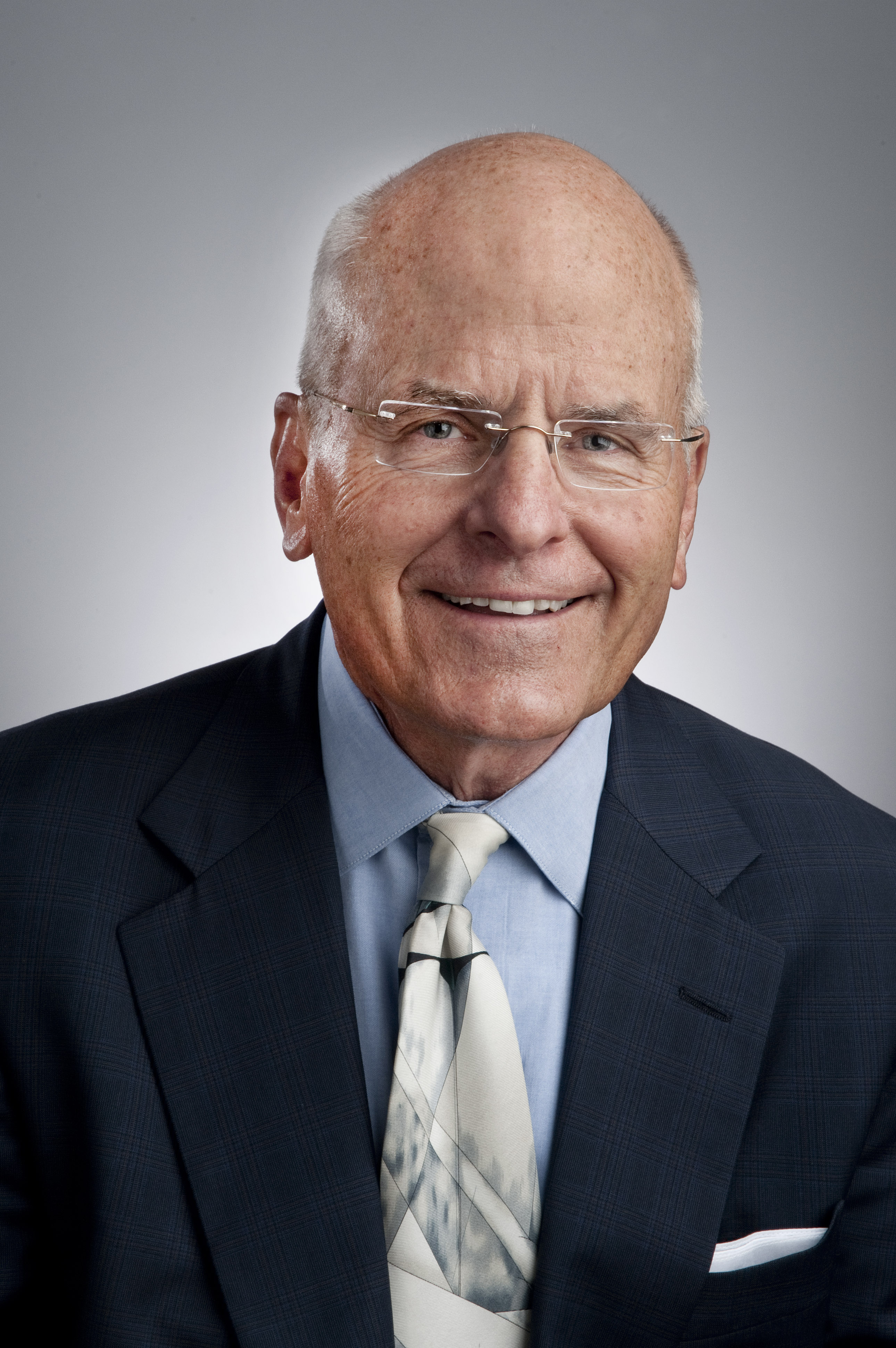
John Gray, 2012

John Gray is an American businessman and museum administrator. He was the director of the National Museum of American History until 2018 and a former president and CEO of the Autry National Center.

== Career ==
Gray worked in commercial banking for 25 years and in the U.S. Small Business Administration.

He became CEO of the Museum of the American West in 1999. During his tenure, the museum merged with the Women of the West Museum and Southwest Museum of the American Indian.

In May 2012, Gray was named the new director of the National Museum of American History at the Smithsonian Institution, replacing retiring director Brent Glass. He retired from the position in 2018 and was succeeded by Anthea Hartig.
