= Infinity (de Rivera) =

1967 sculpture by José de Rivera

- Artist: José de Rivera
- Year: 1967
- Type: sculpture
- Dimensions: 4.1 m × 2.4 m × 4.9 m (13.5 ft × 8 ft × 16 ft)
- Location: National Museum of American History; Washington, D.C.; 38°53′27″N 77°01′48″W
- Owner: Smithsonian Institution

Infinity is an abstract sculpture designed and created by José de Rivera with assistance from Roy Gussow. It is located at the south entrance of the National Museum of American History, at Madison Drive and 12th Street, Northwest, Washington, D.C.

It was dedicated on March 28, 1967. It cost $104,520. It slowly rotates on its base.

Rivera created a similar sister sculpture that was installed at Rochester Institute of Technology one year later.

== See also ==
- List of public art in Washington, D.C., Ward 2
