= George Washington (Greenough) =

Statue of George Washington by Horatio Greenough

Coordinates: 38°53′28″N 77°01′50″W

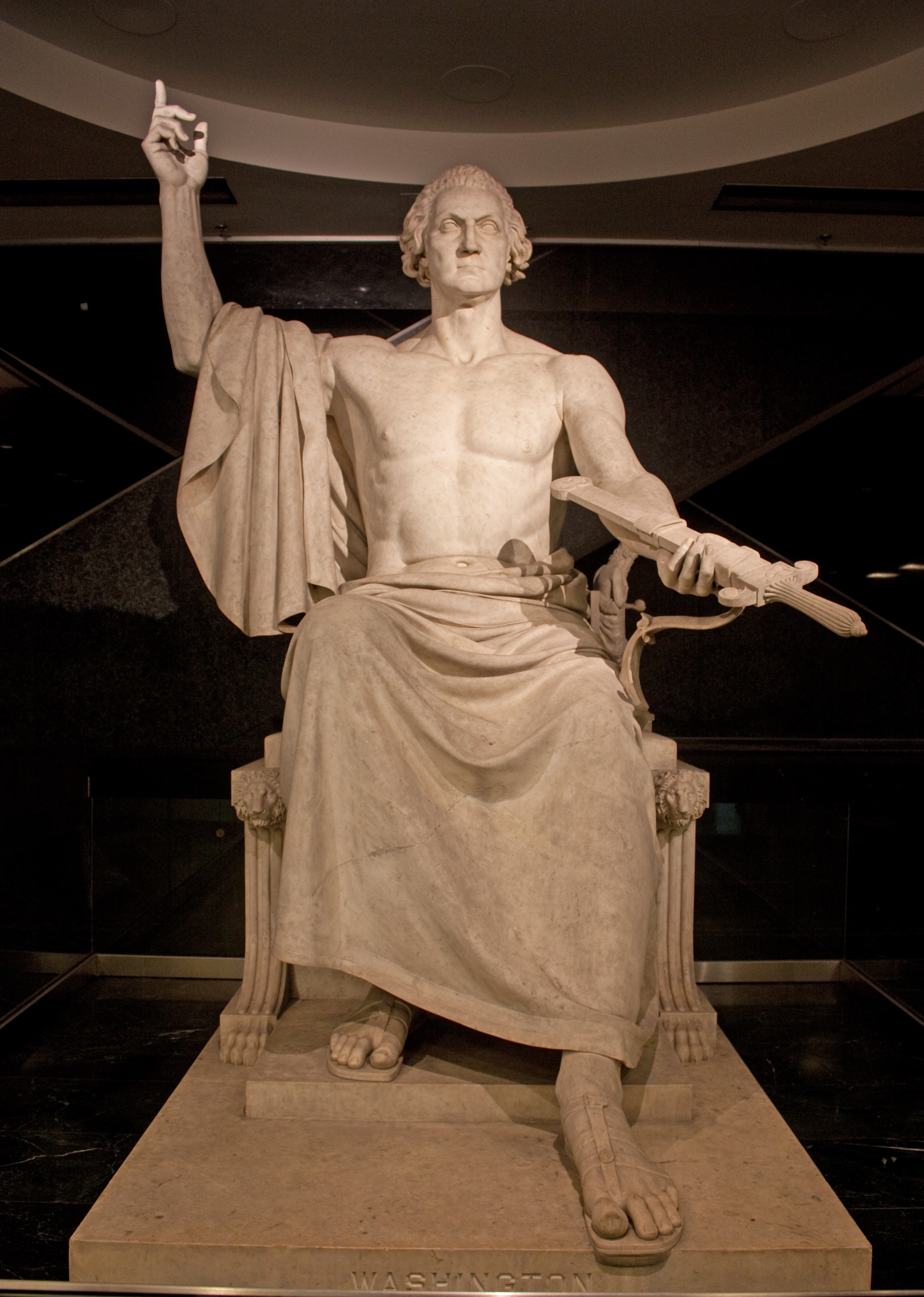
- Artist: Horatio Greenough
- Year: 1840
- Type: Carrara marble
- Dimensions: 3.5 m × 2.6 m (136 in × 102 in × 82 1/2 in)
- Location: National Museum of American History, Washington, D.C., United States
- Owner: Smithsonian Institution

George Washington, also known as Enthroned Washington, is a large marble sculpture by Horatio Greenough commissioned by the United States Congress on July 14, 1832 for the centennial of U.S. President George Washington's birth on February 22, 1732. Completed in 1840, the statue was soon exhibited in the Rotunda of the United States Capitol and then moved to the Capitol's east lawn in 1843. Since 1964, it has been in the National Museum of American History.

Horatio Greenough based Enthroned Washington on Phidias' Statue of Zeus at Olympia, one of the Seven Wonders of the Ancient World which was destroyed in Late Antiquity.

== Description ==
The seated and sandal wearing Washington gazes sternly ahead. He is bare-chested and his right arm and hand gesture with upraised index finger toward Heaven. His left palm and forearm cradle a sheathed sword, hilt forward, symbolizing Washington turning over power to the people at the conclusion of the American Revolutionary War. The representation of Washington in Roman clothing is indicative of Neoclassical art.

The original Latin inscription, on the back of the statue reads:

SIMULACRUM ISTUD
AD MAGNUM LIBERTATIS EXEMPLUM
NEC SINE IPSA DURATURUM
HORATIUS GREENOUGH
FACIEBAT

and translates as: "Horatio Greenough made this image as a great example of freedom, which will not survive without freedom itself."

== History ==
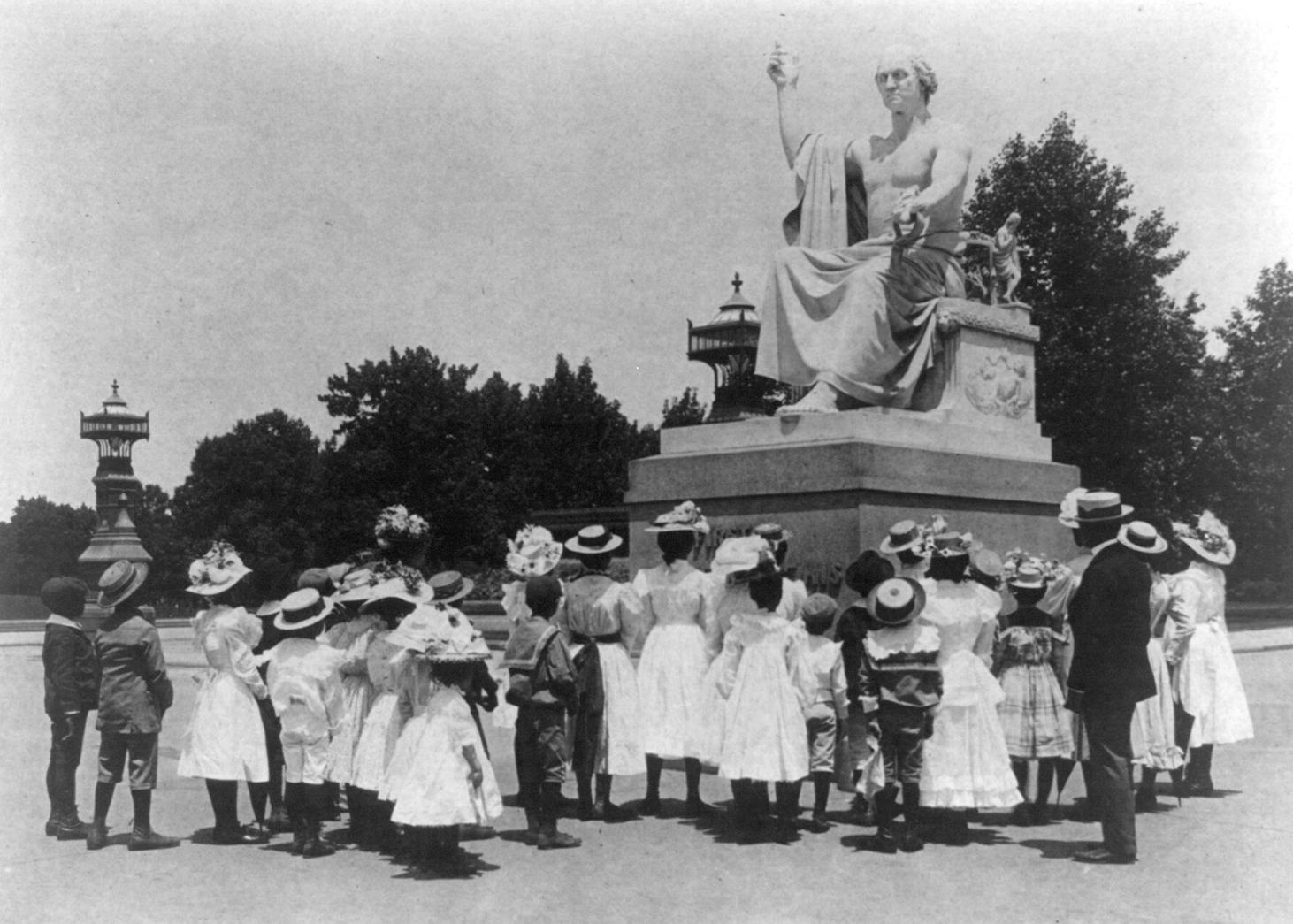
George Washington (photo, c. 1899)

On July 14, 1832, the U.S. Congress commissioned Greenough to create a statue of Washington for display in the U.S. Capitol rotunda. When the marble statue arrived in Washington, D.C. from Italy on July 31, 1841 it immediately generated controversy and criticism on its installation in the rotunda in December 1841. Many found the sight of a half-naked Washington offensive, even comical.

Because of the sculpture's weight and the dim light inside the rotunda, the statue was relocated to a pedestal on the east lawn of the Capitol in 1843. Disapproval continued and some joked that Washington was desperately reaching for his clothes, then on exhibit at the Patent Office several blocks to the north.

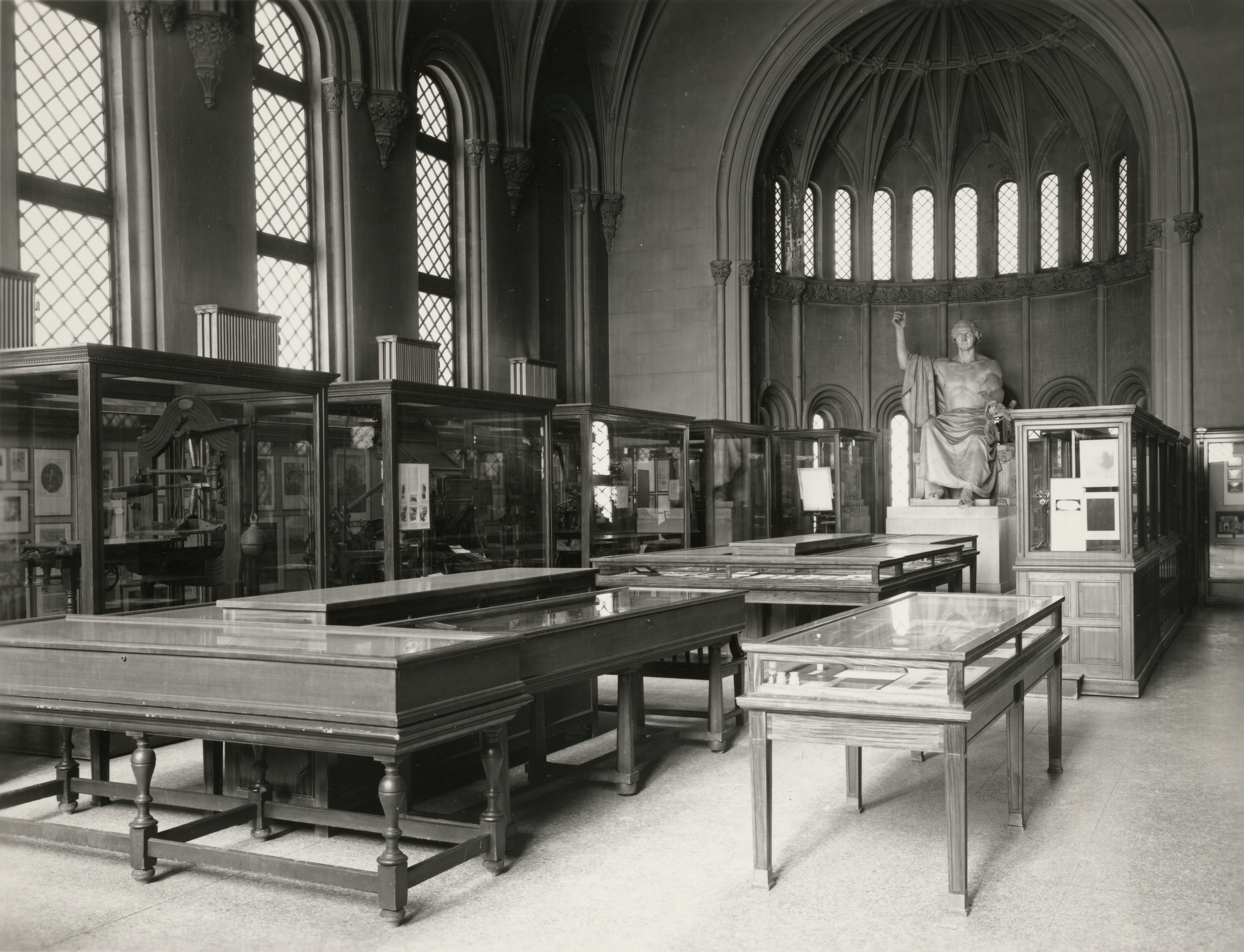
The statue on display in the west wing of the Smithsonian Castle, c. 1920s or 1930s

The statue was brought back indoors to the Smithsonian Castle, after Congress authorized its transfer by joint resolution on May 22, 1908. It remained there until 1964. It was then moved to the new Museum of History and Technology (now the National Museum of American History). The statue has been exhibited on the second floor of the museum since then.

== Popular culture references ==
The demigod/Baphomet-like pose of Washington is portrayed in Dan Brown's best-selling novel The Lost Symbol (2009), in which the author describes a hypothesis according to which Washington and the other Founding Fathers decorated the national capital full of Freemason or occult symbols.

The statue appears near the beginning of the 2013 first-person shooter, BioShock Infinite, set in an alternate 1912 where Washington, Benjamin Franklin, and Thomas Jefferson are worshiped by the inhabitants of the floating city of Columbia.

== See also ==
- Cultural depictions of George Washington
- List of monuments dedicated to George Washington
- List of statues of George Washington
- List of sculptures of presidents of the United States
- The Apotheosis of Washington
- George Washington, statue by Antonio Canova
- George Washington's resignation as commander-in-chief
