= Women of the West Museum =

History museum in Colorado

Women of the West Museum was a history museum focused on the history of women of all cultures in the American West. It was located in Boulder, Colorado beginning in 1991. In 2002, the museum merged with the Autry Museum of the American West in Los Angeles.
