= Henry Fitz =

American engineer and telescope manufacturer

Henry Fitz Jr.
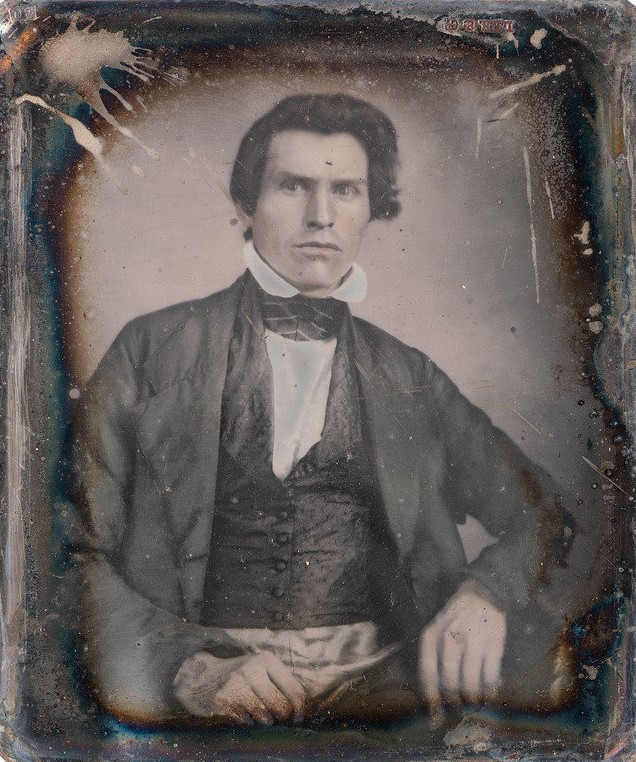
- Fitz, circa 1840-42 daguerreotype
- Born: 31 December 1808; Newburyport, Massachusetts, USA
- Died: 7 November 1863 (aged 54)
- Resting place: New York City, USA
- Occupation: businessman
- Known for: manufacturer of telescopes, early photography
- Spouse: Julia Ann Wells (m. 1844)

Henry Fitz Jr. (December 31, 1808 – November 7, 1863) was an American engineer, scientist, locksmith, optician, inventor and a pioneer of photography in the United States.

== Personal life ==
Fitz was born in Newburyport, Massachusetts on December 31, 1808. He married Julia Ann Wells of Southold, Long Island in June 1844.

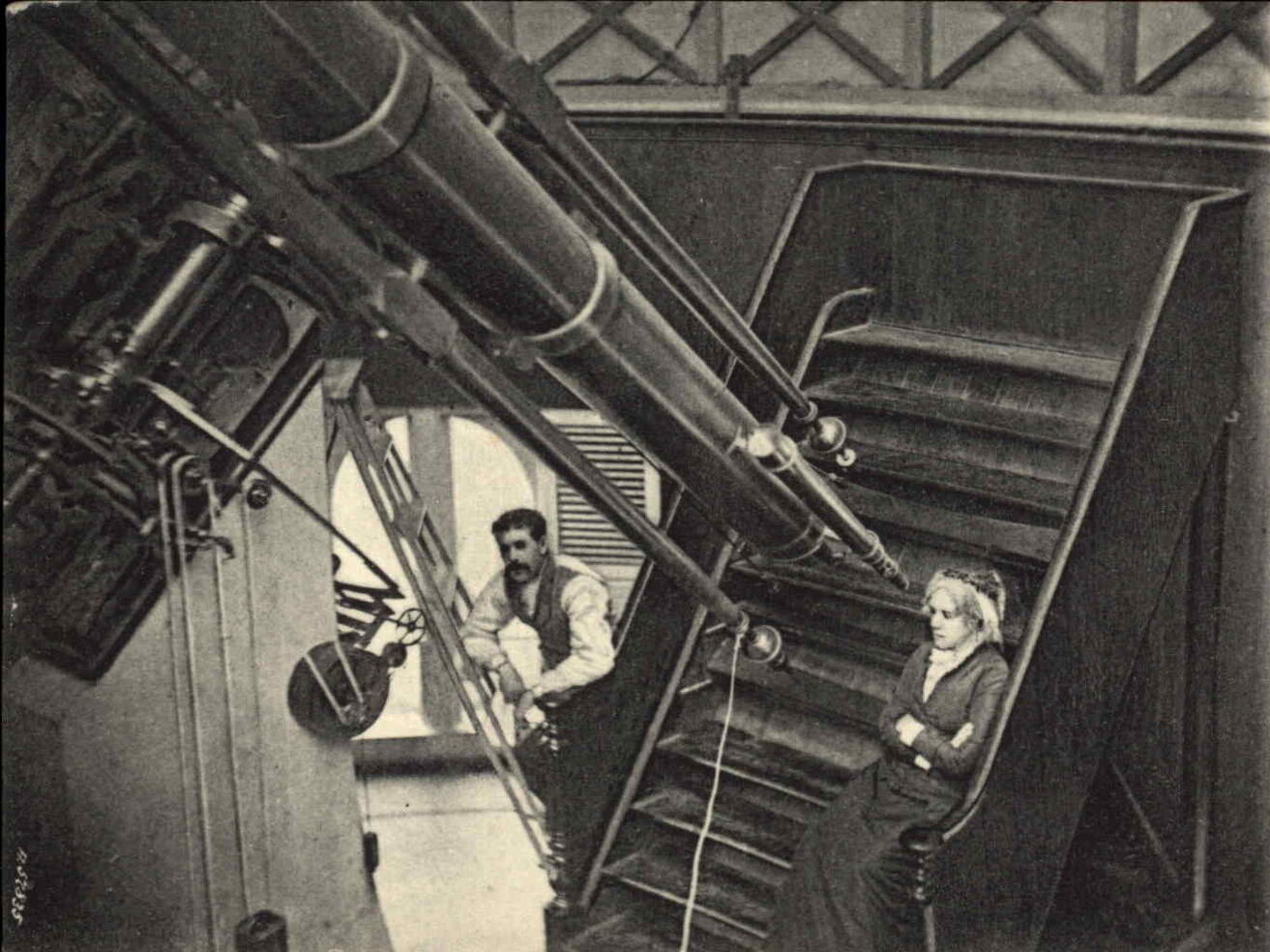
Maria Mitchell in Vassar College Observatory June 1878 using a telescope made by Fitz

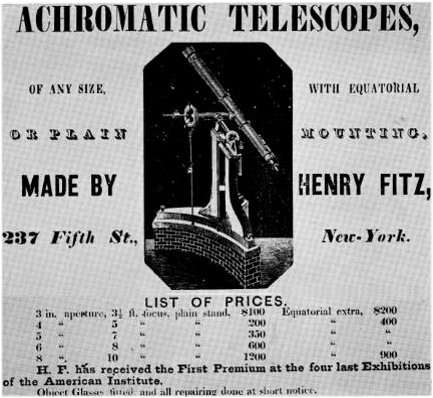
Henry Fitz 1850 shop advertisement

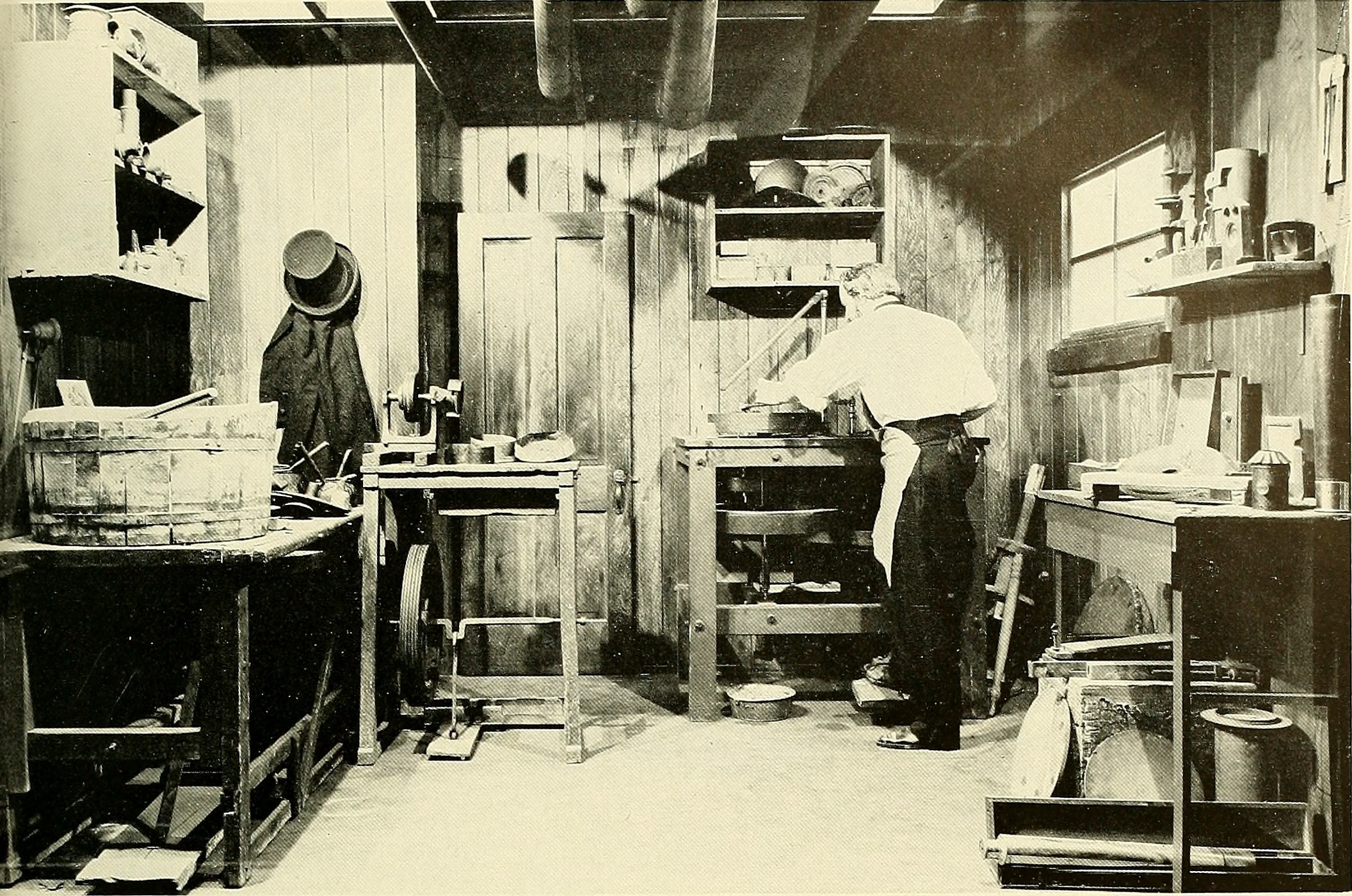
Henry Fitz's workshop reconstructed at Smithsonian Institution at their Museum of American History

== Career and death ==
After returning from a trip in Europe in December 1839, he entered partnership with Alexander Wolcott and John Johnson to solve the problem of making daguerreotype portraits. Johnson fell ill, however, and work only resumed in January 1840. These experiments led Wolcott to patent a special mirror camera.

Wolcott and Johnson opened the first photo studio in the world in March 1840. Fitz opened his own daguerreotype studio in Baltimore in June 1840. A group of daguerreotypes, from the early experimentation with Wolcott and Johnson as well as later studio portraits, were discovered and sold at auction in 2021.

Fitz’s telescope business was highly profitable, so in 1863, he started construction of a new house. However, he died suddenly on November 7, 1863. Obituaries report that his demise was from tuberculosis. Before his final illness, he was about to sail for Europe to select a glass for a 24-inch (610 mm) telescope and to procure patents for a camera involving a new form of lens.

== Sources ==
- English, Neil (2013). Classic telescopes : a guide to collecting, restoring, and using telescopes of yesteryear. New York, NY: Springer. ISBN 978-1-4614-4424-4. OCLC 809794115.
- Lankford, John (1997). History of astronomy : an encyclopedia. New York: Garland Pub. ISBN 0-8153-0322-X. OCLC 35042300.
- Smithsonian Institution (1877). Bulletin. United States Printing Office. OCLC 761267914.
- Smithsonian Institution (2019). Smithsonian American women : remarkable objects and stories of strength, ingenuity, and vision from the National Collection. Jill Lepore, Michelle Anne Delaney, Victoria Pope, Christine Schrum, Nancy Bercaw, Lisa Kathleen Graddy. Washington, DC: United States Printing Office. ISBN 978-1-58834-665-0. OCLC 1084632898.
- United States National Museum (1962). Development of the Electrical Technology in Nineteenth Century. Smithsonian Institution. OCLC 988840144.
