= Naomi Wadler =

American activist (born 2006)

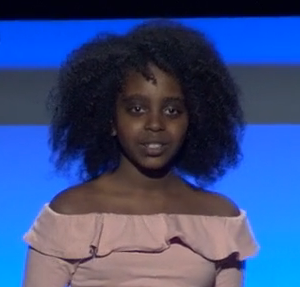
- Wadler in 2018
- Born: October 16, 2006 (age 19); Ethiopia
- Education: The Field School
- Years active: 2018–present

Naomi Wadler (born October 16, 2006) is an American student and activist against gun violence. She has made speeches advocating for victims of gun violence in the United States, especially Black female victims, most notably at the pro-gun control protest March For Our Lives. She attends Alexandria City High School in Alexandria, Virginia.

== Personal life ==
Wadler was adopted by Julie Wadler from an Ethiopian orphanage in 2007. Wadler's mother also adopted another daughter, Sarah, in 2009.

Wadler's African American father is a recreational hunter.

Wadler told Elle in April 2018 that she is Ethiopian Jewish and that she had been the victim of racism at her school because of her Jewish and Ethiopian heritages.

== Political activism ==
On March 14, 2018, Wadler helped organize a walkout of 200 classmates at George Mason Elementary School. They stood in silence for 18 minutes: 17 minutes in memory of the 17 victims of the Stoneman Douglas High School shooting and one additional minute in memory of Courtlin Arrington, a Black girl who had been a victim of gun violence at Huffman High School in Birmingham, Alabama.

On March 24, 2018, Wadler spoke to many people at March for Our Lives in Washington, D.C. She was the youngest speaker at the rally. She talked about why she pushed for the walkout and said that there's a disproportionate number of Black female victims of gun violence in the United States. Instead of holding the protest for 17 minutes like the people at the other schools, Wadler held the protest to last for 18 minutes. The extra minute was for Courtlin Arrington, a girl who was shot at her school in Alabama on March 7. Wadler was initially worried that discussing Black female victims would be considered "off topic", but felt comfortable after finding out about "other students from all over would speak from their experiences". The speech became popular on Twitter, and was praised by famous Black actresses.

Wadler subsequently spoke at the Women in the World Annual Summit and the Teen Vogue summit. She received a standing ovation for her speech at the Tribeca Film Festival, where she received the Disruptive Innovation Award. Wadler mentioned a Black woman who was killed in the Nashville Waffle House shooting on April 22, 2018, along with three Black men. Wadler asserted that the perpetrator had been offered a bail, which was revoked after additional criminal charges, because he was white. Wadler was also a guest at The Ellen DeGeneres Show. She spoke at the 2020 Davos Economic Forum highlighting racial disparities in addressing gun violence against Black females in the United States saying: "White girls’ lives matter so much more than any black girl who dies in the inner city, or on the way to school. We don’t hear about them, they’re statistics." She was named one of Teen Vogue's "21 Under 21" and shared a New York Magazine cover with actress Barbra Streisand.

== See also ==
- Gun politics in the United States
