= Choate-Caldwell House =

18th-century house in Ipswich, Massachusetts, US

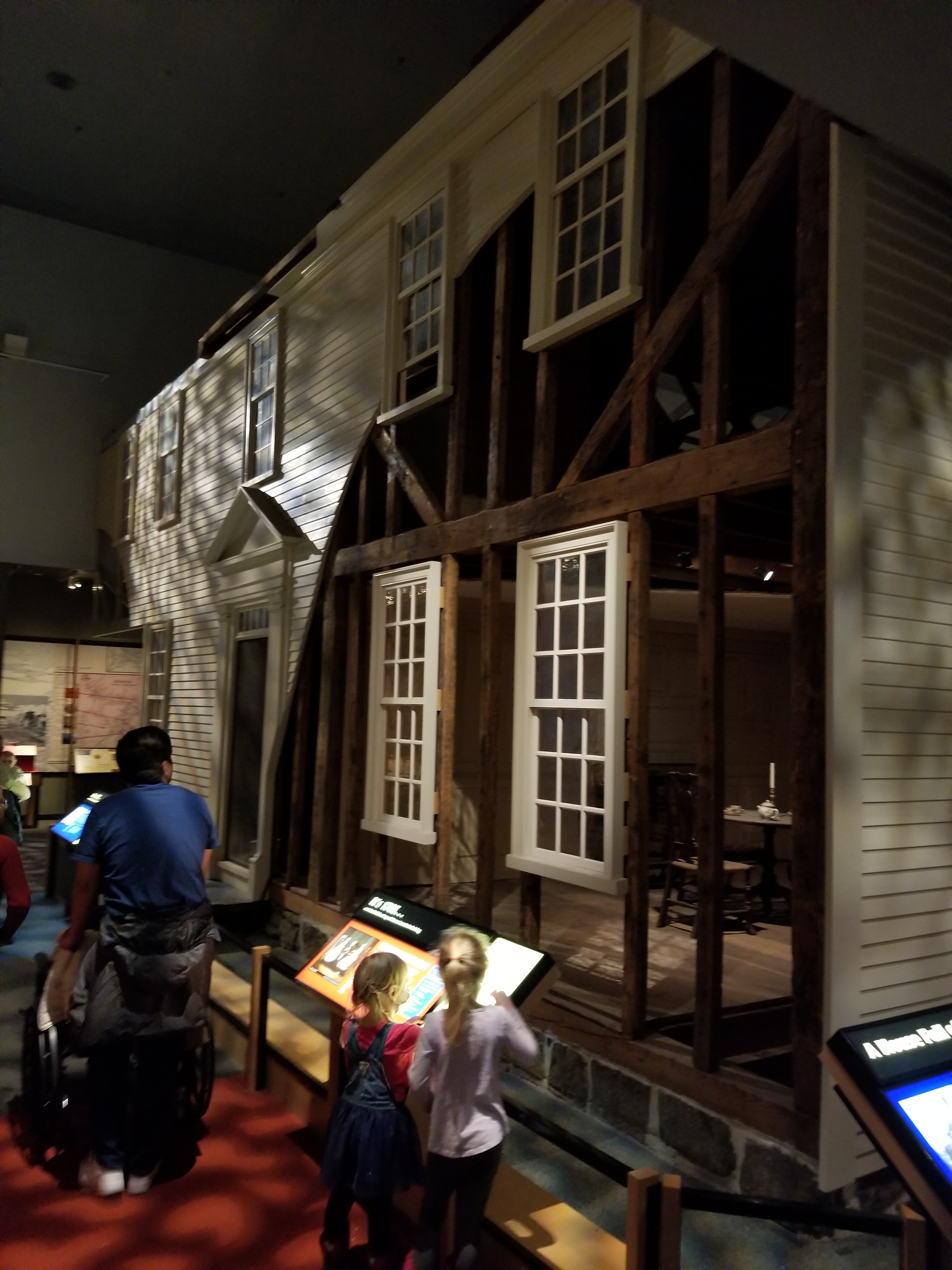
Choate-Caldwell House on display as part of the "Within These Walls" exhibit at the National Museum of American History

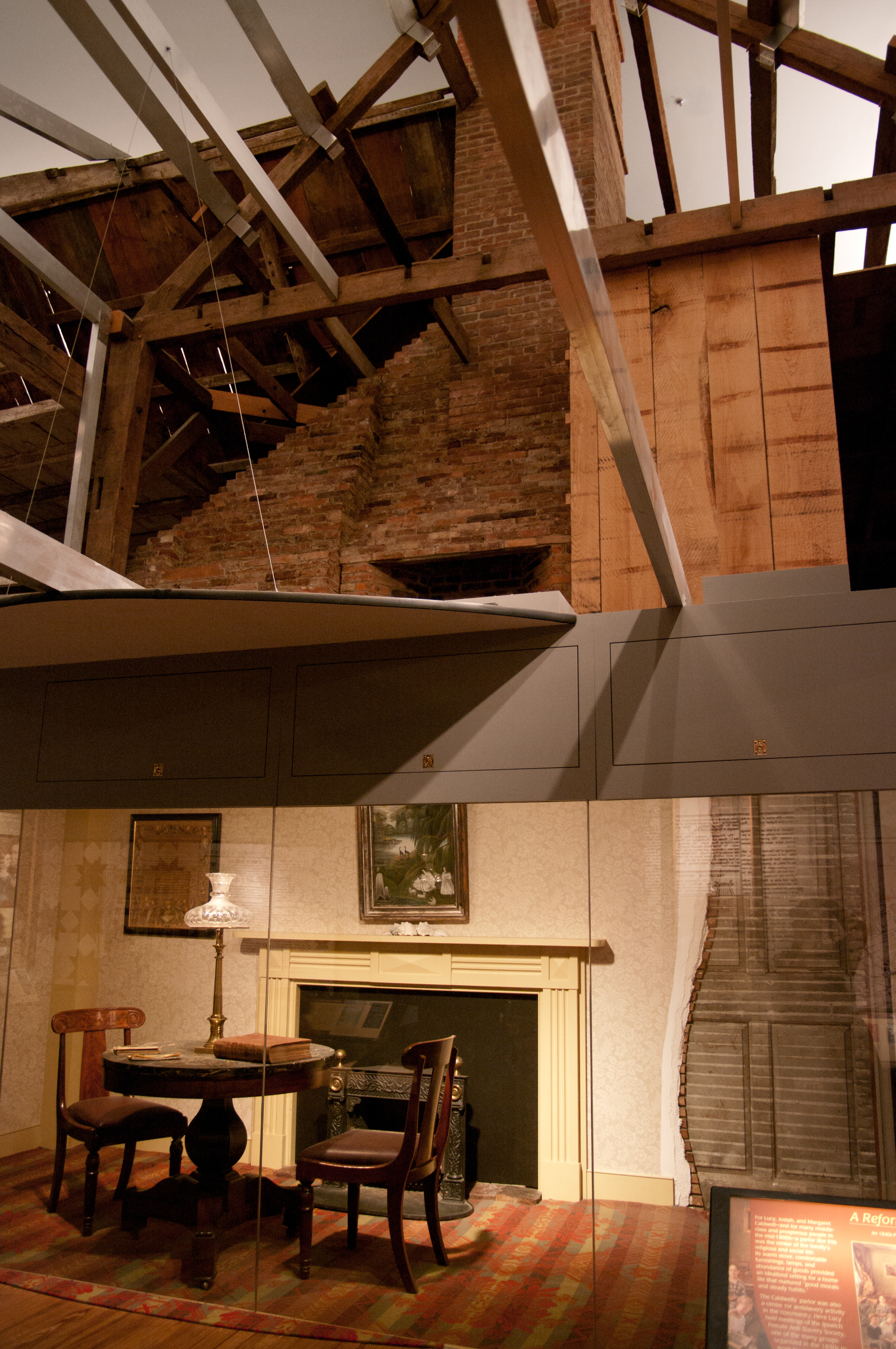
Choate-Caldwell House on display as part of the "Within These Walls" exhibit at the National Museum of American History

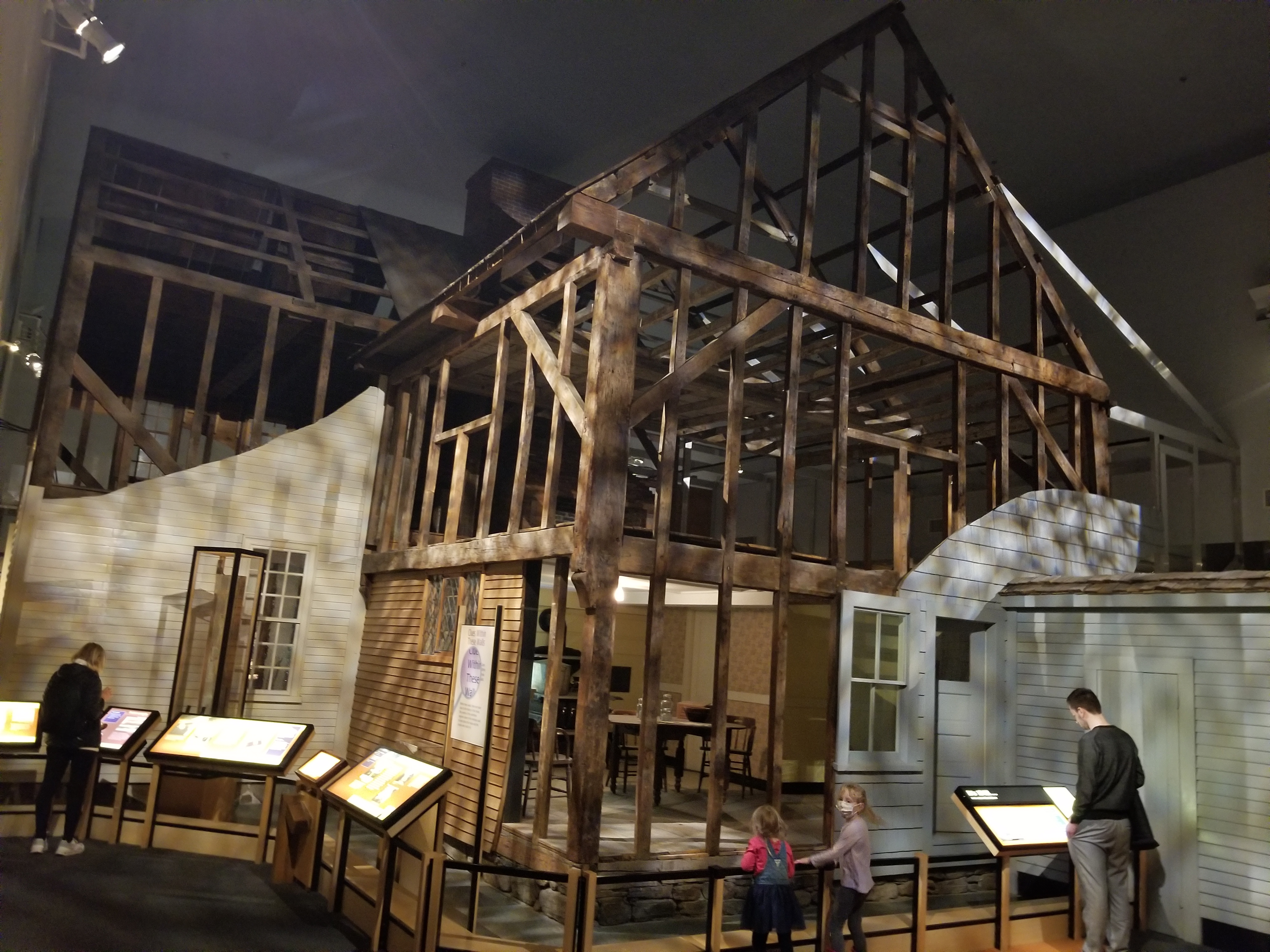
Circa 1710 back portion of Choate-Caldwell House showing timber framing

Choate-Caldwell House (also known as the Within These Walls exhibit) is a historic eighteenth-century New England colonial house (c. 1710/1760) that was originally located at 16 Elm Street in Ipswich, Massachusetts. In 1963 the house was donated and moved to the Smithsonian Institution in Washington, D.C., where it is currently on permanent display at the National Museum of American History. It is the largest single artifact in the museum's collections.

== History in Ipswich ==
Abraham Choate, a farmer and merchant, constructed the timber-framed house in about 1768 and attached part of an older house (circa 1710) to the back of the home to provide additional space for his large family. A Revolutionary War Patriot veteran Abraham Dodge acquired the house in 1777 and lived there with his household including Chance Bradstreet, an African American enslaved man. In 1822 abolitionists Josiah and Lucy Caldwell acquired the house and held anti-slavery meetings there. In 1865 the Heard family purchased the house and created apartments within the house for mill workers including Irish immigrants such as Mary and Catherine Lynch. From at least 1942 until 1961 the home was occupied by the Scott family, who were active supporters of the American effort during World War II, and then the house remained vacant and was scheduled to be demolished in 1963.

== Donation and move to the Smithsonian ==
The house was saved on the day of demolition when the Smithsonian agreed to accept the house as a donation after being contacted by local preservationists Kay Thompson and Helen Lunt. The house was largely reassembled in 2001 and is now located on the second floor (in 2 West) as part of the "Within These Walls" exhibit, where parts of the interior and exterior framing, chimney brickwork, and other construction details can be observed.

== See also ==
- List of the oldest buildings in Massachusetts
