= José de Rivera =

American abstract sculptor (1904–1985)

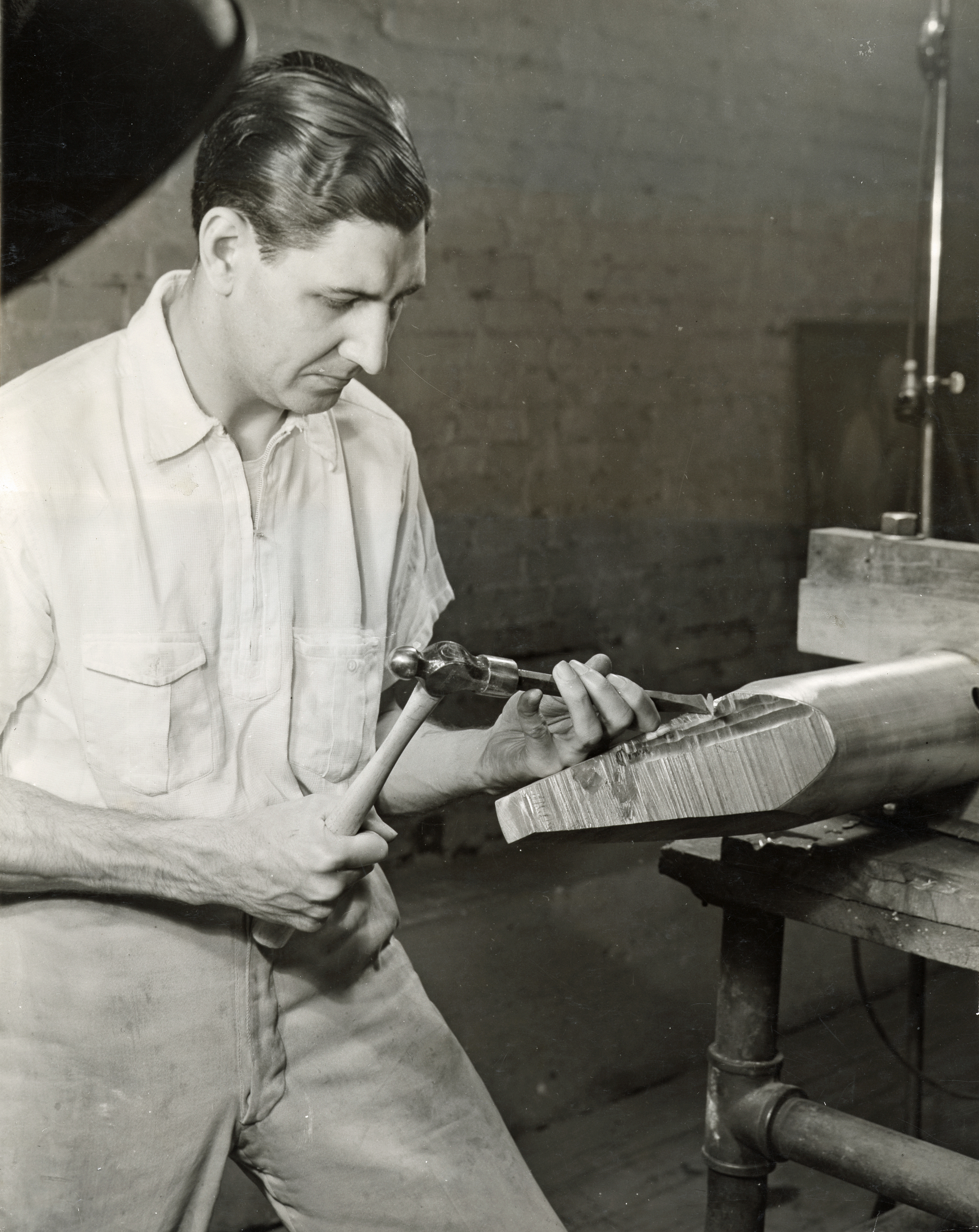
- De Rivera in 1937
- Born: José Ruiz de Rivera; September 18, 1904; Baton Rouge, Louisiana, US
- Died: March 12, 1985 (aged 80); New York City, US
- Occupation: Sculptor
- Notable work: Infinity (1967); Black, yellow, red (1942)

José Ruiz de Rivera (September 18, 1904 – March 12, 1985) was an American abstract sculptor.

== Life and career ==
José Ruiz de Rivera was born in Baton Rouge, Louisiana and grew up in New Orleans. He dropped out of high school, but finished at a boarding school. He worked on a plantation fixing farm machinery. In 1924, he moved to Chicago. He studied drawing with muralist John W. Norton and worked for the Federal Arts Project of the Works Progress Administration.

In 1932, he moved to Manhattan. He also worked as a model maker for Sikorsky Aircraft. He served in the United States Army Air Corps in World War II, and at the Training Aids Development Center.

In 1946, he had his first one-man show at the Mortimer Levitt Gallery, New York City.

In 1947–52, de Rivera's Black, yellow, red (1942) was exhibited in the 25-venue Painting toward architecture exhibition organized by the Miller Company Collection of Abstract Art. The artwork received a lot of media attention during the exhibition and was the artwork spotlighted (via the one photo accompanying the article) in The New York Times article about the first venue of the exhibition at the Wadsworth Atheneum in Hartford, CT. A photo of the artwork was also used to accompany an article about the exhibition in Newsweek. Black, yellow, red was also featured in Henry-Russell Hitchcock's accompanying book Painting toward architecture (1948), with foreword by Alfred Barr of the Museum of Modern Art, New York. The artwork was also the basis for the cover of a Miller Company heater design catalogue, thematically called "A spiralating heat wave".

In 1960, he created Construction #72, which was acquired by the University of New Mexico in 1966 and displayed in the foyer of the UNM Fine Arts Center. The sculpture is a curved stainless-steel tube that rotates slowly on a motorized base. Construction #72 was loaned to the Los Angeles County Museum of Art, and afterward to the Philadelphia Museum of Art for the "Sculpture of the 60's" exhibition, before returning to the University of New Mexico.

His sculptures were commissioned for the American Pavilion at the 1958 World's Fair and in 1964 for the New York World's Fair in Flushing Meadow, Queens. In 1967 he completed a sculpture that stands on a granite trylon in front of the Smithsonian Institution National Museum of History and Technology in Washington D.C.

In 2002–03, the Valerie Carberry Gallery in Chicago exhibited Jose de Rivera: Abstract Sculpture, Painting and Works on Paper.

On March 12, 1984, at the age of 80, de Rivera died at Lenox Hill Hospital, New York City, five weeks after suffering a stroke.

== Works ==
- Black, Yellow, Red, (1942). National Gallery of Art, 1977.75.8
- American Pavilion at the Expo 58
- Construction #46, Chazen Museum of Art
- Form, 1964 World's Fair
- Infinity, 1967, National Museum of American History
- Construction #105, 1968, Rochester Institute of Technology
- Construction #35, 1956, Hirshhorn Museum and Sculpture Garden, 66.1277
- Construction #72, 1960, University of New Mexico Art Museum, 66.134
- Construction #76, 1961, Hirshhorn, 66.1279
- Construction #107, 1969, Hirshhorn, 72.91
- Construction, Red and Black, 1954, Hirshhorn, 66.1278
- Construction in Yellow, Black, Red and White, c. 1949–1952, Hirshhorn, 86.1412
- Homage to the World of Minkowski, 1954–1955, Metropolitan Museum of Art, 55.204ab
- Construction #158, 1974–1975, Metropolitan Museum of Art, 1985.432ab
- A Wishing Star, 1956, Dallas Statler Hilton

== Sources ==
- Pachner, Joan (2002). José de Rivera : sculpture, paintings, works on paper : 1 November 2002-3 January 2003. Chicago, IL: Valerie Carberry Gallery. ISBN 9780972483704. OCLC 53228605.
- Ashton, Dore; Marter, Joan M. (1980). José De Rivera, constructions. Madrid: Taller Ediciones. ISBN 9788473300858.
