= Joseph Cummings Chase =

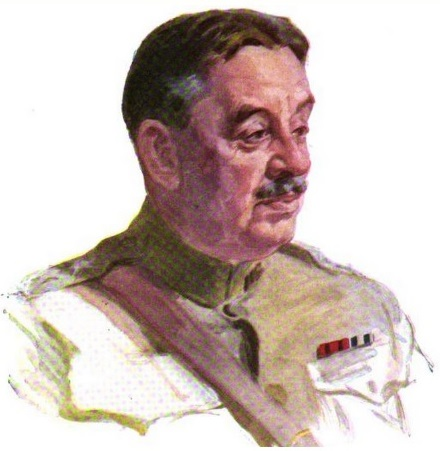
Portrait of Army general Adelbert Cronkhite

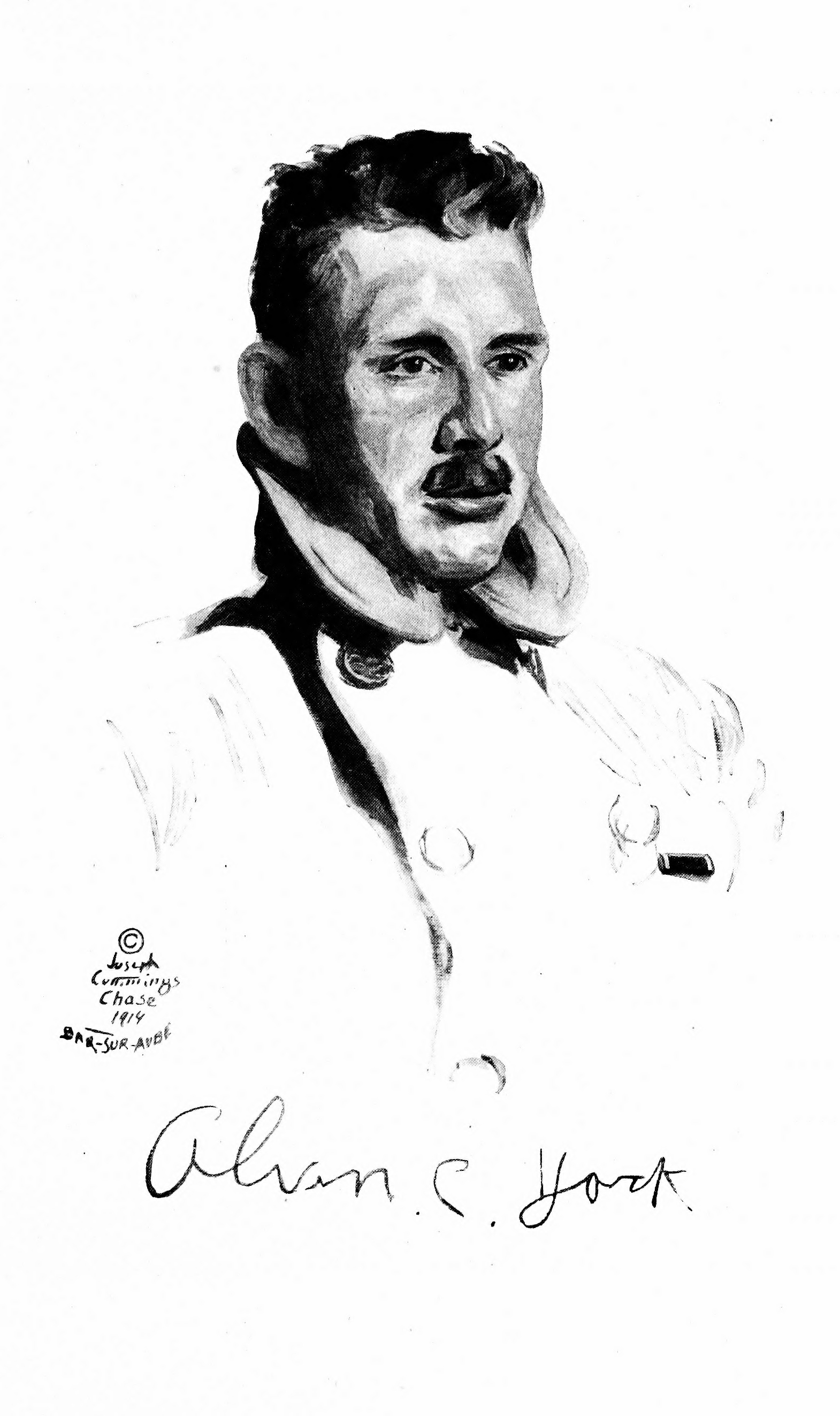
Portrait of American war hero Alvin York

Joseph Cummings Chase (May 5, 1878 – January 15, 1965) was an American artist who made portraits during World War I, World War II, and the Korean War. He also painted leading figures from non-military society. The National Portrait Gallery at the Smithsonian has more than 100 of his works.

Chase was born in Kents Hill, Maine. He and his family had close involvement with Kents Hill School.

Chase studied at the Pratt Institute and the Pennsylvania Academy of the Fine Arts.

He illustrated several novels and wrote about making art. He also served as dean of Hunter College's art department in New York City during the 1930s.

He died in Milwaukee, Wisconsin where he had been living for about a decade.
