= Curing of tobacco =

Preparation for smoking or chewing

Tobacco is cured to dry and age it in preparation for human consumption. The color of the leaf changes with aging, also known as color curing. Tobacco is cured directly after it is harvested in nearly all instances where it is to be used for smoking or chewing.

== History ==
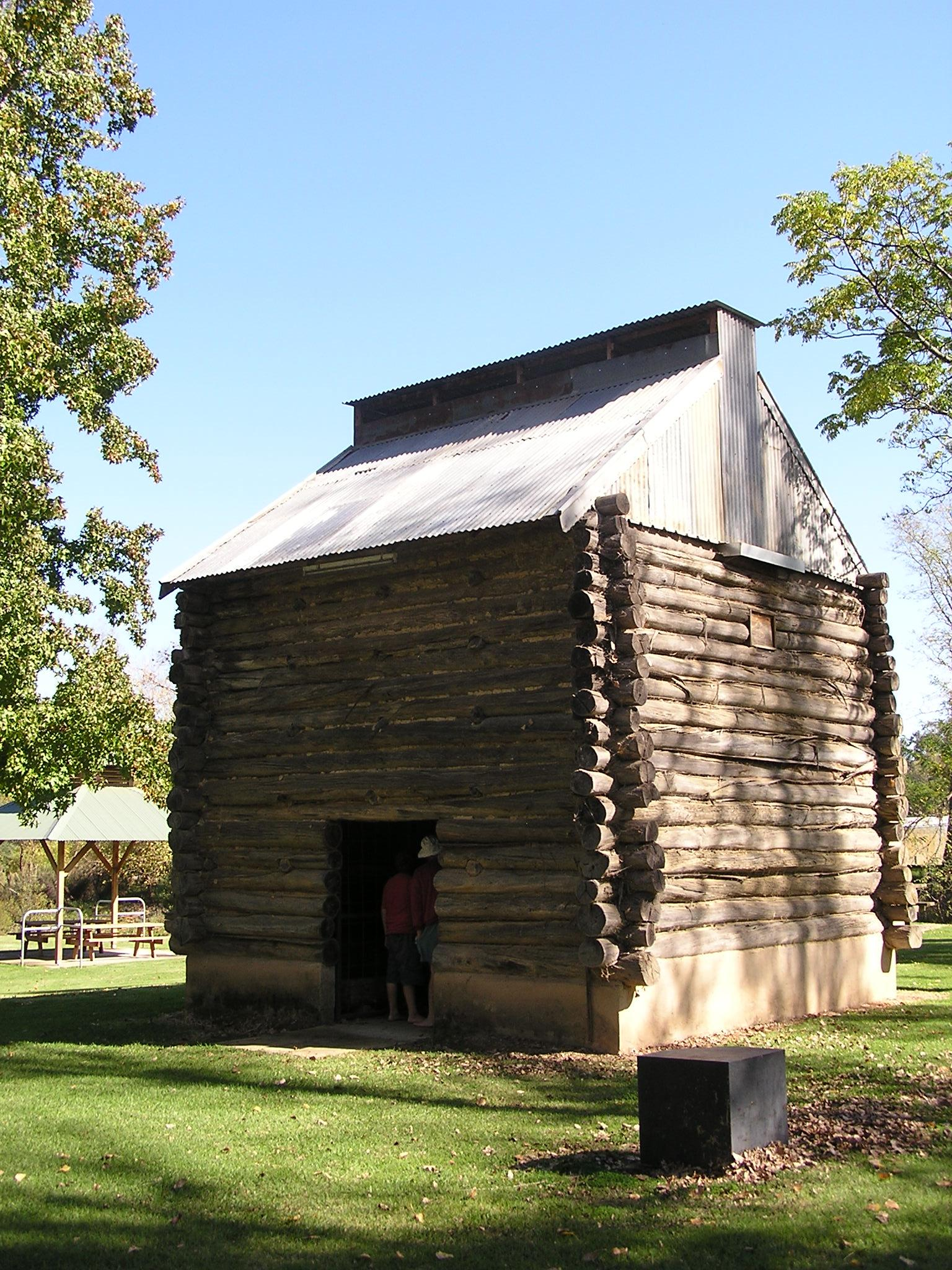
Historic tobacco drying barn (or "kiln") in Myrtleford, Victoria, Australia

Curing tobacco is necessary to prepare the leaf for consumption because in its raw freshly picked state the green tobacco leaf is too wet to ignite and be smoked, and too acrid to chew. In recent times, traditional curing barns in the United States have been replaced with prefabricated metal curing boxes. Temporary curing boxes are often found at tobacco farms.

== Processes ==
Curing and subsequent aging allow for the slow oxidation and degradation of carotenoids in the tobacco leaf. This produces various compounds in the tobacco leaves that give cured tobacco its sweet aroma, characteristic flavor, and degree of "smoothness" to the consumed product. Non-aged or low quality tobacco is often artificially flavored with these otherwise naturally occurring compounds. Tobacco flavoring is a significant source of revenue for the flavor and fragrance industry.

Aging continues for a period of months, and often extends into the post-curing process.

After tobacco is cured, it is moved from the curing barn into a storage area for processing. If whole plants were cut, the leaves are removed from the tobacco stalks in a process called stripping. For both cut and pulled tobacco, the leaves are then sorted into different grades. In colonial times, the tobacco was then "prized" into hogsheads for transportation. In brightleaf tobacco regions, prizing was replaced by stacking wrapped "hands" into loose piles to be sold at auction. Today, most cured tobacco is baled before sales are made under pre-sold contracts.

== Methods ==
Cut plants or pulled leaves are immediately transferred to tobacco barns (kiln houses), where they will be cured. Curing methods vary with the type of tobacco grown, and tobacco barn design varies accordingly, including the newer use of field-side curing frames.

=== Air ===
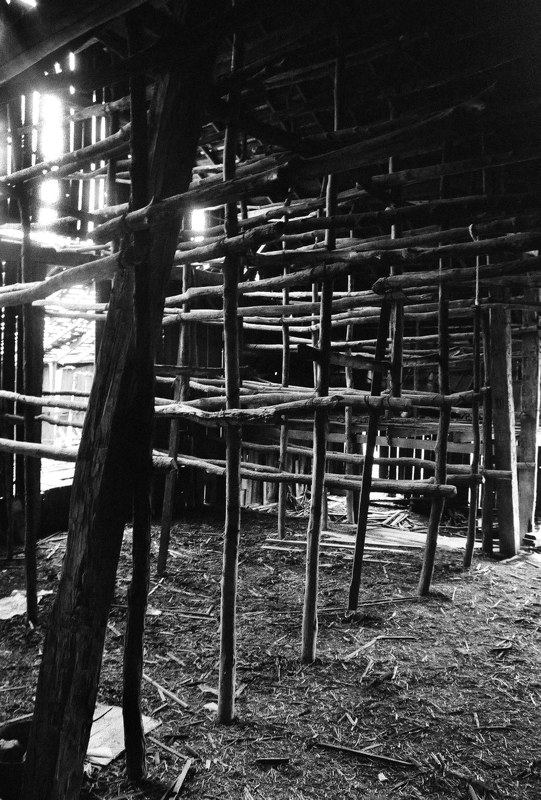
Historic barn for air-curing of tobacco, West Virginia, United States.

Air-cured tobacco is hung in well-ventilated barns and allowed to dry over a period of four to eight weeks. Air-cured tobacco is low in sugar, which gives the tobacco smoke a light, sweet flavor, and a high nicotine content. Cigar and burley tobaccos are air cured.

=== Fire ===
Fire-cured tobacco is hung in large barns where fires of hardwoods are kept on continuous or intermittent low smoulder and takes between three days and ten weeks, depending on the process and the tobacco. Fire curing produces a tobacco low in sugar and high in nicotine. Pipe tobacco, chewing tobacco, and snuff are fire cured.

=== Flue ===
Flue-cured tobacco was originally strung onto tobacco sticks, which were hung from tier-poles in curing barns (Aus: kilns), also traditionally called oasts. These barns have flues which run from externally fed fire boxes, heat-curing the tobacco without exposing it to smoke, slowly raising the temperature over the course of the curing. In the 1960s conversion to gas fueled systems such as the Gas tobacco Burner System was common. The process will generally take about a week. This method produces tobacco that is high in sugar and has medium to high levels of nicotine. The Smith Tobacco Barn is an example of a traditional, flue-cured tobacco barn. Flue-cured tobacco requires an estimated one tree per 300 cigarettes.

=== Sun ===
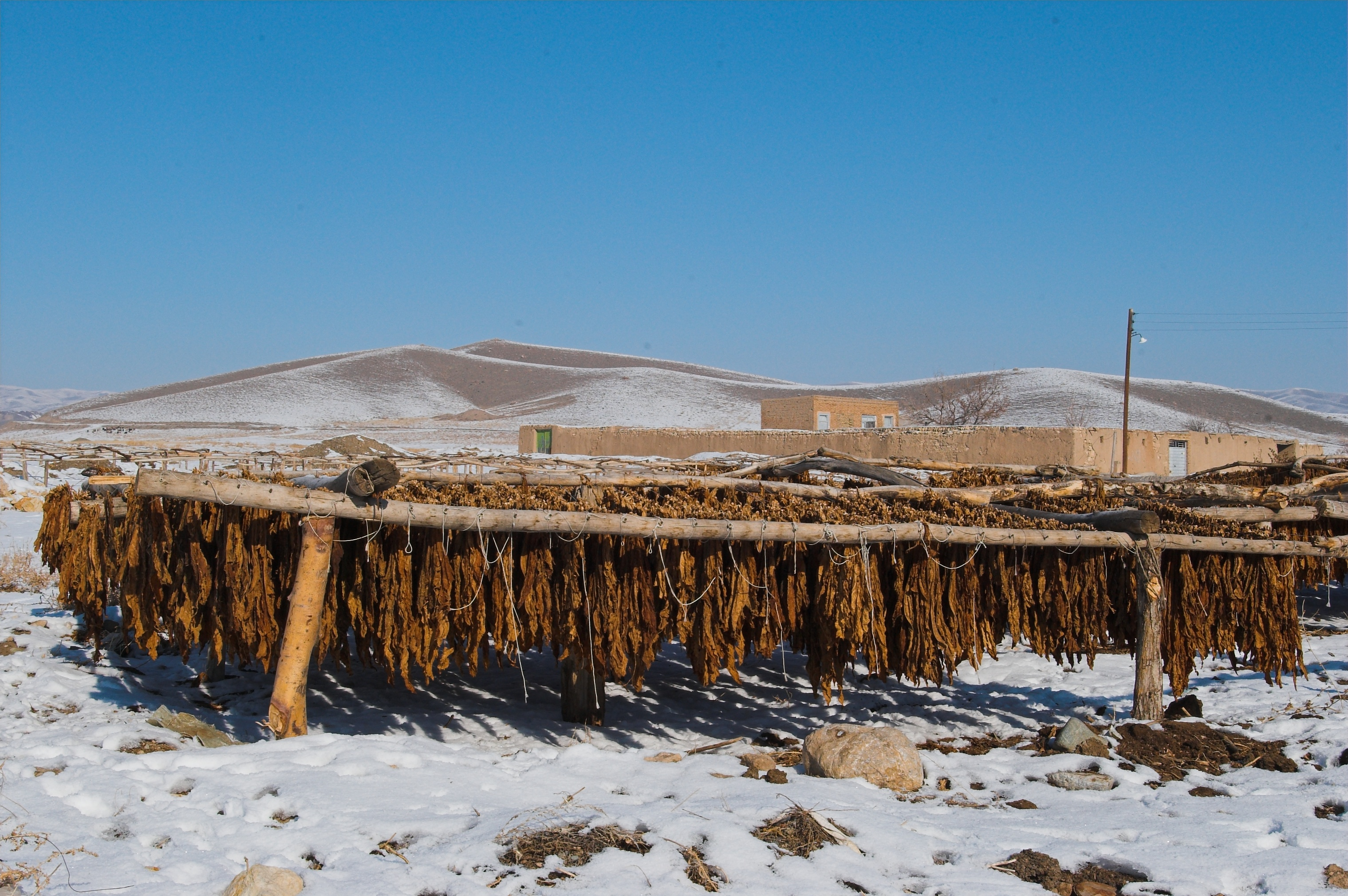
Sun-cured tobacco, Bastam, Iran.

Sun-curing tobacco involves simply drying the leaves uncovered in the sun until they are brown and withered. This method is predominantly used in Turkey, Greece, Bulgaria, North Macedonia, Romania and throughout the Mediterranean basin to produce oriental tobacco, however sun-cured tobacco is also produced in India and Africa as well. Oriental sun-cured tobacco is low in both sugar and nicotine but fragrant, herbal, and spicy. It is prized among pipe tobacco blenders for this quality. In India, sun-curing is used to produce so-called "white" snuff from varieties of burley. The sun-cured burley tobacco is very finely milled into a dry powder, and unusually potent.

=== Fermentation ===
Some tobaccos such as Cavendish and Perique are subjected to a second stage of curing known as fermenting or sweating. Cavendish tobacco undergoes a process of fermentation under great pressure (often in a large press) and steam. Before being steamed, it is "cased" in a solution which mainly consists of sugar, but can sometimes include flavorings. Perique is special in its process of fermentation, as after it is air-cured, it is traditionally fermented under enormous pressure (via large weights or a hydraulic press) for several months to a year. The process produces a very strong tobacco in both flavor and nicotine, and is prized by pipe tobacco blenders for its uniquely peppery and savory flavors and aromas.

== See also ==
- Types of tobacco
