= Tobacco =

Agricultural product processed from the leaves of plants in the genus Nicotiana

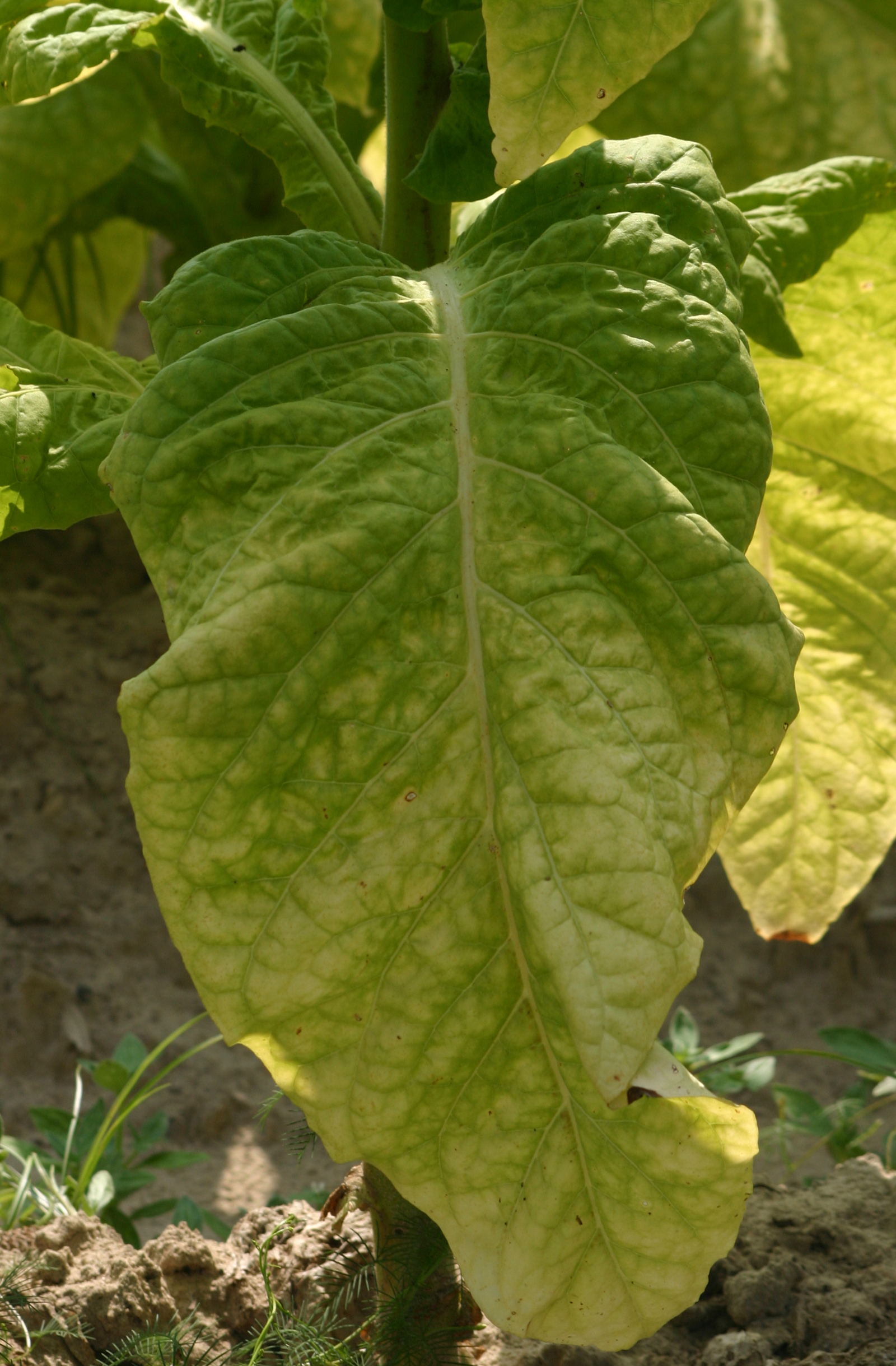
- A ripening tobacco leaf, harvested and cured before use
- Source plant(s): Nicotiana
- Part(s) of plant: Leaf
- Geographic origin: The Americas
- Active ingredients: Nicotine, harmine
- Uses: Recreational, Medical, Religious, Traditional
- Legal status: AU: Unscheduled; CA: Unscheduled; DE: Unscheduled; UK: General sales list (GSL, OTC); US: Unscheduled; UN: Unscheduled; In general, legal and regulated as a controlled substance for adult recreational use in most countries; tobacco smuggling or homemade tobacco making or growing is illegal in some areas. Bhutan is the only country to ban the sale of tobacco products outright. See tobacco control Footnote: Carcinogenicity: IARC group 1

Share of adults who smoke

Tobacco is the common name of several plants in the genus Nicotiana of the family Solanaceae, and the general term for any product prepared from the cured leaves of these plants. Seventy-nine species of tobacco are known, but the chief commercial crop is N. tabacum. The more potent variant N. rustica is also used in some countries.

Dried tobacco leaves are mainly used for smoking in cigarettes and cigars, as well as pipes and shishas. They can also be consumed as snuff, chewing tobacco, dipping tobacco, and snus.

Tobacco contains the highly addictive stimulant alkaloid nicotine as well as harmala alkaloids. Due to the widespread availability and legality of tobacco, nicotine is one of the most widely used recreational drugs. Tobacco use is a cause or risk factor for many deadly diseases, especially those affecting the heart, liver, and lungs, as well as many cancers. In 2008, the World Health Organization named tobacco use as the world's single greatest preventable cause of death.

== Etymology ==
The English word tobacco originates from the Spanish word tabaco. The precise origin of this word is disputed, but it is generally thought to have derived, at least in part, from Taíno, the Arawakan language of the Caribbean. In Taíno, it was said to mean either a roll of tobacco leaves (according to Bartolomé de las Casas, 1552), or to tabago, a kind of Y-shaped pipe used for sniffing tobacco smoke (according to Oviedo, with the leaves themselves being referred to as cohiba). Another version suggests that the term tobacco comes from the indigenous people of Tabasco, Mexico, who smoked it.

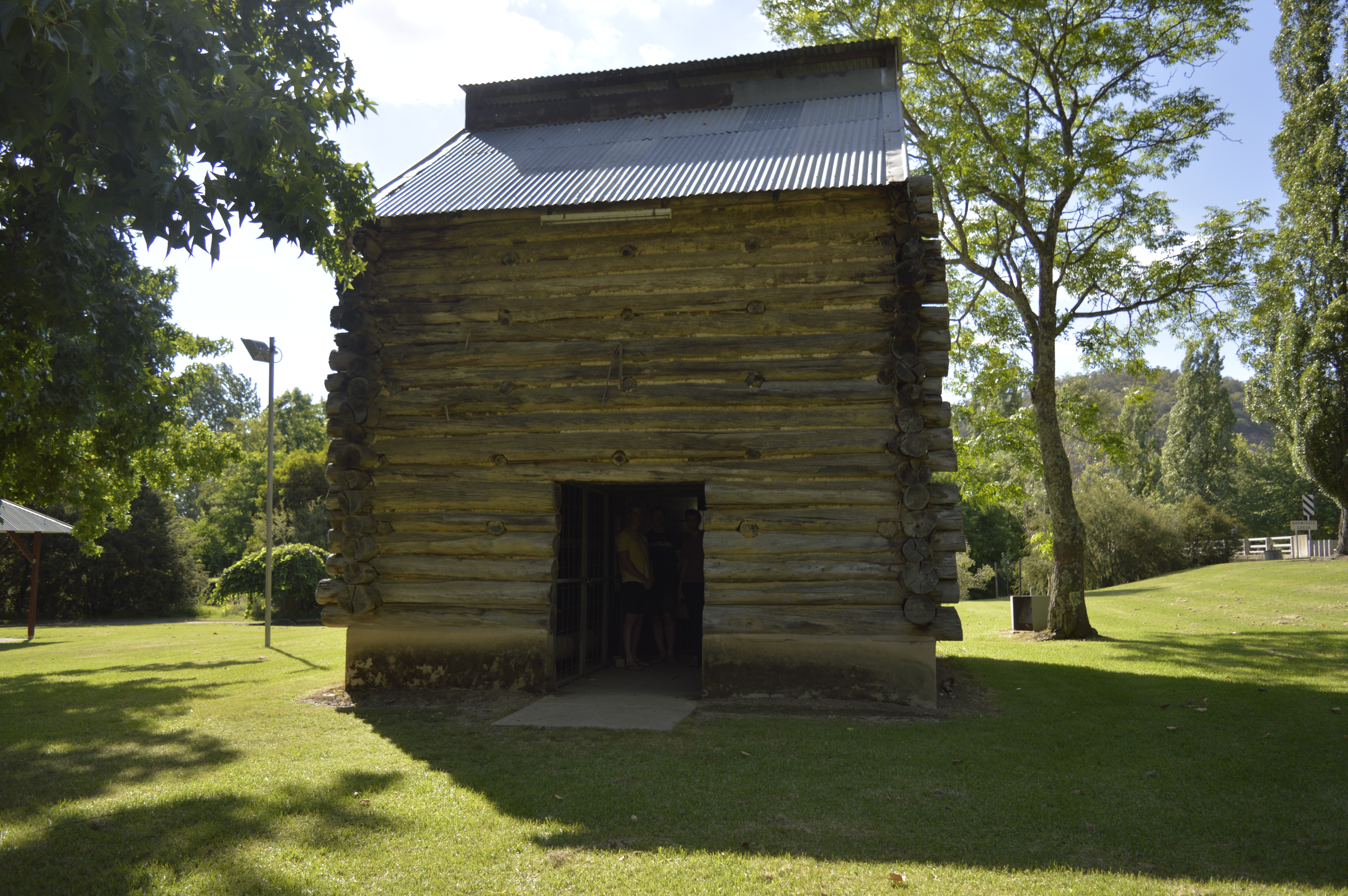
Tobacco drying kiln in Myrtleford, Victoria, Australia, 2018. This kiln was built in 1957, and moved to Rotary Park in 2000. Kilns of this design were built from the early 1930s through to the late 1960s.

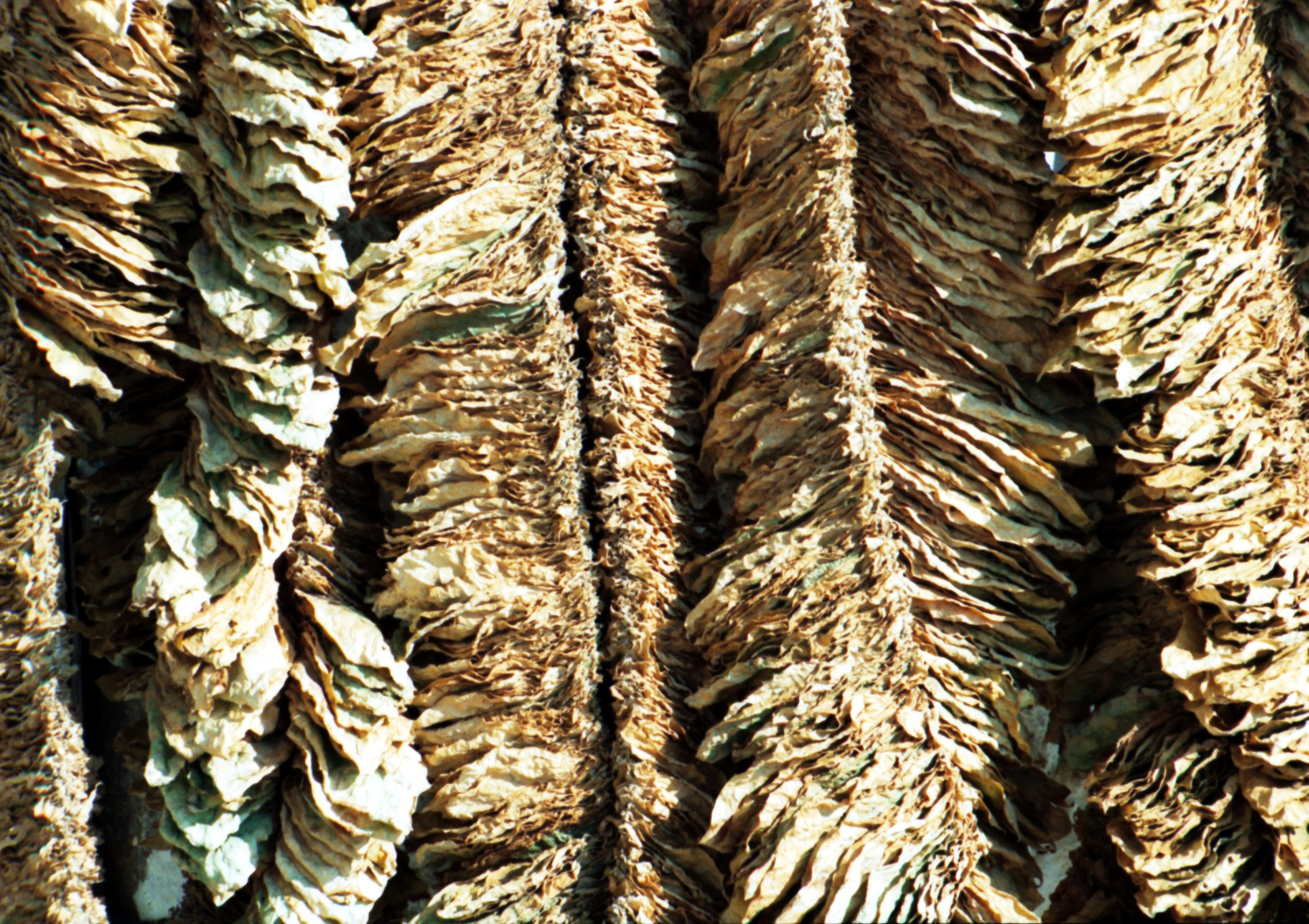
Basma tobacco leaves drying in the sun at Pomak village in Xanthi, Greece

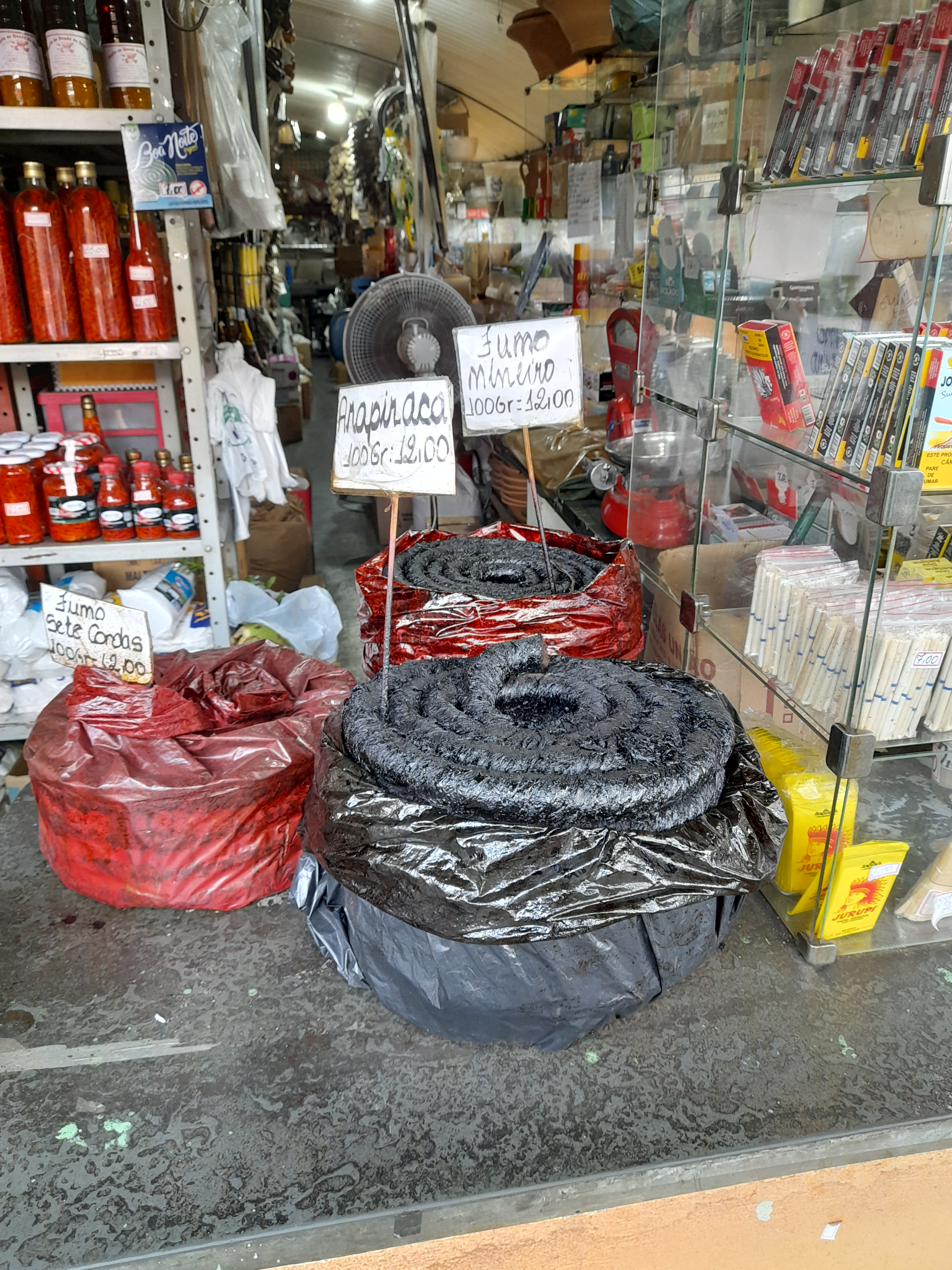
In Minas Gerais, Brazil

== History ==
=== Cultural significance ===
According to Haudenosaunee mythology, tobacco first grew out of Earth Woman's head after she died giving birth to her twin sons, Sapling and Flint.

=== Traditional use ===
Tobacco has long been used in the Americas, with some cultivation sites in Mexico dating back to 1400–1000 BCE. Many Native American tribes traditionally grow and use tobacco. Historically, people from the Northeast Woodlands cultures have carried tobacco in pouches as a readily accepted trade item. It was smoked both socially and ceremonially, such as to seal a peace treaty or trade agreement. In some Native cultures, tobacco is seen as a gift from the Creator, with the ceremonial tobacco smoke carrying one's thoughts and prayers to the Creator.

Some Native Americans consider tobacco to be a medicine and advocate for its respectful usage, rather than a commercial one.

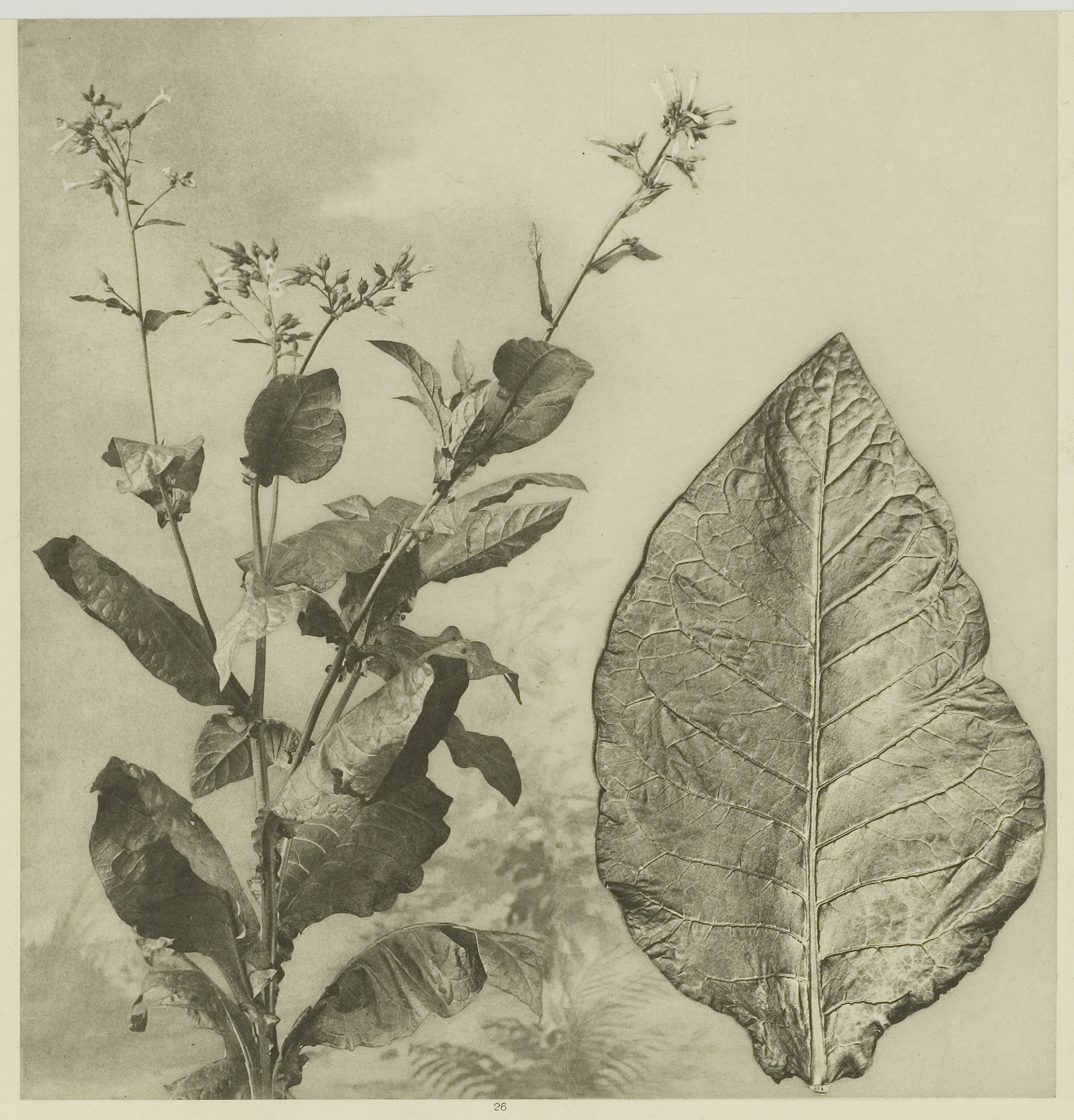
Tobacco plant and tobacco leaf from the Deli plantations in Sumatra, 1905

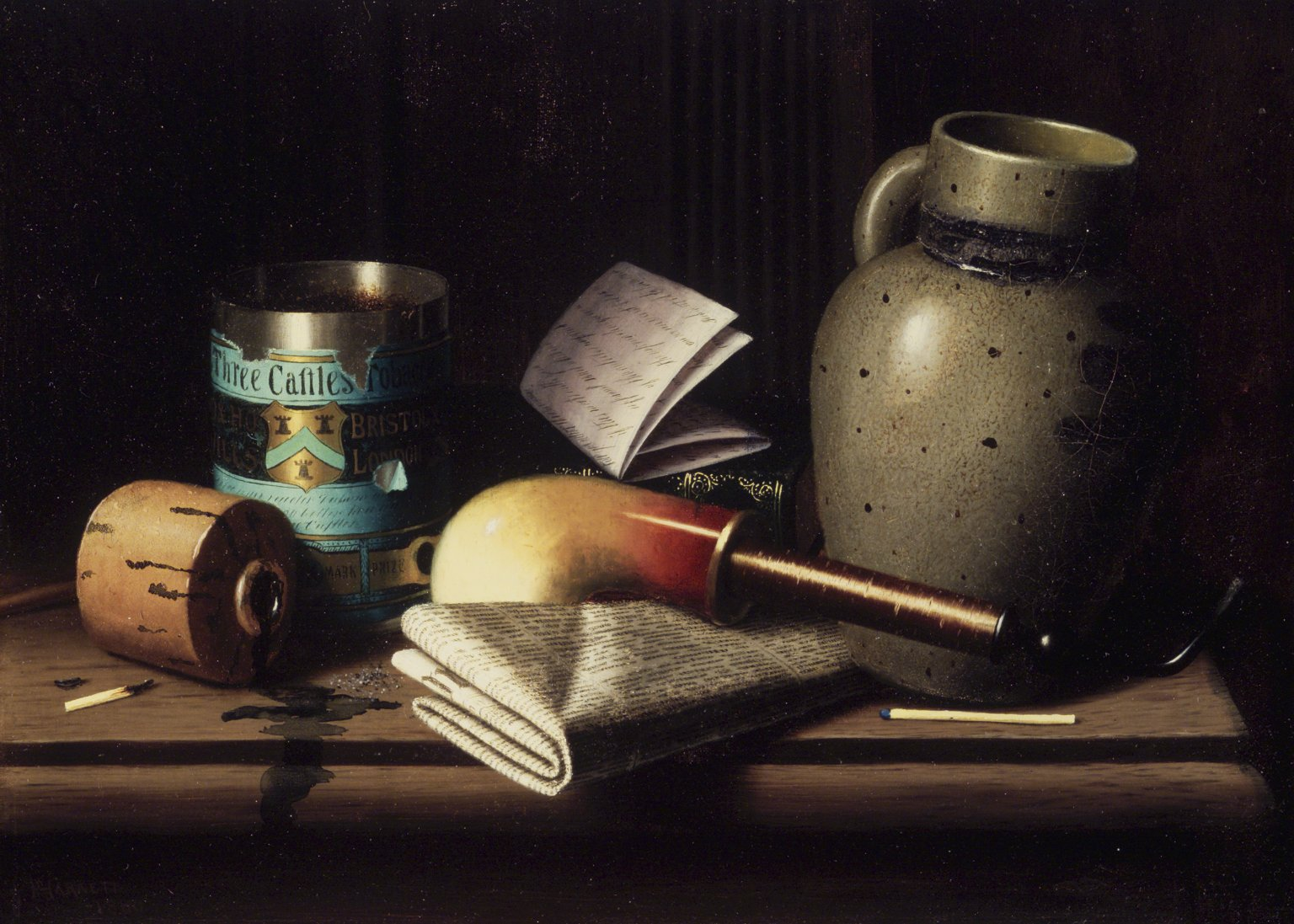
William Michael Harnett (American, 1848–1892), Still Life with Three Castles Tobacco, 1880, Brooklyn Museum

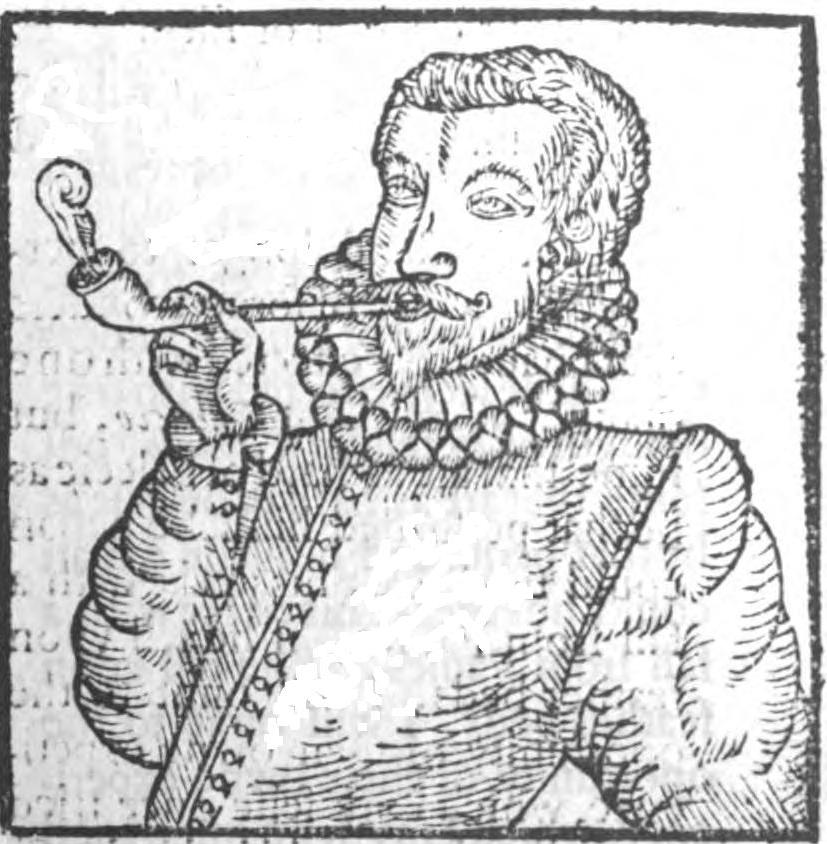
The earliest depiction of a European man smoking, from Tabaco by Anthony Chute, 1595

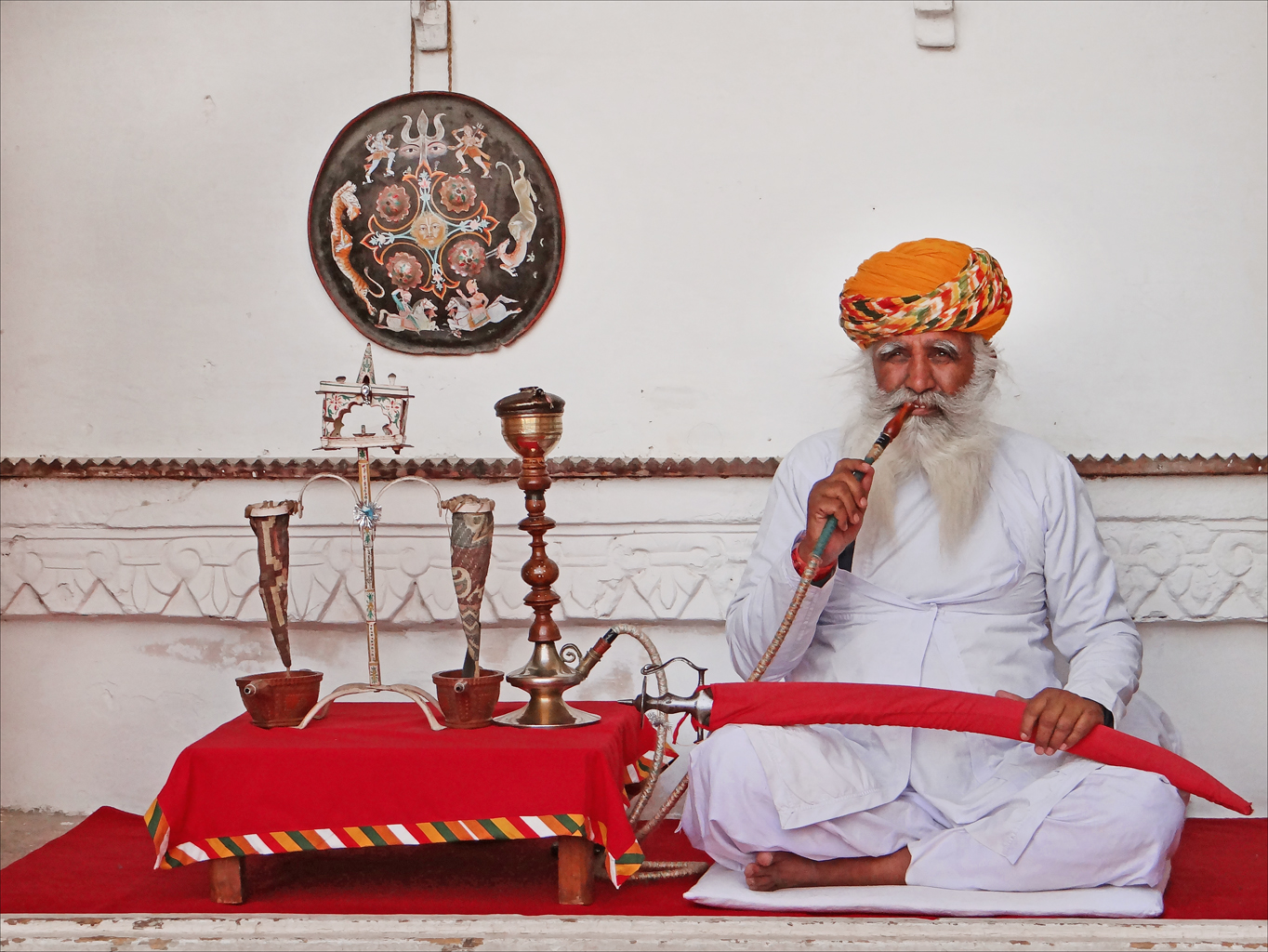
An Indian man smoking tobacco through a hookah, Rajasthan, India

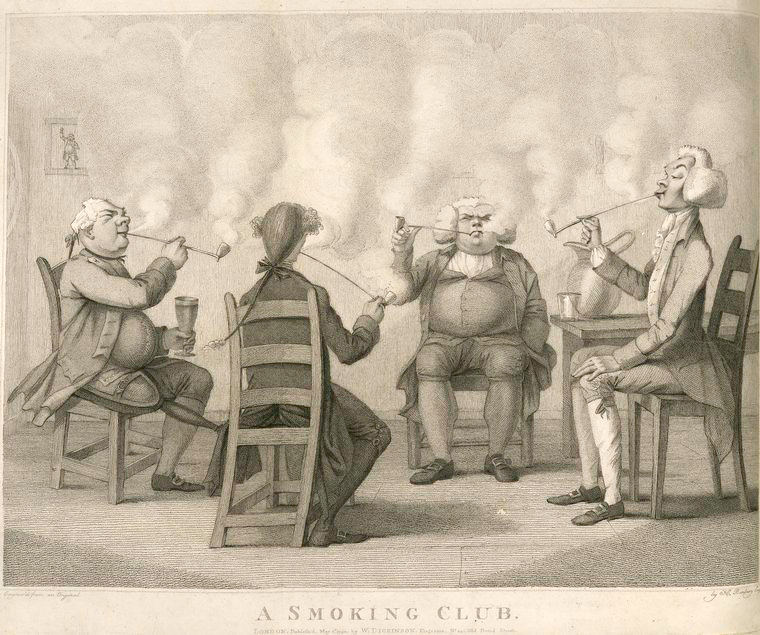
An illustration from Frederick William Fairholt's Tobacco, its History and Association, 1859

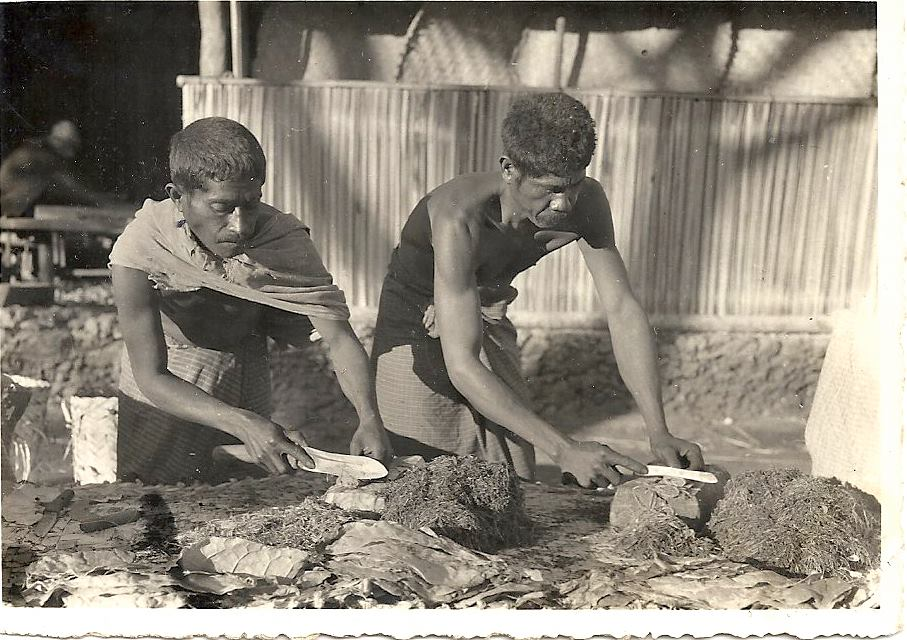
Tobacco production in Portuguese Timor in the 1930s

=== Popularization ===
Following the arrival of the Europeans to the Americas, tobacco became increasingly popular as a trade item. In 1559, Francisco Hernández de Toledo, Spanish chronicler of the Indies, was the first European to bring tobacco seeds to the Old World, following orders of King Philip II of Spain. These seeds were planted in the outskirts of Toledo, more specifically in an area known as "Los Cigarrales" named after the continuous plagues of cicadas (cigarras in Spanish). The word cigar originally derives from the Mayan sikar ("to smoke rolled tobacco leaves"). Before the development of the lighter Virginia and white burley strains of tobacco, the smoke was too harsh to be inhaled. Small quantities were smoked at a time, using a pipe like the midwakh or kiseru, or newly invented waterpipes such as the bong or the hookah (see thuốc lào for a modern continuance of this practice). Tobacco became so popular that the English colony of Jamestown used it as currency and began exporting it as a cash crop; tobacco is often credited as being the export that saved Virginia from ruin. While a lucrative product, the growing expansion of tobacco demand was intimately tied to the history of slavery in the Caribbean.

The alleged benefits of tobacco also contributed to its success. The astronomer Thomas Harriot, who accompanied Sir Richard Grenville on his 1585 expedition to Roanoke Island, thought that the plant "openeth all the pores and passages of the body" so that the bodies of the natives "are notably preserved in health, and know not many grievous diseases, wherewithal we in England are often times afflicted."

Production of tobacco for smoking, chewing, and snuffing became a major industry in Europe and its colonies by 1700.

Tobacco has been a major cash crop in Cuba and in other parts of the Caribbean since the 18th century. Cuban cigars are world-famous.

Cigarettes became increasingly popular in the late 19th century when James Bonsack invented a machine to automate cigarette production. This increase in production allowed tremendous growth in the tobacco industry until the health revelations of the 20th century.

=== Contemporary ===
Following the scientific revelations of the early-to-mid-20th century, tobacco was condemned as a health hazard and eventually became recognized as a cause of cancer, as well as other respiratory and circulatory diseases. In the United States, this led to the adoption of the 1998 Tobacco Master Settlement Agreement, which settled the many lawsuits by the U.S. states in exchange for a combination of yearly payments to the states and voluntary restrictions on advertising and marketing of tobacco products.

In the 1970s, Brown & Williamson crossbred tobacco to produce Y1, a strain containing an unusually high nicotine content, nearly doubling from 3.2 to 3.5% to 6.5%. In the 1990s, this prompted the Food and Drug Administration to allege that tobacco companies were intentionally manipulating the nicotine content of cigarettes.

The desire of many addicted smokers to quit has led to the development of tobacco cessation products.

In 2003, in response to growth of tobacco use in developing countries, the World Health Organization successfully rallied 168 countries to sign the Framework Convention on Tobacco Control. The convention is designed to push for effective legislation and enforcement in all countries to reduce the harmful effects of tobacco. Between 2019 and 2021, concerns about increased COVID-19 health risks due to tobacco consumption facilitated smoking reduction and cessation.

== Biology ==
=== Nicotiana ===
Many species of tobacco are in the genus of herbs Nicotiana. It is part of the nightshade family (Solanaceae) indigenous to North and South America, Australia, south west Africa, and the South Pacific. Most nightshades contain varying amounts of nicotine, a powerful neurotoxin to insects. However, tobacco contains a much higher concentration of nicotine than the others.

Despite containing enough nicotine and other compounds such as germacrene and anabasine and other piperidine alkaloids (varying between species) to deter most herbivores, a number of such animals have evolved the ability to feed on Nicotiana species without being harmed. Nonetheless, tobacco is unpalatable to many species due to its other attributes. For example, although the cabbage looper is a generalist pest, tobacco's gummosis and trichomes can harm early larvae survival. As a result, some tobacco plants (chiefly N. glauca) have become established as invasive weeds in some places.

=== Parasites ===
Tobacco, alongside its related products, can be infested by parasites such as Lasioderma serricorne (the tobacco beetle) and Ephestia elutella (the tobacco moth), which are the most widespread and damaging parasites to the tobacco industry. Infestation can range from the tobacco cultivated in the fields to the tobacco leaves used for manufacturing cigars, cigarillos, cigarettes, etc. Both the larvae of Lasioderma serricorne and caterpillars of Ephestia elutella are considered major pests.

Nicotine is the compound responsible for the addictive nature of tobacco use.

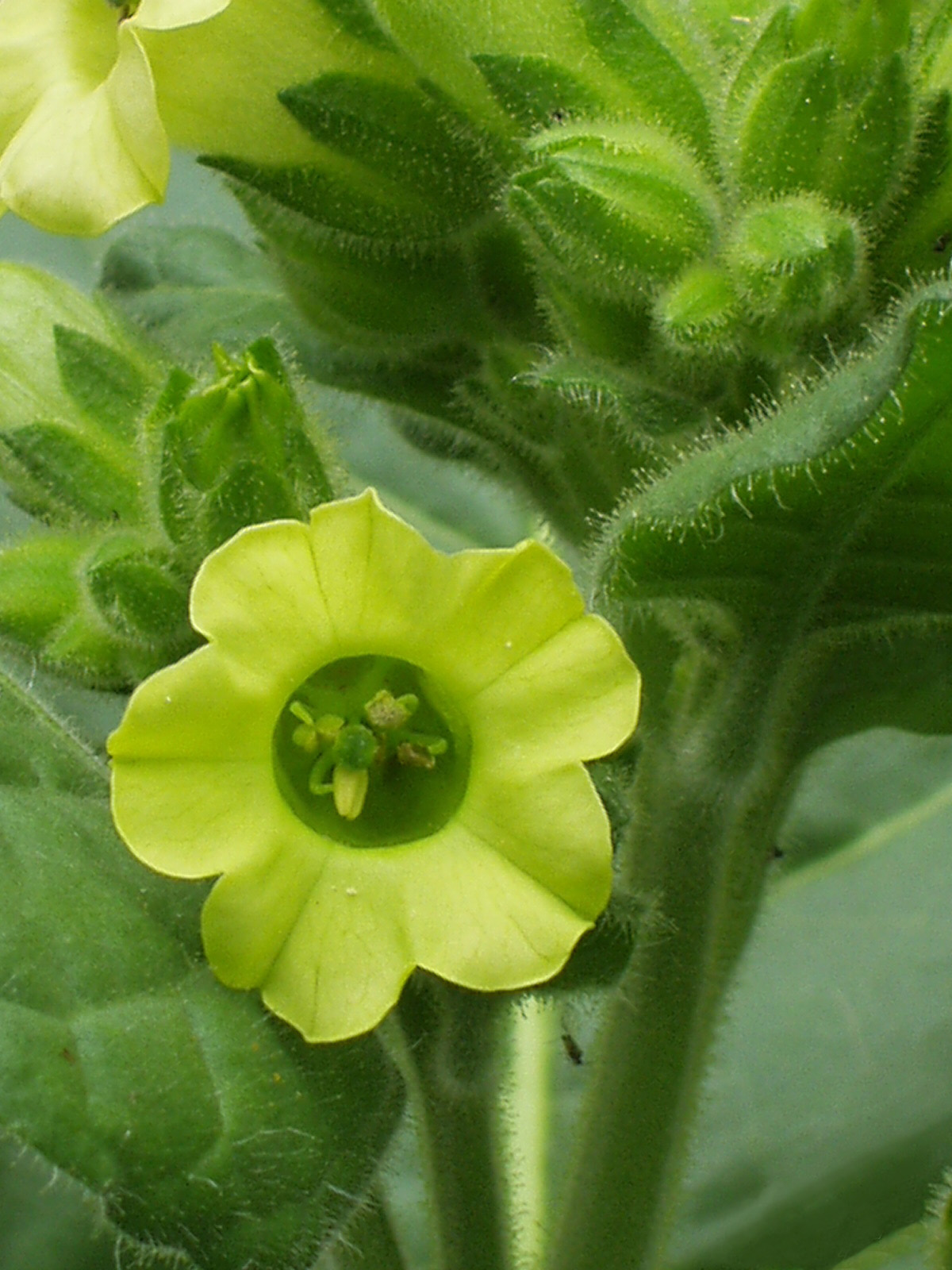
Tobacco (Nicotiana rustica) flower, leaves, and buds

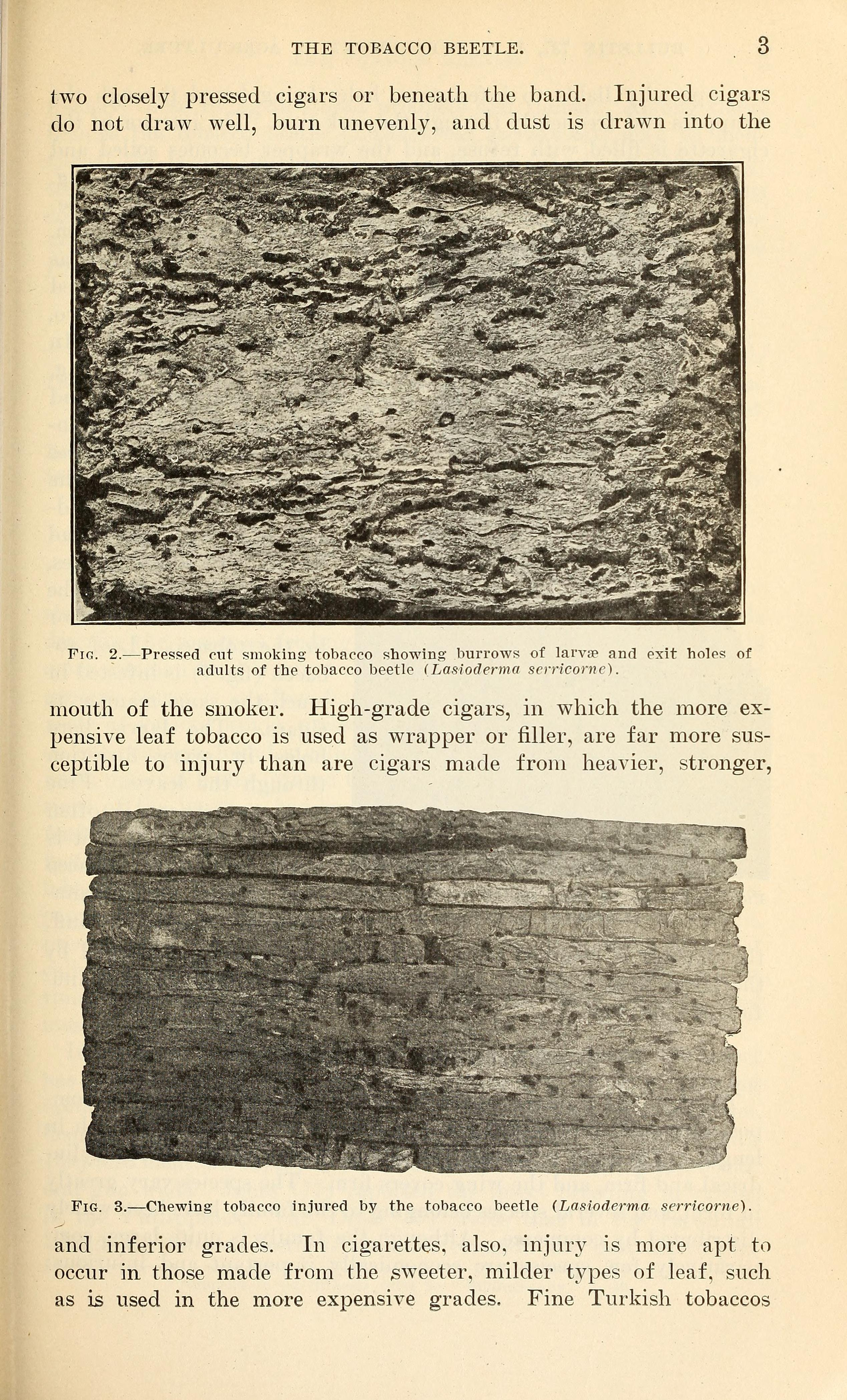
Illustration with photographs of tobacco leaves infested by Lasioderma serricorne (tobacco beetles), from Runner, G. A., The tobacco beetle (1919), Bulletin of the U.S. Department of Agriculture, Biodiversity Heritage Library

== Production ==
=== Cultivation ===
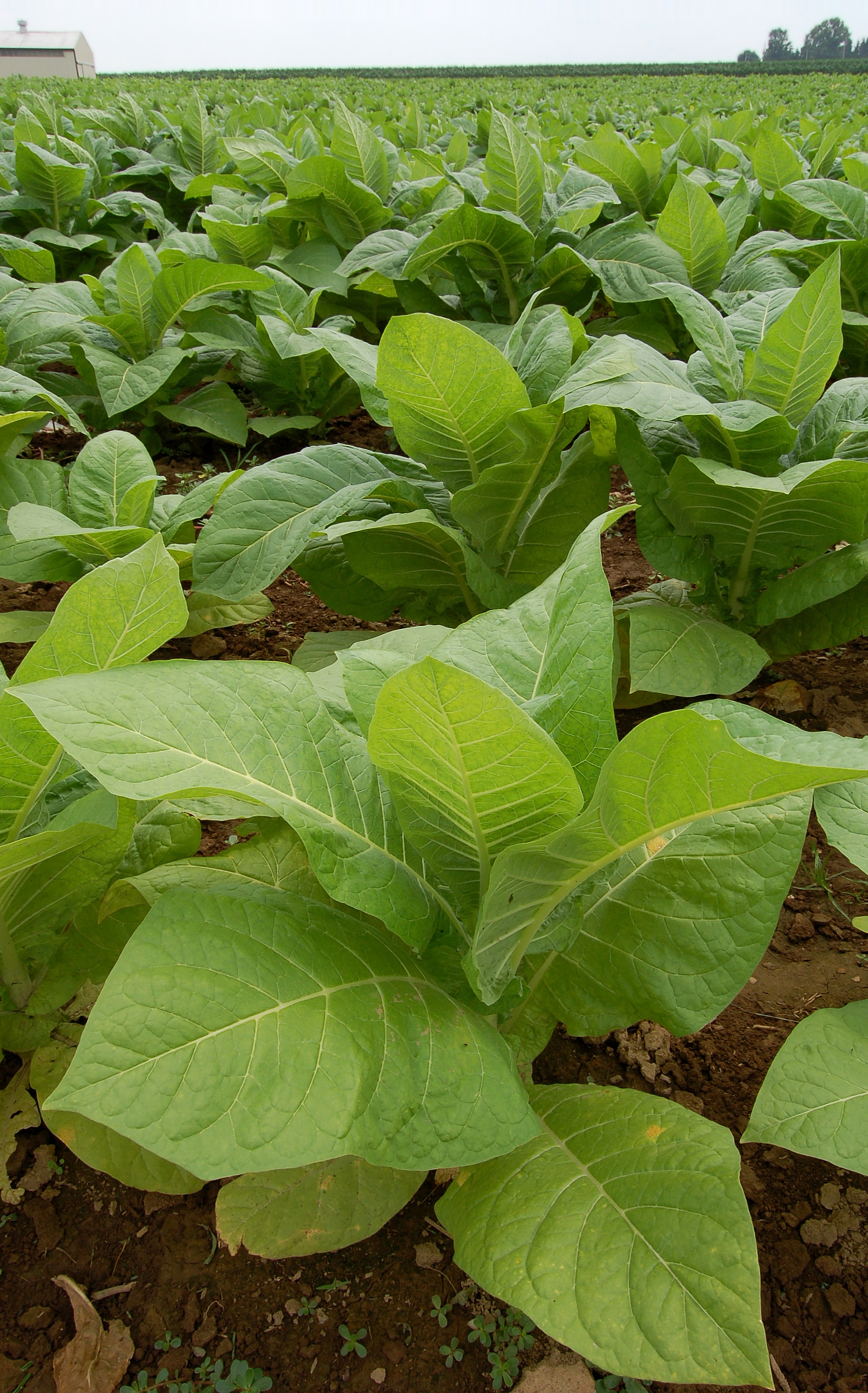
Tobacco plants growing in a field in Intercourse, Pennsylvania

Tobacco is cultivated similarly to other agricultural products. Seeds were at first quickly scattered onto the soil. However, young plants came under increasing attack from flea beetles (Epitrix cucumeris or E. pubescens), which caused destruction of half the tobacco crops in the United States in 1876. By 1890, successful experiments were conducted that placed the plant in a frame covered by thin cotton fabric. Modern tobacco seeds are sown in cold frames or hotbeds, as their germination is activated by light. In the United States, tobacco is often fertilized with the mineral apatite, which partially starves the plant of nitrogen, to produce a more desired flavor.

After the plants are about 8 inches (20 cm) tall, they are transplanted into the fields. Farmers used to have to wait for rainy weather to plant. A hole is created in the tilled earth with a tobacco peg, either a curved wooden tool or deer antler. After making two holes to the right and left, the planter would move forward two feet, select plants from their bag, and repeat. Various mechanical tobacco planters like Bemis, New Idea Setter, and New Holland Transplanter were invented in the late 19th and 20th centuries to automate the process: making the hole, watering it, guiding the plant in—all in one motion.

Tobacco is cultivated annually, and can be harvested in several ways. In the oldest method, still used, the entire plant is harvested at once by cutting off the stalk at the ground with a tobacco knife; it is then speared onto sticks, four to six plants a stick, and hung in a curing barn. In the 19th century, bright tobacco began to be harvested by pulling individual leaves off the stalk as they ripened. The leaves ripen and are pulled off from the ground upwards. Before harvesting, the crop must be topped when the pink flowers develop. Topping always refers to the removal of the tobacco flower before the leaves are systematically harvested. In modern times, large fields are harvested mechanically.

In the U.S., North Carolina and Kentucky are the leaders in tobacco production, followed by Tennessee, Virginia, Georgia, South Carolina and Pennsylvania.

=== Curing ===
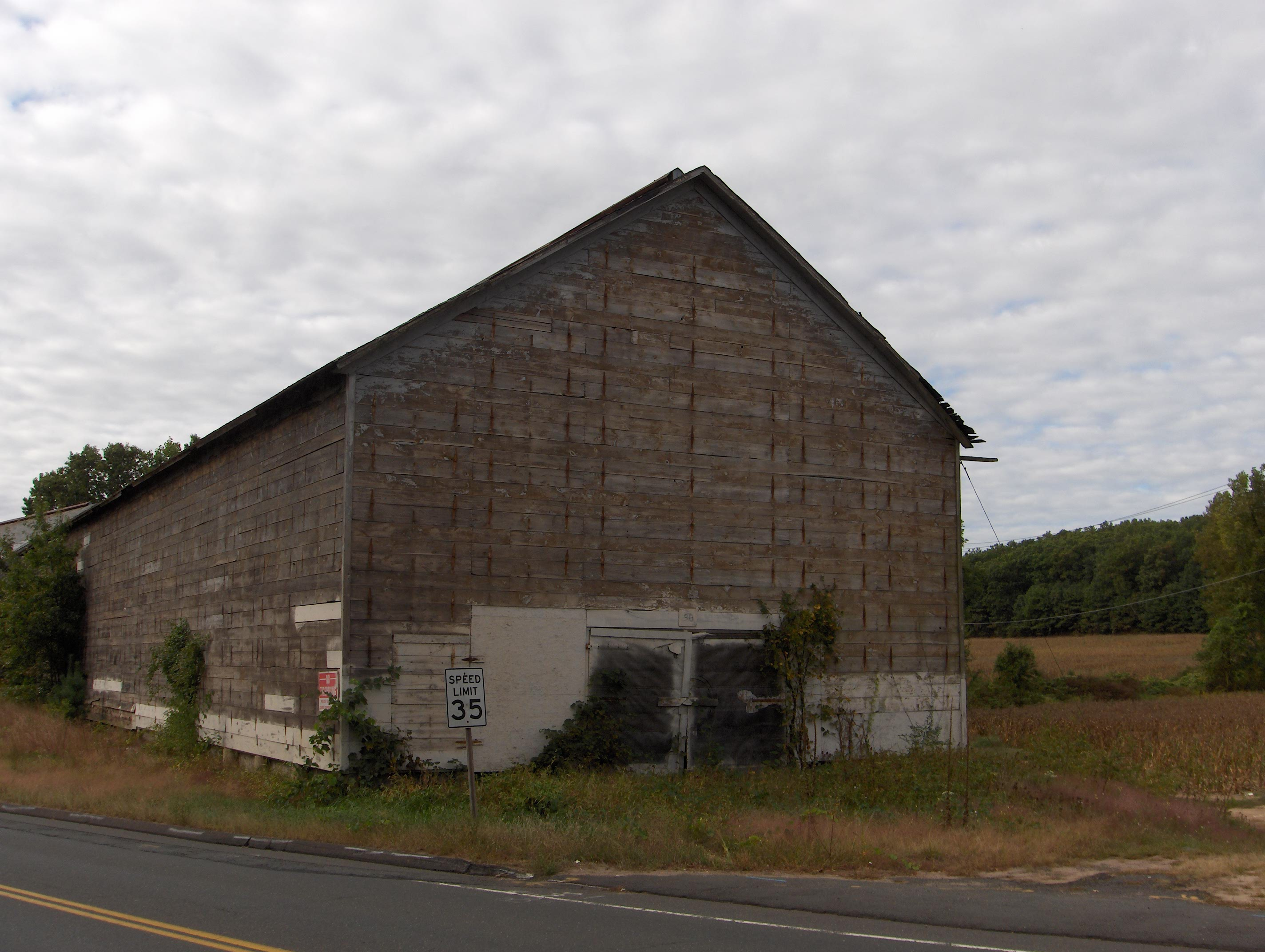
Tobacco barn in Simsbury, Connecticut used for air curing of shade tobacco

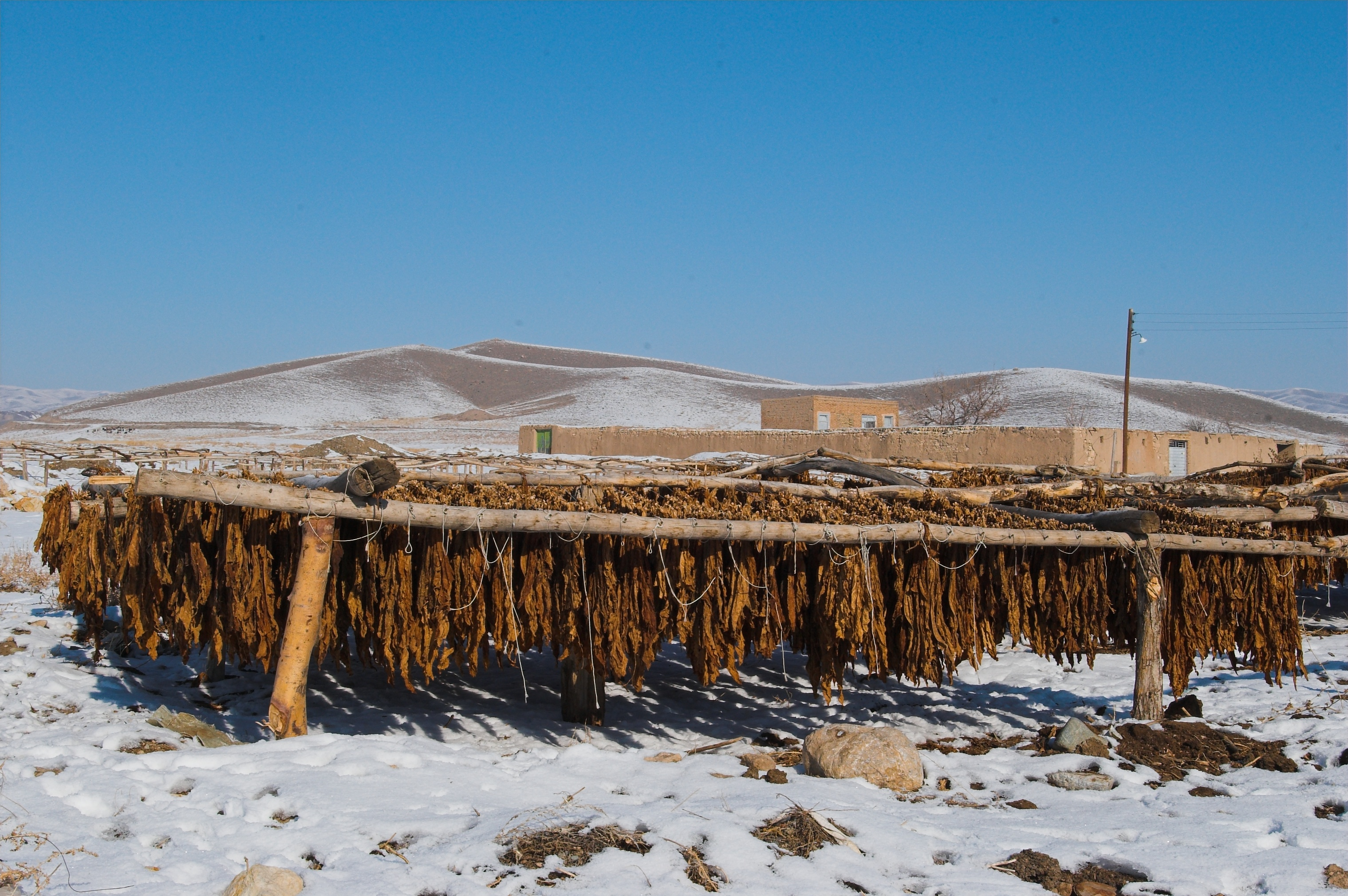
Sun-cured tobacco, Bastam, Iran

Curing and subsequent aging allow for the slow oxidation and degradation of carotenoids in tobacco leaf. This produces certain compounds in the tobacco leaves and gives a sweet hay, tea, rose oil, or fruity aromatic flavor that contributes to the "smoothness" of the smoke. Starch is converted to sugar, which glycates protein, which is oxidized into advanced glycation endproducts (AGEs), a caramelization process that also adds flavor. Inhalation of these AGEs in tobacco smoke contributes to atherosclerosis and cancer. Levels of AGEs are dependent on the curing method used.

Tobacco can be cured through several methods, including:

- Air-cured tobacco is hung in well-ventilated barns and allowed to dry over a period of four to eight weeks. Air-cured tobacco is low in sugar, which gives the tobacco smoke a light, mild flavor, and high in nicotine. Cigar and burley tobaccos are 'dark' air-cured.
- Fire-cured tobacco is hung in large barns where fires of hardwoods are kept on continuous or intermittent low smoulder, and takes between three days and ten weeks, depending on the process and the tobacco. Fire curing produces a tobacco low in sugar and high in nicotine. Pipe tobacco, chewing tobacco, and snuff are fire-cured.
- Flue-cured tobacco was originally strung onto tobacco sticks, which were hung from tier poles in curing barns (Aus: kilns, also traditionally called 'oasts'). These barns have flues run from externally fed fire boxes, heat-curing the tobacco without exposing it to smoke, slowly raising the temperature over the course of the curing. The process generally takes about a week. This method produces cigarette tobacco that is high in sugar and has medium to high levels of nicotine. Most cigarettes incorporate flue-cured tobacco, which produces a milder, more inhalable smoke. It is estimated that 1 tree is cut to flue-cure every 300 cigarettes, resulting in serious environmental consequences.
- Sun-cured tobacco dries uncovered in the sun. This method is used in Turkey, Greece, and other Mediterranean countries to produce oriental tobacco. Sun-cured tobacco is low in sugar and nicotine and is used in cigarettes.

Some tobaccos go through a second stage of curing, known as fermenting or sweating. Cavendish is fermented under pressure after being cased with a solution that typically contains sugar and may also include flavourings.

=== Types ===
The types of tobacco include:

- Aromatic fire-cured is cured by smoke from open fires. In the United States, it is grown in northern middle Tennessee, central Kentucky, and Virginia. Fire-cured tobacco grown in Kentucky and Tennessee is used in some chewing tobaccos, moist snuff, some cigarettes, and as a condiment in pipe tobacco blends. Another fire-cured tobacco is Latakia, which is produced from oriental varieties of N. tabacum. The leaves are cured and smoked over smoldering fires of local hardwoods and aromatic shrubs in Cyprus and Syria.
- Brightleaf tobacco is commonly known as "Virginia tobacco", often regardless of the state where it is planted. Prior to the American Civil War, most tobacco grown in the US was fire-cured dark-leaf. Sometime after the War of 1812, demand for a milder, lighter, more aromatic tobacco arose. Ohio, Pennsylvania and Maryland all innovated with milder varieties of the tobacco plant. Farmers discovered that brightleaf tobacco needs thin, starved soil, and those who could not grow other crops found that they could grow tobacco. Confederate soldiers traded it with each other and Union soldiers, and developed quite a taste for it. At the end of the war, the soldiers went home and a national market had developed for the local crop.
- Broadleaf, a dark tobacco varietal family popular for producing enormous, resilient, and thick wrapper leaves.
- Burley tobacco is an air-cured tobacco used predominantly in cigarette production, but also in pipe tobacco as a balance to Virginias and other leaves high in sugar content. In the U.S., burley tobacco plants are started from pelletized seeds placed in polystyrene trays floated on a bed of fertilized water in March or April.
- Cavendish is more a process of curing and a method of cutting tobacco than a type, but is used to thicken flavors from other tobaccos that might lack a body. The processing and the cut are used to bring out the natural sweet taste in the tobacco. Cavendish can be produced from any tobacco type but is usually one of, or a blend of, Kentucky, Virginia and burley and is most commonly used for pipe tobacco.
- Criollo tobacco is primarily used in the making of cigars. It was by most accounts one of the original Cuban tobaccos that emerged around the time of Columbus.
- Dokha is a tobacco originally grown in Iran, mixed with leaves, bark and herbs for smoking in a midwakh.
- Perique was developed in 1824 through the technique of pressure-fermentation of local tobacco by a farmer, Pierre Chenet. Considered the truffle of pipe tobaccos, it is used as a component in many blended pipe tobaccos but is too strong to be smoked pure. At one time the freshly moist Perique was also chewed, but it is no longer sold for this purpose. It is typically blended with pure Virginia to lend spice, strength and coolness to the blend.
- Shade tobacco is cultivated in Connecticut and Massachusetts. Early Connecticut colonists acquired from the Native Americans the habit of smoking tobacco in pipes, and began cultivating the plant commercially, though the Puritans referred to it as the "evil weed". The Connecticut shade industry has weathered some major catastrophes, including a devastating hailstorm in 1929 and an epidemic of brown spot fungus in 2000, and is in danger of disappearing altogether, given the increase in the value of land.
- Turkish tobacco is a sun-cured, highly aromatic, small-leafed variety (Nicotiana tabacum) grown in Turkey, Greece, Bulgaria and North Macedonia. Originally grown in regions historically part of the Ottoman Empire, it is also known as "oriental". Many of the early brands of cigarettes were made mostly or entirely of Turkish tobacco. Its main use evolved to be included in blends of pipe and especially cigarette tobacco. (A typical American cigarette is a blend of bright Virginia, burley and Turkish.)
- White burley air-cured leaf was found to be milder than other types of tobacco. In 1865 George Webb of Brown County, Ohio, planted red burley seeds he had purchased and found a few of the seedlings had a whitish, sickly look, which became white burley.
- Wild tobacco is native to the southwestern United States, Mexico and parts of South America. Its botanical name is Nicotiana rustica.

=== Global production ===
==== Trends ====
Top tobacco producers, 2020
Country	Production (tonnes)	Note
China	2,134,000	
India	761,335	
Brazil	702,208	F
Zimbabwe	203,488	
Indonesia	199,737	F
United States	176,635	
Mozambique	158,532	F
Pakistan	132,872	F
Argentina	109,333	
Malawi	93,613	F
World	5,886,147	A
No note = official figure, F = FAO Estimate, A = Aggregate (may include official, semiofficial or estimates).

Production of tobacco leaf increased by 40% between 1971, when 4.2 million tons of leaf were produced, and 1997, when 5.9 million tons of leaf were produced. According to the Food and Agriculture Organization (FAO) of the United Nations, tobacco leaf production was expected to hit 7.1 million tons by 2010. This number is a bit lower than the record-high production of 1992, when 7.5 million tons of leaf were produced. The production growth was almost entirely due to increased productivity by developing nations, where production increased by 128%. During that same time, production in developed countries actually decreased. China's increase in tobacco production was the single biggest factor in the increase in world production. China's share of the world market increased from 17% in 1971 to 47% in 1997. This growth can be partially explained by the existence of a low import tariff on foreign tobacco entering China. While this tariff was reduced from 66% in 1999 to 10% in 2004, it has still led to local Chinese cigarettes being preferred over foreign cigarettes because of their lower cost.

Tobacco production

Tobacco yield

==== Major producers ====
Every year, about 5.9 million tons of tobacco are produced. Top producers are China (36.3%), India (12.9%), Brazil (11.9%) and Zimbabwe (3.5%).

==== China ====
Around the peak of global tobacco production, 20 million rural Chinese households were producing tobacco on 2.1 million hectares of land. While it is the major crop for millions of Chinese farmers, growing tobacco is not as profitable as cotton or sugarcane, because the Chinese government sets the market price. While this price is guaranteed, it is lower than the natural market price, because of the lack of market risk. To further control tobacco in their borders, China founded a State Tobacco Monopoly Administration (STMA) in 1982. The STMA controls tobacco production, marketing, imports, and exports, and contributes 12% to the nation's national income. As noted above, despite the income generated for the state by profits from state-owned tobacco companies and the taxes paid by companies and retailers, China's government has acted to reduce tobacco use.

==== India ====
India's Tobacco Board is headquartered in Guntur in the state of Andhra Pradesh. India has 96,865 registered tobacco farmers and many more who are not registered. In 2010, 3,120 tobacco product manufacturing facilities were operating in all of India. Around 0.25% of India's cultivated land is used for tobacco production.

Since 1947, the Indian government has supported growth in the tobacco industry. India has seven tobacco research centers, located in Tamil Nadu, Andhra Pradesh, Punjab, Bihar, Mysore, and West Bengal which houses the core research institute.

==== Brazil ====
In Brazil, around 135,000 family farmers cite tobacco production as their main economic activity. Tobacco has never exceeded 0.7% of the country's total cultivated area. In the southern regions of Brazil, Virginia, and Amarelinho, flue-cured tobacco, as well as burley and Galpão Comum air-cured tobacco, are produced. These types of tobacco are used for cigarettes. In the northeast, darker, air- and sun-cured tobacco is grown. These types of tobacco are used for cigars, twists, and dark cigarettes. Brazil's government has made attempts to reduce the production of tobacco but has not had a successful systematic antitobacco farming initiative. Brazil's government, however, provides small loans for family farms, including those that grow tobacco, through the Programa Nacional de Fortalecimento da Agricultura Familiar.

==== Lebanon ====
Although it was only the 35th biggest tobacco producer in 2023, the crop plays an important role in parts of Lebanon. The cultivation of tobacco in Lebanon dates back to the 17th century and today the crop is grown by all religious sects. In the southern parts of the country, the plant's resilience in difficult conditions—including the climate, the mountainous geography, and recurring wars—makes it an important source of income. The role of tobacco in the region is twofold. On the one hand, it is called the "crop of resistance" as it allows the population to navigate the consequences of a decades-long violent conflict and a certain degree of detachment, making it a symbol of hope, resistance, and resilience. On the other hand, the hard conditions of tobacco farming also made it the "bitter crop," as the farming is oftentimes done by women and children without professional equipment. According to Munira Khayyat, tobacco production in the southern parts of Lebanon, like many other sectors where the state is absent (e.g. health care, employment, education), is overseen by Hezbollah and, though to a minor degree, also by AMAL.

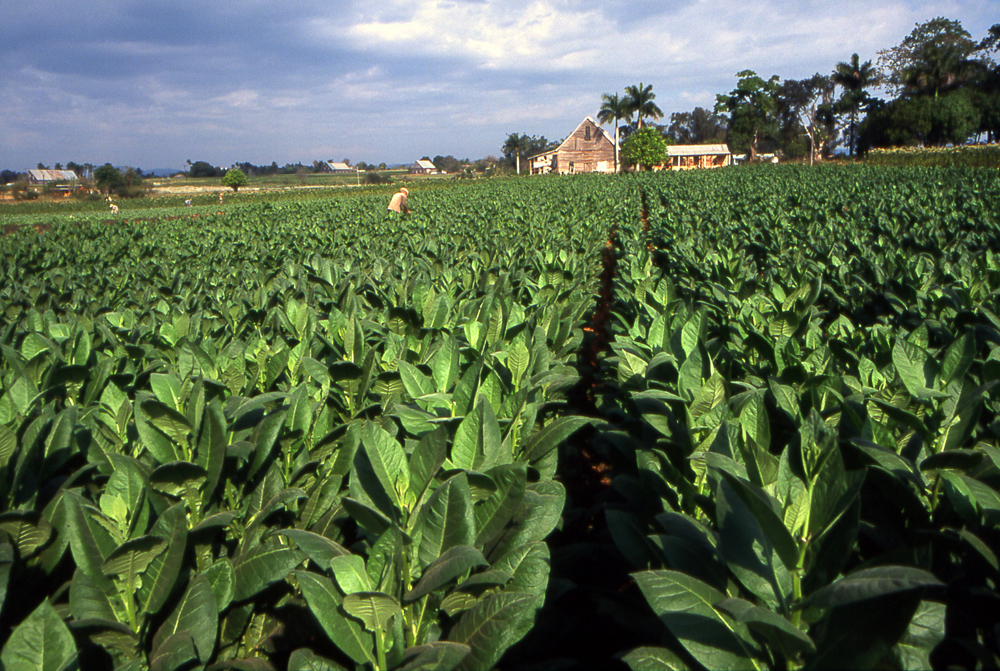
Tobacco plantation, Pinar del Río, Cuba

=== Problems in production ===
==== Child labor ====
The International Labour Office reported that the most child-laborers work in agriculture, which is one of the most hazardous types of work. The tobacco industry houses some of these working children. Use of children is widespread on farms in Brazil, China, India, Indonesia, Malawi, and Zimbabwe. While some of these children work with their families on small, family-owned farms, others work on large plantations. In late 2009, reports were released by the London-based human-rights group Plan International, claiming that child labor was common on Malawi (producer of 1.8% of the world's tobacco) tobacco farms. The organization interviewed 44 teens, who worked full-time on farms during the 2007–08 growing season. The child-laborers complained of low pay and long hours, as well as physical and sexual abuse by their supervisors. They also reported experiencing green tobacco sickness, a form of nicotine poisoning. When wet leaves are handled, nicotine from the leaves gets absorbed in the skin and causes nausea, vomiting, and dizziness. Children were exposed to levels of nicotine equivalent to smoking 50 cigarettes, just through direct contact with tobacco leaves. The effects of nicotine on human brain development in children can permanently alter brain structure and function.

==== Economy ====
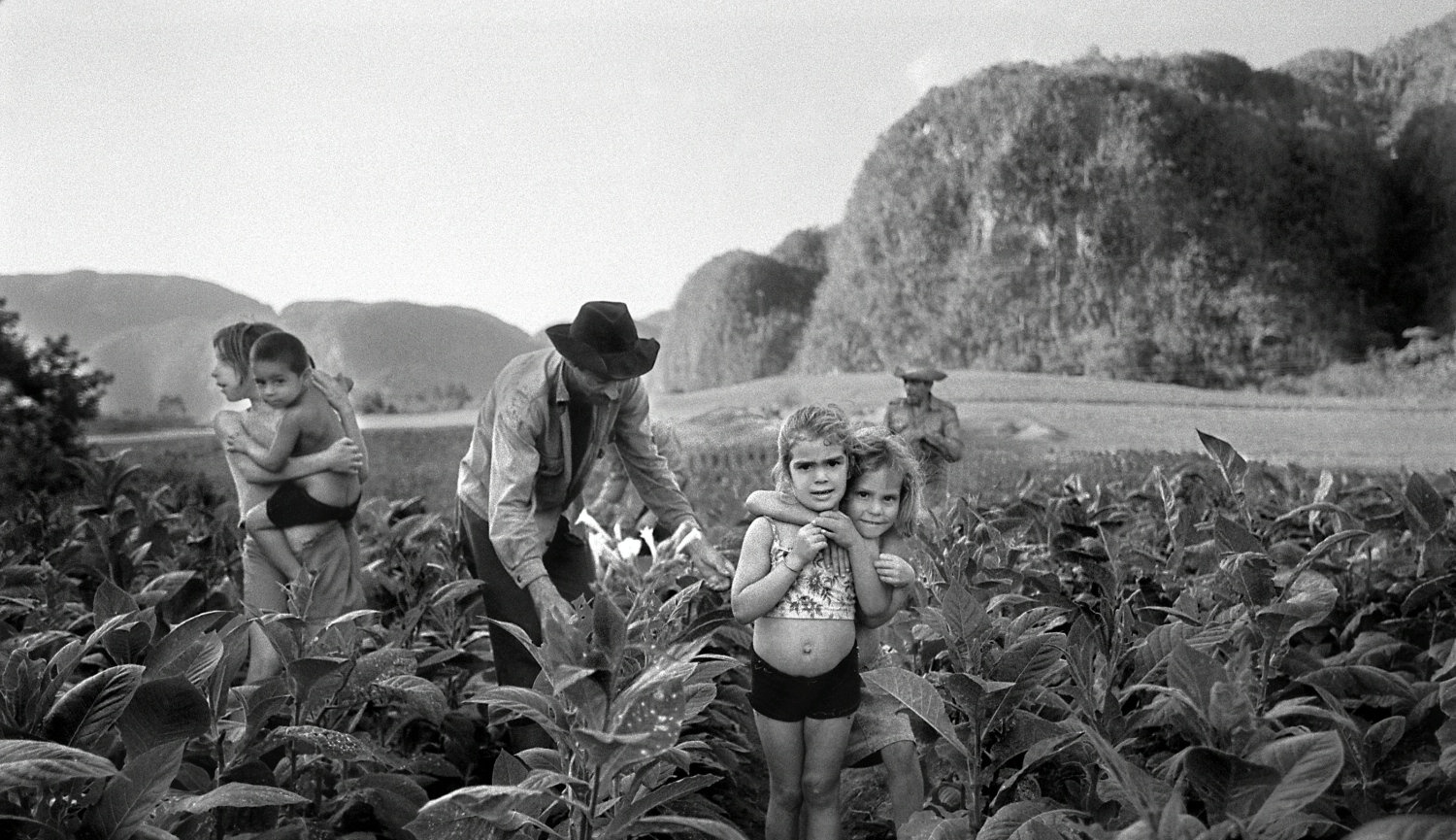
Tobacco harvesting, Viñales Valley, Cuba

Major tobacco companies have encouraged global tobacco production. Philip Morris, British American Tobacco, and Japan Tobacco each own or lease tobacco-manufacturing facilities in at least 50 countries and buy crude tobacco leaf from at least 12 more countries. This encouragement, along with government subsidies, has led to a glut in the tobacco market. This surplus has resulted in lower prices, which are devastating to small-scale tobacco farmers. According to the World Bank, between 1985 and 2000, the inflation-adjusted price of tobacco dropped 37%. Tobacco is the most widely smuggled legal product.

==== Environment ====
Tobacco production requires the use of large amounts of pesticides. Tobacco companies recommend up to 16 separate applications of pesticides just in the period between planting the seeds in greenhouses and transplanting the young plants to the field. Pesticide use has been worsened by the desire to produce larger crops in less time because of the decreasing market value of tobacco. Pesticides often harm tobacco farmers because they are unaware of the health effects and the proper safety protocol for working with pesticides. These pesticides, as well as fertilizers, end up in the soil, waterways, and the food chain. Coupled with child labor, pesticides pose an even greater threat. Early exposure to pesticides may increase a child's lifelong cancer risk, as well as harm their nervous and immune systems.

As with all crops, tobacco crops extract nutrients (such as phosphorus, nitrogen, and potassium) from soil, decreasing its fertility.

Furthermore, the wood used to cure tobacco in some places leads to deforestation. While some big tobacco producers such as China and the United States have access to petroleum, coal, and natural gas, which can be used as alternatives to wood, most developing countries still rely on wood in the curing process. Brazil alone uses the wood of 60 million trees per year for curing, packaging, and rolling cigarettes.

In 2017 WHO released a study on the environmental effects of tobacco.

=== Research ===
Several tobacco plants have been used as model organisms in genetics. Tobacco BY-2 cells, derived from N. tabacum cultivar 'Bright Yellow-2', are among the most important research tools in plant cytology. Tobacco has played a pioneering role in callus culture research and the elucidation of the mechanism by which kinetin works, laying the groundwork for modern agricultural biotechnology. The first genetically modified plant was produced in 1982, using Agrobacterium tumefaciens to create an antibiotic-resistant tobacco plant. This research laid the groundwork for all genetically modified crops.

=== Genetic modification ===
Because of its importance as a research tool, transgenic tobacco was the first genetically modified (GM) crop to be tested in field trials, in the United States and France in 1986; China became the first country in the world to approve commercial planting of a GM crop in 1993, which was tobacco.

==== Field trials ====
Many varieties of transgenic tobacco have been intensively tested in field trials. Agronomic traits such as resistance to pathogens (viruses, particularly to the tobacco mosaic virus (TMV); fungi; bacteria and nematodes); weed management via herbicide tolerance; resistance against insect pests; resistance to drought and cold; and production of useful products such as pharmaceuticals; and use of GM plants for bioremediation, have all been tested in over 400 field trials using tobacco.

==== Production ====
Currently, only the US is producing GM tobacco. The Chinese virus-resistant tobacco was withdrawn from the market in China in 1997. From 2002 to 2010, cigarettes made with GM tobacco with reduced nicotine content were available in the US under the market name Quest.

== Consumption ==
Tobacco is consumed in many forms and through a number of different methods.

=== Anogenital ===
Anogenital usage refers to the use of tobacco in genitals and the anus.

- Vice reported that young people in several Scandinavian countries were placing tobacco pouches under their foreskins and into their anuses as of 2021.
- Taba is a form of tobacco placed in a woman's vagina in West Africa.
- Tobacco smoke enemas were employed by the indigenous peoples of North America to stimulate respiration, injecting the smoke with a rectal tube. Later, in the 18th century, Europeans emulated the Americans. Tobacco resuscitation kits consisting of a pair of bellows and a tube were provided by the Royal Humane Society of London and placed at various points along the Thames.

=== Buccal ===
Buccal usage refers to the use of tobacco in the mouth.

- Chewing tobacco is the oldest way of consuming tobacco leaves. It is consumed orally, in two forms: through sweetened strands ("chew" or "chaw"), or in a shredded form ("dip"). When consuming the long, sweetened strands, the tobacco is lightly chewed and compacted into a ball. When consuming the shredded tobacco, small amounts are placed inside the bottom lip, between the gum and the teeth, where it is gently compacted, thus, it is often called dipping tobacco. Both methods stimulate the salivary glands, which led to the development of the spittoon.
- Creamy snuff is tobacco paste, consisting of tobacco, clove oil, glycerin, spearmint, menthol, and camphor, and sold in a toothpaste tube. It is marketed mainly to women in India and is known by the brand names Ipco (made by Asha Industries), Denobac, Tona, and Ganesh. It is locally known as mishri in some parts of Maharashtra.
- Dipping tobaccos are a form of smokeless tobacco. Dip is occasionally referred to as "chew", and because of this it is commonly confused with chewing tobacco, which encompasses a wider range of products. A small clump of dip is 'pinched' out of the tin and placed between the lower or upper lip and gums. Some brands, as with snus, are portioned in small, porous pouches for less mess.
- Gutka is a preparation of crushed betel nut, tobacco, and sweet or savory flavorings. It is manufactured in India and exported to a few other countries. A mild stimulant, it is sold across India in small, individual-sized packets.
- Kreteks are cigarettes made with a complex blend of tobacco, cloves, and a flavoring "sauce". They were first introduced in the 1880s in Kudus, Java, to deliver the medicinal eugenol of cloves to the lungs.
- Pituri, a nicotine-containing substance traditionally made from Australian tobacco plants, used by Indigenous Australians for chewing and placed between the lower or upper lip and gums.
- Snus is a steam-pasteurized moist powdered tobacco product that is not fermented and induces minimal salivation. It is consumed by placing it (loose or in little pouches) against the upper gums for an extended period of time. It is somewhat similar to dipping tobacco but does not require spitting and is significantly lower in TSNAs.
- Tobacco chewing gum: a gum containing nicotine or tobacco designed to be chewed.
- Tobacco edibles, often in the form of an infusion or a spice, have gained popularity in recent years.
- Tobacco water is a traditional organic insecticide used in domestic gardening. Tobacco dust can be used similarly. It is produced by boiling strong tobacco in water, or by steeping the tobacco in water for a longer period. When cooled, the mixture can be applied as a spray, or painted onto the leaves of garden plants, where it kills insects. Tobacco is, however, banned from use as a pesticide in certified organic production by the USDA's National Organic Program.

=== Inhalation ===
- Betel quid refers to a mixture of areca nut, tobacco, and flavouring ingredients wrapped within a betel leaf.
- Beedi (also known as bidis or biris) are thin, often flavoured cigarettes from India made of tobacco wrapped in a tendu leaf, and secured with coloured thread at one end.
- Cigarettes are a product consumed through inhalation of smoke and manufactured from cured and finely cut tobacco leaves and reconstituted tobacco, often combined with other additives, then rolled into a paper cylinder.
- Cigars are tightly rolled bundles of dried and fermented tobacco, which are ignited so their smoke may be drawn into the smokers' mouths.
- Dokha is a middle eastern tobacco with high nicotine levels grown in parts of Oman and Hatta, which is smoked through a thin pipe called a medwakh. It is a form of tobacco which is dried up and ground and contains little to no additives excluding spices, fruits, or flowers to enhance smell and flavor.
- Heat-not-burn products heat rather than burn tobacco to generate an aerosol that contains nicotine.
- Hookah is a single- or multistemmed (often glass-based) water pipe for smoking. Hookahs were first used in India and Persia; the hookah has gained immense popularity, especially in the Middle East. A hookah operates by water filtration and indirect heat. It can be used for smoking herbal fruits or moassel, a mixture of tobacco, flavouring, and honey or glycerin.
- Roll-your-own, often called 'rollies' or 'roll-ups', are relatively popular in some European countries. These are prepared from loose tobacco, cigarette papers, and filters all bought separately. They are usually cheaper to make.
- Tobacco pipes typically consist of a small chamber (the bowl) for the combustion of the tobacco to be smoked and a thin stem (shank) that ends in a mouthpiece (the bit). Shredded pieces of tobacco are placed in the chamber and ignited.

=== Nasal ===
- Snuff is a ground smokeless tobacco product, inhaled or 'snuffed' through the nose. If referring specifically to the orally consumed moist snuff, see dipping tobacco.

=== Topical ===
- Topical tobacco paste is sometimes used as a treatment for wasp, hornet, fire ant, scorpion, and bee stings. An amount equivalent to the contents of a cigarette is mashed in a cup with about a half a teaspoon of water to make a paste that is then applied to the affected area.

== Influence ==
=== Social ===
Smoking in public was, for a long time, reserved for men, and smoking by women was sometimes associated with promiscuity; in Japan, during the Edo period, prostitutes and their clients often approached one another under the guise of offering a smoke. The same was true in 19th-century Europe.

Following the American Civil War, the use of tobacco, primarily in cigars, became associated with masculinity and power. Modern tobacco use has often been stigmatized; this has spawned quitting associations and antismoking campaigns. Bhutan is the only country in the world where tobacco sales are illegal. Due to its propensity for causing detumescence and erectile dysfunction, some studies have described tobacco as an anaphrodisiacal substance.

=== Religion ===
==== Christianity ====
In Christian denominations of the conservative holiness movement, such as the Allegheny Wesleyan Methodist Connection and Evangelical Wesleyan Church, the use of tobacco and other drugs is prohibited; ¶42 of the 2014 Book of Discipline of the Allegheny Wesleyan Methodist Connection states:

In the judgment of The Allegheny Wesleyan Methodist Connection (Original Allegheny Conference), the use of tobacco is a great evil, unbecoming a Christian, a waste of the Lord's money, and a defilement of the body, which should be the temple of the Holy Ghost. We do, therefore, most earnestly require our members to refrain from its cultivation, manufacture, and sale, and to abstain from its use in all forms, for Jesus' sake. We will not receive as members into our churches nor will we ordain or license to preach or to exhort, persons who use, cultivate, manufacture, or sell tobacco. Using tobacco by a member of a church or of the Conference after being received from this date (June 28, 1927) is a violation of the law of the church, and the offending party should be dealt with according to the judiciary rules.

Members of the Church of Jesus Christ of Latter-day Saints (popularly known as Mormons) adhere to the Word of Wisdom, a religious health code that is interpreted as prohibiting the consumption of tobacco as well as alcohol, coffee, and tea.

==== Islam ====
Most Islamic scholars have condemned tobacco due to its harmful effects on health and most Islamic sects prohibit its use. The earliest fatwa (religious opinion) against tobacco use dates from 1602. While tobacco is not mentioned in the Quran because it did not exist in the Eastern Hemisphere during Muhammad's time, the Quran instructs Muslims to live healthy lives, which does not align with tobacco usage.

==== Sikhism ====
Sikhism, a Dharmic religion from India, considers tobacco consumption as taboo and deeply harmful for health and spirituality. Initiated Sikhs may not consume tobacco in any form.

=== Demographics ===
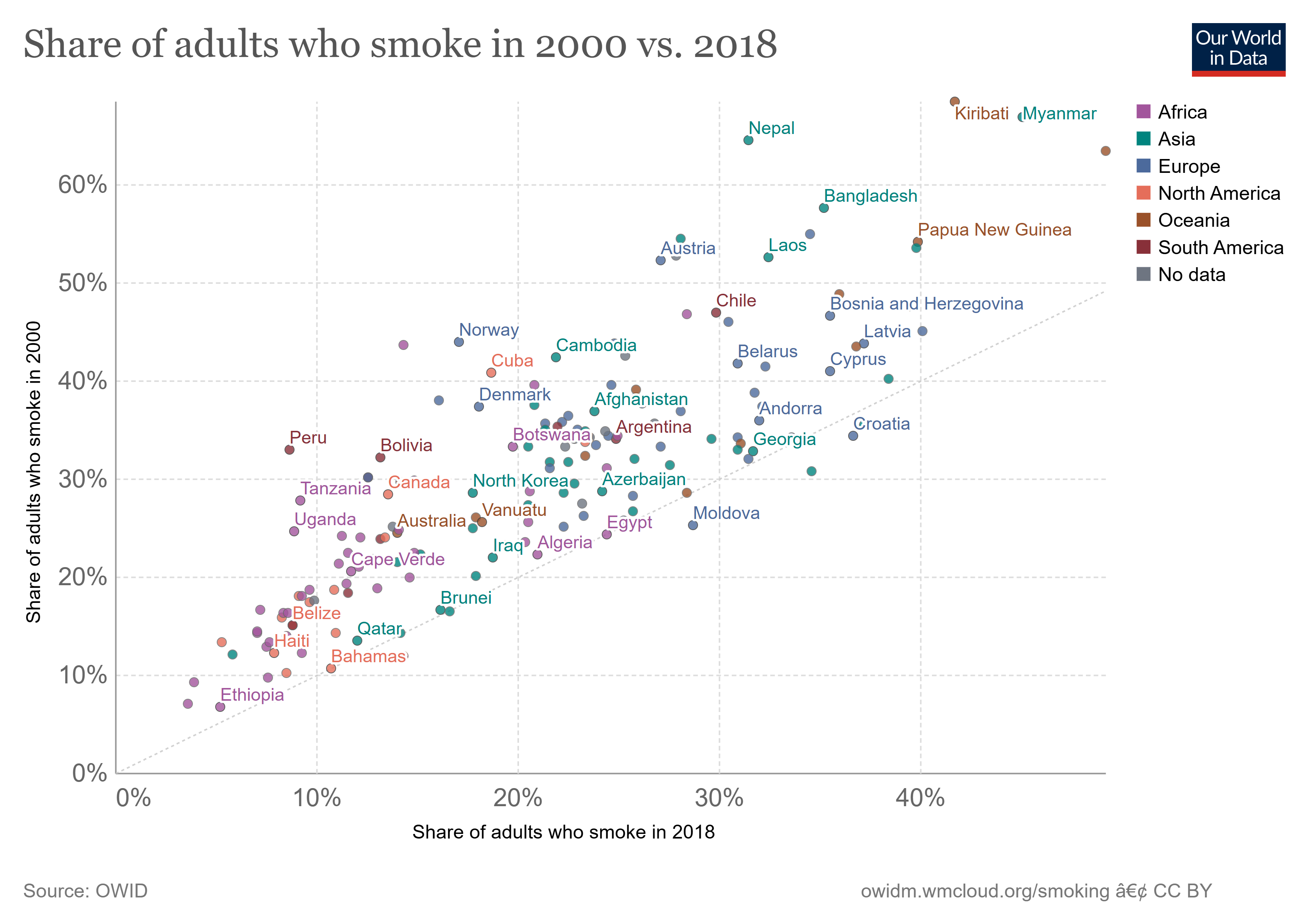
Share of adults who smoke, by country, in 2000 compared with 2018.

Research on tobacco use is limited mainly to smoking, which has been studied more extensively than any other form of consumption. An estimated 1.1 billion people, and up to one-third of the adult population, use tobacco in some form. Smoking is more prevalent among men (however, the gender gap declines with age), the poor, and in transitional or developing countries. A study published in Morbidity and Mortality Weekly Report found that in 2019 approximately one in four youths (23.0%) in the U.S. had used a tobacco product during the past 30 days. This represented approximately three in 10 high school students (31.2%) and approximately one in eight middle school students (12.5%).

The prevalence of smoking continue to rise in developing countries, but have leveled off or declined in developed countries. Smoking rates in the United States have dropped by half from 1965 to 2006, falling from 42% to 20.8% in adults. In the developing world, tobacco consumption is rising by 3.4% per year.

=== Health effects ===
Table from the 2010 DrugScience study ranking various drugs (legal and illegal) based on statements by drug-harm experts. Tobacco was found to be the sixth overall most dangerous drug.

Deaths from tobacco, alcohol and drugs

Common adverse effects of tobacco smoking

According to the World Health Organization, tobacco kills more than 8 million people every year worldwide, including about 1.3 million non-smokers exposed to secondhand smoke.

==== Chemicals ====
Tobacco smoking harms health because of the toxic chemicals in tobacco smoke, including carbon monoxide, cyanide, and carcinogens, which have been proven to cause heart and lung diseases and cancer. Thousands of different substances in cigarette smoke, including polycyclic aromatic hydrocarbons (such as benzopyrene), formaldehyde, cadmium, nickel, arsenic, tobacco-specific nitrosamines, and phenols contribute to the harmful effects of smoking.

According to the World Health Organization, tobacco is the single greatest cause of preventable death globally. WHO estimates that tobacco caused 5.4 million deaths in 2004 and 100 million deaths over the course of the 20th century. Similarly, the United States Centers for Disease Control and Prevention describe tobacco use as "the single most important preventable risk to human health in developed countries and an important cause of premature death worldwide." Due to these health consequences, it is estimated that a 10 hectare (approximately 24.7 acre) field of tobacco used for cigarettes causes 30 deaths per year – 10 from lung cancer and 20 from other cigarette-induced diseases like cardiac arrest, gangrene, bladder cancer, mouth cancer, etc.

The harms caused by inhaling tobacco smoke include diseases of the heart and lungs, with smoking being a major risk factor for heart attacks, strokes, chronic obstructive pulmonary disease (emphysema), and cancer (particularly cancers of the lungs, larynx, mouth, and pancreas). Cancer is caused by inhaling carcinogenic substances in tobacco smoke.

Inhaling secondhand tobacco smoke (which has been exhaled by a smoker) can cause lung cancer in nonsmoking adults. In the United States, about 3,000 adults die each year due to lung cancer from secondhand smoke exposure. Heart disease caused by secondhand smoke kills around 46,000 nonsmokers every year.

In children, exposure to secondhand tobacco smoke is associated with a higher incidence and severity of respiratory illnesses, middle ear disease, and asthma attacks. Each year in the United States, secondhand smoke exposure causes 24,500 infants to be born with low birth weight, 71,900 Preterm births, 202,300 episodes of asthma, and 790,000 health care visits for ear infections.

The addictive alkaloid nicotine is a stimulant, and popularly known as the most characteristic constituent of tobacco. In drug effect preference questionnaires, a rough indicator of addictive potential, nicotine scores almost as highly as opioids. Users typically develop tolerance and dependence. Nicotine is known to produce conditioned place preference, a sign of psychological enforcement value. In one medical study, tobacco's overall harm to user and self was determined at three percent below cocaine, and 13 percent above amphetamines, ranking sixth most harmful of the 20 drugs assessed.

Tobacco also contains 2,3,6-Trimethyl-1,4-naphthoquinone (sometimes called 2,3,6-TQ and TMN) which is a reversible monoamine oxidase inhibitor of type A and B with a binding affinity somewhat similar to that of clorgyline and deprenyl. It is a stronger dopamine releasing agent than nicotine and inhibits dopamine metabolism from its MAOI activity. Tobacco also contains Harmine and Norharmine which is a reversible MAO-A inhibitor. The MAO-A activity of tobacco alkaloids have been thought to play a role in the addictive qualities of tobacco.

==== Radioactivity ====
As the plant grows, radon decay products (that come from decay of radium in fertilizer), like polonium-210 and lead-210, cling to the sticky hairs on the bottom of tobacco leaves.

Polonium-210 is a radioactive trace contaminant of tobacco, providing additional explanation for the link between smoking and bronchial cancer. The radioactive particles build up over time in the lungs and a UCLA study has estimated that the radiation from 25 years of smoking would cause over 120 deaths per thousand smokers.

However, PAHs and nitrosamines are likely to play major roles in the development of lung cancer, rather than Po-210.

=== Economic ===
Tobacco makes a significant economic contribution. The global tobacco market in 2010 was estimated at US$760 billion, excluding China. The global revenues from tobacco taxes in 2013–2014 was approximately $269 billion.

In China, cigarette manufacturing is one of the few profitable state-owned industries. For example, in 1998 the 1,429 state-owned enterprises in Yunnan province had revenue of Renminbi (RMB) 69.1 billion (US$8.3 billion) while eight cigarette manufacturing plants alone accounted for about 53 percent (or RMB 36.2 billion) of total provincial industry sales. The Chinese government also collects tax on tobacco products. Tax revenues from cigarettes increased from 740 to 842 billion Chinese yuan between 2014 and 2016. This generated an additional 101 billion Chinese yuan in tax revenues for the government.

In India, tobacco generates approximately 20 billion Indian rupees (US$0.45 billion) of income per annum as a result of employment, income and government revenue.

Statistica estimates that in the U.S. alone, the tobacco industry has a market of US$121 billion, despite the fact the CDC reports that US smoking rates are declining steadily. In terms of health expenditures, cigarette smoking contributed to more than $225 billion (or 11.7%) of annual healthcare spending in the U.S. in 2014. Smoking-attributable healthcare spending increased more than 30% for Medicaid between 2010 and 2014.

In the US, the decline in the number of smokers, the end of the Tobacco Transition Payment Program in 2014, and competition from growers in other countries, made tobacco farming economics more challenging.

Of the 1.22 billion smokers worldwide, 1 billion of them live in developing or transitional economies, and much of the disease burden and premature mortality attributable to tobacco use disproportionately affect the poor. While smoking prevalence has declined in many developed countries, it remains high in others, and is increasing among women and in developing countries. Between one-fifth and two-thirds of men in most populations smoke. Women's smoking rates vary more widely but rarely equal male rates.

Tobacco users must also spend a significant amount of money on cigarettes to maintain regular use, as tobacco products are often heavily taxed by governments. For example, a pack a day smoker in the state of New York would have to spend around $4,690.25 a year on cigarettes alone.

In Indonesia, the lowest income group spends 15% of its total expenditures on tobacco. In Egypt, more than 10% of low-income household expenditure is on tobacco. The poorest 20% of households in Mexico spend 11% of their income on tobacco.

=== Advertising ===
The tobacco industry advertises its products through a variety of media, including sponsorship, particularly of sporting events. Because of the health risks of these products, this is now one of the most highly regulated forms of marketing. Some or all forms of tobacco advertising are banned in many countries.

== See also ==
- Biorefining of tobacco
- Smoking cessation
- List of tobacco-related topics
