= Cavendish tobacco =

Type of heat-treated tobacco

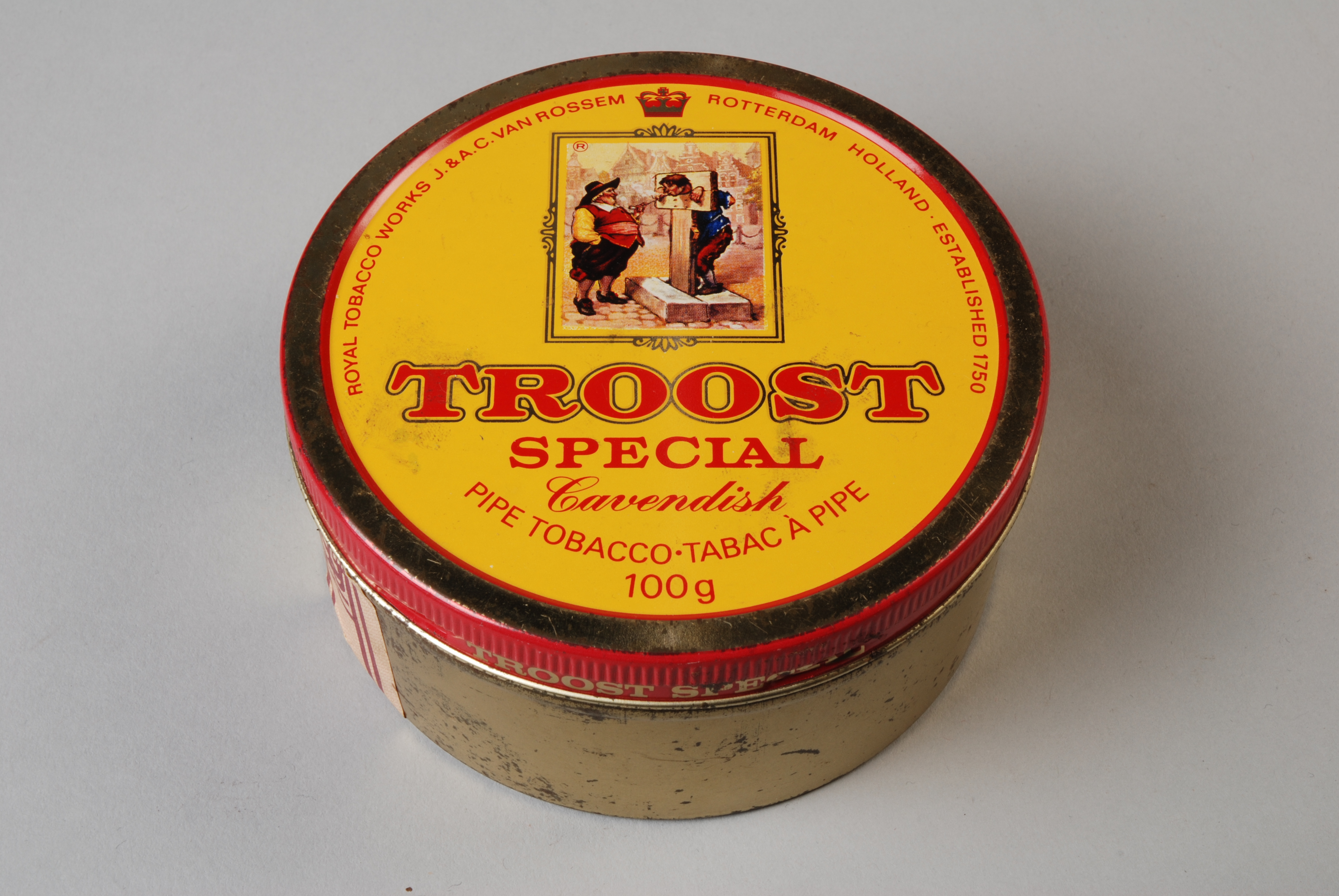
A tin of Troost Special Cavendish pipe tobacco, produced by the Royal Tobacco Works J. & A.C. van Rossem of Rotterdam, Netherlands, c. 1960–1975

Cavendish tobacco is tobacco that has been heat treated with fire or steam and then subjected to heavy pressure in order to produce a sweet taste with a moist texture. American, Dutch, and Danish varieties involve the addition of flavorings; while British Cavendish, commonly known as unsweetened or unflavored Cavendish brings out the natural sugars in the tobacco through pressure applied during the preparation process. Cavendish tobacco is named after Sir Thomas Cavendish.

The varieties of tobacco leaves most commonly used to create Cavendish tobacco are Virginia and Burley.

The flavorings include sugar, cherry, maple, honey, licorice, chocolate, coconut, rum, strawberry, vanilla, walnut and bourbon.

== Process ==
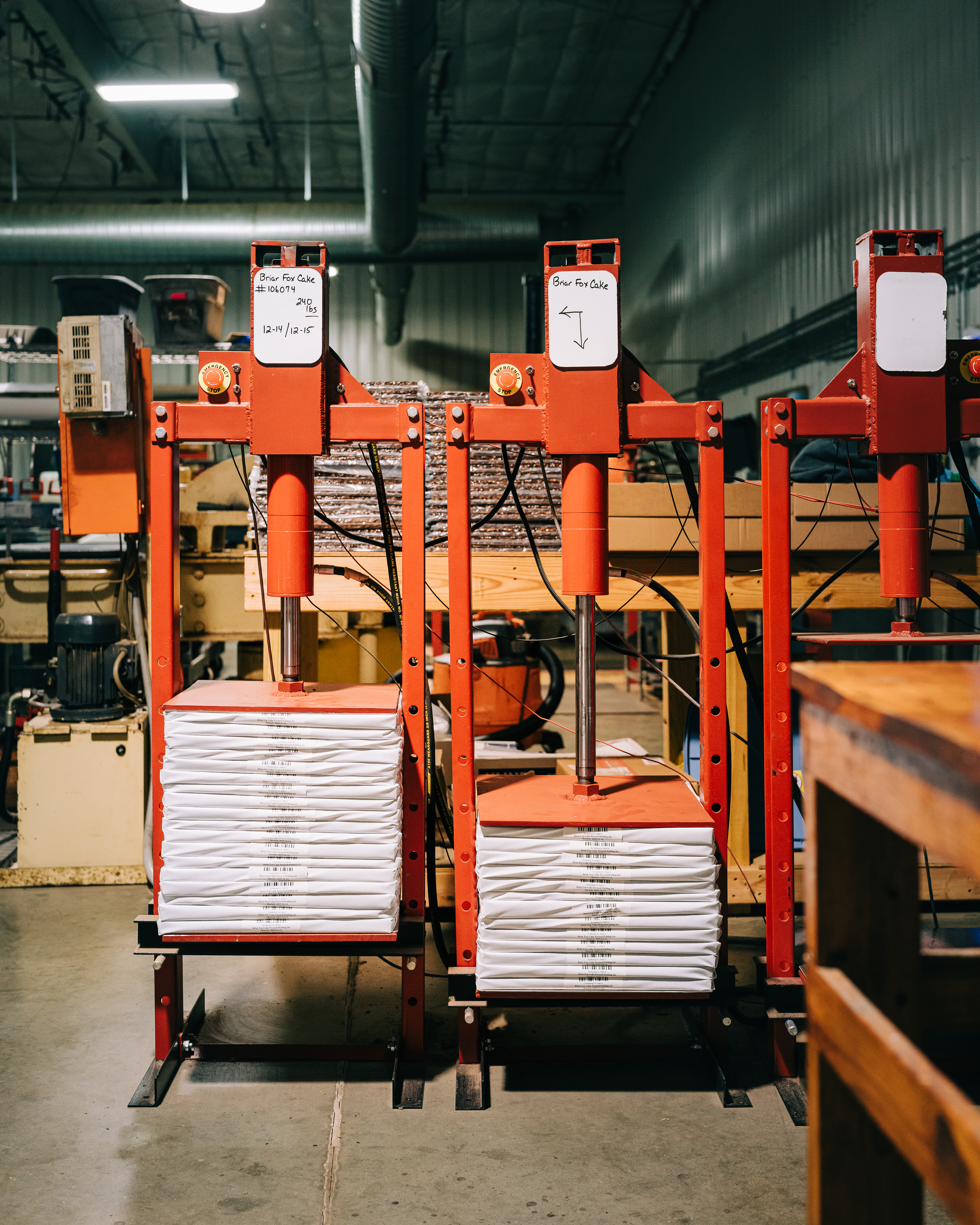
Tobacco cakes compressed under a hydraulic press during Cavendish processing at Cornell & Diehl

After being cured, Cavendish tobaccos are steamed and then pressed into a cake approximately 2.5 cm (1 in) thick. Then the cake is heated using fire or steam, allowing the tobacco to ferment. After, the fermented cakes are cut into slices and packed into pipes (a large wooden barrel). Finally, flavoring may be added before the leaves are pressed again. English Cavendish uses a dark flue or fire cured Virginia, which is steamed and then stored under pressure to allow it to cure and ferment for several days or weeks.
