= Gildersleeve =

Gildersleeve is a surname. Notable people with the surname include:

- Basil L. Gildersleeve (1831–1924), American classical scholar
- Charles Fuller Gildersleeve (1833–1906), Canadian lawyer and politician
- Fred Gildersleeve (1881–1958), American photographer
- Henry Gildersleeve (shipbuilder) (1817–1894), American shipbuilder
- Henry Alger Gildersleeve (1840–1923), American jurist
- John Gildersleeve (born 1944), British businessman
- Overton Smith Gildersleeve (1825–1864), Canadian lawyer and politician
- Sarah Gildersleeve Fife (1885–1949), American bibliophile, gardener
- Virginia Gildersleeve (1877–1965), American academic, long-time Dean of Barnard College
- Willard Gildersleeve (1886–1976), head coach of New Hampshire's football team in 1909 and Massachusetts' team in 1910
- William Camp Gildersleeve (1795–1871), American abolitionist

== See also ==
- Andrew Gildersleeve Octagonal Building, historic octagonal house in Mattituck, New York
- Gildersleeve House in Hudson, McLean County, Illinois, US
- Gildersleeve Mountain in Kirtland, Ohio, US
- The Great Gildersleeve (1941–1957), US radio comedy show, one of broadcast history's earliest spin-off programs
