= Jorge Oller =

Costa Rican writer and entrepreneur (born 1957)

- Born: Jorge Oller Alpírez; 17 July 1957 (age 69); San Jose, Costa Rica
- Citizenship: Spanish
- Education: University of Costa Rica, ESADE Business School
- Occupations: Journalist, writer
- Writing career
- Language: Spanish
- Website: www.jorgeoller.com

Jorge Oller Alpírez (born July 17, 1957) is a Costa Rican writer and entrepreneur who founded the advertising company Tribu Group.

Oller Alpírez is known for his influence in the business field of advertising and creativity in Costa Rica and Central America after founding Grupo Tribu now known as Havas Costa Rica.

== Early life and education ==
Oller was born in Costa Rica in 1957. He completed his primary education at the Methodist School and his secondary education at Saint Francis College, completing them in 1974. He graduated in Business Administration from the University of Costa Rica. In 2002 he obtained his MBA from INCAE and the Global MBA from Georgetown University in a double degree with ESADE Business School in 2018.

== Career ==
His executive career began at McCann-Erickson, where he worked in Costa Rica, Honduras and Mexico. Later, he founded Consumer Publicidad in San José, a company that migrated over the years through various affiliations, such as Tribu Saatchi & Saatchi, Tribu DDB and Havas Tribu.

For 25 years he was a partner at Dipo, a family business in the field of distribution of mass consumer products.

Among the most recognized companies of the Tribu Group, the following stand out: Tribu (today Havas Costa Rica), Bosz Digital (today Prodigious of the Publicis Groupe), Darwin Zone (today Lionbridge Costa Rica) and others such as: Camedia Central, Promotica, Campus Tribu, Pstiv Media, Infirma and Alma Latina.

=== Social and cultural work ===
He is also the founder of Ollería, a start-up that focused on creative solutions, and has participated in projects such as The Openhouse Project and Vía Costarricense. He was president of the Community of Collective Communication Companies for four years, and a representative of the prestigious Cannes Lions festival for 15 years. He supported the creation of the Young Lion Competitions and brought the Effie to his native country.

More recently, Oller is an angel investor and has supported various ventures. Among them Yoocan in Tel Aviv and Alisto in San José. He is also a tiny partner in Muscle Points.

During his affiliation with Saatchi & Saatchi, he was an evangelist for Lovemarks, due to his belief in the value added by brands that inspire loyalty beyond reason.

== Recognition ==
Award	Category	Year	Country
HK McCann Worldwide Award	Advertising	1984	United States
Cannes Film Festival	Advertising	1989	France
Clio Awards	Advertising	2000	United States
El Ojo de Iberoamérica	Advertising	2003	Argentina
Pregonero de Bronce	Bronze Lion	2011	Costa Rica
Entrepreneur of the year	Finalist	2013	Costa Rica
Effie Awards	Silver Effie	2014	Ecuador
Entrepreneur of the Year	Management	2015	Costa Rica
Volcán Festival	Volcan al Legado	2023	Costa Rica

== Publications ==
Oller has published numerous articles and reflections on the subject on platforms such as La Nación, the Huffington Post and on his personal blog A Fuego Lento.

- El arte del desapego (2025, Spain)
- Winning in the Consumer Revolution Lovemarks Effect participation with a chapter. (2006, United States)
