= Castore =

British multinational sportswear manufacturer

J. Carter Sporting Club Limited
- Trade name: Castore
- Type: Private limited company
- Industry: Textile
- Founded: 6 July 2015; 11 years ago in Bebington, Merseyside England
- Founders: Philip Beahon; Thomas Beahon
- Headquarters: Manchester, England (Note: Between the inception of the business and mid-2021 the company headquarters were located in and around Liverpool.)
- Number of locations: 12 (2024)
- Area served: Worldwide
- Products: Sportswear; Apparel; Footwear; Accessories
- Brands: AMC (Andy Murray Collection); Belstaff; Grenson; Umbro (Europe only)
- Number of employees: 400 (2020)
- Website: castore.com

J. Carter Sporting Club Limited, operating as Castore (/ˈkæstɔːr/, KAS-tor), is an English manufacturer of sportswear and athletic clothing, headquartered in Manchester, England. The company's products are sold worldwide and have sponsorship deals with association football, cricket, rugby union, golf and Formula One teams.

== History ==
The company was founded in 2015 by brothers Thomas and Philip Beahon, when they were 25 and 22 years old respectively. Tom had been a professional youth football player for Tranmere Rovers between the ages of 17 and 21 before spending time at Jerez Industrial in Spain and attending the Glenn Hoddle Academy. Phil played semi-professional cricket for Cheshire and Lancashire cricket clubs.

The pair left their playing careers in 2013 and moved to London to work in finance in an effort to raise money for their sportswear venture; Tom worked at Lloyds Bank and Phil for Deloitte. During their time in London they began their market research by interviewing patrons of high-end gymnasiums and signing up a number of prolific investors from the fashion and sporting industries. Castore launched online in 2016. In 2019 Forbes listed the pair in their "30 Under 30" list.

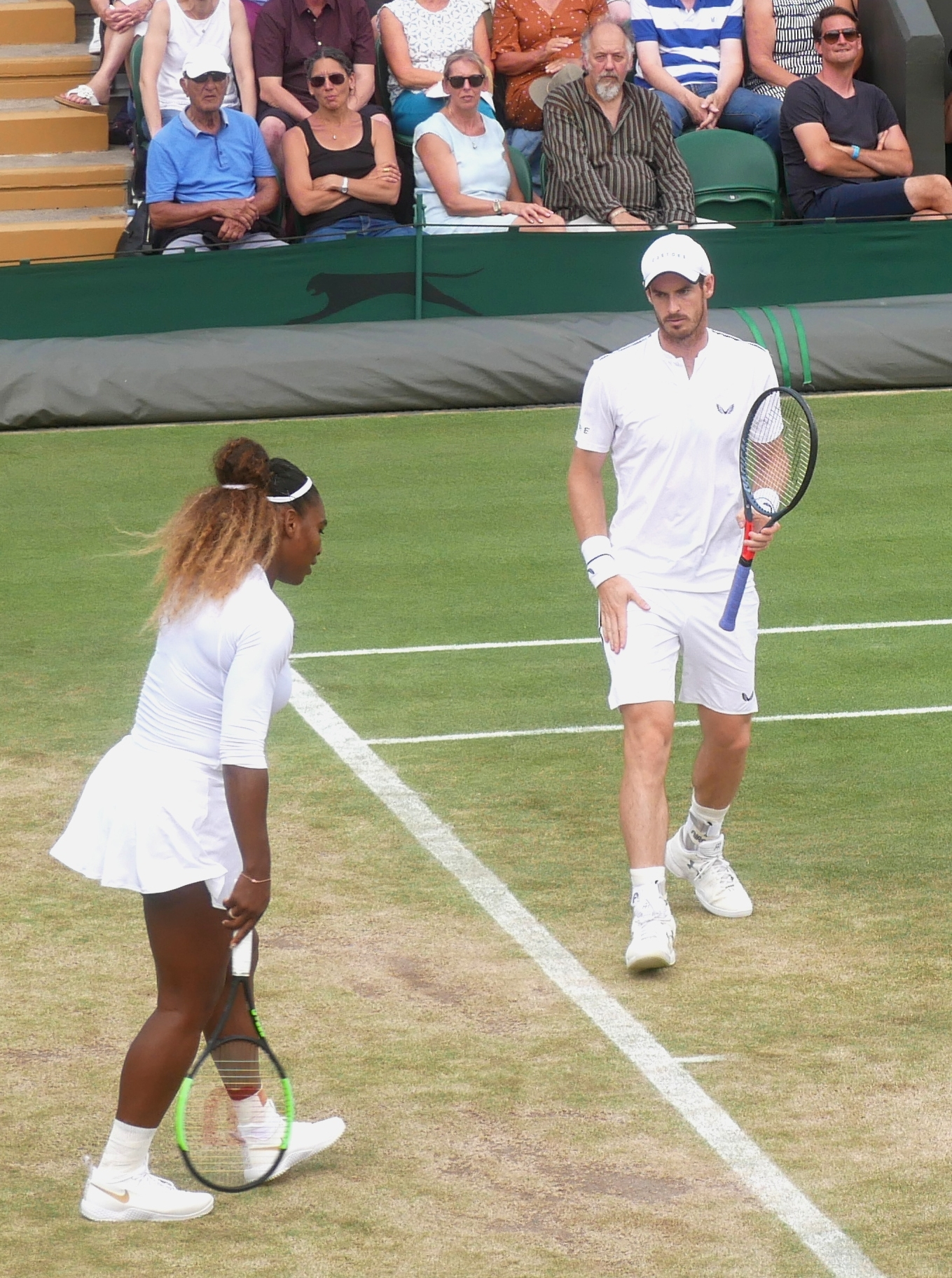
Andy Murray wearing Castore branded items at the 2019 Wimbledon Championships

In January 2019, Castore became the official kit partner to British tennis champion Andy Murray, the first major sportsperson to be sponsored by the company, who also became a shareholder in the company in March of that year. The company brands Murray's products as AMC, and it became the official apparel partner of the Lawn Tennis Association. Marlie Packer, who plays for England's women's rugby union team, is a brand ambassador for Castore.

In early 2020, Castore secured £7.5 million in funds from undisclosed private investors to help the company move into elite professional football. In May 2020, Castore became the official kit supplier of Scottish Premiership club, Rangers on a five-year deal believed to be worth £25 million. Castore went on to sponsor for a wide range of football clubs in Europe ahead of the 2022–23 season, Castore continued its expansion into professional football, announcing new partnerships with Premier League club Aston Villa, English Football League clubs Charlton Athletic, Milton Keynes Dons and Salford City, as well as La Liga club Sevilla, Bundesliga club Bayer Leverkusen and Serie B club Genoa.

On 5 July 2023, it was announced that Castore is to open its first shop in Ireland, on Dublin's Grafton Street. In March 2024, Castore has secured an exclusive deal with GL Dameck to become the sole licensee for Umbro Professional Team Sports, enabling them to distribute the Umbro brand across several key European markets.

On 28 August 2025, Belstaff was sold to Castore as part of a strategic investment by Ineos. Grenson, a hand-made shoemaker established in 1866, was also acquired by Castore in 2026.

== Sponsorships ==
=== Association football ===
In May 2021, Castore signed a multi-year deal with Premier League club Wolverhampton Wanderers to become their new on-field partner. This partnership deviated from previous agreements held by the company, with Castore providing the playing staff with kits, while Wolves manufactured and distributed the replica kits under license. In July 2021, Castore signed a multi-year deal with Premier League club Newcastle United to become their new kit manufacturer.

In March 2023, the FAI announced a 5 year deal for Castore to become the official kit supplier of the Irish men’s and women’s national football teams, being the first national football team Castore sponsored.

Starting in the 2023–24 football season, Feyenoord announced that they will leave Adidas after 9 years for Castore and in April 2023 FC Utrecht and FC Twente also announced to start with Castore for the 2023–2024 season. Glentoran F.C. also announced a partnership with Castore for the 2023–2024 season. GNK Dinamo Zagreb announced to start with Castore for the 2024–2025 season, where in June 2024 Everton F.C. also announced its multi-year deal with Castore starting from the 2024–25 season as kit manufacturers and stadium sponsors at the new Everton Stadium. At the start of the 2025–2026 season, Castore became the kit manufacturers of Middlesbrough FC.

=== Rugby ===
In June 2021, it was announced that rugby union side Saracens had agreed a five-year supply deal with Castore ahead of their return to Premiership Rugby in the 2021–22 season. The deal also included additional partnerships with Saracens' women's team and Saracens Mavericks netball team. Castore went on to sign for other Premiership teams such as Bath, Harlequins and Leicester Tigers.

In 2024, it is also announced that Castore will be the official kit supplier of the Hong Kong national rugby team. England Rugby followed suit to partner with Castore from 2025 onwards.

=== Cricket ===
In December 2019, Cricket West Indies signed a three-year deal with Castore to produce their official kit.

In September 2021, it was announced that the England and Wales Cricket Board had signed a ten-year deal with Castore worth £25 million to become the official kit supplier, starting from April 2022. The same month Cricket South Africa signed a three-year deal with Castore to produce their official kit, although a new technical partner was announced with more than 12 months left on the original deal. In December Kent County Cricket Club announced it would partner with Castore as a technical partner beginning in the 2022 season. In March 2023, Worcestershire CCC announced a multi-season partnership with Castore.

In December 2023, it was announced that New Zealand Cricket had signed a six-year deal with Castore as the outfitter of Blackcaps and White Ferns. They will start with Castore from October 2024.

=== Motorsport ===
In May 2021, McLaren and Castore announced a multi-year deal for them to become the official team apparel and sportswear partner to the McLaren Formula One team.

Ahead of the 2023 season, Red Bull Racing announced that they would be leaving Puma for Castore for the 2023 Formula One season, and MotoGP's Repsol Honda Team announced that they will leave Alpinestars for Castore as the new official team apparel. As of 2026, Castore also supplies team apparel for Alpine and Haas teams in the Formula One curcuit.

=== Other sports ===
Castore produces golf apparel and has been the apparel partner of the LIV Golf team Majesticks GC since 2025. Castore also sponsors the World Snooker Tour and Castore apparel are worn at selected tournaments such as the Snooker Shoot Out.

== Ownership ==
As of August 2021, the company has 33 shareholders with the largest being the two founders, each with 18.59%, and Monte Group (Jersey) LTD (Note: Monte Group is an investment company owned by Mohsin and Zuber Issa of EG Group.) with 15%.

Other shareholders of the company include Redrice Ventures, Robert Senior (former CEO of Saatchi & Saatchi), Tom Singh (founder of New Look), YOOX Net-a-Porter Group investor Arnaud Massenet, Ineos and tennis player Andy Murray.

== Criticism ==
Castore has come under criticism from both fans and teams about the quality and design of its products.

In September 2023, the kit Castore designed for Aston Villa's men's and women's team's received criticism from players due to the shirts soaking sweat, leading to them visibly changing colour, as well as becoming heavy and uncomfortable as a match went on. The Villa women's team were reported to have "dreaded" wearing the shirt because of how it clung to the body as it became wet. As well as requesting a short-term solution, Aston Villa looked to end their contract with Castore early as a result of player complaints regarding the kit.

In December 2023, Castore delivered a new Aston Villa kit which they hoped would resolve the issues, however it was reported that the club still wanted to sever its multi-year contract with the brand. Ultimately, in January 2024, it was revealed that Aston Villa had severed their contract with Castore and opted to move instead to Adidas.
