= Shoba Purushothaman =

Malaysian-born entrepreneur

- Born: Kuala Lumpur, Malaysia
- Education: B.A. in English Literature and Japanese language; M.A. in Economic Communication
- Alma mater: Monash University, American University and Harvard Business School
- Occupation: Entrepreneur
- Known for: Entrepreneurship, Marketing, and Journalism

Shoba Purushothaman is a Malaysian entrepreneur who has co-founded several companies: Bulletin International, The NewsMarket, Training Ventures. She was co-founder and chief executive officer of The NewsMarket, a digital news video platform.

Purushothaman was CEO and President of The NewsMarket until March 2009. Prior to that, she was a partner and director of Bulletin International, an international broadcast PR consultancy that was sold in 2001 to Cordiant Communications Group, now part of WPP, a marketing communications service.

== Early life and education ==
Purushothaman was born and raised in Kuala Lumpur, Malaysia. She attended the Methodist Girls' School. She has a BA in English Literature and Japanese language from Monash University (Melbourne, Australia), and a Master's in Economic Communication from the American University (Washington D.C., US).

In 1986, she was awarded a Journalism Fellowship by the Asia Foundation in the United States. In 2000, she completed the Owner-President Management program at Harvard Business School.

== Career ==
Purushothaman began her career as a journalist with Malaysian Business, a business magazine based in Kuala Lumpur. Upon completing her master's degree, she began working for Dow Jones & Co.; first for the Wall Street Journal and then its related newswires Dow Jones Capital Markets Wire and AP-Dow Jones News Service in Washington D.C., New York and London.

In 1994, after nine years as a journalist, she joined Anthony Hayward at Bulletin International in London as a partner. Between 1995 and 1998, she established Bulletin's Asian operations in Singapore, and grew regional operations in Kuala Lumpur, Melbourne, and Hong Kong. Purushothaman moved to New York in 1998 to establish Bulletin in the U.S The company was sold in early 2001 to Cordiant Communications PLC, a publicly listed marketing services group that was subsequently acquired by WPP Group.

In 2000, with $100,000 start-up capital from an angel investor, Purushothaman and her former Bulletin business partner Anthony Hayward co-founded The NewsMarket in 2000. Purushothaman was chief executive officer and Hayward as chairman of the board. The NewsMarket provided video clips and information via the Internet to news broadcasters. Its technology platform provided web-based delivery of high bandwidth video files in formats that broadcasters could download and edit instantly. This transformed how the marketing industry delivered content to the media, which had previously been via satellite or tape dispatch. In 2005, The NewsMarket provided video clips digitally to over 3000 newsrooms.

While Purushothaman was CEO, the NewsMarket established operations in London, Mumbai, Munich, Ahmedabad, Beijing and San Francisco. Investors included Apax Partners (Alan Patricof), Battery Ventures, Hearst Interactive Media, and Softbank Capital. Through The NewsMarket, major brands including Google, Intel, the IOC, adidas, BMW, and Samsung made announcements and provided video clips and information about new products to the news media. The NewsMarket also served non-profit clients including the UNICEF, Greenpeace and the Gates Foundation as well as government agencies including - NATO, the International Olympic Committee, the National Cancer Institute, the United States State Department, and the National Science Foundation. Purushothaman left The NewsMarket operating team in New York in September 2009 upon the completion of its acquisition of NASDAQ-listed Medialink. The company was subsequently re-branded as Synaptic Digital and was acquired in 2012. Purushothaman served on its Board until its 2012 acquisition.

Since 2012, Purushothaman has worked on entrepreneurial ventures which seek to disrupt the corporate training sector with technology-led learning focused on behavioral skill development. Purushothaman and her co-founder Anthony Hayward are targeting the fact that 66% of the world's labor pool today is in emerging markets. This 2.1B large workforce provides opportunities for skills training that leverages technology to scale.

In 2013, Purushothaman was chosen as one of 15 fellows globally for the inaugural "On the Board" fellow by George Washington University. The fellowship, offered in conjunction with the International Women's Forum, trains women to work on the boards of major corporations.

In 2016, Purushothaman co-founded Hardskills with Anthony Hayward and Krish Menon to translate their early vision of a technology-led solution to training behavioral skills such as critical thinking, problem-solving, communication and decision-making. Hardskills operates out of the twin hubs of Singapore and Berlin. In 2019, Hardskills and Purushothaman were selected to participate in SAP.io's No Boundaries start-up accelerator in Berlin that aims to help business-to-business start-ups to scale. Purushothaman is based in Berlin.

Purushothaman speaks regularly at conferences globally on entrepreneurship, digital media, workforce development, and marketing. She has given guest lectures at Columbia University, the University of North Carolina at Chapel Hill, Stern School of Business, New York University, USC Annenberg School for Communication and Journalism, University of California, Berkeley, and the Indian School of Business in Hyderabad. She has been on the Advisory Board of Columbia University's Strategic Communication program. She was an invited speaker at the 2013 One Globe Conference. She also spoke at the Dell Women Entrepreneurs Forum in 2012 and 2013.

== Awards and honors ==
Purushothaman has received the following awards and honours:

- On-the-Board Fellow (Inaugural program), George Washington University 2013
- ADVANCE (Australia) 50 Global Women Leaders 2011
- Malaysian Indian Global High Achiever (Astro Malaysia) 2010
- Springboard Enterprises (US) North Star award 2008
- Deloitte Technology Fast 50 (NY) 2007
- Ernst & Young Entrepreneur of the Year (NY) finalist 2006
- Asian American Top 50 Business Leader (US) 2005
- Inc. magazine, Entrepreneur of the Year Honorable Mention (US) 2004
- Committee of 200 Emerging Business Leader Protégé (US) 2004
- Center for Foreign Journalists 10th Anniversary Honoree (US) 1995
- Asia Foundation journalism fellowship to the US (awarded to 5 Asians) 1986
