= New Smoking Material =

New Smoking Material was a £7 million product development project run by Imperial Tobacco and Imperial Chemical Industries (ICI) mainly in the 1970s intended to reduce the harmful content of cigarette smoke. Research and commercialisation was done under a joint company New Smoking Materials Ltd (incorporated 1957, dissolved 2012). The term, or its abbreviations N.S.M. or NSM, were also used for products used or intended to be used as a partial replacement for tobacco in cigarettes as a result of this or research by other companies.

The material was modified cellulose (which is a major constituent of tobacco). Three companies produced rival products: in the USA Celanese, brand name Cytrel, in the UK ICI, brand name NSM, and Courtaulds brand name Tabrelle, but only Cytrel and NSM went to market, in July 1977. Four companies produced cigarettes mainly containing 25% new smoking material: Gallaher (which had one product with 40%), Rothmans International, W.D. & H.O. Wills, and John Player & Sons.

The two products Cytrel and NSM were judged less harmful than tobacco and approved by a special government committee, the Independent Scientific Committee on Smoking and Health, which was formed in 1973 and as its first action produced guidelines for the testing of tobacco substitutes and additives. However, there was a public outcry when it was revealed that the research involved animal experiments in which beagles were made to inhale tobacco smoke, or the substitute tobacco smoke, or a mixture of the two, at the equivalent of 30 cigarettes per day for several years.

Sales of the new cigarettes peaked at about 4% of UK sales shortly after launch, but dropped to 0.6% six months later, far below the expectations of Imperial, which had constructed a £15 million factory to produce 15% of the UK market.

Imperial finally closed the factory making NSM in 1981.
