= Paul Arden =

Creative director and writer (1940–2008)

- Born: 7 April 1940
- Died: 2 April 2008 (aged 67)
- Occupations: Author & creative director
- Writing career
- Notable works: Whatever You Think, Think The Opposite; It's Not How Good You Are, It's How Good You Want To Be

Paul Arden (7 April 1940 – 2 April 2008) was a creative director of Saatchi and Saatchi and an author of several books on advertising and motivation, including Whatever You Think, Think The Opposite and It's Not How Good You Are, It's How Good You Want To Be.

== Career ==
In 1987, Arden was appointed Executive Creative Director of Saatchi & Saatchi after having spent 14 years with the agency, handling the accounts of British Airways, Anchor Butter, Toyota, Ryvita, Nivea, Trust House Forte, Alexon Group and Fuji among others. His British Airways ads continue to be remembered as one of their greatest ever advertising campaigns, changing the fortunes of the airline.

Some of Arden's achievements include the following: British Airways becoming "The World's Favourite Airline", The Independent becoming the new intelligentsia's favourite newspaper, Margaret Thatcher the nation's favourite leader and Silk Cut their favourite fag."

"Tempestuous advertising director who thought up memorable campaigns for Silk Cut, BA and The Independent" Times Online

Arden chose to leave Saatchi & Saatchi in 1992 but remained a key consultant for the agency until 1995.

After leaving Saatchi's, Arden set up, with his daughter-in-law and her brother, the company called Arden, Sutherland-Dodd, beginning a new career as a Director of commercials. He also contributed a regular column to The Independent.

Arden always had a strong interest in photography and in 2003, together with his wife Toni, set up a gallery – Arden & Anstruther - in Lombard Street, Petworth, near their home in West Sussex.

== Published works ==
- It's Not How Good You Are, It's How Good You Want To Be (Phaidon Press, 2003)
- Whatever You Think, Think The Opposite (2006)
- God Explained in a Taxi Ride (2007)

== Death ==
Paul Arden died after suffering a heart attack.

== Quotes ==
- We are all advertising, all of the time. Even the priest, with all his or her fervour, is advertising God.
