= Nil (cigarette) =

German cigarette brand

- Product type: Cigarettes
- Produced by: Gallaher Group, a subsidiary of Japan Tobacco
- Country: German Empire
- Introduced: 1901; 125 years ago
- Discontinued: 2011 (Austria only)
- Markets: Germany, Austria, Czechoslovakia, United States

Nil is a German brand of cigarettes, currently owned and manufactured by Gallaher Group, a subsidiary of Japan Tobacco. Nil is German for Nile.

== History ==
Nil cigarettes were launched in 1901 as so-called oriental cigarettes and have been very popular among artists like Otto Dix. Originally, it was a product of the Austrian Kaiserlich Konigliche Tabac-Regie, now known as "Austria Tabak". In Germany, it is one of the oldest brands that are still on the market. Until the end of the 1920s, Nil contained, like most oriental-type-cigarettes, cannabis (8%). In addition to the classic, filter-less Nil, with the characteristic oval cross-section came in 1957 a filtered version of the cigarette on the market, which was available until 1976.

In addition to the classical, non-filter Nil with a characteristic oval form, in 1957 a version of this cigarette with filter was introduced, which was available until 1976. Since 1998, the brand has been positioned in a new way by Austria Tabak, and strongly promoted again. In addition to the reintroduced filter-cigarette, a light-brand and rolling-tobacco were introduced. The recovered filter cigarette was soon followed by a light brand and a fine-cut tobacco. The production of the classic, unfiltered Nil from pure oriental tobacco was discontinued at the turn of the year 2003/2004 due to the introduction of new restrictions on tar and nicotine values in the European Union. At the beginning of 2011, the expiry of the NIL brand was announced in Austria. In Germany, Nil is still available.

The logo of the NIL cigarettes consists of a blue rectangle, in which the lettering NIL in white capital letters is set, surmounted by a white eagle, with the word REGIE between them, referring to the former tobacco company.

== Limited edition packs ==
For its 100th anniversary in 2001, a special edition of the brand with black and white photos of Austrian and German artists appeared on the backs of the box. These included Otto Sander, Fiona Bennett, Ugo Dossi, Steffen Wink, siblings Pfister and Peter Patzak.

In the summer of 2007, there was the so-called NIL home edition. Based on the cigarette name Nile, five major rivers were selected and replaced by the distinctive Nil logo. The following rivers were selected: Danube, Elbe, Isar, Rhine and Spree.

In 2016, JTI put out a special edition version of their Nil brand, mocking the problems that the Berlin Brandenburg Airport had after it was announced that the opening of the new airport would be delayed until 2020, which consist of a series of delays and cost overruns due to poor construction planning, execution, management, and corruption. The words "BER" and "Under Construction" were written on it. The logo of the brand also contains the coordinates of the airport.

== See also ==
- Tobacco smoking
