= Kevin Roberts (businessman) =

British businessman (born 1949)

Kevin Roberts CNZM
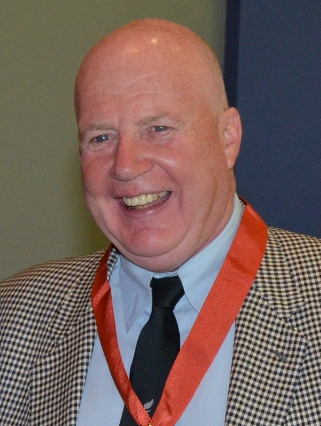
- Roberts in 2014
- Born: 20 October 1949 (age 76); Lancaster, England
- Education: Lancaster Royal Grammar School
- Occupation: Businessman
- Title: Chairman, Red Rose Consulting

Kevin John Roberts CNZM (born 1949) is a British businessman. He was the chief executive officer (CEO) of the advertising agency Saatchi & Saatchi from 1997 to 2014. In September 2006, Saatchi & Saatchi won a US$430 million JC Penney contract because of the idea of lovemarks, which was invented and promoted by Roberts. Roberts became executive chairman of Saatchi & Saatchi in 2015, then non-executive chairman in 2016. He resigned in August 2016 to focus on the marketing and leadership consultancy he founded in 1995, Red Rose Consulting.

== Early life and career (1949–86) ==
Roberts was born and raised in Lancaster in the northwest of England. He was educated at Lancaster Royal Grammar School in the 1960s. He then became an assistant brand manager for Mary Quant Cosmetics in 1969. Roberts was later promoted to a brand manager.

From 1969 to 1986, Roberts worked as international new products manager at Gillette, then group marketing manager at Procter & Gamble (P&G), then regional vice president at Pepsi Cola, Middle East in 1982.

== Executive career (1987–96) ==
In 1987, Roberts was appointed to the first "chief" role in his career, as president and CEO of Pepsi Cola, Canada. While at Pepsi Canada, Roberts executed a publicity stunt after a keynote speech to a group of Pepsi Canada employees, bottlers, and the media. Roberts had a Coke vending machine rolled onto the stage while he was speaking. As he finished his speech, he reached down, picked up a machine gun, and blasted the Coke machine. "[Roberts] meticulously planned the spectacle, borrowing a gun from a squad of police officers and rigging the vending machine so that he had to fire only one blank to set off a dazzling rat-a-tat-tat."

From 1989 to 1997, Roberts was director and chief operating officer (COO) of alcoholic drinks company Lion Nathan, based in New Zealand.

== CEO of Saatchi & Saatchi (1997–2016) ==
In 1997, Roberts was appointed to the role of CEO of Saatchi & Saatchi. In 1997, Saatchi & Saatchi was in "deep trouble, with morale at an all-time low." Roberts was advised to restructure the business drastically by bringing in his own people and moving current people around. Instead, Roberts brought in and moved nobody for two years.

In September 2006, Saatchi & Saatchi won a US$430 million JC Penney contract because of the idea of lovemarks, invented and promoted by Roberts.

In the 2013 Queen's Birthday Honours, Roberts was appointed a Companion of the New Zealand Order of Merit, for services to business and the community.

On 30 July 2016, Roberts was placed on leave by Publicis Groupe, after an interview with Business Insider in the wake of controversial comments about gender diversity in the advertising business, stating that "the fucking debate is all over. This is a diverse world, we are in a world where we need, like we’ve never needed before, integration, collaboration, connectivity, and creativity" and judging that women lacked ambition for top leadership roles.

"It is for the gravity of these statements that Kevin Roberts has been asked to take a leave of absence from Publicis Groupe effective immediately", stated Groupe Chief Executive Maurice Lévy. Roberts resigned from his position on 3 August, with effect from 1 September 2016.

== Consultant and coach (2016–present) ==
Since leaving Publicis Groupe in 2016, Roberts' main role has been counselling and coaching business leaders and employees on leadership, marketing and creative thinking through his company Red Rose Consulting, founded in 1995, clients include Fremantle, AIA, Sogrape, Coordinate Advertising, and Transmed MEA.

Roberts was chairman of My Food Bag (2015–2019) and chairman of cricket company CricHQ (2016–2018) which is based in New Zealand.

Roberts was chairman of Beattie (2017–2019), the creative communications group.

In 2017 Roberts became an independent director of the UK grocery chain Booths and chairman of English lakes-based company Herdy.

== Publications ==
- Peak Performance – Lessons for Business from the World's Leading Sports Organisations, 2000, by Clive Gilson, Mike Pratt, Kevin Roberts, and Ed Weymes (ISBN 1-58799-150-0)
- Lovemarks: The Future Beyond Brands, 2004
- Sisomo: The Future on Screen, 2005 (ISBN 1-57687-268-8)
- Lovemarks: The Future Beyond Brands (Expanded Edition), 2006, (ISBN 1-57687-270-X)
- The Lovemarks Effect: Winning in the Consumer Revolution, 2006, (ISBN 1-57687-267-X)
- Diesel: XXX Years of Diesel Communication, 2008, (ISBN 0-84783-166-3)
- 64 Shots: Leadership in a Crazy World, 2016, (ISBN 978-1576877715)

== Positions ==
- CEO in Residence at RYSE Asset Management (2022–present)
- Expert in Residence at Oxford University’s The Foundry (2017–present)
- Honorary doctorates: University of Waikato (1998), International University in Geneva (2009), Lancaster University (2009)
- Honorary professorships: Universidad Peruana de Ciencias Aplicadas (2008), University of Auckland (2008), Lancaster University (2009), University of Victoria B.C. (2015)
- Professorships: University of Waikato (2003-2007)
- Inaugural CEO in Residence at Cambridge Judge Business School (2001-2009)
