= Senior Service (cigarette) =

British filterless cigarette brand

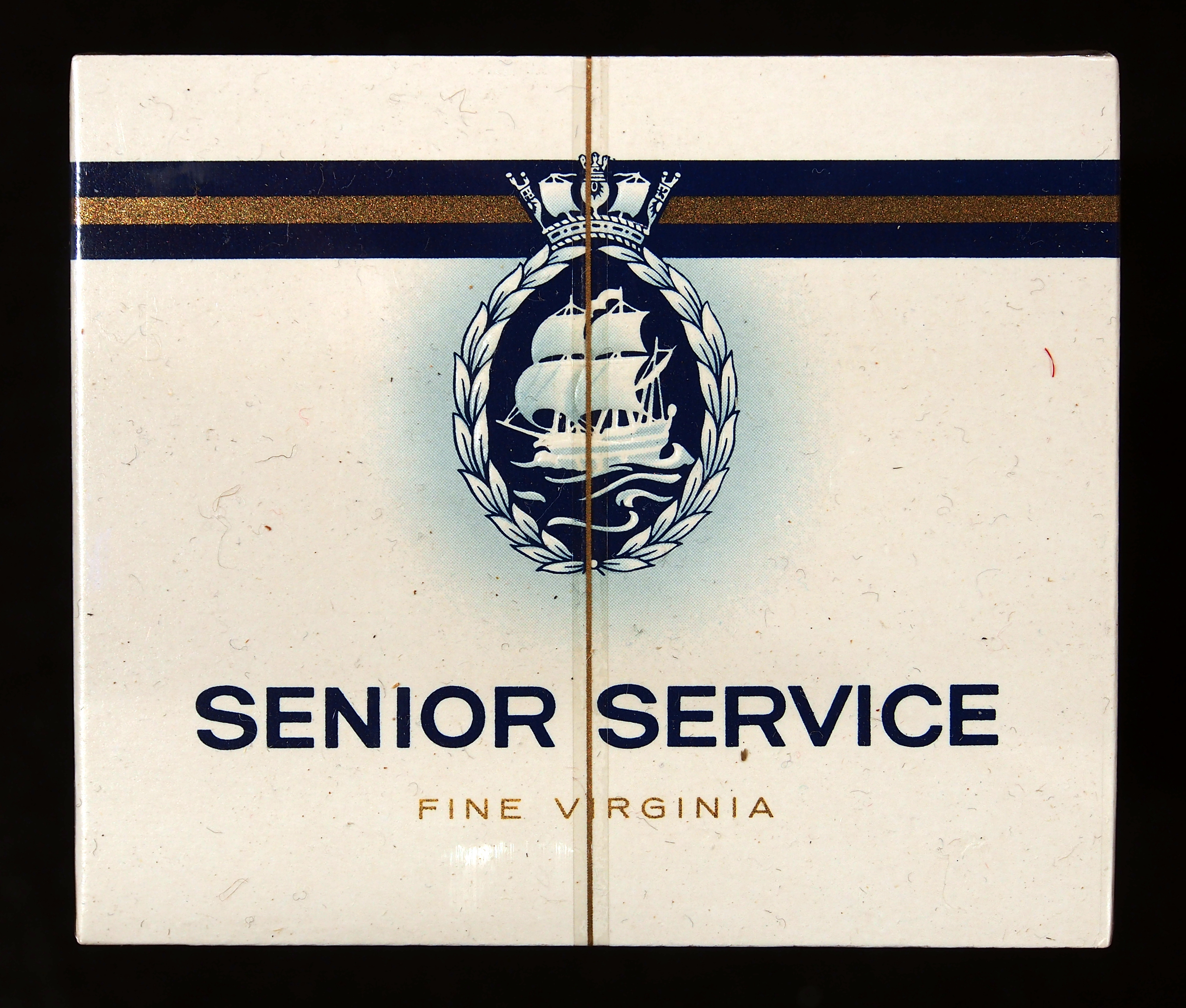
- An old pack of Senior Service cigarettes
- Product type: Cigarette
- Current owner: Gallaher Group, a subsidiary of Japan Tobacco
- Country: United Kingdom
- Introduced: 1925; 101 years ago
- Discontinued: 2020; 6 years ago
- Markets: See Markets
- Previous owners: J.A. Pattreiouex Ltd
- Tagline: "Senior Service Satisfy"

Senior Service was a British brand of filterless cigarettes, owned and manufactured by Gallaher Group, a subsidiary of Japan Tobacco. The brand was named after the nickname of the Royal Navy.

Senior Service was sold mainly in the United Kingdom, and also in Belgium, The Netherlands, Germany, Italy, Greece, Cyprus and South Africa.

After a long period of decline, as filtered cigarettes came to dominate a declining UK market, they were discontinued by the manufacturer in the UK from January 2020.

== History ==
Senior Service was launched in 1925 by "J.A. Pattreiouex Ltd", a company that was acquired by Gallaher in 1937. Senior Service is no longer available in the United Kingdom, and was one of the most expensive brands available for purchase. One of the most popular slogans used with the brand was "Senior Service Satisfy".

In 1938, J. A. Pattreioux Ltd. issued a 48-card set of "Flying" cigarette trading photo cards that were issued with Senior Service cigarettes. The cards measure 3.05 × 2.05 inches (77.47 × 52.07 mm), and were assigned the London Cigarette Card Company Catalog reference number H.564-3B. The fronts of the 1938 "Flying" cards featured glossy black-and-white photos surrounded by a thin white margin. The card title was located in a rectangular white box centered at the bottom of the image area. The photo cards were presented in both landscape(horizontal) and portrait (vertical) formats. The backs of the cards, printed with black ink, featured two rectangular boxes surrounded by a common rectangular box. The top box featured four vertical segments: (1) the name of the set "FLYING" with two opposing airplane icons; (2) the series length and card number; (3) the card title; and (4) descriptive text. The lower box displayed the products name "Senior Service cigarettes". Various poster advertisements were made to promote Senior Service cigarettes as well.

In 1999, the Senior Service cigarette factory that produced the Senior Service cigarettes on Ashton Road, Hyde, Greater Manchester was closed down and later demolished in 2011. It had opened in 1905, and manufactured cigarettes until 1999, when production was moved to Northern Ireland

== Packaging ==
The pack is white, with an orange-blue stripe at the top. The new pack removed the orange and instead put two seagulls on either side of the pack. The brand's emblem is a sailing ship, with on the side two olive tree branches and on top a crown. Underneath is written "Senior Service" with underneath that the words "The perfection of Cigarette Luxury". The old packs had the words "Fine Virginia" written instead. On the reverse side of the original packaging, the words "A Product of the Master Mind." were written.

== In popular culture ==
Cigarette vending machine with the tagline "Senior Service Satisfy" at Midland Railway Centre.

James Bond smokes Senior Service cigarettes in Ian Fleming's novels, Goldfinger, Thunderball, The Spy Who Loved Me, and The Man with the Golden Gun.

It has appeared at 28' on Aki Kaurismaki's film I Hired a Contract Killer (1990).

Senior Service was mentioned by Polly Shelby in Peaky Blinders, Series 3 Episode 4.

They are mentioned in the film The Bank Job.

Patricia Routledge, playing the mundane monologuer Kitty, first originated on Victoria Wood: As Seen on TV, describes the fictional and unseen producer of the supposed television show as stubbing out her Senior Service when they meet.

Elvis Costello wrote a song titled "Senior Service" in 1979 with many references to smoking a cigarette. Senior Service was reportedly the favourite brand of Costello's producer, Nick Lowe.

Senior Service was mentioned on the Only Fools and Horses episode "The Yellow Peril" as Joan Trotter's brand of cigarette.

Detective Inspector Harris offers a Senior Service cigarette to Melville Farr in the film Victim (1961).

In the movie Mortelle randonnée, Isabelle Adjani smokes Senior Service cigarettes.

The Still Game episode "Aff" from 2004 features pensioner Winston Ingram favouring the brand, declaring "Senior Service, nae arsing aboot wi yer poofy Silkys", referencing to the difference in strength of tobacco between Senior Service and Silk Cut. His 80-a-day habit resulted in his right leg being amputated.

In the novel Zone of Interest, chapter III ("Grey Snow"), the protagonist Angelus Thomsen asks a British inmate if he likes Senior Service cigarettes.

== See also ==
- Tobacco smoking
