= Sterling (cigarette) =

British cigarette brand

- An old English pack of Sterling cigarettes, with a UK text warning at the bottom of the pack.
- Product type: Cigarette
- Produced by: Gallaher Group, a subsidiary of Japan Tobacco
- Country: England
- Introduced: 2006; 20 years ago (Re-launched)
- Markets: See Markets

Sterling is a British brand of cigarettes, currently owned and manufactured by Gallaher Group, a subsidiary of Japan Tobacco in 2007.

== History ==
Sterling had been a fairly popular mid-range brand up to the 1970s but sales dwindled and the brand was eventually discontinued. The brand was officially re-launched in the United Kingdom in 2006. According to data from AC Nielsen, Sterling has a 44% share in the cheap brand tobacco sector and has retail sales of an excess of £261 million. They are available in four different colors, red, blue (smooth), green (menthol) and a blue-green gradient (click-on menthol "Fresh Taste"). Sterling Dual cigarettes are also available in Super king size. In 2018, a double capsule cigarette was introduced as Sterling Double Capsule, available in king size.

Some advertising posters were made for Sterling cigarettes.

In 2020, Sterling Dual New launched without the capsule, due to the ban on menthol cigarettes in the UK.

== Markets ==
Sterling is mainly sold in the United Kingdom, but also was or still is sold in The Netherlands, Cyprus, Spain, Australia, New Zealand, Papua New Guinea and the United States.

== See also ==
- Tobacco smoking
