= Mayfair (cigarette) =

Cigarette brand

- An old UK pack of Mayfair cigarettes, with a UK text warning at the bottom of the pack.
- Product type: Cigarette
- Produced by: Gallaher Group, a subsidiary of Japan Tobacco
- Country: United Kingdom
- Introduced: 1992; 34 years ago
- Markets: See Markets

Mayfair is a brand of cigarettes, currently owned and manufactured by Japan Tobacco.

== History ==
Mayfair cigarettes were launched in 1992 in the United Kingdom.

By 2007, Mayfair had become the second-most popular cigarette brand in the UK, with total sales of £663 million.

In 2012, for the brand's 20th anniversary, Japan Tobacco International produced a limited-edition pack.

== Markets ==
Mayfair cigarettes are mainly sold in the United Kingdom and Ireland, but also in Austria, Portugal, Spain, Italy, Poland, Greece, Australia, and Canada.

== Products ==
The brand is available in seven versions: Mayfair White King Size, Mayfair Original Blue King Size and Superkings, and Mayfair Sky Blue King Size and Superkings. Mayfair also made a menthol cigarette called Mayfair Green, sold in King Size and Superkings, until it was discontinued in May 2020 due to the EU menthol ban. After the menthol ban, Mayfair introduced a new cigarette, Mayfair New Green, a non-menthol alternative.

== See also ==
- Tobacco smoking
- Health effects of tobacco
