= Saatchi & Saatchi =

British multinational communications and advertising agency network

Saatchi and Saatchi
- Type: Private
- Traded as: LSE: SS (until 2000) NYSE: SS (until 2000)
- Industry: Advertising
- Founded: 1970; 56 years ago London, England, U.K.
- Founders: Maurice Saatchi; Charles Saatchi
- Headquarters: London, England, U.K.
- Key people: Claire Hollands (CEO); Franki Goodwin (Chief Creative Officer); Sam Wise (Chief Strategy Officer)
- Parent: Publicis Groupe (2000–date)
- Website: www.saatchi.co.uk

Saatchi and Saatchi is a British multinational communications and advertising agency network with 114 offices in 76 countries and more than 6,500 staff. It was founded in 1970 and is currently headquartered in London. The parent company of the agency group was known as Saatchi and Saatchi PLC from 1976 to 1994, was listed on the New York Stock Exchange and London Stock Exchange until 2000 and, for a time, was a constituent of the FTSE 100 Index. In 2000, the group was acquired by the Publicis Groupe. In 2005, the group went private.

== History ==
=== Early years (1970–1975) ===
Saatchi & Saatchi was founded in London by brothers Maurice (now Lord Saatchi) and Charles Saatchi in 1970. Following stints starting as a copywriter at the New York City offices of Benton & Bowles in 1965, then at Collett Dickenson Pearce and John Collins & Partners, Charles Saatchi teamed up with art director Ross Cramer, and the genesis of what would become Saatchi & Saatchi was born in London in 1967 as the creative consultancy CramerSaatchi. The consultancy took on employees John Hegarty and Jeremy Sinclair and began to work direct for clients. It was Sinclair's "Pregnant Man" ad for the Health Education Council which first attracted attention to the small agency. Charles's younger brother Maurice joined the business in 1970 after Cramer's departure whereupon it was renamed "Saatchi and Saatchi" and developed into a full-service advertising agency.

As a creative consultancy they had worked primarily on projects for agencies but having become a full service agency they were able to quickly build their own solid client base and, by 1975, this included blue-chip clients such as Associated Newspapers, British Leyland, Brutus Jeans, Cunard, Dunlop, National Magazines, and Nestle. They also worked for the Labour Party.

It was during these early years that the agency produced its first famous ad: the Pregnant Man for the UK's Health Education Council featuring a man who appeared to be pregnant.

In 1975, the Saatchi brothers set upon a ferocious course of business acquisitions. With the reverse takeover of the Garland Compton agency in 1975, they achieved a public company listing and were thereafter able to make rights issues to raise the capital required for their acquisition drive.

Garland Compton were a long established, conservative British agency, founded by Sidney Garland in 1927. In 1960, the US agency, Compton Advertising, bought a minority holding so that they could build their own international network, primarily to service their largest client, Procter & Gamble. Garland Compton was also a top 10 agency with big spending clients including Bass, British Caledonian, Gillette, New Zealand Dairy Board, Procter & Gamble, Schweppes and United Biscuits. They had also established a regional network of agencies and, of course, had access to the global Compton network. With the merger, the key management positions were taken by Saatchi people.

With the merger, Saatchi & Saatchi moved into Garland Compton's offices on 80 Charlotte Street in the west end of London; and the agency now found itself in the UK Top 5 agencies for size of billings.

=== Saatchi & Saatchi Garland Compton (1975–1988) ===
The 13-year tenure of Saatchi was characterized by a consistent output of creative work and a focused approach toward increasing its international market presence.

Noted work included their campaign "Labour Isn't Working" on behalf of the Conservative Party before the 1979 UK general election and ongoing campaigns for British Airways, and Silk Cut with whom the agency had long relationships. The agency was seen as producing breakthrough creative work with a bold attitude and employed people who went on to be stars of their industry including Sir John Hegarty, Lord Tim Bell and Sir Martin Sorrell.

The acquisition drive was less about removing competition than about adding to their offering of professional marketing services beyond advertising, and later included an international expansion drive – particularly into the United States. Between 1972 and 1987, more than 35 marketing services businesses were acquired, including four significant ad agency networks. Those acquisitions are listed below:

Year	Company	Location	Business	Price
1972	Brogan Developers	UK	Property Development	
1972	E.G Dawes	Manchester, UK	Advert Agency	
1972	Notley Advertising	London, UK	Advert Agency	
1974	George J Smith	London, UK	Advert Agency	£390K
1976	Garland-Compton	UK	Ad Agency	(Merger)
1978	Hall Advertising	Edinburgh, UK	Ad Agency	£1.9M
1979	O'Kennedy-Brindley,	Dublin, Ireland	Ad Agency	£309K
1981	Garrott Dorland Crawford	UK	Ad Agency	£7.84M
1982	Compton Advertising Inc	US	Ad Agency	£56.8M
1983	McCaffrey & McCall	US	Ad Agency	£27M
1983	Hunter Advertising	Dublin, Ireland		
1983	Gough Waterhouse	Sydney, Australia	Ad Agency	
1984	Cochrane, Chase, Livingstone	California, US		
1984	Michael Bungey DFS			
1984	R.J.A	Netherlands		
1984	Harrison Crowley	UK		
1984	Yankelovich Skelly & White	US	Market Research	
1984	McBer & Co	US	Market Research	
1984	The Hay Group	Worldwide	Management Consultancy	$100M
1984	Hedger Mitchell Stark	London, UK	Ad Agency	£3.9M
1985	Siegel & Gale	New York, US	Corporate Branding	
1985	Marlboro Marketing	New York, US	Sales Promotion	
1985	The Kleid Company	New York, US	Mailing List Broker	
1985	Wong Lam	Hong Kong		
1985	Hayhurst	Canada		
1985	Campaign	New Zealand		
1985	Sharps	UK		
1985	Granfield Rork Collins	London, UK		£109M
1985	Humphreys Bull & Barker	London, UK	Ad Agency	
1985	The Rowland Company,	New York, US	Public Relations	$10.8M + earnout
1985	Infocom Group		I.T Consulting	US$31M
1985	Clancy Shulman Associates	US		
1985	Kingsway Public Relations	UK		
1986	Dancer Fitzgerald Sample	Worldwide	Ad Agency network	US$75M
1986	Backer & Spielvogel	US	Ad Agency network	US$101M
1986	Ted Bates	US and Asia	Ad Agency network	US$500M
1986	Peterson & Co	US	Trial litigation advisers	US$123M
1986	Campbell Mithun	Minnesota, US	Ad Agency	
1987	Cleveland Consulting Assoc	US	Management Consultants	
1988	Gartner Group	Connecticut, US	I.T Market Research	US$77.4

Scarcely any of the growth of the Saatchi & Saatchi PLC was organic with the only start-ups being The Sales Promotion Agency in 1980 and Financial Dynamics PR in 1986. Whilst their foundation London office was consistently successful in winning new clients, it too was propelled forward in the 1976 merger with the UK operation of the larger Garland-Compton business resulting in its tripling of size and a relocation into the Compton premises. Goldman quotes executives of acquired entities including David McCall (McCaffrey & McCall) and Alan Siegel (Siegel+Gale) saying that they never met Charles Saatchi and that neither brother nor other group management had any involvement in their business after acquisition. There was no drive to achieve back-office economies, no systemisation of process/administration, and no cross-referrals of inter-group business.

=== Financial mechanisms ===
At its foundation in 1970, Saatchi & Saatchi was financed with £100,000 of capital from the brothers and some backers including the designer Mary Quant and her husband. The initial shareholding was 15% Cannon Holdings (Quant & friends); 42% Charles; 38% Maurice; 2.5% John Hegarty; 2.5% Tim Bell. The company was profitable in its first year. To achieve the first large merger (Garland Compton in 1975) the brothers sold their interest in their business for shares, receiving 36% of the enlarged group, while Compton U.S.A owned 26% and 38% was held by public shareholders. The Compton UK listed status meant that the Saatchi & Saatchi business could now issue stock, and the capital for the subsequent acquisitions was raised by giving existing shareholders the first rights to purchase new stock at a discount.

Commonly, the acquisitions used a part cash up-front/ part earn-out mechanism as perfected by Martin Sorrell. The 1982 acquisition of Compton's U.S. business, for instance outlaid $29.2 million in cash and another $27.6 million to be paid over ten years if the agency achieved after-tax profits of $4.07 million. The rights issue to raise the $29.2 million watered down the brothers' holding to 18% of the combined group.

From June 1988 (see next section), the company began to use redeemable preference shares to raise capital. These securities look like equity and were classified as such on the company's balance sheet but since a failure of the company's share price to rise above a pre-determined threshold at a nominated forward date would enable the preference holders to put their stock back to the company, these instruments were in truth more like interest-paying debt.

=== Difficulties and decline ===
Difficulties arose after the 1987 Bates acquisition as some clients perceived conflict concerns with other group agencies. Bates clients Warner-Lambert (billings $68 million), RJR Nabisco (billings $96 million), Michelob (billings $38 million), Ralston (billings $12 million) and McDonald's (billings $8 million) all pulled their accounts in the months following that acquisition. Colgate-Palmolive assignments were also pulled from Bates at the same time as their direct competitor Procter & Gamble were pulling business from Saatchi & Saatchi Compton and DFS Dorland due to their conflict concerns. However the London ad agency was still the number one in the profits in the UK in 1987 and the Worldwide Group was performing financially with Saatchi & Saatchi Company PLC recording its seventeenth year of consecutive growth with profits of £124.1M up from m 1986's £70.1M. The Group expanded its public listings to include the Paris Bourse and the New York Stock Exchange.

The brothers in 1987 made their boldest move to date when they made plans for a take over run of the ailing Midland Bank, Britain's fourth largest bank at the time with 2,100 UK branches. The bank's Board rejected the offer in September 1987, openly questioned the qualifications of the Saatchis to be running a bank and may have leaked details of the bid to the press. In the same month Maurice Saatchi met with board executives of the Hill Samuel merchant bank to discuss an acquisition. Once the financial press became aware of the moves the brothers became the subject of unprecedented ridicule with the criticisms focused on the notion that bank customers, staff and shareholders would be able to make no sense of their bank being part of an ad agency group. The City's reaction was swift and in mid-September 1987 the Saatchi & Saatchi share price fell 6.2% in two days.

On 19 October 1987, the world stockmarkets crashed. Saatchi & Saatchi stock fell by 1/3 in twenty-four hours and by mid-October was at £5.48 down from £6.70 in mid-September and £7.05 high of 1987. As a result of the perceptions lingering after the Midland Bank discussions, on top of the general nervousness that followed the crash, by 1988 Saatchi & Saatchi Plc was unable to use its previously reliable rights issue method to raise the capital it needed to continue its acquisition drive.

In June 1988, the company issued £176.5 million of convertible preference shares at £4.41 each to fund its acquisition of the Gartner Group, an information technology market research firm. If Saatchi PLC shares did not go above £4.41 by July 1993, the holders could put the shares back to the company at £4.41 plus a 25% bonus. Saatchi & Saatchi PLC stood to owe £211 million for the £176.5 million of capital raised.

Profits were up by 11% in 1988 to £138 million but in 1989 the Group had to report its first ever decline after eighteen years of growth when the profit dropped dramatically to £21.8 million. When this was forewarned at the March 1989 annual general meeting the share price dropped promptly by £0.6 to £3.20 or 16%. Between January and May 1989, 6% of the workforce or 800 employees were laid off, by the end of 1993 that number had grown to 7,000.

In June 1989, Saatchi & Saatchi announced its intention to sell off its entire consulting division and to focus on advertising and related services. Later that year Robert Louis-Dreyfus was appointed as CEO of the listed company. He effected the sale of a number of businesses (the consultancies Infocom and Hay Consulting collectively sold for half their initial purchase price) and presided over a major restructuring of the company until his departure in mid-1992. His successor was Charles Scott, who had joined the business with Louis-Dreyfus in 1989 as Finance Director. He continued the cost-cutting and consolidation drive but found himself in regular disagreement with Maurice Saatchi and the two executives sometimes conducted their spat via press leaks and stories which found their way into the papers.

=== Ousting the Saatchis ===
David Herro, a U.S.-based investment analyst and fund manager, managed a 9.6% holding in Saatchi & Saatchi for his employer Harris Associates L.P.. He maintained dialogue with his former employer, the State of Wisconsin Investment Board, which had built up an 8.1% holding during Herro's time there and with colleagues at the General Electric Capital Corporation, which held 5%. Herro became concerned in 1992 at the negative effect on the investment of the public bickering between Scott and Maurice Saatchi and made this view known to the board along with his intention to monitor the business closely.

In late 1994, Herro expressed his view (and that of his associate shareholders) to the board of Saatchi & Saatchi PLC that Maurice should be dismissed as chairman due to his tardiness in reducing costs by maintaining expensive corporate offices at Berkeley Square for too long, Maurice's expressed intention to perhaps launch a takeover or partial takeover, and his insistence on a new incentive/option plan which Herro saw as structured to Maurice's favour. In December 1994, the board succumbed to shareholder pressure and sacked Maurice as chairman. Within a month senior executives Jeremy Sinclair, Bill Muirhead, David Kershaw, Moray McLennan, Nick Hurrell, Simon Dicketts, and James Lowther all also resigned and joined Maurice Saatchi in a new business, M&C Saatchi. Charles Saatchi, other Saatchi staff and some consequential clients followed including Gallaher Group, Mirror Newspapers, Dixons and British Airways.

=== After the brothers ===
The ousting of the Saatchi brothers in 1995 and the subsequent formation of M&C Saatchi saw a period of turmoil for the agency, as key figureheads from the London office joined the defection to the new entity. At this point, nearly £40 million of revenue left the agency, with a further £11 million spent on severance and litigation against the staff members who left.

In 1995, Saatchi & Saatchi PLC was renamed the Cordiant Communications Group and the subsidiary businesses split into two main groupings: Research and Advertising. The Saatchi & Saatchi Advertising network formed the keystone of the latter. At this time, Bob Seelert was brought in as CEO to stabilize the company, and the acquisition frenzy that characterised the agency throughout the 1980s was taken to task under the new management system. This led to a number of agency assets being sold, including the Fitch design company (to the WPP group), management consultants The Hay Group and a number of the other 383 offices around the world that had been acquired in the 1980s.

After the 1995 shakeout, the key imperative for the new owners was to manage the relationships with Saatchi & Saatchi's blue-chip client base, which at this point included decades-old partnerships with the Campbell Soup Company, Hewlett-Packard, Johnson & Johnson, Procter & Gamble, DuPont, Philip Morris and General Mills. The strength of these relationship were the legacy of the earlier acquisitions of Compton, of Bates Worldwide and of Dancer Fitzgerald Sample whose relationship with Procter & Gamble had stood since the 1920s. While the British Airways and Mars defections in 1995 destabilised the agency's reputation in London, it seemed not to affect operations in its biggest market, the United States. The growth of its new healthcare arm in New York City and increased spending from its West Coast auto clients Toyota and Lexus enabled a period of steady growth for its American operations.

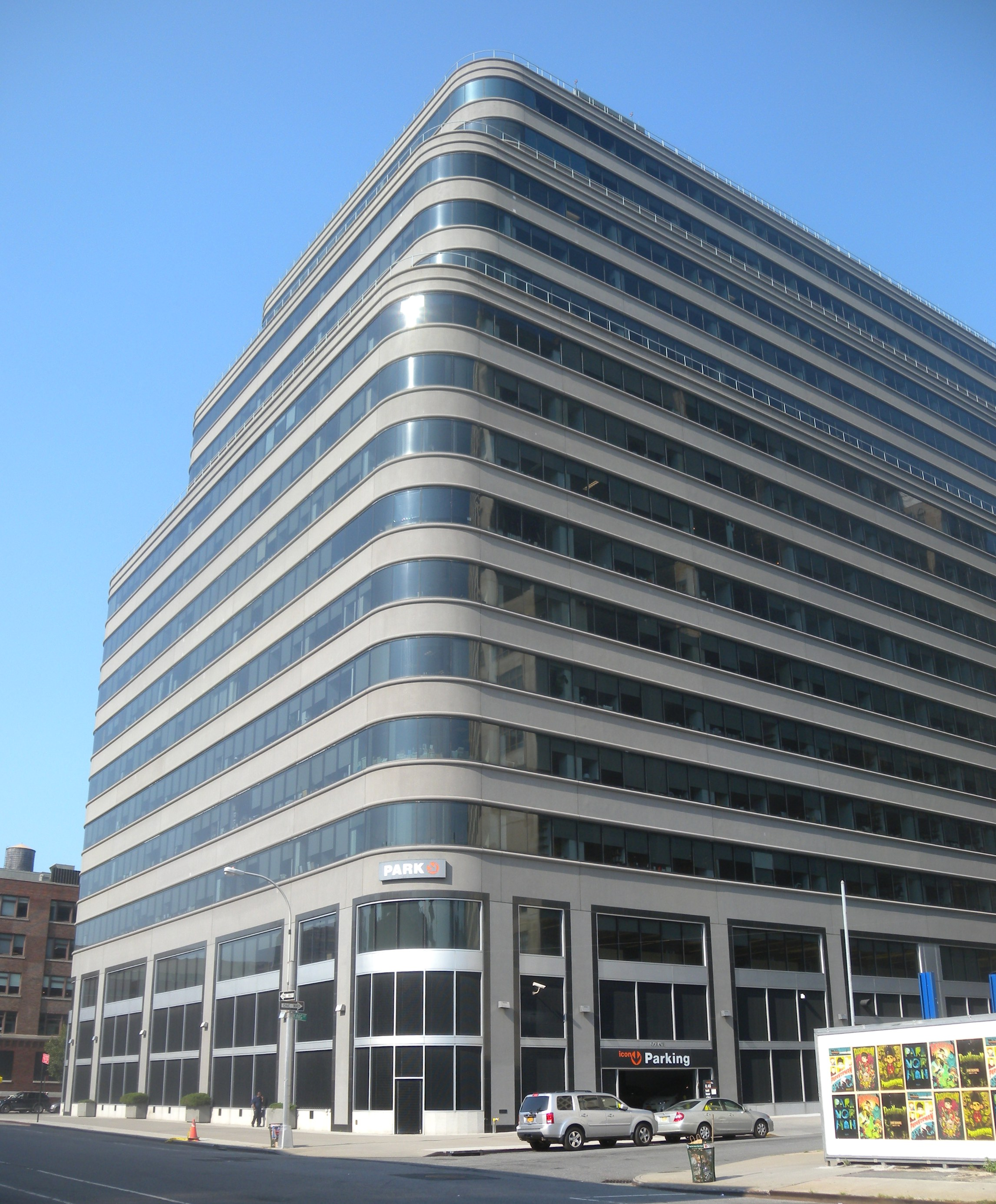
Hudson Street building

In 1997, Seelert transitioned into the role of Chairman, and Kevin Roberts became CEO. Saatchi & Saatchi officially dropped "Advertising" from its name. This was part of an imperative installed by Roberts, a beverage marketing veteran brought in to continue the revival of the agency's fortunes. A significant decision of his was to move the global headquarters of the agency from its Charlotte Street, London address to its Hudson St, New York City office. Newly dubbed an "ideas company" by Roberts, the agency sought to usher its resources towards the internet, still very much in its infancy in 1997.

=== Acquisition by Publicis Groupe (2000) ===
In 2000, after speculation that it would be acquired by WPP or Omnicom, Saatchi & Saatchi is bought by Publicis Groupe, a global marketing concern based in Paris, France. Publicis kept Roberts as CEO, content with his vision for an "ideas agency". Saatchi & Saatchi still underwent some turmoil throughout this time, as the dot-com bubble saw the closure of its San Francisco office, which effectively ended its 15-year relationship with the Hewlett-Packard company. The account was subsequently split between a Publicis agency and creative agency Goodby, Silverstein and Partners. Johnson & Johnson also decided to review its relationship, withdrawing its $US100m Tylenol account from the New York office. A few months later, InBev announced that its Beck's Beer account would shift to Leo Burnett after only a year at the agency. As a result, Roberts committed to building revenue through its existing clients, which led to additional assignments, with Saatchi Los Angeles securing new accounts such as Pur Filtered Water and Millstone Gourmet Coffee. Efforts were also made to shore up the Los Angeles office after it missed a $US40 million brief for Toyota's Scion, a new sub-brand targeted at youth, which was given to San Francisco-based Attik, a hybrid creative agency.

Despite these losses, this strategy gave rise to the Lovemarks philosophy – a theory espoused in a book by the same name released by Roberts. While this was met with scepticism in the advertising world, Roberts was vindicated in 2006 when he secured nearly $US700 million worth of billings from two clients, Wendy's and department store JCPenney. Subsequent additions to the New York office, such as the New York Tourism Board and Cold Stone Creamery have been described by both client and agency as 'being due to a strong belief in the Lovemarks' philosophy. Despite this, after only a year with the agency, Wendy's decided to pull the majority of its business into another roster agency, Kirshenbaum Bond & Partners, after complaints from Wendy Thomas (the namesake of the restaurant) who did not take kindly to her likeness being used in the advertising.

In 2005, critics complained that in creating a £20 million campaign for a new Brazilian spirit the agency spray-painted graffiti images on walls and buildings in the East End of London.

Dr Martens CEO David Suddens decided to fire Saatchi & Saatchi as their advertiser on 24 May 2007. This was because of a one-time advertisement that used a picture of the 1990s music icon Kurt Cobain without the permission of Courtney Love, Cobain's widow. In its defence, Saatchi released a statement indicating their regret of Dr Marten's decision to terminate their services with them but emphasising that they believed that the advertisement was deliberately edgy but not offensive.

Although the agency had gained early fame for its "Labour isn't working" advertising for the Conservative Party in 1979, in 2007 it was appointed the advertising agency for the Labour Party. The agency then devised the Not Flash, Just Gordon advertising campaign for the party in anticipation of the calling a snap general election by the newly installed Prime Minister, Gordon Brown.

=== A New Alliance ===
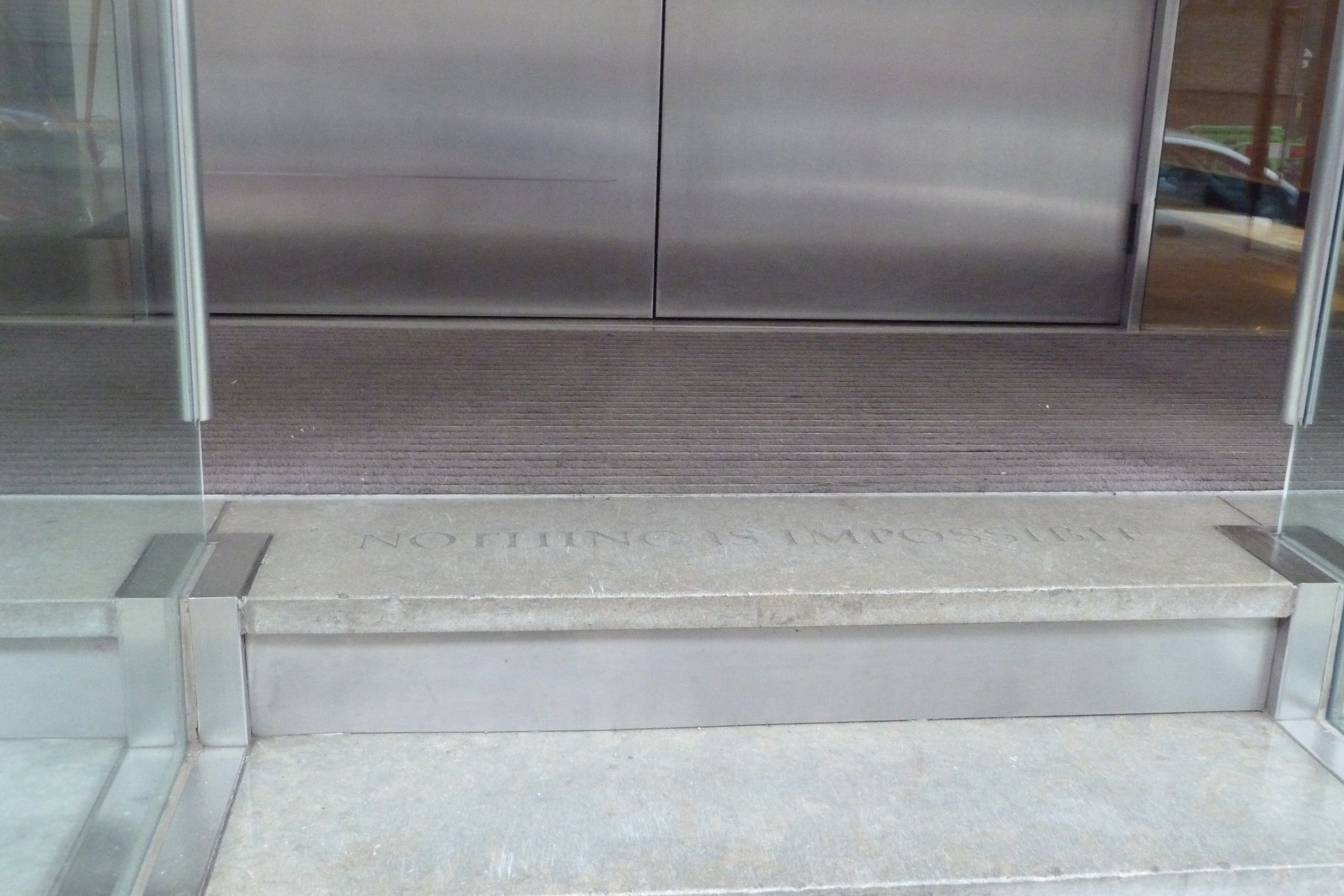
The words 'Nothing is Impossible' on the floor of the entrance to Saatchi & Saatchi's previous London office 80 Charlotte Street.

While the addition of Wendy's and JCPenney to the American client roster reaffirmed Roberts' belief in the "ideas agency" model, the London office continued its slide as it plummeted out of the UK Top 10 list of agencies (a list, compiled by industry magazine Campaign UK, based on reported client billings). In early 2007, the London office saw the bulk of its work for Toyota UK and Europe leave to upstart agency CHI & Partners, just months after it had lost the entire Lexus business to the same agency. Late 2006 saw the return of some Toyota business, including the £60m pan-European launch of the Auris, Toyota's Corolla successor.

In July 2007, it was announced by Publicis chief Maurice Levy that Saatchi & Saatchi would form a new business alliance with sister agency Fallon. Fallon, part-owned by Publicis, has enjoyed similar mixed success with its network of offices. While its London office, with a client list that includes Sony, Orange and Asda, has been consistently lauded for its new business and creative success, its Minneapolis headquarters, where namesake founder Pat Fallon remains a presence, has been tarnished by a number of client losses, including Citigroup, BMW, Sony, Dyson and Starbucks.

The new alliance, known as Saatchi & Saatchi-Fallon (SSF Group), will operate under the supervision of Kevin Roberts, who was named as CEO of the new entity. Reporting to him is Robert Senior, one of the original partners of Fallon London, who will preside over the Europe & UK operations of the alliance, including both Saatchi and Fallon offices in London.

After a year of operations, it was announced in October 2008 that the SSF Group had been contracted by chocolate giant Cadbury to handle its Dairy Milk and related brands across several markets (including the UK, Europe, Russia, Canada and the United States), with a reported total of $US200 million in billings. Whilst Fallon London would lead creative efforts across Europe, Saatchi's New York office was handed the brief to handle the business in the United States, where Cadbury remains a relative unknown compared to its main competitor, Hershey.

=== Saatchi & Saatchi Fallon Group (2007–2017) ===
Over time, the agency had lost some of its pre-eminent position in the UK and elsewhere. In 2016, for example, the UK agency was sitting at Number 12 in Campaign Magazine table of agency billings.

In 2017, the global CEO Kevin Roberts left the agency after a controversy around comments that he made regarding women's equality in the advertising industry. He was replaced by Robert Senior.

By the end of 2017, the alliance broke up as Fallon was "realigned" into another Publicis Groupe communications agency, Leo Burnett.

=== Saatchi & Saatchi rebuilds (2017–present) ===
Robert Senior stepped down as worldwide CEO in January 2017, and Publicis gave Magnus Djaba, who had led Saatchi & Saatchi London since 2011, the newly created post of global president; Djaba kept the London role. He ran the network with Kate Stanners, worldwide chief creative officer and chairwoman, and David Hackworthy, worldwide chief strategy officer.

In 2017, Saatchi & Saatchi London moved out of 80 Charlotte Street, its headquarters for more than fifty years. They set up a new purpose-built Publicis Communications campus and Saatchi & Saatchi global headquarters at 40 Chancery Lane, London.

Following in the tradition of the staff-only pub, the company created a new onsite joint venture, again named "The Pregnant Man", which is open to the public.

In 2021 Djaba became global chief client officer of Publicis Groupe and gave up the global president role, after which local Saatchi offices reported to their country's Publicis Groupe CEO. Stanners stayed on as chairwoman and global chief creative officer until 2025. In September that year Edelman announced she would join it as chief creative officer, international, after more than two decades at Saatchi & Saatchi.

Sam Hawkey, the London agency's chief operating officer, succeeded Djaba as London CEO in July 2020. He left for AMV BBDO the following year and was replaced by Chris Kay, previously CEO of Asia Pacific at 72andSunny. In 2022 Kay promoted Franki Goodwin to chief creative officer, completing a senior team with chief strategy officer Richard Huntington, managing director Sarah Jenkins and chief production officer Jess Ringshall. In May 2023 the John Lewis Partnership appointed Saatchi & Saatchi as lead creative agency for John Lewis, Waitrose and John Lewis Finance, including the John Lewis Christmas advert. It replaced Adam&EveDDB, which had held the John Lewis account since 2009, after the partnership's first creative pitch for John Lewis in 14 years.

Kay returned to Australia in 2023. His successor, James Denton-Clark, came from Accenture Song, where he had run Karmarama, and started in July 2023. In February 2024 the agency made Jenkins chief operating officer and Jonathan Tapper, who had joined in 2020, managing director. Denton-Clark stepped down that June.

In November 2024 the agency named Claire Hollands, CEO of MullenLowe, as its CEO, reporting to Charlie Rudd, CEO of Publicis Groupe UK's creative practice. Hollands spent 13 years at AMV BBDO, rising to chief client officer, before joining MullenLowe in 2021, where she merged MullenLowe London, MullenLowe Profero and MullenLowe Salt into one agency. She started at Saatchi & Saatchi in March 2025. Later that year the agency hired Oli Richards as chief growth officer. In September 2025 Huntington left after 18 years as chair and chief strategy officer, and Sam Wise, who had joined as a planning director in 2013, was promoted to CSO.

In December 2025 Aviva appointed Saatchi & Saatchi as its creative agency. The incumbent, adam&eveDDB, had held the account for a decade prior.

As of 2026 the UK leadership team is Hollands (CEO), Goodwin (chief creative officer), Tapper (managing director), Ringshall (chief production officer), Wise (chief strategy officer) and Richards (chief growth officer).

== Operations ==
=== Corporate ===
Saatchi & Saatchi has offices in more than 80 countries around the world. Its worldwide headquarters are in New York City. Its other main office, in the United States, is located in Torrance, California. In the United States, Saatchi's largest clients are Toyota, Procter & Gamble and General Mills.

The London office, the home of the original agency, was originally on Charlotte Street but then relocated to Chancery Lane in 2017. The office has its own pub, named "The Pregnant Man" after the firm's first famous ad.

=== Digital ===
2006 saw the agency focus its digital credentials. As marketers noted the migration of consumers to media such as mobile phones and broadband Internet services, Saatchi responded with initiatives, such as its global joint venture with New Zealand-based Hyperfactory, a global mobile marketing agency. Saatchi’s digital efforts led to awards in 2006 from PricewaterhouseCoopers and Procter & Gamble.

A competition organised by the former Saatchi & Saatchi 2009 interns in London to win an internship at the firm led to the formation of the Secret London Facebook Group, and the associated website.

=== Aborted campaign ===
In August 2011, Telecom New Zealand canceled the "Backing Black" advertising campaign, which called on fans to abstain from sex during the Rugby World Cup and wear black rubber rings to show their support. Telecom's retail boss Alan Gourdie apologised for offending Kiwis. Saatchi & Saatchi, which was responsible for the concept and delivery, refused to comment. Saatchi & Saatchi boss Kevin Roberts earlier defended the ads. Fans were more outspoken, flooding Backing Black's official Facebook site with messages of disgust. Prime Minister John Key said the campaign was evidence not all advertising dollars were well spent.

== Notable alumni ==
=== Bob Isherwood ===
Bob Isherwood joined Saatchi & Saatchi in 1986, where he spent 22 years, including 11 years as the agency’s Worldwide Creative Director, and served as chair of its Worldwide Creative Board. Under his leadership, Saatchi & Saatchi’s global network of 143 offices in 83 countries consistently ranked among the top creative agencies in the world, winning more than 8,000 major awards – including becoming the #1 creative network at the 2002 Cannes Lions Festival – for clients such as P&G and Toyota, for whom Bob served as creative director for the global launch of Toyota Prius.

The Saatchi & Saatchi New Directors Showcase was also under his purview. Along with Richard Meyers, it grew to become the most anticipated premiere at the Cannes Lions Festival, and featured directors such as Spike Jonze, Jonathan Glazer, Ellen von Unwerth, Kinka Usher, Floria Sigismondi, Mark Romanek, Michel Gondry, and Samuel Bayer. 32 years later, the showcase is still one of the highest attended events at the festival.

=== Richard Humphreys ===
Richard Humphreys (1943-2026) was the CEO and Chairman of the agency in the 1980s. He was brought in following the acquisition of Humphreys, Bull and Barker and worked on accounts like Carlsberg, Saab, Castlemaine XXXX. Humphreys started his own advertising agency in 1978 and took it to the top twenty in the UK by the mid-eighties. After selling to Saatchi & Saatchi he was appointed President of Saatchi & Saatchi Advertising Worldwide where he was responsible for 63 companies with more than five thousand staff in 27 countries. After his time at Saatchi & Saatchi Humphreys was co-founder and President of Adcom Investors, owner of a leading US advertising, new media and sports marketing group of companies. He negotiated the sale of Adcom five years later.

=== Tim Bell ===
Tim Bell (1941-2019) was the company's first Media Director appointed in 1976. He performed senior account service roles rising to CEO and later Chairman of the London office. He was instrumental in the agency's strength of relationship with Margaret Thatcher developed during their work on her 1979 and 1983 campaigns. He had a falling out with the brothers in 1985 and left to join Frank Lowe and an offer of his name on the door at Lowe, Howard-Spinke and Bell (now Lowe Worldwide).

=== Andrew Rutherford ===
The agency’s leading copywriter and a Full Board Director who in 1978 created the Labour Isn't Working campaign which was voted the Poster of the Twentieth Century, and is widely credited as being highly influential in Margaret Thatcher’s election victory in 1979. In his six years at Saatchi & Saatchi Rutherford was responsible for a significant proportion of the agency’s award winning campaigns – for The Health Council, Dunlop, Kronenbourg lager, Jaffa, The Evening News and The Conservative Party. He left the agency in 1979 to found the agency Wight Collins Rutherford and Scott (WCRS).

=== Paul Arden ===
Paul Arden (1940–2008) was an Executive Creative Director at the company between 1987 and 1995 working on British Airways, Anchor Butter, Toyota, Ryvita, Nivea, Trust House Forte, Alexon Group and Fuji among others. His British Airways campaigns continue to be remembered as one of the greatest advertising campaigns of all time, changing the fortunes of the airline.

The Independent said that "Arden was the ringmaster behind the whole creative circus that saw British Airways become "The World's Favourite Airline", The Independent become the new intelligentsia's favourite newspaper, Margaret Thatcher the nation's favourite leader and Silk Cut their favourite fag." The Times says he was a "tempestuous advertising director who thought up memorable campaigns for Silk Cut, BA and The Independent". Arden left the employment of Saatchi & Saatchi in 1992, but remained a key consultant for the agency until 1995.

=== Martin Sorrell ===
Sir Martin Sorrell (born 1945), joined Saatchi & Saatchi in 1975 at the time of their reverse takeover of Compton. He was Group Finance Director from 1977 until 1984. He designed and executed the company's significant acquisition drive during that time, refining and using the mechanism of the earn out.

=== Robert Louis-Dreyfus ===
Robert Louis-Dreyfus (1946–2009) was the grandson of Léopold Louis-Dreyfus founder of S.A. Louis-Dreyfus et Cie, once France's largest private firm and one of the world's largest grain trading companies. He met the Saatchis when they were looking to acquire IMS, the U.S. pharmaceutical research company where Louis-Dreyfus was CEO. The business was eventually sold to Dun & Bradstreet and Louis-Dreyfus retired aged 42. He was lured back to corporate life to the role of CEO of Saatchi & Saatchi PLC from 1989 to 1993. He went on to be successful as CEO in a turn-around role at Adidas-Salomon from 1994 to 2001.

== Sources ==
- Fendley, Alison, Saatchi & Saatchi: the Inside Story, Diane Publishing Co., 1995 ISBN 978-0-7567-6563-7
- Kleinman, Philip The Saatchi & Saatchi Story, Pan Publishing (London), 1987 ISBN 0-330-30689-8
- Fallon, Ivan, "The Brothers: The Rise & Rise of Saatchi & Saatchi", Hutchinson, 1988 ISBN 0-091-70890-7
- Goldman, Kevin Conflicting Accounts – The Creation & Crash of the Saatchi & Saatchi Empire, Simon & Schuster, New York, 1997 ISBN 0-684-83553-3
