= Cytrel =

Cellulose-based tobacco substitute

Cytrel is a cellulose-based tobacco substitute used in some low-tar cigarette brands. It formerly constituted 25% of Silk Cut cigarettes and was assessed In the United Kingdom by the Independent Scientific Committee on Smoking and Health (ISCSH) and cleared for marketing in April 1977. On 1 July 1977, Rothmans launched cigarettes containing Cytrel under the brand name Peer.

== History ==
Development began on a replacement for tobacco in cigarettes in the 1950s, to reduce undesirable tobacco smoke components present in cigarettes. Cytrel was developed by Celanese Fiber Marketing Company.

The fiber underwent a challenging development phase, during which scientists faced difficulties in achieving satisfactory smoking characteristics, taste, and manufacturing properties. Despite these challenges, the product proved to be less dense than tobacco and useful as a bulking agent, prompting further development efforts. After undergoing five revisions, the Celanese Fiber Marketing Company finally released Type 308 to the market.

It was used in some Silk Cut variants in the late 1970s and early 1980s such as Silk Cut No 3. and Silk Cut King Size at 25% Cytrel, and Silk Cut Ultra Mild at 40% Cytrel.

In the UK, Rothmans (in a joint venture with Gallaher) undertook toxicological and biological testing of Cytrel in the mid-1970s, including smoke chemistry and animal inhalation studies, alongside clinical trials, following ISCSH testing guidelines.

In a 31 March 1977 UK parliamentary written answer summarizing ISCSH conclusions the government stated that Cytrel had been submitted by a consortium and that the committee had no objections towards the submitted scientific data.

It was one of the NSM (New Smoking Materials) that came into popularity in the 1970s. Cytrel and NSM were both based on modified cellulose.

According to an account in ''The Cigarette Papers'', the 1977 UK launches of tobacco-substitute cigarettes drew criticism from health groups and the Minister for Health.

Overall sales of substitute brands were low and most were withdrawn, with Peer remaining on sale until 1984 as the last of the substitute brands.

Gallaher reported that several Cytrel-containing Silk Cut were withdrawn in 1978 and 1982.Consumers were reluctant to smoke these cigarettes since the Health Education Council advertised against them, the taxes were the same as for normal cigarettes, and the packaging had to have substitute printed on it.
