= Amber Leaf =

Rolling tobacco brand

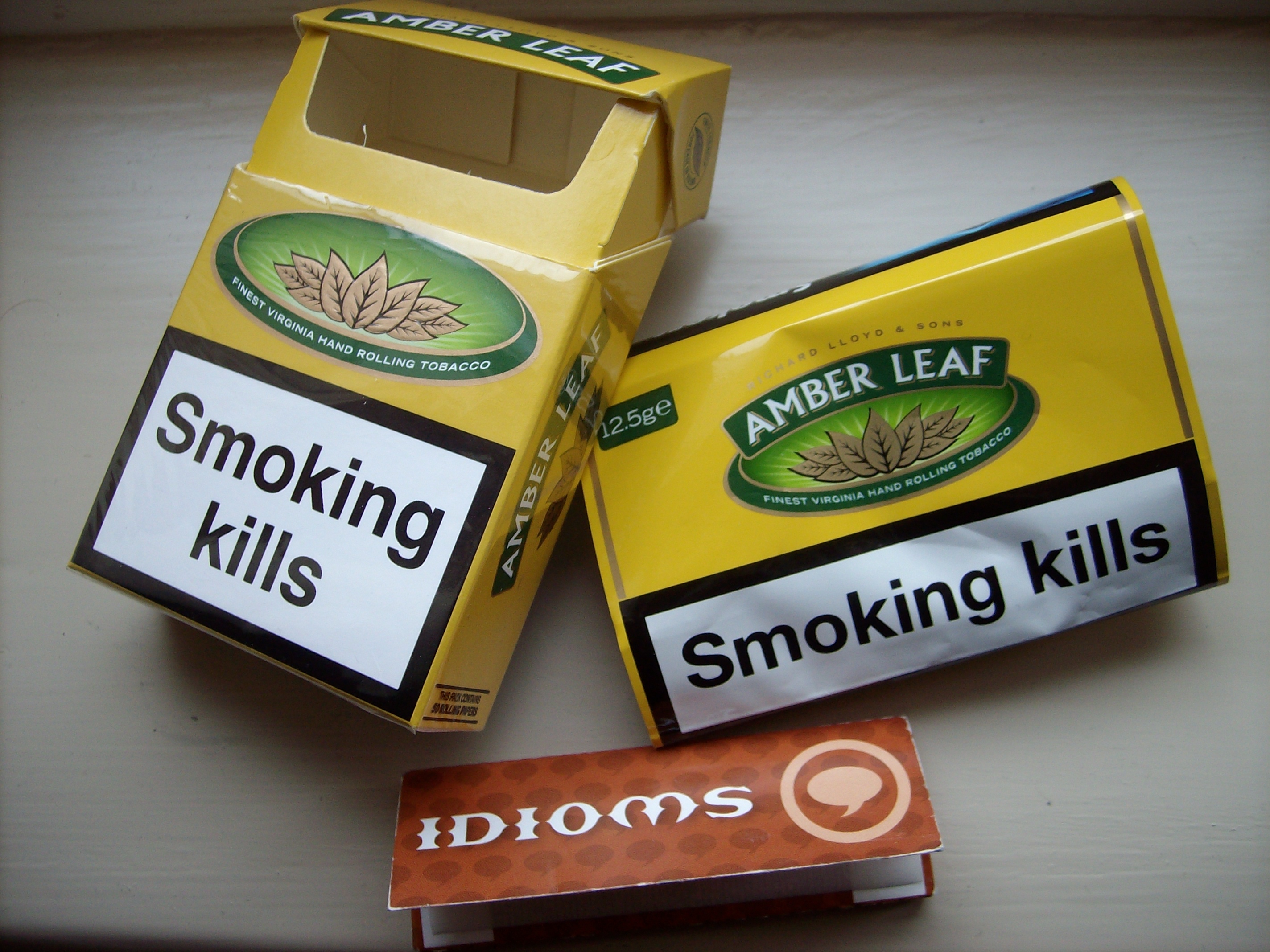
- Box with Papers & Filter Tips 12.5g (small size now outlawed in UK)
- Product type: Rolling tobacco
- Current owner: Gallaher Group

Amber Leaf is a brand of rolling tobacco sold primarily in Europe. It is a product of the Gallaher Group division of Japan Tobacco. As of May 2016, Amber Leaf tobacco is available in 30g boxes which include papers and filters, and 30g and 50g pouches with rolling papers. It is mainly sold in the United Kingdom and Ireland. It is the most popular rolling tobacco brand in the UK (As of November 2025).

== Editions ==
In 2012, Amber Leaf released "Amber Leaf Blonde" in the UK. Amber Leaf Blonde was made to provide adult smokers with a smoother taste by using a premium quality Virginian blend of tobacco. According to the head of JTI's communications, “Unlike traditional RYO tobacco, the blend of which is typically dark. Blonde uses a pale-colored Virginia blend to provide a smooth taste. It’ll not only appeal to existing adult RYO smokers but also the growing number of existing adult dual smokers looking for an RYO product to switch to.”
