= Kensitas Club =

Scottish cigarette brand

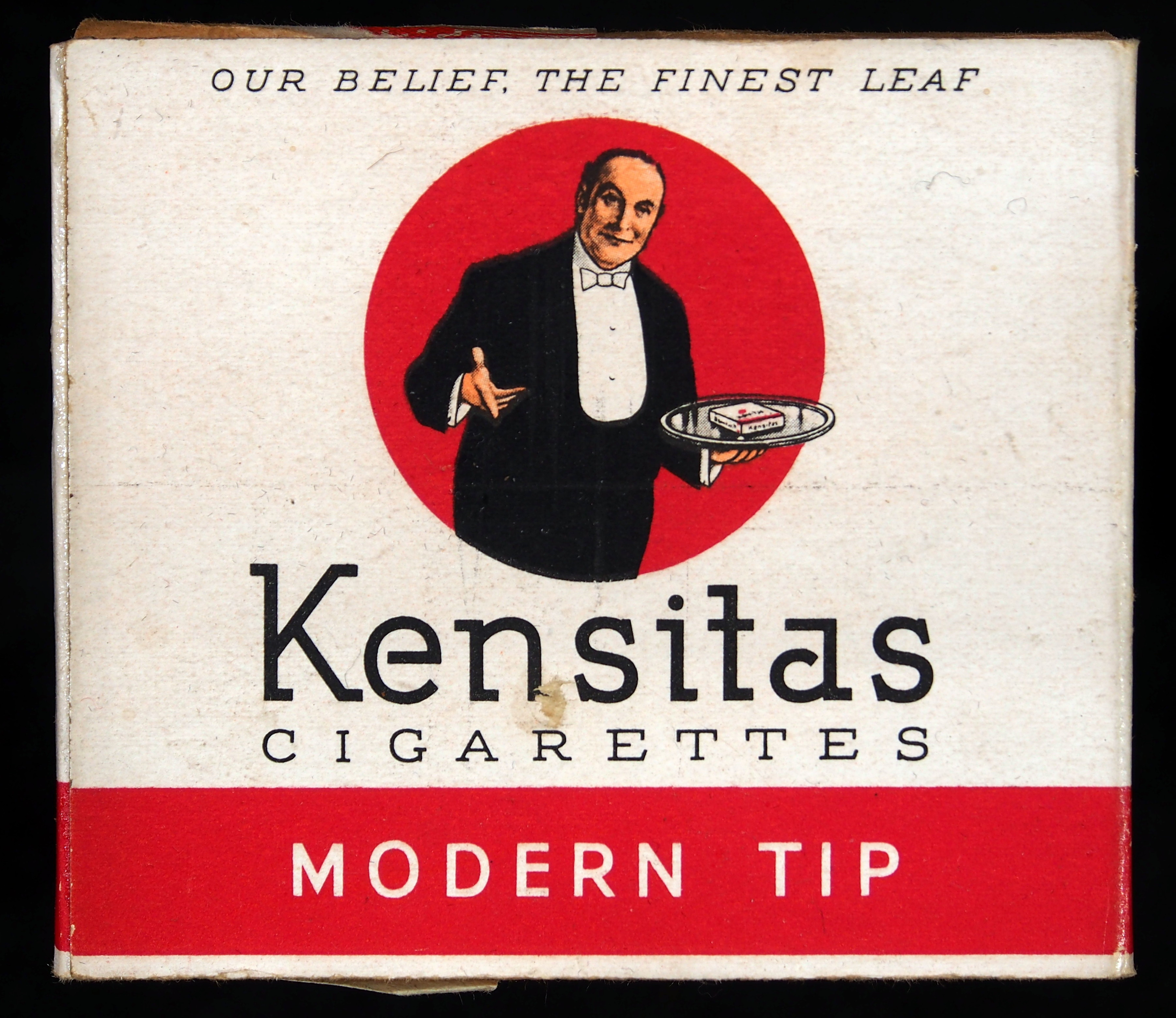
- An old tin pack of Kensitas Club cigarettes
- Product type: Cigarette
- Current owner: Gallaher Group, a subsidiary of Japan Tobacco
- Country: Scotland
- Markets: United Kingdom, France
- Tagline: "Kensitas - that's good!", "Our Belief, the Finest Leaf", "As good as really good cigarettes can be"

Kensitas Club (commonly shortened to Club) is a Scottish brand of cigarettes, currently owned and manufactured by Gallaher Group, a subsidiary of Japan Tobacco. Before May 2017, Club cigarettes in UK came in a distinct blue packet with the Club name and a lion's head.

== History ==
Early packaging and advertising literature featured the Kensitas butler, Jenkyn, always portrayed presenting the cigarettes on a tray. Jenkyn continued to be used by Kensitas in their advertising until the late 1950s. Kensitas claimed that their cigarettes "were made by the Kensitas private process which includes the use of Ultra Violet Rays". Brand slogans included "Kensitas - that's good!", "Our Belief, the Finest Leaf" and "As good as really good cigarettes can be".

Kensitas Club is available in a king size and a super king size variety. No 'light' or menthol substitutes are available. In August 2018, hand-rolling tobacco was added to the product range. Although lights were available at one time, they have been discontinued. The brand built its popularity using gift coupons enclosed within cigarette packets which could be saved and redeemed at Kensitas Gift Centers in major UK cities.

Kensitas Club cigarette packs and tins, from the 1930s onwards, contained various series of cigarette cards. Series included flags of the British Empire, as well as countries in Europe.

Each cigarette has the capacity to produce 10 mg of carbon monoxide, 10 mg of tar and 0.9 mg of nicotine.

== Deceptive advertising ==
In 1932 newspaper advertisements, deceptive copy was used to advertise Kensitas cigarettes by claiming they would "protect the throat" and promising that "1004 British Doctors have stated KENSITAS to be less irritating."

== See also ==
- Tobacco smoking
