= Secret London =

Secret London is a Facebook group started by 21-year-old Bristol University graduate, Tiffany Philippou, on 19 January 2010 in response to a Saatchi & Saatchi competition. The group grew rapidly (180,000 members as of 8 February 2010) and is composed mostly of Londoners who use the site to share suggestions and photos of London. After the group's early success, the founder announced her intention to launch a website of the same name by crowdsourcing the design and development. The website was launched on 16 February 2010.

== Other secret cities ==
Following the initial success of Secret London, a number of other secret groups were independently started around the world, some of which already have over 100,000 users. As of 19 February 2010, the list of other groups includes: Secret Frankfurt, Secret Tel Aviv, Secret Paris, Secret New York, Secret Tokyo, Secret Toronto, Secret Los Angeles, Secret Exeter, Secret Boston, Secret Norwich, Secret Singapore, Secret Brighton, Secret Minneapolis, Secret Sydney, Secret Canberra, Secret Brisbane, Secret Wellington, Secret Christchurch, Secret Madeira, Secret Funchal, Secret Bristol and Secret Cardiff.

== Controversy ==
Some commentators have questioned whether it possible to share secrets without compromising them, and whether sharing tips publicly will lead to over-exposure of the businesses who are recommended.
