= Andrew Gildersleeve Octagonal Building =

Historic house in New York, United States

- U.S. National Register of Historic Places
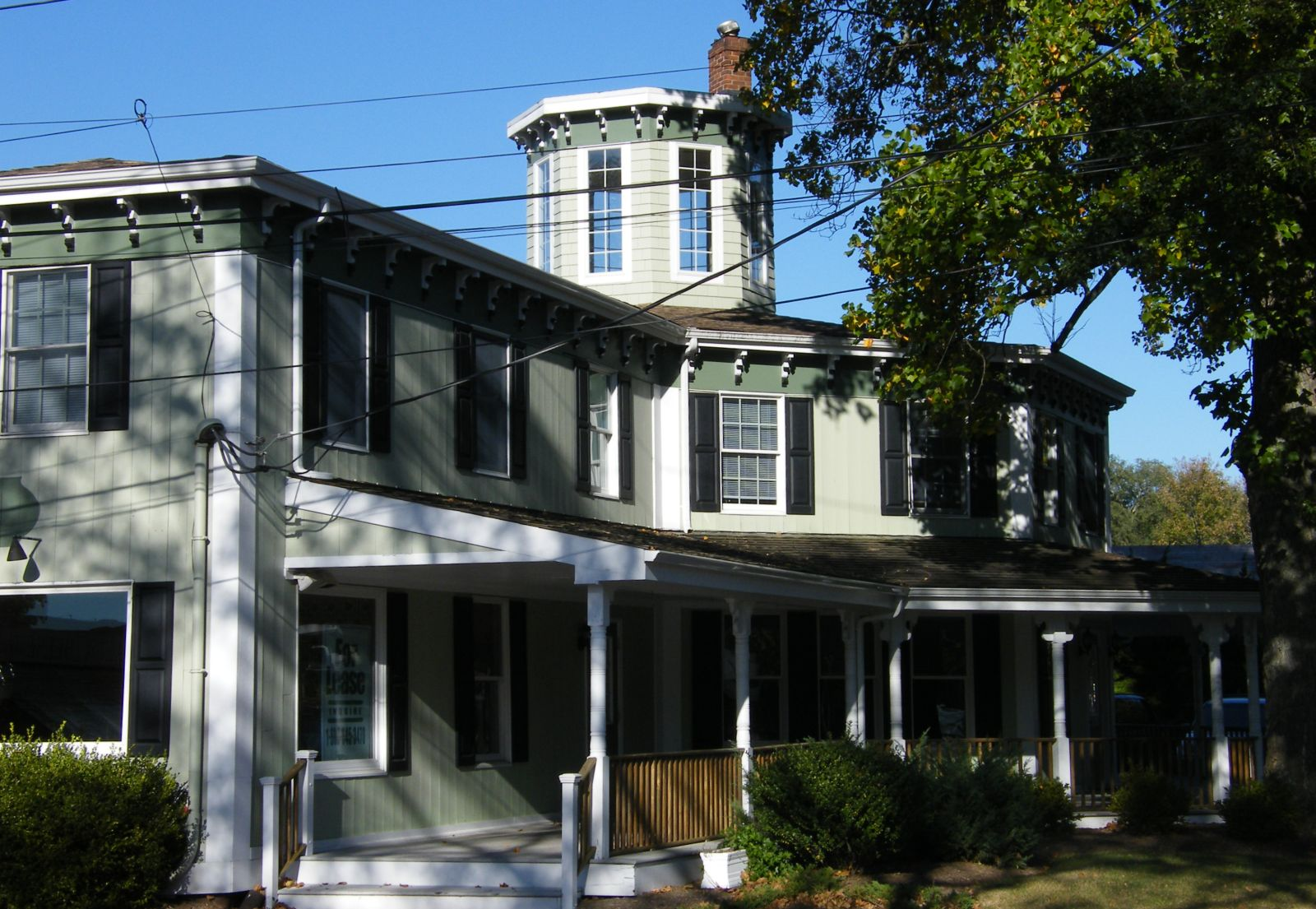

- Location within New York Location within the United States
- Location: Main Road and Love Lane, Mattituck, New York
- Coordinates: 40°59′28″N 72°31′25″W
- Built: 1854
- Architect: Andrew Gildersleeve
- NRHP reference No.: 76001280
- Added to NRHP: August 19, 1976

The Andrew Gildersleeve Octagonal Building, also known as Mattituck, the Octagon House and Mattituck Octagon House, is an historic octagon house located at Main Road (NY 25) and Love Lane in Mattituck, New York. It was built in 1854 by Andrew Gildersleeve, a master carpenter, who used it for his family home as well as for a store.

On August 19, 1976, it was added to the National Register of Historic Places.
