= Robert Senior =

British advertising industry executive

Robert Senior (born 5 December 1964; Middlesbrough, UK.) is the CEO Worldwide of Saatchi & Saatchi, a position he has held since January 2015 and a Partner at Redrice Ventures. Founded in 1970, Saatchi & Saatchi is one of the world’s leading advertising agencies, and part of Publicis Groupe, the world’s third largest communications group.

== Schooling and early career ==
Senior was educated in Frankfurt, the Netherlands, and the UK and is a graduate of Durham University.

Senior began his advertising career at BWBC & Co before moving to D’Arcy Masius Benton & Bowles (DMB&B) for five years (1989–1994) as an account director, predominantly on Procter & Gamble. He then joined Simons Palmer, later to become part of TBWA Worldwide, where he was a client services director from 1994–1998

== Executive career (1998–2014) ==
In 1998, Senior became a founding partner of Fallon London, creating an agency that launched several award-winning campaigns including: “Balls” for Sony Bravia TVs and Skoda "Cake Car". The firm was named Campaign Magazine’s “Agency of the Year”. in 2006 and 2007. In 2007, their “Gorilla” commercial for Cadbury Dairy Milk was awarded Campaign’s “Campaign of the Year,” with the magazine citing the spot’s “impact on both the advertising industry and on the public imagination.” The commercial went on to win the Grand Prix award in film at the Cannes International Advertising Festival.

Fallon London joined Publicis Groupe in 2006. Senior was CEO, London, Saatchi & Saatchi Fallon Group from August 2007 through December 2010. During that time, the agency’s “Life Is For Sharing” T-Mobile campaign spot “Dance,” about a “flash mob” that transformed London’s Liverpool Street Station into a giant dance party, was awarded the TV Commercial of the Year accolade at the British Television Advertising Awards and generated nearly 150 million views on YouTube . From January 2011 through December 2014, he was CEO, EMEA, Saatchi & Saatchi Fallon Group.

On 1 January 2015 Senior became CEO Worldwide of Saatchi & Saatchi and also Chairman of the firm's Worldwide Creative Board. He explained that in his new role he would divide his time between the UK and the U.S. while continuing to be based in London.

== Academic, charitable, and professional affiliations ==
Senior was Chairman of the Marketing Group of Great Britain 2015–2016. He is a regular media commentator on topics including media and the advertising industry and is a contributing blogger at The Huffington Post.

== Personal life ==
Senior, a cyclist and former tri-athlete, qualified as a ski instructor in 1983. He has taught in Austria, Switzerland, and France, and is a partner of an alpine property business in the French Alps. Senior is married with three children.
