= John Gildersleeve =

- Born: July 1944 (age 81)

John Gildersleeve (born July 1944) is a British businessman and the former chairman of British Land until March 2019.

== Early life ==
Gildersleeve was born in July 1944. His father was a sergeant in the Army and his mother was "ambitiously intelligent". He grew up in a rented house in south London, and was the only boy in his year to go to grammar school.

== Career ==
Gildersleeve left school at 18 and joined Shell as a clerk. At 19, he joined Tesco as a trainee manager, having been interviewed by Ian MacLaurin, then an area manager, now Lord MacLaurin. He rose to join the board in 1984 and was a director for 20 years.

He was the chairman of British Land from January 2013 to March 2019. He is deputy chairman of TalkTalk. He was formerly chairman of New Look, EMI Group, Gallaher Group and Carphone Warehouse; deputy chairman of Spire Healthcare; and a non-executive director of Lloyds TSB, Vodafone Group, Dixons Carphone and Tesco.

== Personal life ==
Gildersleeve lives in the UK. He has daughters.
