= Lovemark =

Brand-related marketing concept

Lovemarks: The Future Beyond Brands
- Cover of the first edition
- Author: Kevin Roberts
- Language: English
- Subject: Marketing
- Publisher: powerHouse Books
- Publication date: April 2004
- Publication place: United Kingdom
- Media type: Print
- Pages: 224
- ISBN: 978-1-57687-204-8
- Followed by: The Lovemarks Effect: Winning in the Consumer Revolution (2006)

A lovemark is a marketing concept that is intended to replace the idea of brands. The idea was first widely publicized in the book Lovemarks by Kevin Roberts, CEO of the advertising agency Saatchi & Saatchi. In the book Roberts claims, "Brands are running out of juice". He considers that love is what is needed to rescue brands. Roberts asks, "What builds Loyalty that goes Beyond Reason? What makes a truly great love stand out?" Roberts suggests the following are the key ingredients to create lovemarks:

- Mystery:
  - Great stories: past, present and future; taps into dreams, myths and icons; and inspiration
- Sensuality:
  - Sound, sight, smell, touch, and taste
- Intimacy:
  - Commitment, empathy, and passion

Roberts explains the relationship between lovemarks and other selling concepts through a schema based on respect and love. The full schema is as follows: products (commodities) command neither love nor respect. Fads attract love, but without respect this love is just a passing infatuation. Brands attract respect, even lasting respect, but without love. Lovemarks, explains Roberts, command both respect and love. This is achieved through the trinity of mystery, sensuality, and intimacy.

Kevin Duncan describes the concept in more traditional marketing terms, noting that there are "two axes," one of which runs from low to high respect, and the other which runs from low to high love. For a brand to transcend into "lovemark" territory, it has to be high on both axes at once. Duncan sums up the concept in one sentence: "Creating loyalty beyond reason requires emotional connections that generate the highest levels of love and respect for your brand."

In September 2006, Saatchi & Saatchi won a US$430 million JC Penney contract because of the idea of lovemarks.
