= William Camp Gildersleeve =

Pennsylvanian abolitionist (1795–1871)

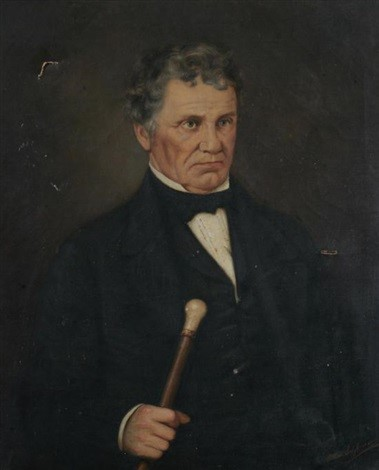
William Camp Gildersleeve

William Camp Gildersleeve (1795–1871) was a merchant and abolitionist whose home in Wilkes-Barre, Pennsylvania was a stop on the Underground Railroad. He won national acclaim from abolitionists for his testimony in front of the U.S. Supreme Court in the 1853 Fugitive Slave case Maxwell v. Righter.

William Camp Gildersleeve was born on 6 December 1795 in Liberty County, Georgia. His parents were Renchie Norman and Rev. Cyrus Gildersleeve, Pastor of the Presbyterian Midway Church in Liberty County, and a cotton plantation owner. It was on the plantation that Gildersleeve said he developed his dislike for slavery. His parents had five other children; Cyrus, Mary, Amarinthia, Sarah, and Hannah. His mother died 15 November 1807. His father remarried on 12 May 1808 to Frances Caroline Wilkinson, who bore him seven more children; Ezra, Caroline, Francenia, Thomas, Isabella, Frances, and Ellen.

Soon after, Rev. Cyrus Gildersleeve gathered his family and moved north, where he became the Pastor of a Wilkes-Barre Presbyterian Church. He purchased a house on Northampton Street in Wilkes-Barre. Another reason he made the move was so that his children could receive a better education.

In 1817, William Camp Gildersleeve married Nancy Spencer Riggs, who was from Mendham, New Jersey. They had a son, Cyrus Norman, in 1819. For a time they lived in Morristown, New Jersey, but moved back to Rev. Cyrus Gildersleeve's house before 1822. From here William Camp Gildersleeve opened a dry goods store on Market Street.

On 25 September 1822, William Camp Gildersleeve and his wife had a daughter, Ann Elizabeth. After she was born, William took his wife, son Cyrus Norman, and the child to a house on the corner of Franklin and Union Street, also in Wilkes-Barre. They had another daughter named Mary on 21 April 1826. Two years later, William Camp Gildersleeve purchased a new house on Franklin Street. In September 1830, his wife Nancy died. His sister, Sarah, came to take care of the children but left when she was married a few months later. After this, William Camp Gildersleeve married Mary Gardiner of Philadelphia. His son died in 1836, at just 17.

By 1837, Gildersleeve had established himself as an opponent to slavery. He managed a stop on the Underground Railroad from his home in Wilkes-Barre, and would then shuttle escaped slaves north to their next stop in either Scranton, Abington, or Montrose. His efforts were aided by Lucy Washburn and Jacob Welcome, two fugitive slaves that he employed. During this year, he invited a prominent abolitionist to come and give a speech against slavery. The speaker had previously been turned away by churches and politicians. As a result, an angry mob vandalized his home in retaliation.

Two years later he invited another abolitionist to speak, this time a mob paraded him through the streets after either soaking him with black dye or having tarred and feathered him. He survived the incident, although none of the perpetrators were arrested.

William Camp Gildersleeve died in 1871.

Fugitive Slave Case

On 3 September 1853, U.S. Federal Marshal George Wynkoop and his two deputies, John Jenkins and James Crossen came across a fugitive slave named William Thomas. Thomas was working at the Phoenix Hotel in Wilkes-Barre under the name of Bill. The federal officers recognized him and moved to capture Thomas, who attempted to defend himself with a fork and a carving knife. A brawl ensured, and Thomas managed to escape into the Susquehanna River, shouting that he would rather die than be taken back to slavery. The officers threatened to shoot him, but local residents interrupted them. The officers were chased off, and Thomas escaped. He was eventually found in a cornfield by a group of women, who tended his wounds.

The federal officers were prosecuted for "inciting a riot" in the US Supreme Court Case Maxwell v. Righter. William Camp Gildersleeve testified during the trial, where he targeted the Fugitive Slave Act itself and the actions of Judge Grier, who had ruled in favor of the marshals.

Legacy

Gildersleeve's testimony in Maxwell v. Righter earned him national recognition as an abolitionist. The testimony was especially praised in African American newspapers.

In 2004, the Pennsylvania Historical and Museum Commission erected a marker on East Ross Street in Wilkes-Barre, Pennsylvania. It reads as follows:

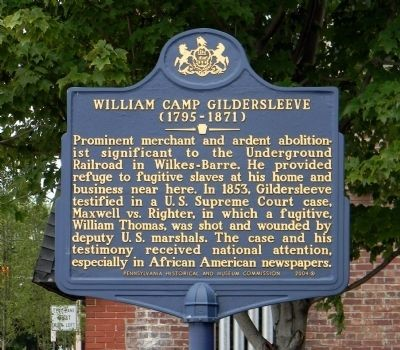
Historical marker for William Camp Gildersleeve in Wilkes-Barre, Pennsylvania

"Prominent merchant and ardent abolitionist significant to the Underground Railroad in Wilkes-Barre. He provided refuge to fugitive slaves at his home and business near here. In 1853, Gildersleeve testified in a U.S. Supreme Court case, Maxwell vs. Righter, in which a fugitive, William Thomas, was shot and wounded by deputy U.S. marshals. The case and his testimony received national attention, especially in African American newspapers."

== Descendants ==
- Thomas H. Atherton
- Charles Henry Atherton
