= Cordiant Communications Group =

Advertising agency conglomerate

- Industry: Advertising
- Founded: 1995; 31 years ago
- Defunct: 2003
- Fate: Acquired by WPP Group

Cordiant Communications Group was an advertising agency conglomerate in business from 1995 to 2003. In 2001, Cordiant was the eighth-largest advertising group worldwide, with an estimated gross income of US$1.2 billion and billings of around US$13.4 billion.

After the Saatchi brothers were ousted from Saatchi & Saatchi, it was renamed Cordiant. In 1997 Cordiant split into two: Cordiant Communications Group and Saatchi & Saatchi (latter absorbed by Publicis Groupe in 2000). WPP Group purchased and absorbed Cordiant in 2003.
