= Silk Cut =

British brand of cigarettes

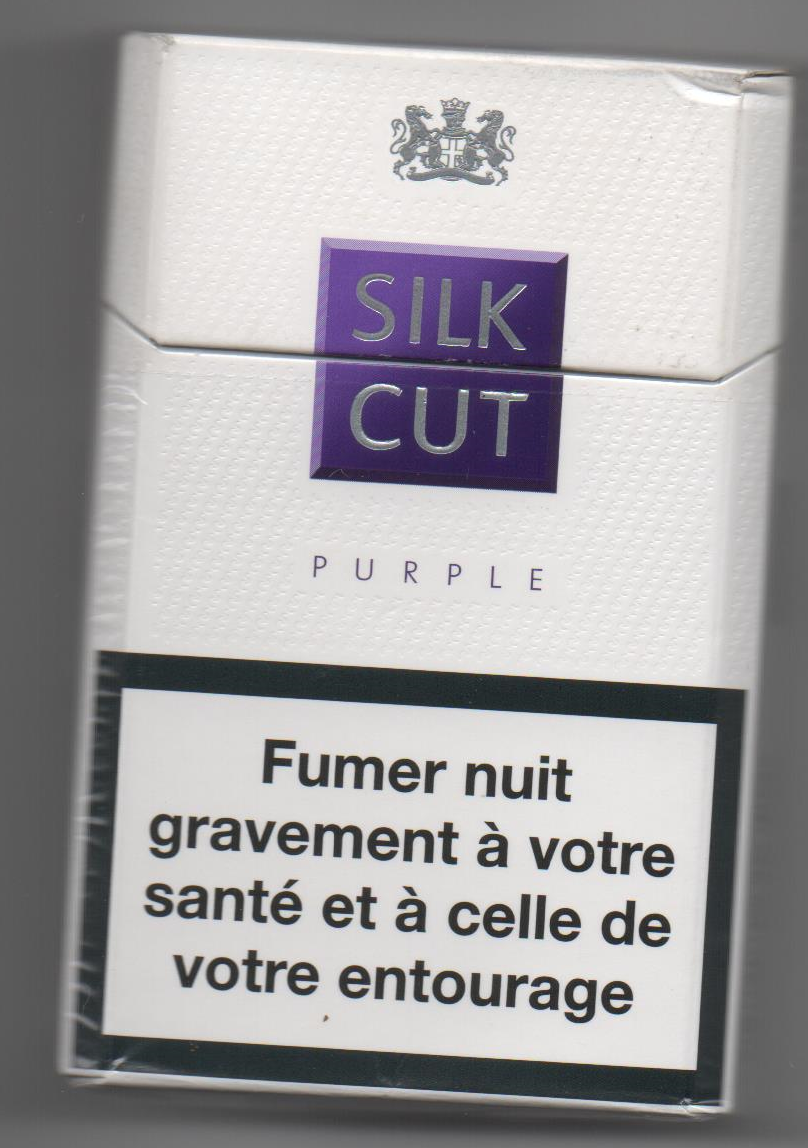
- An old French pack of Silk Cut cigarettes, with a French text warning at the bottom of the pack.
- Product type: Cigarette
- Current owner: Gallaher Group
- Introduced: 1964; 62 years ago
- Markets: See Markets

Silk Cut is a British brand of cigarettes, currently owned and manufactured by Gallaher Group, a subsidiary of Japan Tobacco. The packaging is characterised by a distinctive stark white packet with the brand name in a purple, blue, red, silver, white or green square.

== History ==
Silk Cut was launched in 1964. Previously, Silk Cut cigarettes contained approximately 75% tobacco, the rest of the filling being Cytrel, a cellulose-based tobacco substitute.

Today, Cytrel is no longer used in manufacturing the cigarette, making them additive-free.

English professional rugby league football competition the 1984–85 Challenge Cup was named the Silk Cut Challenge Cup due to sponsorship from the company. This branding would continue through the 1980s and 1990s.

The brand increased in popularity around the world throughout the 1970s and 1980s as the dangers of cigarette smoking became well known and consumers switched to a lower-tar brand. At 5 mg tar, Silk Cut contained less than half the tar content of stronger brands such as Benson & Hedges or Marlboro.

Production company Gallaher held a Royal Warrant of Appointment for 122 years, until the warrant was revoked in 1999 by Queen Elizabeth II. Her son the-then Prince of Wales' rigorous anti-smoking campaigning is thought to have been a major influence behind that decision. Gallaher was allowed one year to remove the Royal Coat of Arms from the brand's packaging.

The final year of the Challenge Cup tournament's sponsorship being named after Silk Cut was 2001.

Silk Cut is also available in a lower-tar version and an ultra-low-tar version with a tar content of only 0.1 mg. When terms such as "light" and "low tar" were made illegal to use in the UK for use of tobacco promotion (for fear that it misled smokers into thinking such products were safer), some commentators predicted that Silk Cut's name and good brand-recognition as a low-tar product would favourably affect sales of the brand to health-conscious consumers. Silk Cut Blue cigarettes contain 0.3 mg nicotine and tar content is 3 mg. Silk Cut Silver cigarettes contain 0.1 mg nicotine and tar content is 1 mg. Silk Cut White cigarettes contain 0.01 mg nicotine and tar content is 0.5 mg. Silk Cut cigarettes are also available in a "100s" range (superking).

It is a misconception that the tobacco in Silk Cut contains less nicotine than other cigarette tobacco. The lower nicotine levels are caused by the design of the filter, which has many more holes than regular strength cigarette filters, to mix the smoke with air.

In 2013, limited edition packs of Silk Cut cigarettes were introduced to celebrate its fiftieth anniversary.

== Advertising campaigns ==
In the 1970s, Silk Cut was advertised in several popular cinema advertisements, including a parody of the Battle of Rorke's Drift, as portrayed in the film Zulu (1964), and of British POWs escaping from a German prison camp.

The brand was also made popular by a surrealistic advertising campaign launched in 1984, in preparation for a ban on named tobacco advertising. By using the typical colours of the brand, the first surrealistic advertisement of Silk Cut showed a purple silk cloth with a single cut running through it, showing behind it a white background. The name of the cigarette brand never appears on this advertisement, nor are any other objects linked to smoking visible, such as packs of cigarettes or smoke. The only hint for the viewer that this advertisement concerns a cigarette brand at all is the mandatory health warning at the bottom. Based on a series of works by avantgardist artist Lucio Fontana, this first advertisement represented a wordplay on the brand name Silk Cut. This kind of understated advertisement brought together art and life and was unprecedented except for a similar, but not as daring, Benson & Hedges campaign in the 1970s.

The campaign went on to be a huge success, making Silk Cut the best-selling brand at the beginning of the 1990s. Silk Cut went on to produce many more advertisements in this style, playing with surrealistic themes and pop cultural references, like Man Ray's "Cadeau" as well as Alfred Hitchcock's famous shower curtain scene from the movie Psycho (1960). In later parts of the campaign they also created original surrealistic themes for the ads.

The main idea behind the use of surrealism for an advertising campaign was to catch the attention of the viewer by giving him or her a riddle to solve, i.e. guessing which product or brand was actually advertised. Only those who could link the images would eventually come to the conclusion that this is an advertisement for the cigarette brand Silk Cut. This worked as a rewarding sensation for the viewer, attaching positive emotions (for successfully solving the riddle) with the brand. However, it was also possible to interpret darker and sexual themes into the images of the campaign, even though this was most likely not intended.

After a running time of almost two decades, the final poster in the series was in 2002 when all tobacco advertising in the UK was finally banned and showed an opera singer, wearing a purple silk dress which had split at the seams – a reference to the saying "It's not over until the fat lady sings".

However, sales of Silk Cut cigarettes continued to grow even after the campaign had ended, thanks to sport sponsorship and to many special edition packs, as well as changes on the pack shape, texture, style of opening, cellophane, foil and inner frame. The market share grew 1.1% from 2004 to 2008, and a 2.9% from 2008 to 2011.

== Sport sponsorship ==
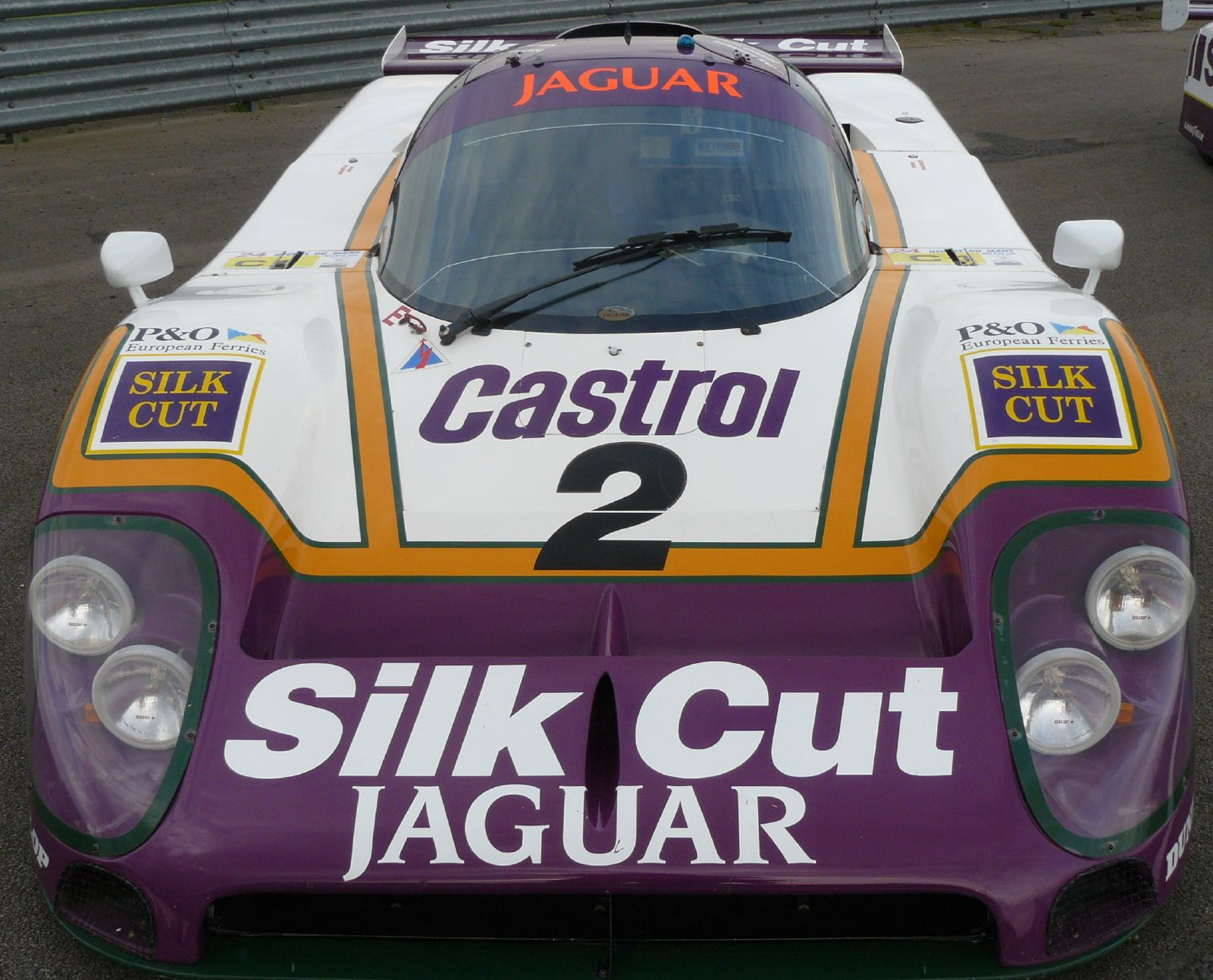
Silk Cut sponsored Jaguar XJR-9

Silk Cut was the title sponsor of rugby league's Challenge Cup between 1985 and 2001, and the competition was known as the "Silk Cut Challenge Cup". Silk Cut also sponsored the Tom Walkinshaw Racing Jaguar XJR sportscars that competed in World Sportscar Championship, including the 24 Heures du Mans, but not in North America because of IMSA's title sponsorship of the GT series by RJ Reynolds Tobacco Company's Camel brand, which would have run the team in violation of the Viceroy Rule. It is now illegal to advertise tobacco in many countries and the adverts have stopped. In the 1990s, Silk Cut was the best selling brand in the United Kingdom, but sales have declined behind cheaper budget brands as tax on tobacco has increased. In an attempt to counteract this, the manufacturers responded in the new millennium by introducing bevelled corners to redesigned regular gauge packaging, and marketing their first "slim" cigarette in the UK, even though this was not the first "slim" cigarette available in the UK as More, Karelia and Vogue are available in most tobacconists. Capri were available in the UK until the mid-1990s.

== Controversy ==
=== JTI battling future UK plain packaging law ===
In 2013, JTI announced it would fight the future introduction of plain packaging laws in the United Kingdom.

Gallaher Group, which includes Benson & Hedges and Silk Cut among its brands and is part of tobacco giant Japan Tobacco International (JTI), is campaigning against government plans to force cigarettes to be sold in plain packages. In March 2013, Gallaher had three ads challenging the government's proposals for plain cigarette packaging banned by the Advertising Standards Authority, after complaints from ASH (Action on Smoking and Health) and Cancer Research. The ASA found the ads were "misleading" and lacking "substantiation".

Jorge da Motta, the managing director of JTI UK, said: "We are using this media campaign to demonstrate that in 2011, even the Department of Health accepted that these proposals are not supported by any hard evidence. We hope common sense will prevail and that the Government will disregard this proposal, before embarking on a process which will do nothing more than deprive the Treasury of much-needed revenue and make hundreds of millions of pounds for the criminals who manufacture, distribute and sell illegal tobacco products. We have always argued that plain packaging will not prevent children from smoking, but enforcing existing initiatives such as 'No ID, No Sale', punishing those who buy tobacco on the behalf of children and cutting the illegal supply chain, can work."

== Markets ==
Silk Cut is mainly sold in the United Kingdom. It was or is exported to Ireland, the Channel Islands, Sweden, the Netherlands, Germany, France, Austria, Switzerland, Spain, Italy, Malta, Poland, Hungary, Greece, Cyprus, Lithuania, Hong Kong, Australia, United States and Antigua.

== In popular culture ==
Silk Cut is the preferred cigarette brand of the DC Comics character John Constantine, Helen Fielding's fictional character Bridget Jones, The Magnus Archives' titular Archivist, and French author Michel Houellebecq.

In an episode of the Scottish sitcom Still Game, Winston Ingram has a leg amputated owing to his previous habit of smoking eighty cigarettes a day for many years. He remarks: "Senior Service tae, nae arsin' about wae yer poofy Silkies!" Senior Service cigarettes were renowned for being unfiltered and ultra strong, in contrast to the extreme mildness of Silk Cut.

In the music video for "Come On Eileen" by Dexys Midnight Runners, a sign advertising Silk Cut is seen in the shop window behind the band as they perform.

== See also ==
- Tobacco smoking
