= Gallaher Group =

Former international tobacco and cigarette company

Gallaher Limited

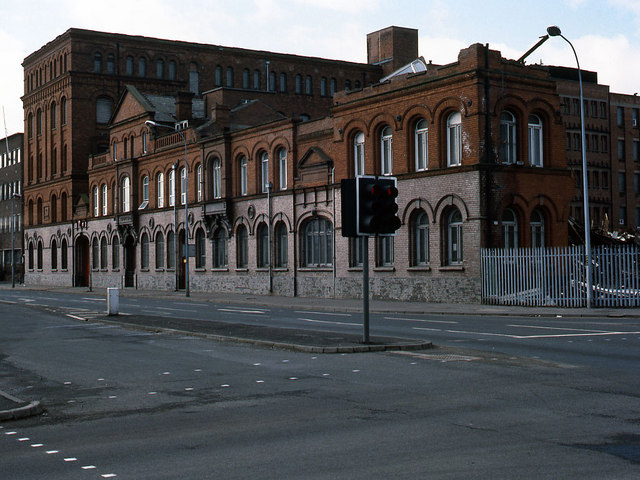
- Former Gallaher's factory on York Street, Belfast, 1990
- Type: Pvt. Ltd. (1857–1974); Subsidiary (1974–2015)
- Industry: Tobacco
- Predecessor: Austria Tabak
- Founded: 1857
- Defunct: 2015; 11 years ago
- Headquarters: Weybridge, Surrey, England
- Key people: John Gildersleeve (Chairman); Nigel Northridge (CEO)
- Products: Cigarettes, Tobacco
- Brands: List: Amber Leaf; Benson & Hedges; Hamlet Cigars; Kensitas Club; Liggett Ducat; Mayfair; Nil; Senior Service; Silk Cut; Sobranie; Sterling
- Revenue: £8,401 million (2006)
- Operating income: £660 million (2006)
- Net income: £408 million (2006)
- Parent: Japan Tobacco

Gallaher Group, referred to as Gallaher's Tobacco, or simply Gallaher's, was a United Kingdom-based multinational tobacco company which traded on the London Stock Exchange and was a constituent of the FTSE 100 Index, prior to its acquisition by American Tobacco in 1974. In April 2007, it was acquired by Japan Tobacco. Japan Tobacco trades in the United Kingdom as Gallaher Ltd.

== History ==
The business was founded in 1857 by Tom Gallaher in Derry, Ireland. Gallaher moved premises to Hercules Street in 1863. In 1881, the premises moved to York Street, North Belfast. By 1896, Gallaher had opened the largest tobacco factory in the world in Belfast, known as Gallagher's Tobacco Factory. The business was incorporated on 28 March 1896 to "carry on in all their branches the businesses of tobacco, cigar, cigarettes and snuff manufacture".

Formerly manufacturing in London and Dublin, Gallaher moved production to Belfast (cigarettes) and Wales (cigars) in the early 20th century.

Gallaher went on to acquire a number of rival companies including J. A. Pattreiouex (1937), J. R. Freeman (1947), Cope Bros & Co (1952) and Benson & Hedges (1955).

In 1962, Gallaher acquired J Wix & Co., the British subsidiary of American Tobacco, in exchange for Gallaher shares. As a result, American Tobacco owned 13% of Gallaher Ltd. In July 1968, American Tobacco increased its ownership to 28%. American continued to increase its ownership for several years and by October 1974 Gallaher Ltd had become a 100%-owned subsidiary of American Brands (as American Tobacco was now known).

Gallaher held a Royal Warrant of Appointment for 122 years, until the warrant was revoked in 1999 by Queen Elizabeth II. Her son, the Prince of Wales' rigorous anti-smoking campaigning is thought to have been a major influence behind that decision. Gallaher was allowed one year to remove the Royal Coat of Arms from its brands bearing the mark on their packaging.

On 4 August 2000 Gallaher completed the acquisition of Liggett Ducat, Russia's number one cigarette brand. In January 2002, Gallaher became the 100% owner of Austria's former nationalised biggest tobacco-company Austria Tabak.

In 2002 US tobacco firm Reynolds formed Reynolds-Gallaher International to access cigarette sales in most countries in the European Union. The agreement was scheduled to run through 2012 but in May 2007, as a result of the acquisition of Gallaher Group by Japan Tobacco, it was announced that this joint-venture would cease in November 2007.

Japan Tobacco became the sole owner of the Gallaher Group on 18 April 2007, in the largest ever foreign acquisition in Japanese history.

The closure of the former J. R. Freeman's factory in Cardiff was announced in September 2007, with all work scheduled to move to the Ballymena factory by September 2009.

In 2015, JTI Gallaher announced the closure of their Ballymena operations with all work relocating to Poland in a cost saving measure by 2017. This resulted in the loss of 860 jobs in the town.

== Operations ==
Until acquisition by Japan Tobacco, Gallaher operated primarily in the United Kingdom and continental Europe, with smaller operations in Central Asia, Africa and the Middle East. Gallaher was the third largest of the three major British tobacco groups after British American Tobacco and Imperial Tobacco.

Gallaher-owned brands included Benson & Hedges (with Philip Morris International, British American Tobacco, and Japan Tobacco), Silk Cut, Sterling, Mayfair, Crystal, Nil, Kensitas Club, Senior Service, Dos Hermanos, Gold Seal, Amber Leaf, Sobranie, Hamlet Cigars, Logic (vape) and Nordic Spirit (nicotine pouch).

In the UK, Japan Tobacco International maintains a national distribution centre in Crewe and Business Service Centre in Manchester.

== Gallery ==
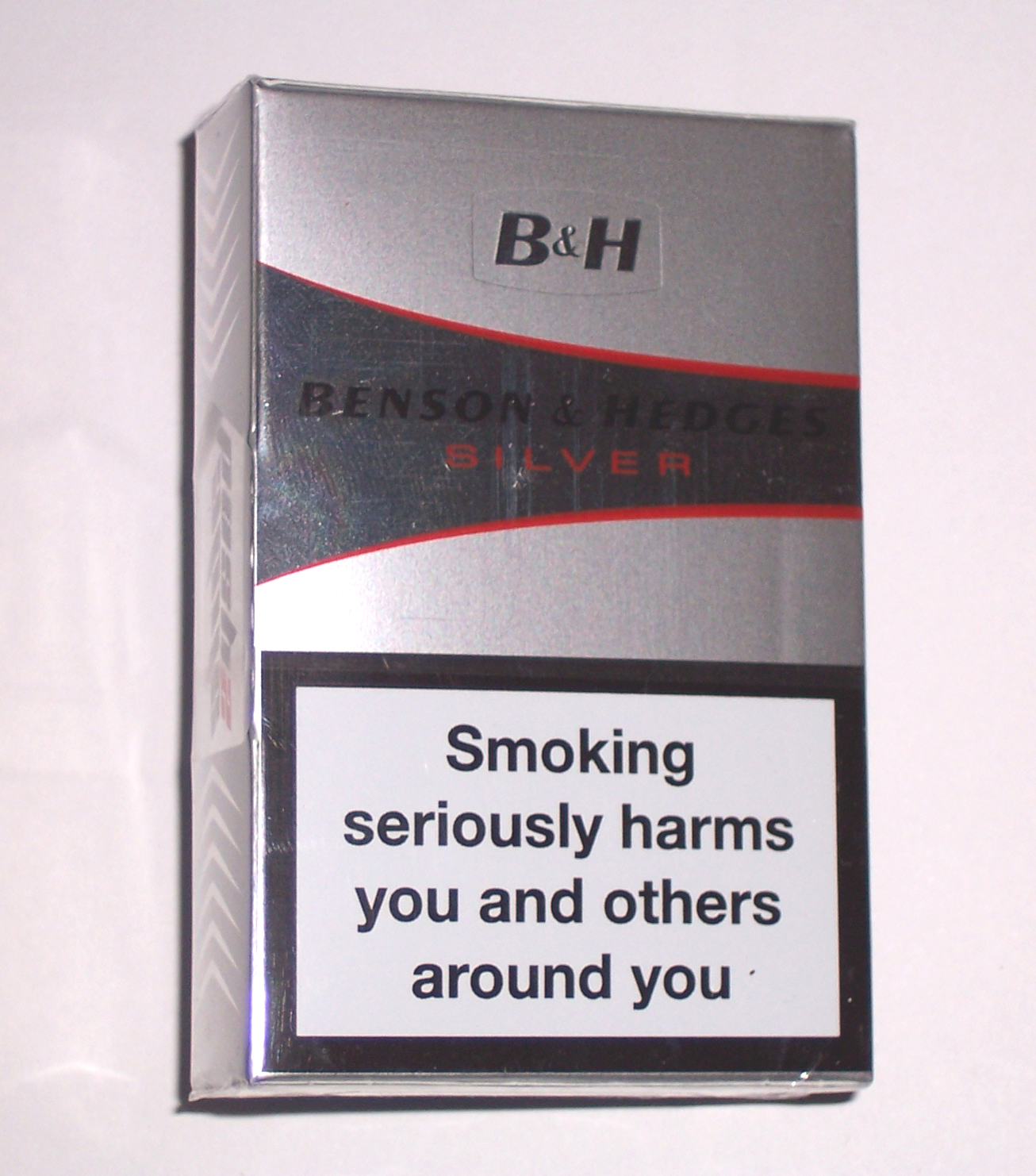
Benson & Hedges pack

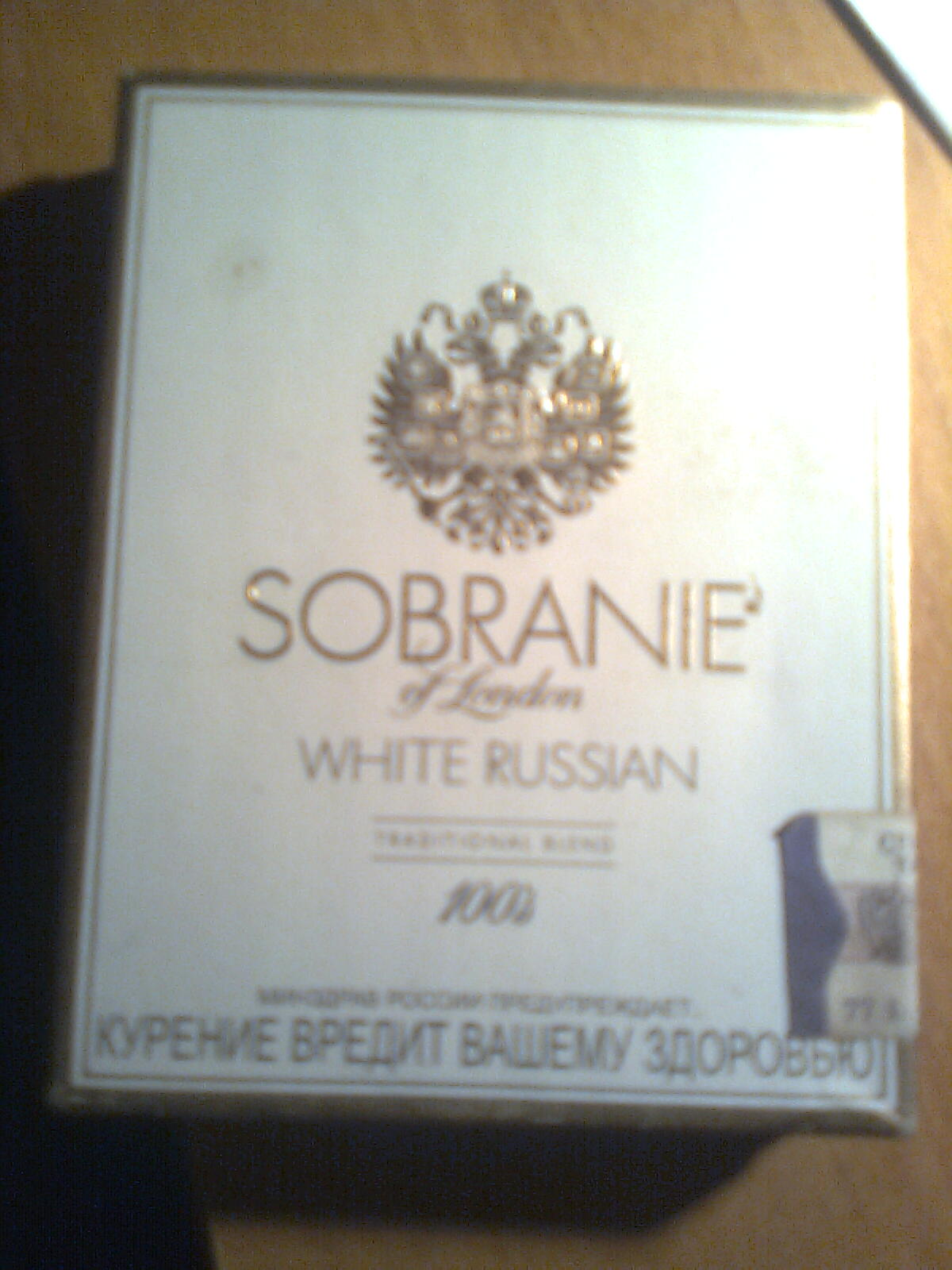
Sobranie pack

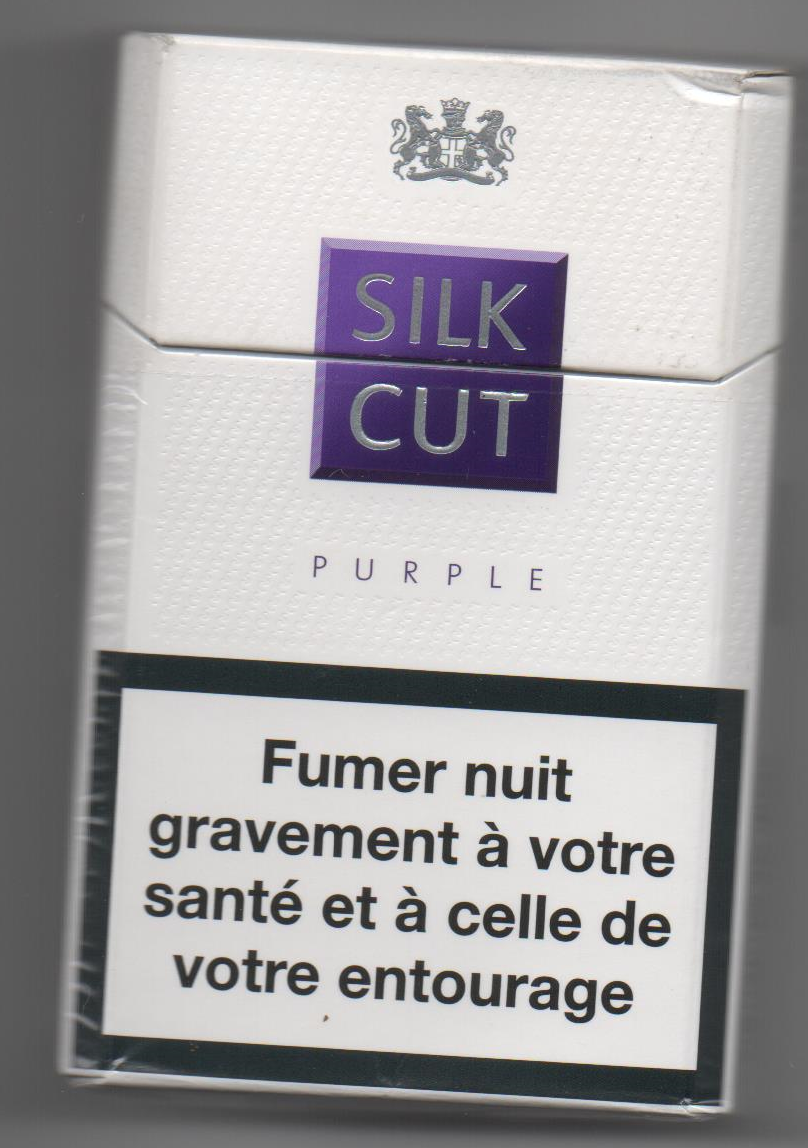
Silk Cut pack

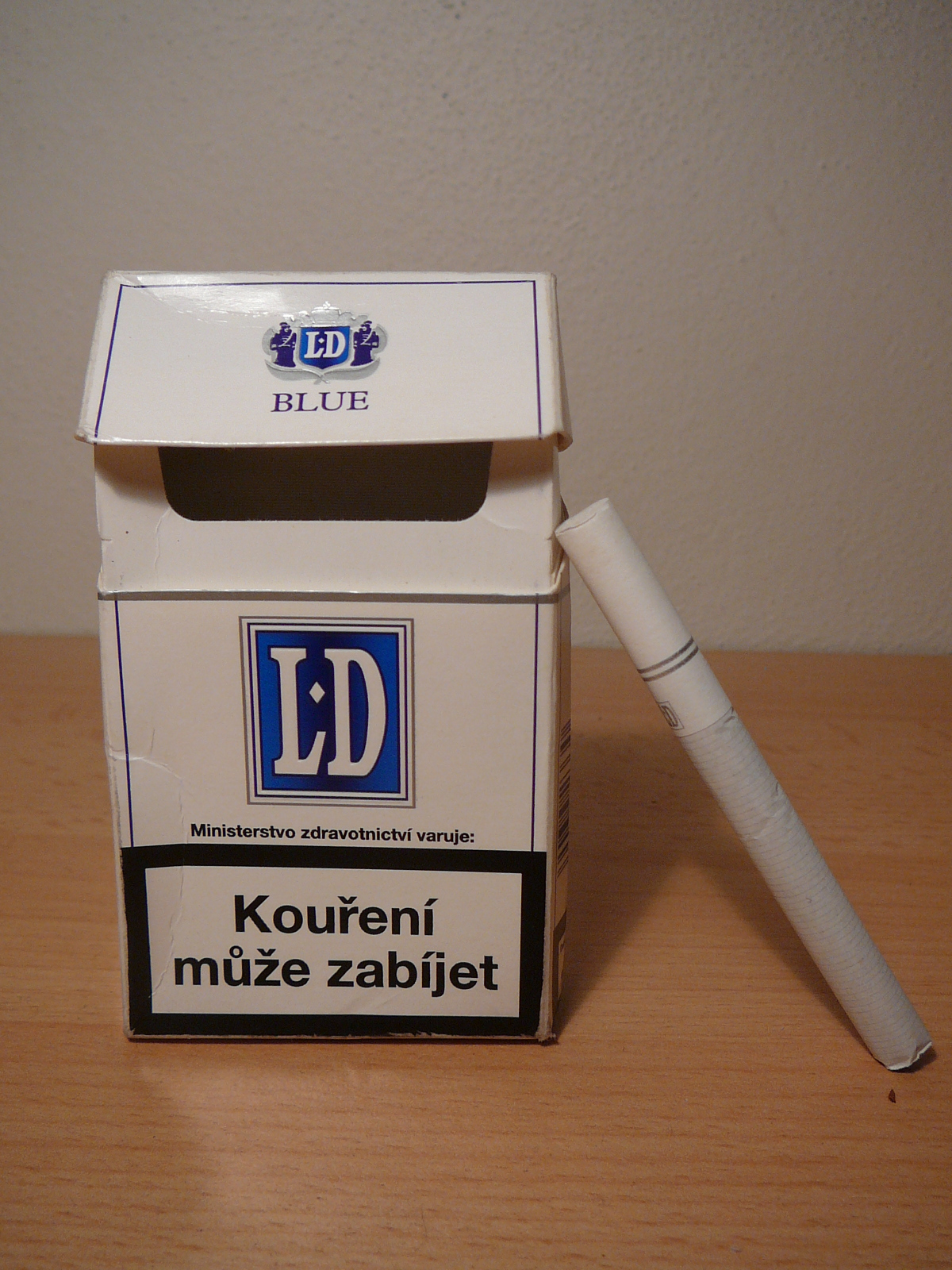
LD pack

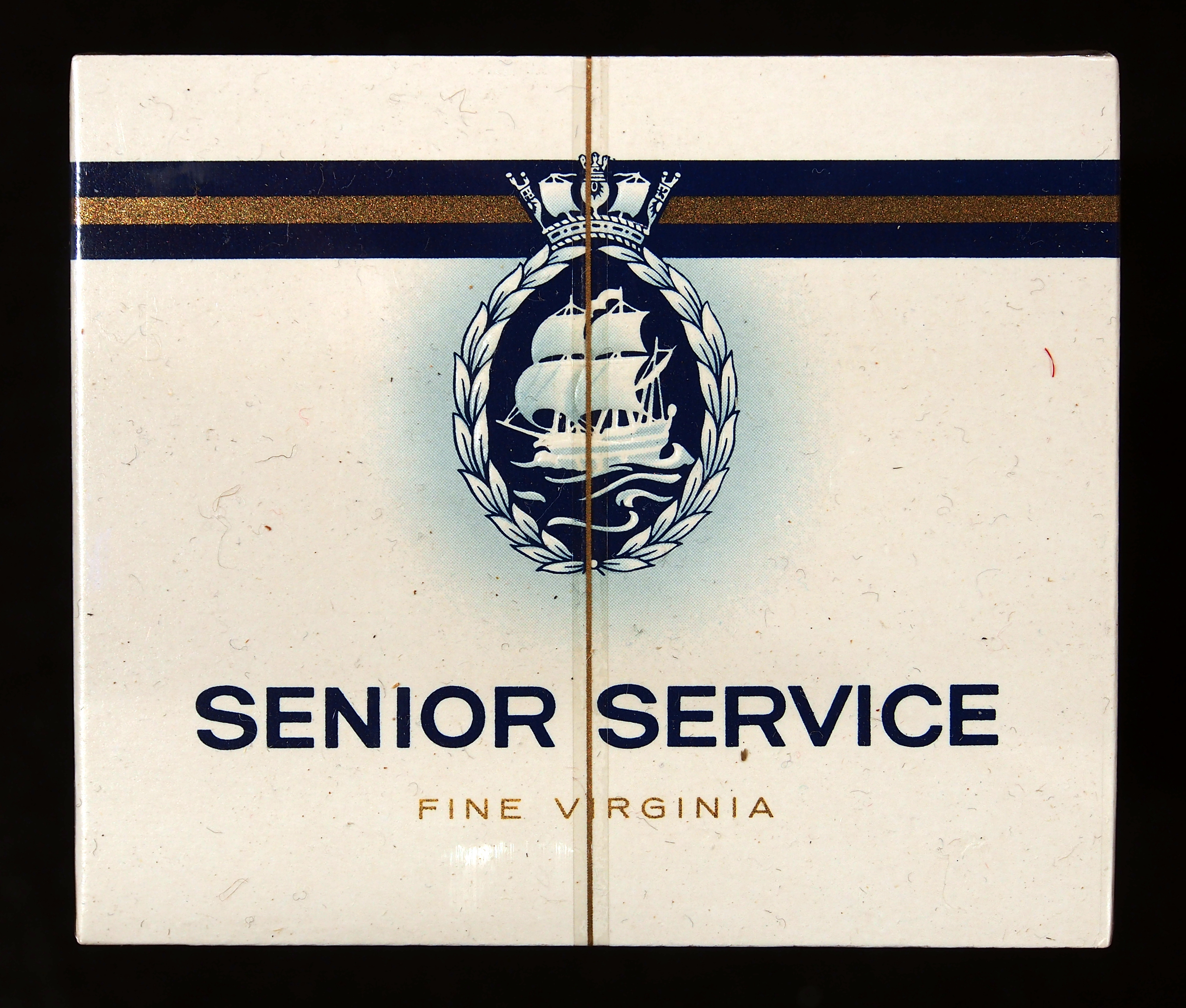
Senior Service pack

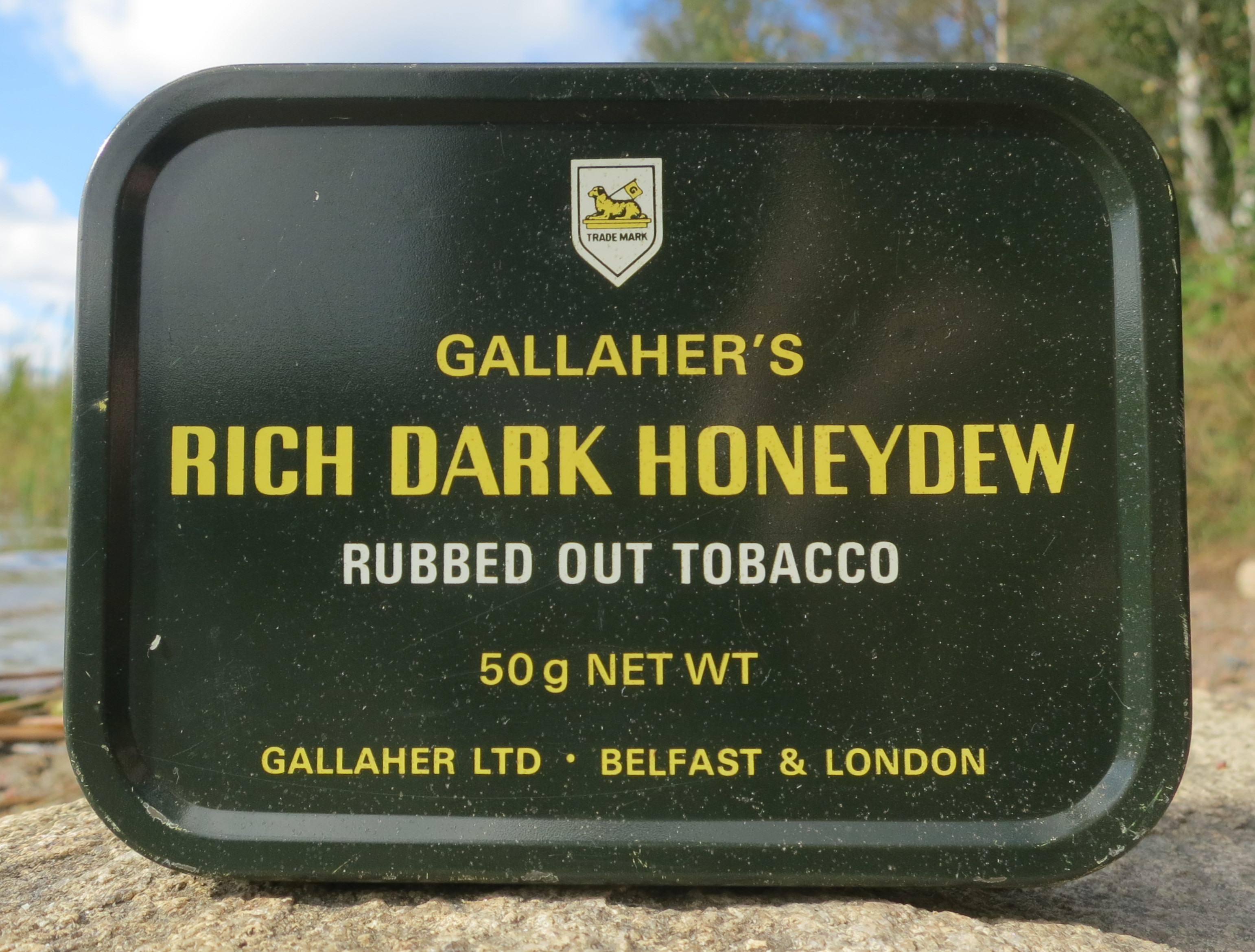
1970s pipe tobacco tin by Gallaher's

Kensitas extra size box
