= Sakura (name) =

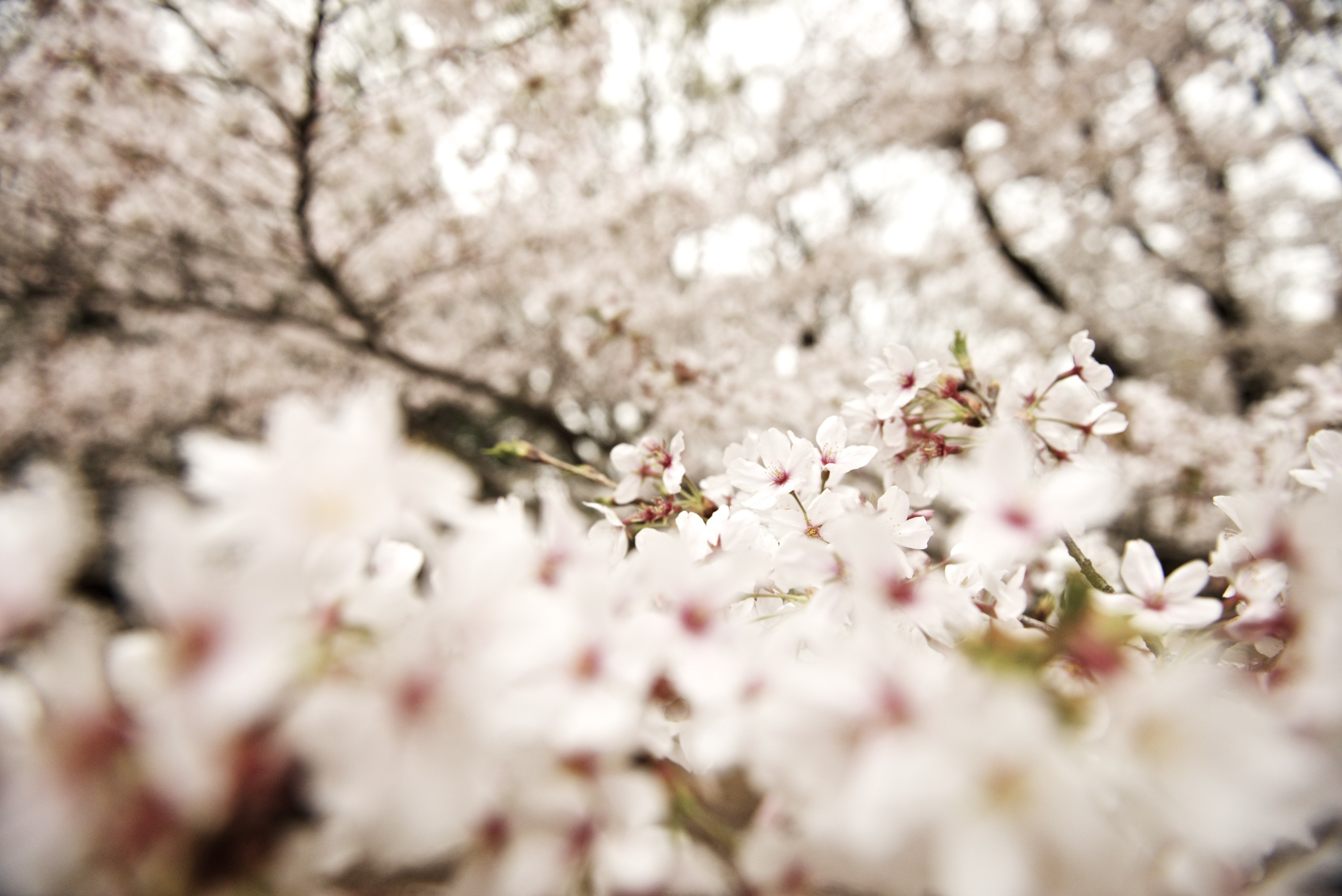
- Cherry blossom in Japan, 2013, the origin of the name Sakura.
- Pronunciation: [sä́.kɯ̈̀.ɾä̀]
- Gender: Gender neutral
- Language: Japanese

Origin
- Origin: Japanese
- Meaning: Depending on the kanji used
- Region of origin: Japan

Other names
- Related names: Sakurako, Sakurazawa, Sakurano, Sakurana

Sakura (さくら・サクラ; Japanese pronunciation: [sä́.kɯ̈̀.ɾä̀] (Note: The placename and personal name Sakura is pronounced with an accent, unlike the common noun sakura (桜; [sä̀.kɯ̈́.ɾä́]) from which it derives.)) is commonly found as a feminine Japanese given name, also being occasionally given to males. Sakura is also found as a surname.

== Spellings ==
Sakura can be spelt in kanji in multiple ways: 桜, 櫻, 咲良, 佐倉, 沙倉, 佐久良。 Apart from the first two, the rest are phonetic or phonosemantic spellings, based on the vowels and consonants of the name. As a surname, the spellings 佐倉 and 佐久良 have been used. 佐倉 is also a placename.

== People ==
=== Given name ===
- Sakura Akaho (赤穂 さくら; born 1996), Japanese women's basketball player
- Sakura Ando (安藤 サクラ; born 1986), Japanese actress
- Sakura Andō (singer) (安藤 咲桜; born 2001), Japanese singer and television personality
- Sakura Asagi (あさぎ 桜; born 1972), Japanese animator, illustrator, and manga artist
- Sakura Endō (遠藤 さくら; born 2001), Japanese singer, actress, and fashion model
- Sakura Fujiwara (藤原 さくら; born 1995), Japanese singer-songwriter and actress
- Sakura Hauge (サクラ ハウゲ; born 1987), Norwegian-born Japanese handball goalkeeper
- Sakura Hayakawa (早川 さくら; born 1997), Japanese former individual rhythmic gymnast
- Sakura Hirota (広田 さくら; born 1997), Japanese politician and semi-retired professional wrestler
- Sakura Hosogi (細木 咲良; born 2000), Japanese tennis player
- Sakura Ishimoto (石本 さくら; born 1999), Japanese shogi player
- Sakura Ishiyama (石山 咲良; born 2004), Japanese member of Juice=Juice
- Sakura Kawasaki (川﨑 桜; born 2003), Japanese member of Nogizaka46
- Sakura Kinoshita (木下 さくら), Japanese manga artist
- Sakura Koiwai (小祝 さくら; born 1998), Japanese professional golfer
- Sakura Kokumai (國米 櫻; born 1992), American karateka
- Sakura Komoriya (籠谷 さくら; born 1999), Japanese singer
- Sakura Masuki (舛木 さくら; born 2004), Japanese badminton player
- Sakura Matsuo (松尾 桜; born 2005), Japanese member of Hinatazaka46
- Sakura Miyajima (宮島 咲良; born 1983), Japanese tarento, free announcer, and singer
- Sakura Miyawaki (宮脇 咲良; born 1998), Japanese singer and member of South Korean girl group Le Sserafim and former member of groups: AKB48, HKT48, and Iz*One
- Sakura Mizutani (水谷 咲良; born 2003), Japanese rugby union and sevens player
- Sakura Mori (森 さくら; born 1996), Japanese table tennis player
- Sakura Motoki (元木 咲良; born 2002), Japanese freestyle wrestler
- Elizabeth Sakura Narita (成田・エリザベス・サクラ; born 1974), known as Lisa, Japanese singer, songwriter and producer
- Sakura Nogawa (野川 さくら; born 1978), Japanese voice actress and singer
- Sakura Nojima (野島 さくら; born 1999), Japanese professional footballer
- Sakura Nomura (能村 さくら; born 1976), Japanese female mixed martial artist and kickboxer
- Sakura Noshitani (熨斗谷 さくら; born 1997), Japanese former group rhythmic gymnast
- Sakura Oda (小田 さくら; born 1999), Japanese singer and member of the J-pop girl group Morning Musume
- Sakura Onishi (尾西 桜; born 2006), Japanese freestyle wrestler
- Sakura Pascarelli, Italian physicist and the scientific director at the European XFEL
- Mansa Sakura (Arabic: ساكورة, fl. 13th–14th century), mansa of the Mali Empire who reigned during the late 13th century
- Sakura Saunders (born in 1979), American writer
- Sakura Schafer-Nameki, German mathematical physicist
- Sakura Tange (丹下 桜; born 1973), Japanese voice actress, singer and writer
- Sakura Tsukagoshi (塚越 さくら; born 1991), Japanese professional racing cyclist
- Sakura Tsukuba (筑波 さくら), Japanese manga artist
- Sakura Uchikoshi (打越 さく良; born 1968), Japanese politician
- Sakura Yokomine (横峯 さくら; born 1985), Japanese professional golfer
- Sakura Yosozumi (四十住 さくら; born 2002), Japanese professional skateboarder
- Sakura Yumoto (湯元 さくら; born 1997), Japanese artistic gymnast

=== Surname ===
- Ashika Sakura (さくら あしか; born 1994), Japanese manga artist
- Aya Sakura (さくら あや; born 1996), Japanese professional wrestler
- Ayane Sakura (佐倉 綾音; born 1994), Japanese voice actress
- Emi Sakura (さくら えみ; born 1976), Japanese professional wrestler
- Hinano Sakura (桜 ひなの; born 2004), Japanese member of Iginari Tohoku San
- Kaoru Sakura (佐倉 薫; born 1990), Japanese voice actress
- Mana Sakura (紗倉 まな; born 1993), Japanese AV idol, gravure model, novelist and singer
- Sakura Miko (さくらみこ), Japanese virtual YouTuber
- Maya Sakura (さくら まや; born 1998), Japanese enka singer and child actress
- Momoko Sakura (さくら ももこ; 1965–2018), Japanese manga artist and the main character depicted in her own manga Chibi Maruko-chan
- Mutsuko Sakura (桜 むつ子; 1921–2005), Japanese enka singer and child actress
- Nichole Sakura (born 1989), American actress and model
- Sōgorō Sakura (佐倉 惣五郎; 1605–1653), legendary Japanese farmer
- Tamakichi Sakura (桜 玉吉; born 1961), Japanese manga artist

=== Stage name ===
- Sakura (musician) (real name Yasunori Sakurazawa 櫻澤 泰徳, born 1969), Japanese musician and former drummer of the rock band L'Arc-en-Ciel
- Sakura Candle (born 1979), Japanese professional wrestler
- Nath-Sakura (born 1973), Catalan-Spanish photographer
- Rock M. Sakura, American drag queen

== Fictional characters ==
=== Given name ===
- Sakura (さくら), the younger sister of Tora-san in the film series Otoko wa Tsurai yo
- Sakura (Daisy), a character in the Pokémon anime series
- Princess Sakura (サクラ), alternate self of Sakura Kinomoto in Tsubasa: Reservoir Chronicle
- Sakura (Urusei Yatsura) (サクラ), a character from the manga and anime franchise Urusei Yatsura
- Sakura, a non-playable Mii opponent in the Wii series
- Sakura Akamatsu (紗孔羅), a character from the Betterman anime series
- Sakura Amamiya, a character from the game Project Sakura Wars
- Sakura Hagiwara (萩原 さくら), a main character of the manga series Wanna Be the Strongest in the World!
- Sakura Haruno (春野 サクラ), a heroine of the manga and anime series Naruto
- Sakura Haruno (春野 桜), a main character in Wandaba Style
- Sakura Hanasaki (花咲 さくら), also known as Celeste, Momoko Hanasaki's mother a character in Wedding Peach
- Sakura Kakei (筧 朔羅), a character from the manga Get Backers
- Sakura Kagamihara (各務原 桜), Nadeshiko Kagamihara's older sister from the manga and anime Laid-Back Camp
- Sakura Kaname (要 咲良), a character from the anime Fafner in the Azure
- Sakura Kasugano (春日野 さくら), a character from the Street Fighter series of fighting games
- Sakura Kinomoto (木之本 桜), the main heroine of the manga and anime series Cardcaptor Sakura. In the English dub of the original anime titled Cardcaptors, her name is Sakura Avalon.
- Sakura Kitaōji (北大路 さくら), a character in anime series Aikatsu!
- Sakura Kiyashiki (春野 サクラ), a character of the manga and anime series Assassination Classroom
- Sakura Kono (河野 桜), a character from the manga and anime Hori-san to Miyamura-kun (Horimiya)
- Sakura Konotori Dr. Storks Netflix series main character
- Sakura Kusakabe (草壁桜), main character of the Bludgeoning Angel Dokuro-Chan anime
- Sakura Mamiya (真宮 桜), a main character from the manga Rin-ne
- Sakura Matō (間桐 桜), a main character in the adult visual novel Fate/Stay Night
- Sakura Minamoto, a character from the MAPPA idol anime series Zombie Land Saga
- Sakura Nishihori (西堀 さくら), main character from the 2006 tokusatsu television series, GoGo Sentai Boukenger
- Sakura Ogawa (小川さくら), a character from the novel, manga, and film Battle Royale
- Sakura Ogami (大神 さくら), a character in the visual novel Danganronpa: Trigger Happy Havoc
- Sakura Rokujo, a main character from the anime and manga series Tokko
- Sakura Sakurakouji (桜小路 桜), the main character in the manga series Code: Breaker
- Sakura Shimano (しまの さくら), Shimajirou's mother in the anime series Shima Shima Tora no Shimajirou
- Sakura Shinguji (真宮寺 さくら), a character from the Sakura Wars video games, anime and manga
- Sakura Yae (八重 桜), a character from the manga and game Really? Really!
- Sakura Yamauchi (山内桜良, Yamauchi Sakura), a character of the novel, manga and anime series I Want to Eat Your Pancreas
- Sakura Yoshino (芳乃さくら), a major character from the D.C.: Da Capo games and anime
- Sakura, Youngest Princess in the game Fire Emblem Fates
- Sakura Himedaka (姫鷹さくら, Himedaka Sakura), a character of the novel, manga and anime series Agents of the Four Seasons

=== Surname ===
- Chiyo Sakura (佐倉 千代), a main character in Monthly Girls' Nozaki-kun
- Futaba Sakura and her adopted father Sojiro Sakura, major characters in Persona 5
- Hane Sakura, the main character in Bakuon!!
- Haruka Sakura (桜 遥), the main character of Wind Breaker
- Ichiko Sakura, protagonist of Binbō-gami ga!
- Kyoko Sakura, (佐倉 杏子), a main character in the Puella Magi Madoka Magica series
- Mikan Sakura (佐倉 蜜柑), main character of Gakuen Alice
- Miku Sakura (桜 みく), a main protagonist in I Want to End This Love Game
- Momoko Sakura (さくら ももこ), the main character's real name in the shōjo manga series Chibi Maruko-chan
- Uta Sakura, protagonist of You and Idol Pretty Cure

== See also ==
- Sakura (disambiguation)
- Sakura Bakushin O (サクラバクシンオー; 1989–2011) Japanese thoroughbred racehorse and sire
- Sakura Chitose O (サクラチトセオー; 1990–2014) Japanese thoroughbred racehorse and stud
- Sakura Chiyono O (サクラチヨノオー; 1985–2012) Japanese Thoroughbred racehorse and stud
- Sakura Laurel (サクラローレル; 1991–2020) Japanese Thoroughbred racehorse and former stud
