= Sakurako =

- Pronunciation: [sa.kɯ.ɾaꜜ.ko]
- Gender: Female
- Language: Japanese

Origin
- Origin: Japanese
- Meaning: Different meanings depending on the kanji used
- Region of origin: Japan

Other names
- Related names: Sakura, Sakurano, Sakurana, Sakurazawa

Sakurako (桜子・櫻子; Japanese pronunciation: [sa.kɯ.ɾaꜜ.ko]) is a feminine Japanese given name. Notable people with the name include:

- Sakurako Gokurakuin (極楽院 櫻子), Japanese manga artist
- Sakurako Hatada (畑田 桜子; born 2003), Japanese rugby union player
- Sakurako Kaoru (薫 桜子; born 1982), Japanese gravure model, AV idol and pink film actress
- Sakurako Kidoguchi (木戸口 桜子; born 1999), Japanese former idol of idol group Super Girls
- Sakurako Kimino (公野 櫻子), Japanese writer
- Sakurako Konishi (小西 桜子; born 1998), Japanese actress
- Sakurako Korai (向來 桜子; born 2003), Japanese rugby union player
- Sakurako Ohara (大原 櫻子; born 1996), Japanese actress and singer
- Sakurako Okubo (大久保 櫻子; born 1998), Japanese actress
- Sakurako Omoto (尾本 桜子; born 1998), Japanese field hockey player
- Sakurako Terada (寺田 桜子; born 1984), Japanese curler
- Sakurako Wada (和田 桜子; born 2001), Japanese idol of idol group Magnolia Factory

== Fictional characters ==
- Sakurako Kujō (九条 櫻子), the titular character in the light novel and anime series Beautiful Bones: Sakurako's Investigation
- Sakurako Minase (水無瀬 桜子), a character in the visual novel Flyable Heart
- Sakurako Ohmuro (大室 櫻子), a character in the manga series YuruYuri
- Sakurako Sawatari (沢渡 桜子), a character in the television series Kamen Rider Kuuga
- Sakurako Sanjo (三条 桜子), a character in the manga and anime series Boys over Flowers
- Sakurako Shiina (椎名 桜子), a character in the manga and anime series Negima! Magister Negi Magi
- Sakurako Shikishima (敷島 桜子), a main character in the manga and anime series Mono
- Sakurako Utazumi (歌住 サクラコ), a character in the role-playing video game Blue Archive
- Sakurako Yukihira (雪平 桜子), a character in the manga and anime series Detective School Q
