= Oka =

Oka or OKA may refer to:

- "Officially known as", used to introduce an official name

== Vehicles ==
- Oka (automobile), a small car designed by AvtoVAZ and produced by ZMA and SeAZ
- OKA (truck), a large 4-wheel-drive vehicle made in Western Australia by the OKA Motor Company

== Military ==
- 2B1 Oka, Soviet 420 mm self-propelled mortar
- OTR-23 Oka, a theatre ballistic missile deployed by the Soviet Union

== Places ==
- Oka (Bithynia), a town of ancient Bithynia, now in Turkey
- Oka, Quebec, Canada, a village
- Oka National Park, near Oka, Quebec
- Oka, Akoko, the capital city of Akoko South-West Local Government of Ondo State, Nigeria
- Oka (river), in the European part of Russia
- Oka (Angara), a river in Siberia, Russia
- Oka, West Virginia, United States, an unincorporated community
- Oca (river), in northern Spain, spelled "Oka" in the Basque language
- Igbo spelling of Awka, a city in Nigeria, capital of Anambra State

== Codes ==
- Naha Airport, near Naha, Okinawa, IATA airport code OKA
- Okay Airways, based in Beijing, China, ICAO airline code OKA
- Okanagan language, ISO 639-3 language code oka, spoken in Canada and the United States

== Other uses ==
- Oka (surname), a Japanese surname
- Oka cheese, a Canadian cheese
- Oka (mass), an Ottoman unit of weight equal to 1.2829 kilograms
- 16494 Oka, an asteroid
- 81-760/761 "Oka", a model of subway car used on the Moscow Metro
- Tropical Storm Oka, a Pacific storm in 1987
- OKA Direct, a British retailer

== See also ==
- Ōka (disambiguation)
- Ōoka (disambiguation)
- Oca (disambiguation)
