= Ranmaru =

Ranmaru may refer to:

- Mori Ranmaru (森 蘭丸, 1565–1582), attendant in the service of Oda Nobunaga
- Ranmaru Morii, one of the leading characters of The Wallflower manga
- Ranmaru Shindo, one of the leading characters of the Tokko manga
