= Vera Lúcia de Miranda Guarda =

Brazilian human rights activist (born 1963)

- Born: 10 February 1963 (age 63); Tarumirim, Brazil
- Education: Joseph Fourier University
- Occupations: Chairperson on Water, Women and Development in Brazil
- Employer: UNESCO
- Known for: Human rights activism

Vera Lúcia de Miranda Guarda (February 10, 1963 -) is the United Nations Educational, Scientific and Cultural Organization (UNESCO) chairperson on Water, Women and Development in Brazil.

== Life and education ==
She was born on February 10, 1963, in Tarumirim, Brazil. In 1981 she began attending the School of Pharmacy at the Federal University of Ouro Preto. In 1992, she became the Conference Chair at the same university. In 1994, she attended the Joseph Fourier University in France.

== Work for UNESCO ==
In 2006, Guarda signed an agreement to establish and become the UNESCO Chair on Water, Women and Development in Brazil. In February 2012, she established the NuCát teaching, research and extension addition to the UNESCO Chair Core.

The committee aims to expand water resources and education for women. It aims to achieve sustainable development through focus on multiple and diverse disciplines and drawing connections between different socioeconomic groups and non-governmental organizations. It also focuses on women's economic development and independence, in hopes that women have equal power of choice in decisions affecting women and their families. The organization informs both men and women about the benefits of women having equal autonomy as men.

== See also ==
- Albertina de Oliveira Costa, Brazilian social scientist and activist
- Health in Brazil
- Nilcéia Freire, Brazilian women's rights activist
- Sônia Guajajara, Indigenous people's activist in Brazil
- Women's rights in Brazil
