= Ocas =

OCAS or Ocas may refer to:

- Obstacle Collision Avoidance System, audio visual beacons designed to alert pilots in immediate danger of flying into an obstacle
- Ontario College Application Service, a non-profit corporation
- Oberlin College of Arts & Sciences, a private liberal arts college

== See also ==
- Oca (disambiguation)
