= Nokia Lumia 1520 =

Windows Phone by Nokia

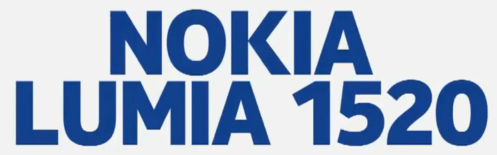

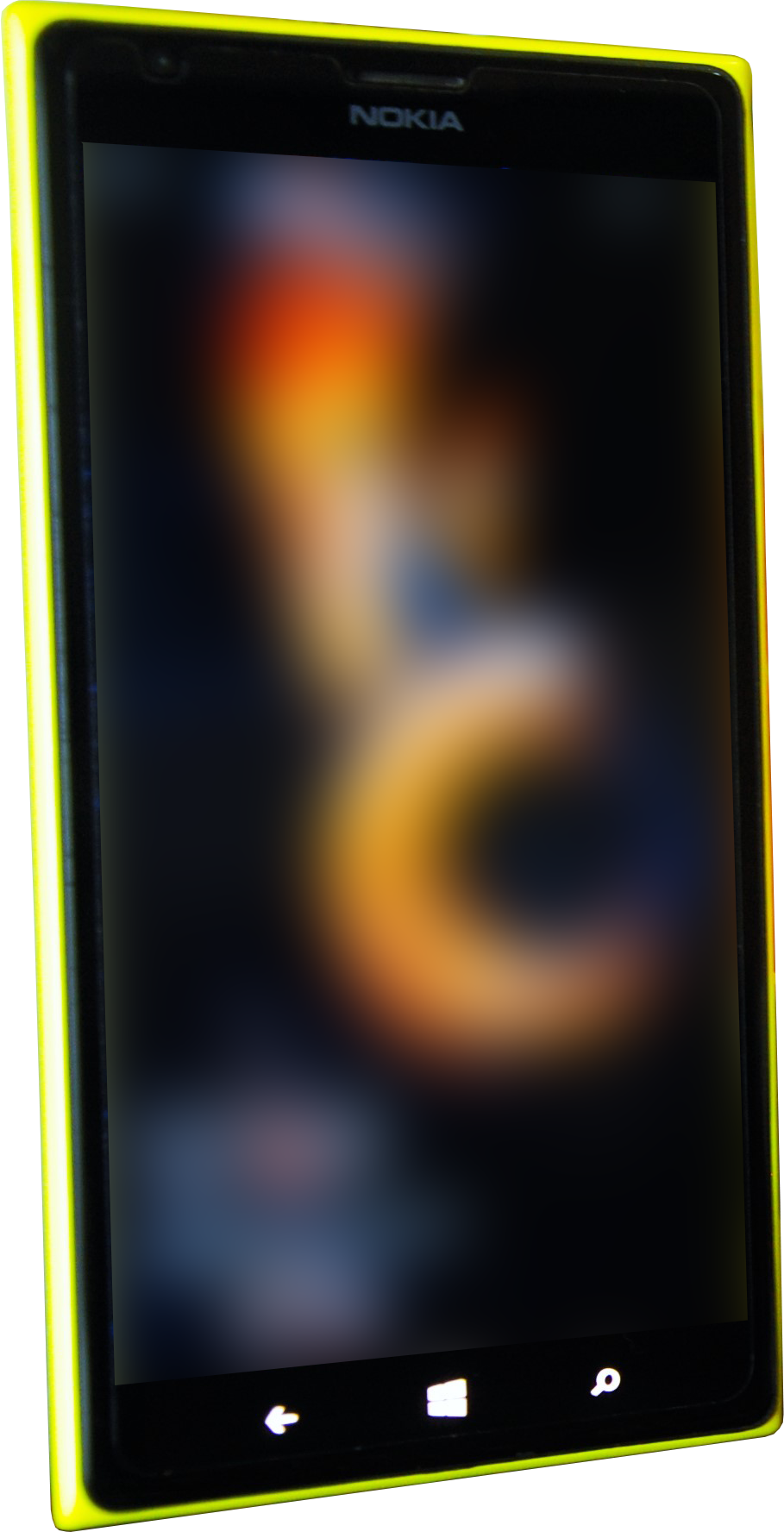
- Brand: Nokia
- Manufacturers: Nokia (January-April 2014); Microsoft Mobile (April 2014-2016)
- Type: Smartphone
- Series: Nokia Lumia
- First released: January 2014
- Availability by region: January–February 2014
- Discontinued: 7 April 2015 United States; 2016 (Worldwide)
- Predecessor: None
- Successor: Microsoft Lumia 950 XL
- Related: Nokia Lumia 1320; Nokia Lumia Icon; Nokia Lumia 930
- Form factor: Phablet
- Dimensions: 6.4 in (160 mm) H 3.3 in (84 mm) W 0.33 in (8.4 mm) D
- Weight: 209 g (7 oz)
- Operating system: Windows Phone 8, upgradeable to Windows Phone 8.1 and Windows 10 Mobile
- CPU: Qualcomm Snapdragon 800 quad-core 2.3 GHz
- GPU: Adreno 330
- Memory: 2 GB RAM
- Storage: 16/32 GB
- Removable storage: microSD up to 2 TB
- Battery: Non-removable Li-Ion 3400 mAh battery (BV-4BW)
- Rear camera: 20 MP PureView, 1/2.5" Image Sensor, six-element Carl Zeiss AG lens, OIS, 4K video recording added through subsequent software update
- Front camera: 1.2 MP
- Display: 6-inch ClearBlack IPS LCD Full HD (1920×1080) with Corning Gorilla Glass 2 protection
- Sound: Vibration; MP3, WAV ringtones alert type Loudspeaker; 3.5 mm headphone jack Dolby Headphone sound enhancement
- Connectivity: WiFi 802.11 a/b/g/n/ac, dual-band, Wi-Fi hotspot NFC; Bluetooth 4.0
- Model: 1520
- SAR: Head: 1.39 W/kg 1 g Body: 1.58 W/kg 1 g Hotspot: 0.35 W/kg 1 g
- Website: Nokia Lumia 1520

The Nokia Lumia 1520 is a flagship Windows Phone phablet smartphone designed and produced by Finnish telecommunications manufacturer Nokia in partnership with American software manufacturer Microsoft. The device was first announced at the Nokia World event on 22 October 2013 in Abu Dhabi, alongside its mid-range phablet stablemate the Nokia Lumia 1320 and Nokia's 10.1 inch Windows RT tablet the Nokia Lumia 2520. Until its discontinuation in the United States on 7 April 2015 the phone served as the flagship device for Nokia's Lumia Series and Microsoft's mobile effort. On 6 October 2015 Microsoft officially announced its flagship phablet successor, the Microsoft Lumia 950 XL, with availability sometime in November 2015.

The device was powered by a 2.2 GHz quad-core MSM8974 Snapdragon 800 system-on-chip with an ARM-based Krait 400 CPU produced by American semiconductor manufacturer Qualcomm. It was paired with 2 GB of RAM and a Qualcomm Adreno 330 GPU. The chassis was constructed of a highly durable polycarbonate unibody shell featuring the Lumia Series' signature bright colors. International units were available in black, white, red and yellow with a native storage capacity of 32 GB, expandable through a MicroSD card slot that can support up to 2 TB. The American version was sold exclusively through telecommunications provider AT&T, who limited onboard storage to 16 GB but offered an exclusive green color alongside the international colors. Germany also saw a green version with 32 GB storage and bundled apps from Deutsche Bahn, CEWE photo services, Zinio, Max Dome and N-TV.

The phone has an optically-bonded Full HD (1080p) IPS display with 16 million colors featuring Nokia's proprietary ClearBlack display technology, measuring 6 in (15 cm) diagonal with a 16:9 aspect ratio, resulting in a pixel density of 367 ppi. Protection came from a sheet of chemically strengthened Corning Gorilla Glass 2. The device shipped with Windows Phone 8 preinstalled and was upgradable to Windows Phone 8.1. It was eligible for Windows 10 Mobile, and can be upgraded through the Windows Insider program. The phone has a large non-removable 3400 mAh Li-Ion battery (BV-4BW), which gave it slightly longer endurance compared to its contemporaries from Android and iOS. The rear camera has 20 megapixels, is optically stabilized, and a subsequent software update introduced the ability to film in 4K (2160p) resolution.

Owing to its large dimensions and flagship specifications, the phone was viewed as a direct competitor to the Samsung Galaxy Note 3 and HTC One Max.

== Availability ==
The Lumia 1520 was initially released in Singapore, Hong Kong, the United States, France, China, Germany, Finland, Pakistan and India. In Australia, the Lumia 1520 was distributed exclusively through launch partner Harvey Norman. In the United States, AT&T was chosen as the sole carrier for the device.

Production of the Lumia 1520 has been officially discontinued.

== Design ==
The Lumia 1520's IPS LCD display is the first Windows Phone display to have a resolution of 1080p, allowing it to have three columns of Live Tiles and is covered with by Gorilla Glass 2. At 6 inch, the display has a pixel density of 368 pixels per inch. The phone has a 2.2 GHz Snapdragon 800 SoC, and a 20 megapixel PureView camera. It has 4G LTE and near field communication connectivity, and comes with 32 GB of built-in memory, with a possible further 2 TB expansion via microSD. At launch the highest capacity MicroSD cards available were 64 GB. MicroSD cards that comply with the SDXC standard top out at 2 TB. MicroSD cards over 64 GB will work as long as they are formatted in the proper file system. The Lumia 1520 has a 3,400 mAh battery and will be compatible with a US$99 DC-50 wireless-charging plate, with the phone itself to have a price of US$749.

Like the Lumia 1020 it takes a shareable 5Mpx picture and a 16Mpx picture that can only be accessed by attaching the handset into a PC, but only has 1/2.5" sensor size. Capable of 2x data binning lossless compression for taking photos and 4x for taking videos.

=== Model variants ===
Model	RM-937	RM-939	RM-938	RM-940
Countries	International	China	Latin America	United States
Carriers/Providers	International	China Unicom	Unlocked	AT&T
2G	Quad-band GSM/EDGE (850/900/1800/1900 MHz)			
3G	Quadband HSPA+ 1, 2, 5/6, 8 (850/900/1900/2100 MHz)		Pentaband HSPA+ 1, 4, 5/6, 8 (850/900/AWS/1900/2100 MHz) (Note: The RM-940 sold by AT&T does not ship with AWS HSPA+ connectivity support out of the box, but it can be obtained by using the official Lumia Denim update.)	
4G	Pentaband LTE 1, 3, 7, 8, 20 (800/900/1800/2100/2600 MHz) (For RM-939, flash RM-937 firmware will unlock LTE frequencies)		Pentaband LTE 2, 4, 5, 7, 17 (700/850/1700/1900/2100/2600 MHz)	Pentaband LTE 2, 4, 5, 7, 17 (700/850/1700/1900/2600 MHz)
Max network speed down/upload	LTE: 150/50 Mbit/s; DC-HSPA+: 42.2/5.76 Mbit/s			
Internal Storage	32 GB			16 GB / 32 GB
Wireless Charging	Built in (Qi)			Requires case (PMA)

== Reception ==
Tom Warren from The Verge has praised the phone for its display, speed and camera, but noted the lack of stylus support and its size makes it difficult to use one handed.

Andy Vandervell from TrustedReviews wrote: "The Lumia 1520 is a watershed phone in many respects. It brings Windows Phone hardware on par with the rest of the smartphone world, but the software still needs a bit of work."

Brad Molen from Engadget concludes: "The Lumia 1520 offers a Windows Phone experience unlike any we've seen before. With its top-notch hardware, fantastic imaging and constantly improving firmware, this is by far our favorite WP8 device."

== Awards ==
The Nokia Lumia 1520 won the GSM Arena's Smartphone Champions League in 2013. Nokia captured the first 3 places with the Nokia Lumia 1020 in second place and the Nokia Lumia 520 tied for third with the LG Nexus 5.

== Reported problems ==
Upon its release, the 1520 suffered from initial issues that had since been resolved. For example, early users reported a speaker overdrive issue with Windows Phone 8.1 version 5001. Users also reported random reboot issues, which Microsoft tried to address with a software update on 19 March 2014 to no avail but were able to resolve with an update on 19 June 2015.

One contentious issue was a supposed design flaw on the device's screen wherein the touch interface digitizer receives signals without user interaction on the touchscreen, resulting in "phantom touches".

== Gallery ==
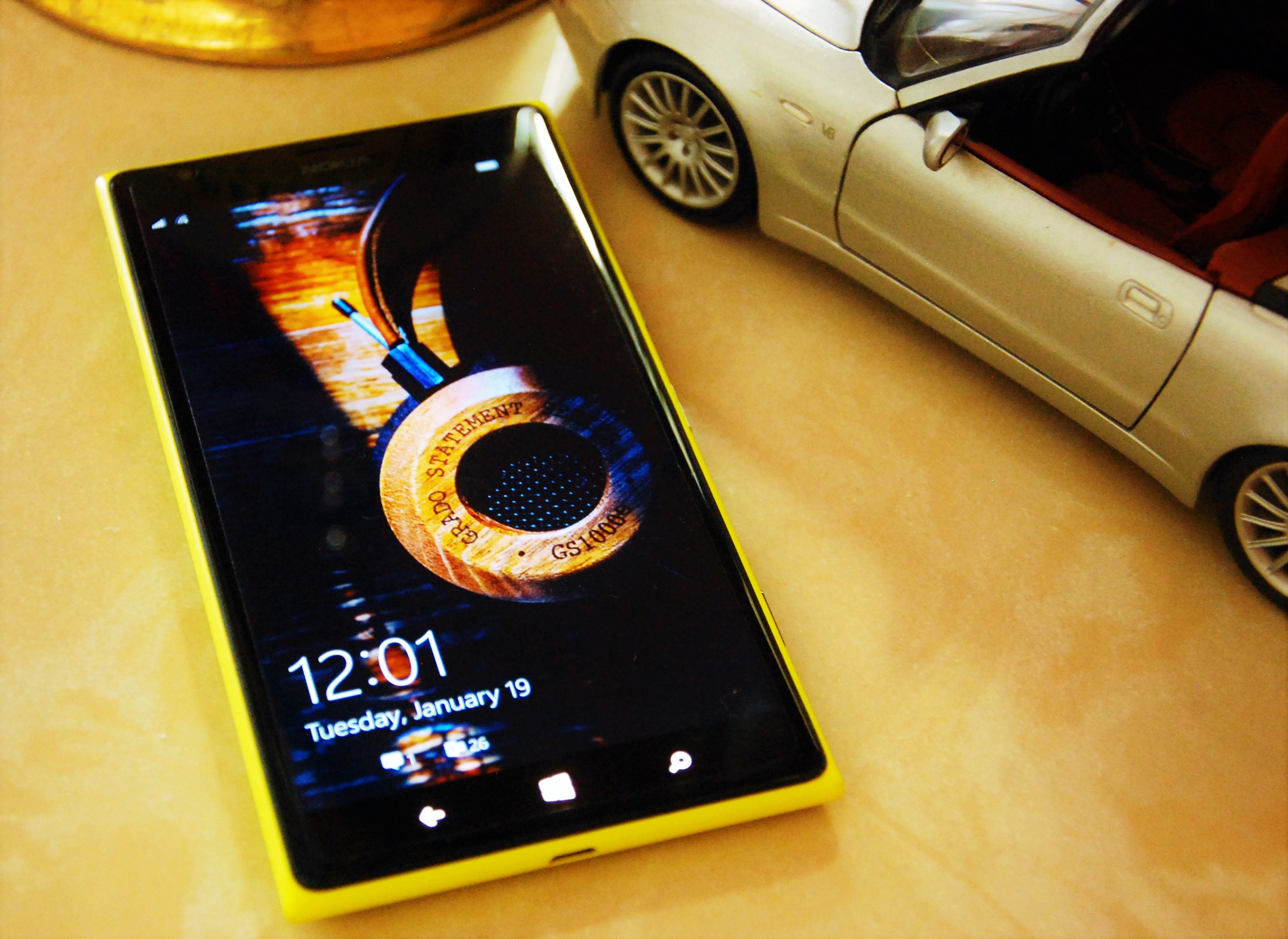
The Nokia Lumia 1520 next to a 1:18 scale model car for comparison.

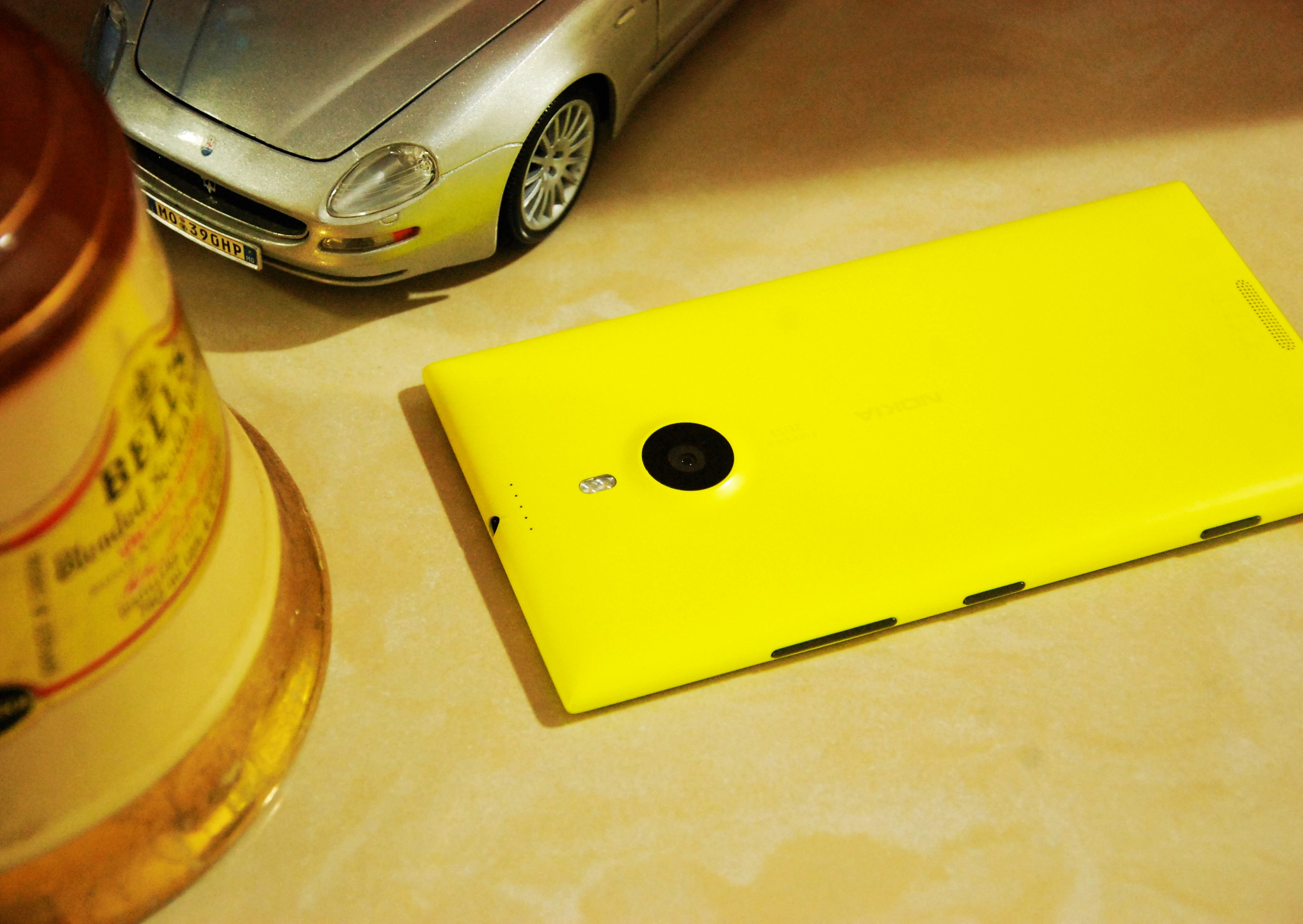
Reverse side of the Nokia Lumia 1520. Arrangement of the 3.5mm headphone jack, dual-LED flash, 21 megapixel Carl Zeiss Pureview camera, volume, power and camera buttons are clearly visible.

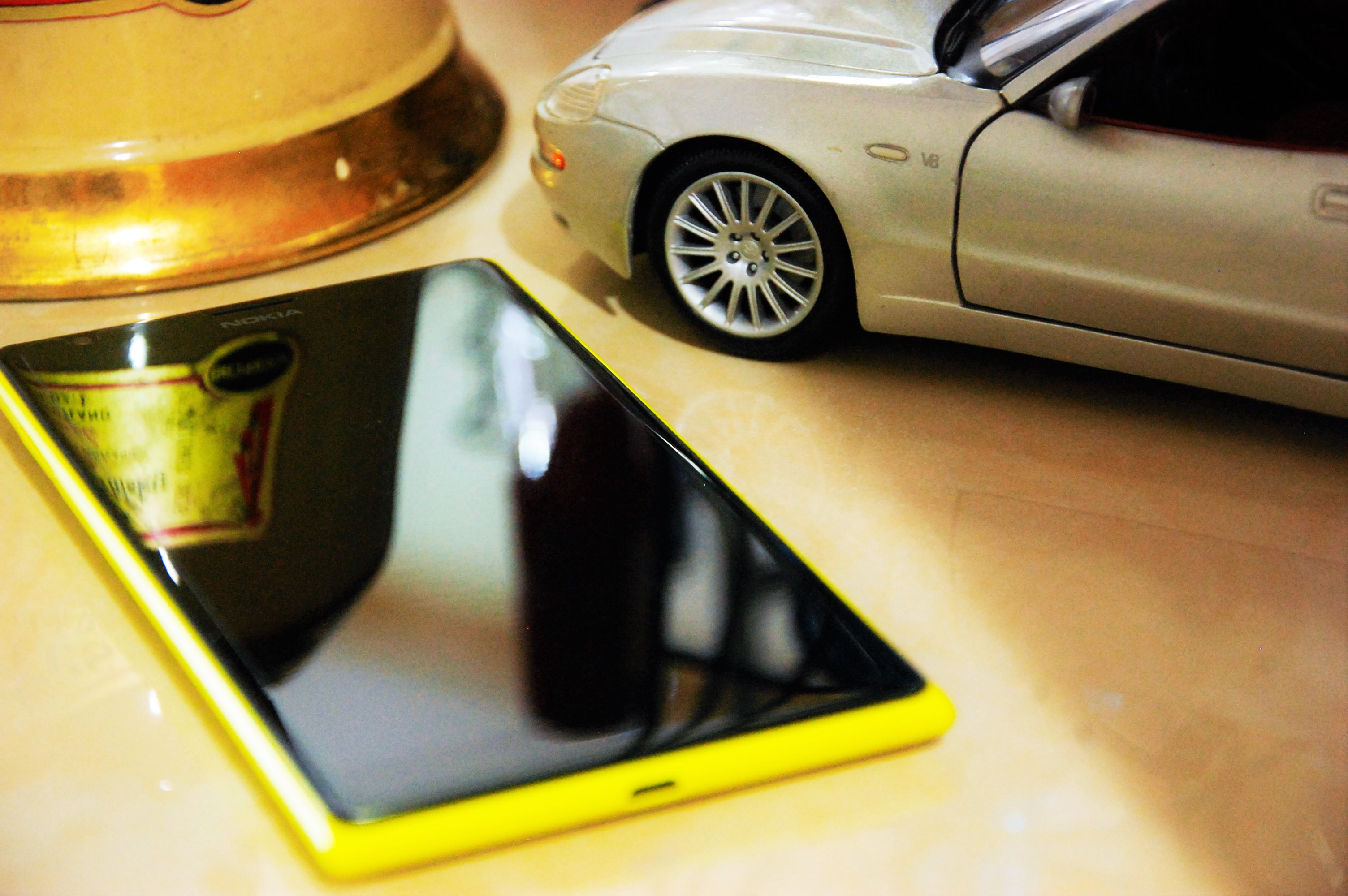
Picture of the Nokia Lumia 1520's FHD ClearBlack IPS display and backlit capacitive keys switched off.

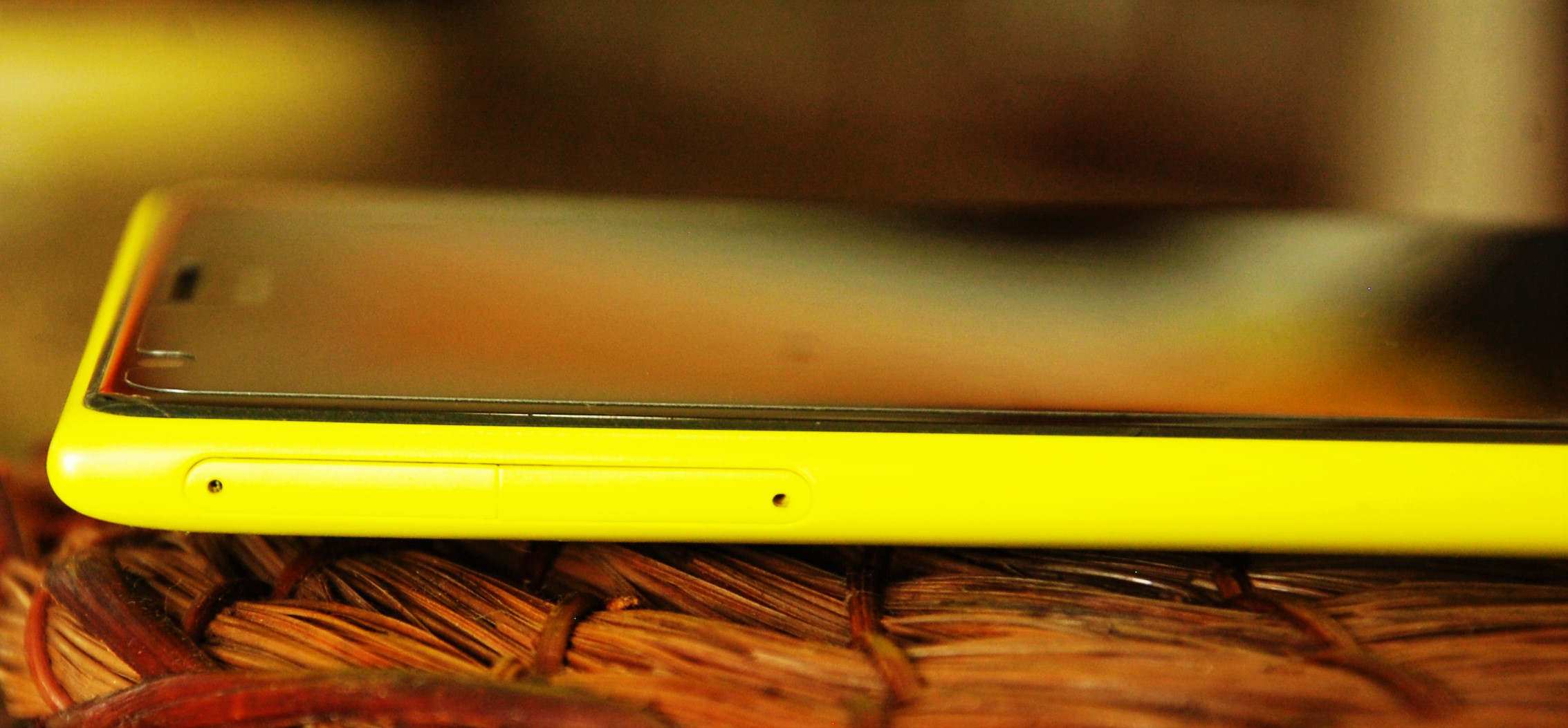
Detailed view of the Nokia Lumia 1520's Sim card and SD card slots.

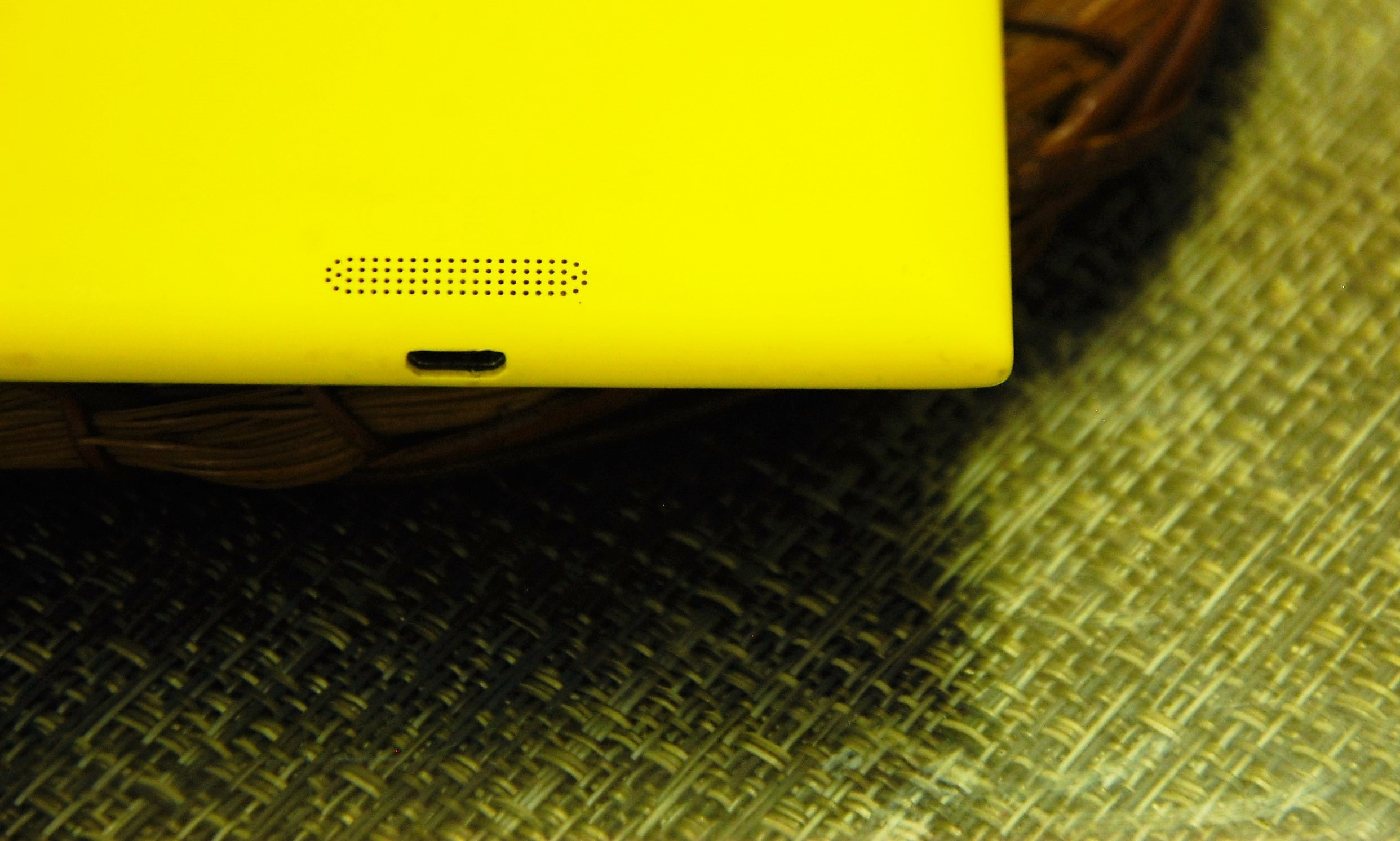
Detailed view of the Nokia Lumia 1520's speaker grille and micro USB port.

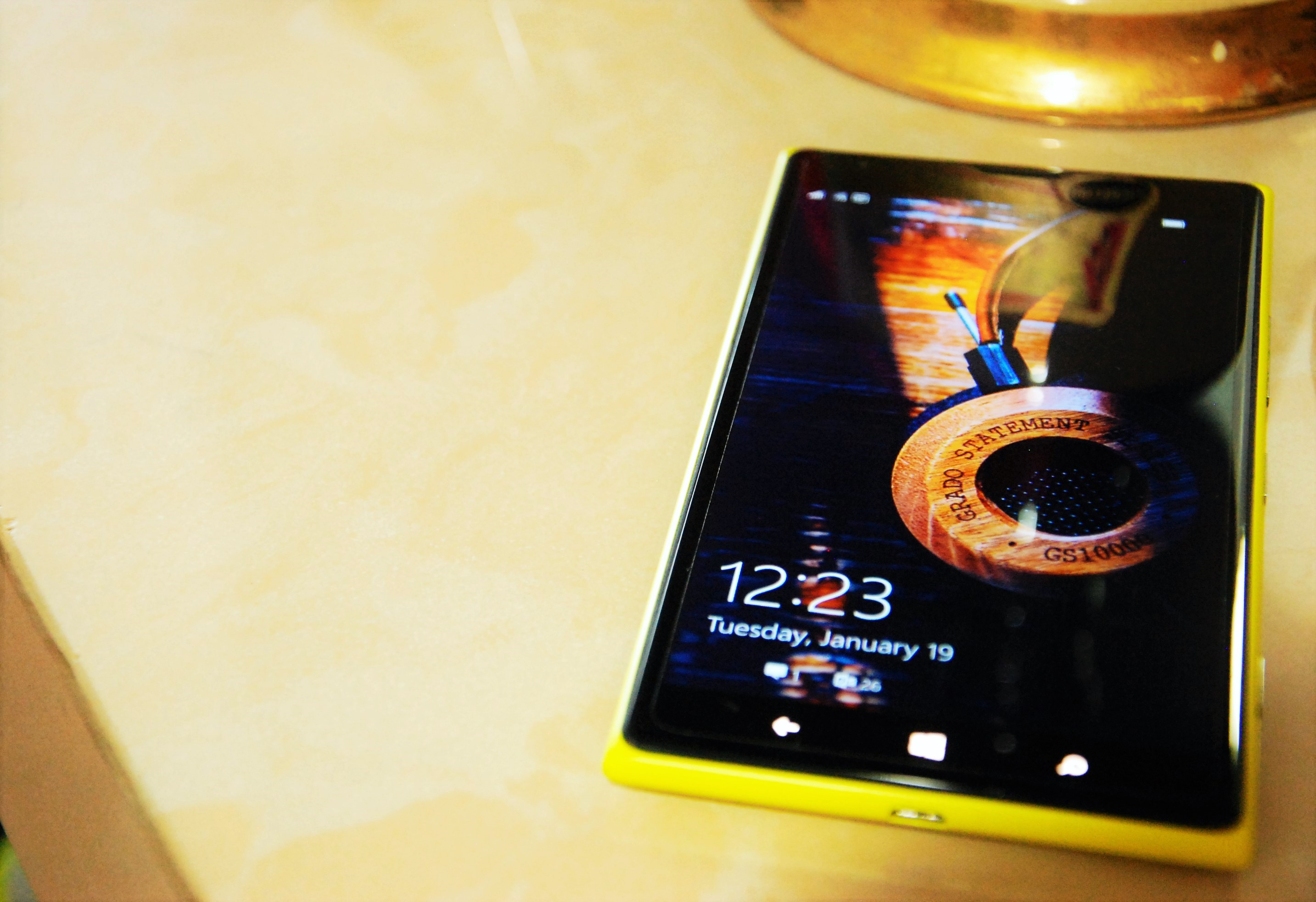
Yellow Nokia Lumia 1520

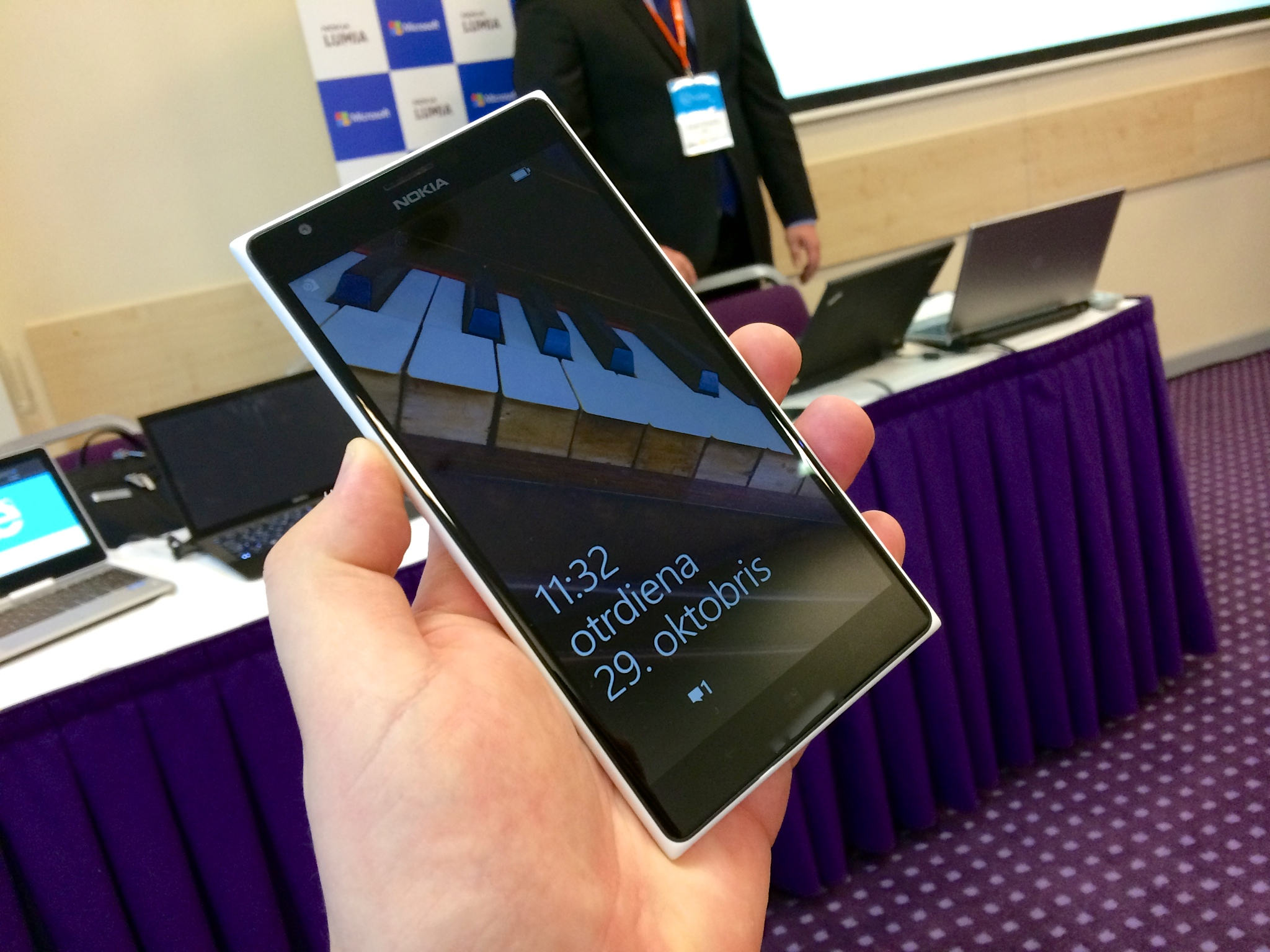
White Nokia Lumia 1520

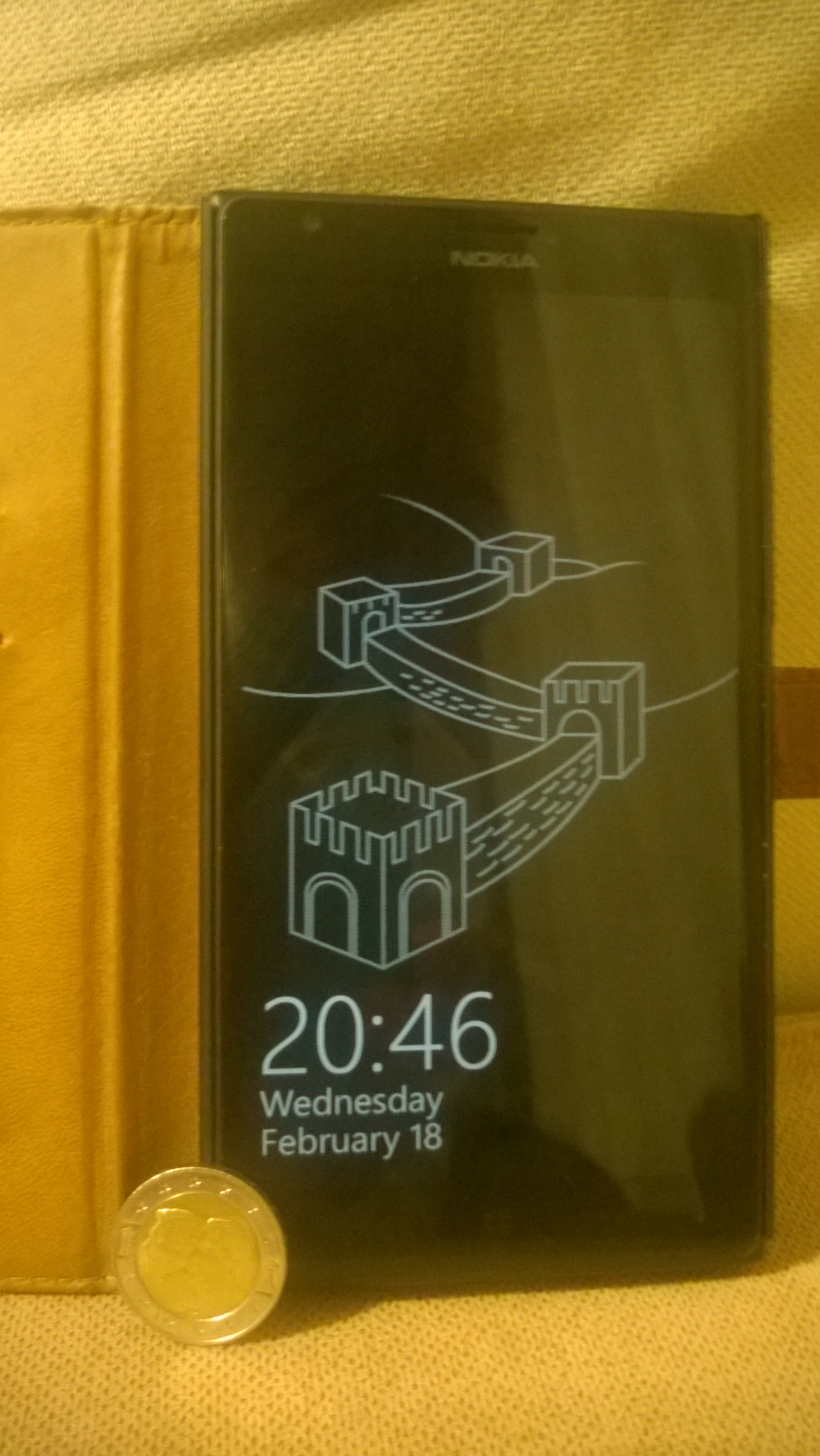
Comparison between the Nokia Lumia 1520 and a €2 coin.

== See also ==
- Microsoft Lumia
- Nokia Lumia 1320
