= Sakura (disambiguation) =

Sakura is the Japanese term for ornamental cherry blossom trees and their blossoms.

Sakura may also refer to:

== People ==
- Sakura (name), a name, usually Japanese (and list of individuals and fictional characters with that name)

== Places ==
- Sakura, Chiba (佐倉市), a city in Japan
- Sakura, Tochigi (さくら市), a city in Japan formed on March 28, 2005
- Sakura-ku, Saitama (桜区), a district in the city of Saitama, Japan
- Sakura Domain (佐倉藩), a Japanese feudal domain located in Shimōsa Province
- Sakura Square, a plaza in Denver, Colorado
- Sakuranobaba Josaien, a Japanese tourism facility located in Kumamoto City, Japan
- Sakura, Setagaya, Tokyo, a district in Setagaya Area

== Business ==
- Sakura (cigarette), produced and sold exclusively in Japan, by Japan Tobacco
- Sakura (train), several different train services in Japan
- The Sakura Bank, a Japanese bank based in Tokyo and Kobe
- Sakura Color Products Corporation, a Japanese pen manufacturer
- Tokyo Sakura Tram (officially the Toden Arakawa Line), a tram service in Tokyo, Japan
- Sakura Lounge, the airport lounge of Japan Airlines

== Music ==
=== Albums ===
- Sakura (Susumu Yokota album), 1999
- Sakura (Fariz RM album), 1980
- Sakura, a 1998 album by Southern All Stars

=== Songs ===
- "Sakura Sakura", a traditional Japanese song
- "Sakura" (Arashi song), 2015
- "Sakura" (Ayaka song), 2018
- "Sakura" (Ikimonogakari song), 2006
- "Sakura" (Lead song), 2014
- "Sakura" (Saori@destiny song), 2008
- Sakura-Variationen, a 2000 trio for saxophone, piano, and percussion by Helmut Lachenmann
- "Sakura", by Capsule, 2001
- "Sakura", by Da Pump, 2019
- "Sakura", by Ketsumeishi, 2005
- "Sakura", by Naotarō Moriyama, 2003
- "Sakura", by Nirgilis, used in the anime Eureka Seven, 2006
- "Sakura", by Rosalía from Motomami, 2022

== Sport ==
- Sakura, a common nickname for Japanese Women's national sports teams:
  - Japan women's national field hockey team
  - Japan women's national rugby union team

== Transportation ==
- Japanese ship Sakura list of ships named Sakura
- Datsun Sakura, a rebadged Nissan S110 Silvia for the Mexican market
- Nissan Sakura, a battery electric kei car

== Other uses ==
- Sakura (text editor)
- Sakura (TV series), a 2002 Japanese TV morning show drama
- Sakura catalog, a Japanese stamp catalog illustrated in colors
- Sakura Miku (桜ミク), a spring-themed seasonal variant of the virtual idol Hatsune Miku
- Sakura, raw horse meat in Japanese cuisine
- Racehorses owned by Sakura Commerce Co.
  - Sakura Bakushin O
  - Sakura Chitose O
  - Sakura Chiyono O
  - Sakura Laurel
  - Sakura Star O

== See also ==
- Cherry Blossom (disambiguation)
- Ōka (disambiguation)
