= Ōka (disambiguation) =

Ōka, Ohka, Ouka (おうか) or Ooka (おおか) may refer to:

- Ōka (桜花（おうか）), blossom of cherry tree
- Yokosuka MXY-7 Ohka (桜花（おうか）, Ōka), a Japanese kamikaze aircraft in World War II
- Ōka Station (相可（おうか）駅, Ōka-eki), a railway station
- Ōka (surname) (おうか or おおか), a Japanese surname

== See also ==
- Oka (disambiguation)
- Ōoka (disambiguation)
- Sakura (disambiguation)
- Cherry Blossom (disambiguation)
