= Princess Sakura =

Princess Sakura, Princess Cherry Blossom, Sakura Hime, Sakura-hime, or Sakurahime may refer to:

- Konohanasakuya-hime, a Shinto megami

== Fictional characters ==
- Princess Sakura, a protagonist of the manga series Tsubasa: Reservoir Chronicle
- Princess Tsubasa, also known as Princess Sakura, a recurring character in the manga series Tsubasa: Reservoir Chronicle
- Princess Sakura, a character in the manga series Flame of Recca
- Princess Sakura, the protagonist and titular character of the manga series Sakura Hime: The Legend of Princess Sakura
- Princess Cherry Blossom, a character in the video game Sakura Samurai: Art of the Sword
- Sakura, a character in video game Fire Emblem Fates

== See also ==
- Sakura (disambiguation)
