= Ōka (surname) =

Ōka, Ohka, Ouka (桜花（おうか）, Ōka, "cherry blossom"), Ooka (大家（おおか）, Ōka, "big house") as a surname may refer to:

- Tomo Ohka (大家友和, Ōka Tomokazu) (born 1976), a Major League Baseball player
- Yumi Ohka (桜花由美, Ōka Yumi) (born 1979), a Japanese professional wrestler

== See also ==
- Oka (surname)
- Ōoka (disambiguation)
