= Heart Up =

Single by Ayaka and Daichi Miura
- Released: February 14, 2018
- Genre: Pop
- Length: 4:52
- Label: A Station
- Songwriter: Ayaka
- Producer: Takeshi Kobayashi

Ayaka singles chronology
"Sakura" (2018)	"Heart Up" (2018)

Daichi Miura singles chronology
"Futsū no Kon'ya no Koto o (Let Tonight Be Forever Remembered)" (2017)	"Heart Up" (2018)

Audio sample
- "Heart Up": file; help

"Heart Up" (ハートアップ, Hāto Appu) is a song recorded by Japanese singer-songwriter Ayaka and Japanese singer Daichi Miura. It was released as a single by A Station on Valentine's Day, February 14, 2018. The song was written by Ayaka and produced by Takeshi Kobayashi. "Heart Up" was used in television ads for Tokyo Metro's Find My Tokyo campaign, starring actress Satomi Ishihara. The song also served as the theme song for the February 2018 broadcasts of the AX morning show Sukkiri. The CD single was released in standard CD-only and CD/DVD versions.

== Background and composition ==
In April 2017, Ayaka, Miura and Kobayashi met up to discuss creating a song for a nationwide television ad campaign. Over the summer, Ayaka and Kobayashi wrote and arranged a rough demo of the song, which they then sent to Miura. On September 8, 2017, after having performed together at the 908 Festival 2017, organized by Kreva, Ayaka and Miura gathered in studio to record the vocal track and Kobayashi then completed the arrangement for the song. Ayaka describes the song as being about "overcoming the bittersweet nature of love and rising up from heartbreak".

== Chart performance ==
"Heart Up" entered the daily Oricon Singles Chart at number 23, and peaked at number 17. The single debuted at number 23 on the weekly Oricon Singles Chart, with 5,000 copies sold. On the Oricon Digital Singles Chart, "Heart Up" debuted at number 9, with 14,000 downloads sold.

== Track listing ==
All tracks are written by Ayaka.

No.	Title	Arranger(s)	Length
1.	"Heart Up" (ハートアップ Hāto Appu)	Takeshi Kobayashi	4:52
2.	"Heart Up" (Karaoke Version with Ayaka Vocal)	Kobayashi	4:52
3.	"Heart Up" (Karaoke Version with Daichi Miura Vocal)	Kobayashi	4:52
4.	"Heart Up" (Instrumental)	Kobayashi	4:52
Total length:			19:30

Heart Up DVD
No.	Title	Length
1.	"Heart Up" (Music Video)	4:54
Total length:		4:54

== Charts ==
Chart (2018)	Peak position
Japan Weekly Singles (Oricon)	23
Japan Weekly Digital Singles (Oricon)	9
Japan Hot 100 (Billboard)	10
Japan Download Songs (Billboard)	9
Japan Streaming Songs (Billboard)	8
Japan Top Singles Sales (Billboard)	25
Japan Weekly Singles (RecoChoku)	7
Japan Weekly Singles (Mora)	10

== Sales ==
Region	Certification	Certified units/sales
Japan	—	28,969
