= Liquid optically clear adhesive =

Bonding technology in display devices

Liquid optically-clear adhesive (LOCA) is liquid-based bonding technology used in touch panels and display devices to bind the cover lens, plastic, or other optical materials to the main sensor unit or each other. These adhesives improve optical characteristics and durability. LOCA glue is often hardened using ultraviolet light.

Primary advantages of LOCA compared to other adhesives are its:

- Re-workability
- Adhesion to non-even surfaces
- Superior optical properties
- Durability

LOCA follows traditional die-cut film adhesives, also known as optically clear adhesives (OCA tape). LOCA also allows for thinner designs and new technologies, such as the use of silicone, that improve the properties of the final product.

== Overview ==
Optical bonding, including LOCA and non-liquid OCA tape, are used in a wide range of electronic equipment, especially those with touch panels. The adhesive bonds the touch panel to the main liquid crystal display, and also bonds any protective cover, such as the lens, to the touch panel. After application, the adhesive is cured onto the device through ultraviolet light (UV), heat, moisture, or a combination, depending on the manufacturer and specifications. Major applications include capacitive touch panels, 3D televisions (3D TV), and glass retarders.

Optical bonding improves optical performance of displays. It eliminates the air gap between the cover glass and LCD, and usually includes an anti-reflective (A/R) coating (as well as anti-smudge and anti-glare treatments on the cover glass). Optical bonding improves the contrast ratio by reducing the amount of reflected light, thus improving viewability. This is especially important in outdoor applications, where direct sunlight can decrease viewability.

Fresnel reflections from the glass as well as the adhesive can degrade LCD viewability. Reflection is caused by an impedance mismatch between air and the glass. The reflection makes the white brighter, but dilutes black and other colors, which decreases contrast. LOCA suppliers aim to match the refractive index of glass and clear plastic PMMA (refractive index approximately 1.5) used in displays to minimize loss. LOCA suppliers such as Momentive Materials and Henkel report an increased contrast of 400% in sunlight through the use of LOCA with anti-reflective glass, vastly improving the viewing experience.

Besides the optical advantages, bonding a sheet of glass to the LCD also improves display durability. It can resist scratches, condensation, and has an improved operating temperature range. As touchpad devices become ubiquitous in consumer markets, this increased ruggedness becomes even more important. Also, reducing light loss due to reflection extends battery life, as the device can use less backlight.

== LOCA advantages ==
LOCA has many advantages compared to traditional non-liquid film type adhesives (OCA tape). Specifically, it:

- Is suitable for application on uneven surfaces
- Can be repaired and adjusted once cured
- Can be used in large panels
- Is completely size-independent, while OCA tape must be pre die-cut
- Has high adhesion
- Ideal for filling gaps because it is a liquid
- Does not suffer condensation and fogging
- Resists extreme temperatures
- Requires less surface preparation
- Is contaminant-free, resulting in improved bubble resistance in laminations exposed to high temperature and humidity
- Can be applied by automated process
- Accommodates thinner and lighter display designs
- Facilitates faster development of new products and designs

== Applications ==
LOCA is generally used in displays and touch panel applications. Application is expected to increase as mobile devices, televisions, tablets, monitors and laptops migrate to touch interfaces. Although there are many varied applications, Henkel divides the applications into three categories:

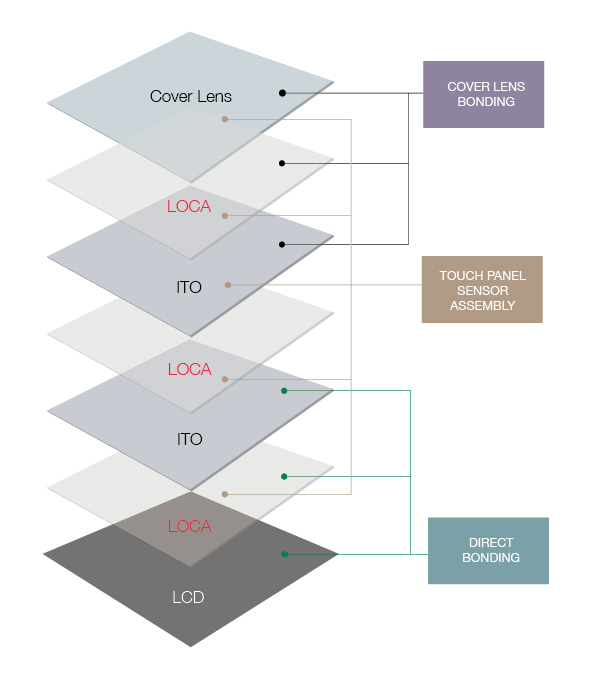
Three common applications of LOCA

Touch panel sensor assembly
To bond touch panel sensors that require two layers of ITO (indium-tin-oxide) coated glass. This type of bonding will eventually be replaced by direct bonding.
Cover lens bonding
To fill the air gap in touch panel sensors that use a cover lens (such as clear plastic PMMA) and the glass touch panel sensor.
Direct bonding
To achieve the highest amount of contrast, such as in an outdoor viewing application, it is necessary to "directly bond" the cover lens to the LCD module.

== Use of silicone technology ==
While traditional adhesive chemistry relies on acrylic-based liquid, new technologies include silicone. Silicone provides new methods for curing the adhesive. The following table illustrates the difference between acrylic and silicone in single and double curing processes.

Curing process	Acrylic	Silicone
Single cure	UV only	Snap cure, UV cure
Dual cure	UV + heat	UV + moisture

The curing process and inherent low modulus of silicone LOCA also helps reduce the amount of haze around the edges of large LCD screens. Silicone technology reduces shrinkage on substrates to less than 1% on larger displays, where acrylic technologies tend to be around 3–5%, depending on display size.

== Equipment ==
Dispensing equipment usually includes bubble free dispensers by means of a bottle or cartridge.

Curing equipment usually includes UV curing lamps or spot cure systems. Major suppliers of LOCA generally offer both dispensing and curing equipment.
