= Tokko Original Soundtrack =

Soundtrack album by Various artists
- Released: June 28, 2006
- Genre: Electronic
- Length: 1:09:26
- Label: Universal Music Japan

Tokko Original Soundtrack is the soundtrack to the 2006 anime series Tokko. It was released in stores across Japan on June 28, 2006, in conjunction with the anime's broadcast. It does not include the opening and ending themes. Artists such as No Milk, Nude Jazz, Aoki Takamasa, Heprcam, DJ Baku, Numb, Koji Sekiguchi, and Danchambo collaborated to create the soundtrack album.

== Track listing ==
No.	Title	Artist	Length
1.	"Mysterious People"	No Milk	5:48
2.	"Cannibal-Danchzma"	DJ Baku	4:06
3.	"集合的無意識"	Numb	1:23
4.	"Candle"	Danchambo	15:53
5.	"Chase in the Acid City"	No Milk	6:50
6.	"覚醒 (Kakusei)"	Koji Sekiguchi	5:54
7.	"Outformation"	Nude Jazz	7:54
8.	"Mind Controller"	Nude Jazz	2:37
9.	"Dark Corridor"	Aoki Takamasa	7:46
10.	"Elm"	Heprcam	5:43
11.	"Hope which isn't seen yet."	No Milk	5:32
