= Hélène Courtois =

French astrophysicist

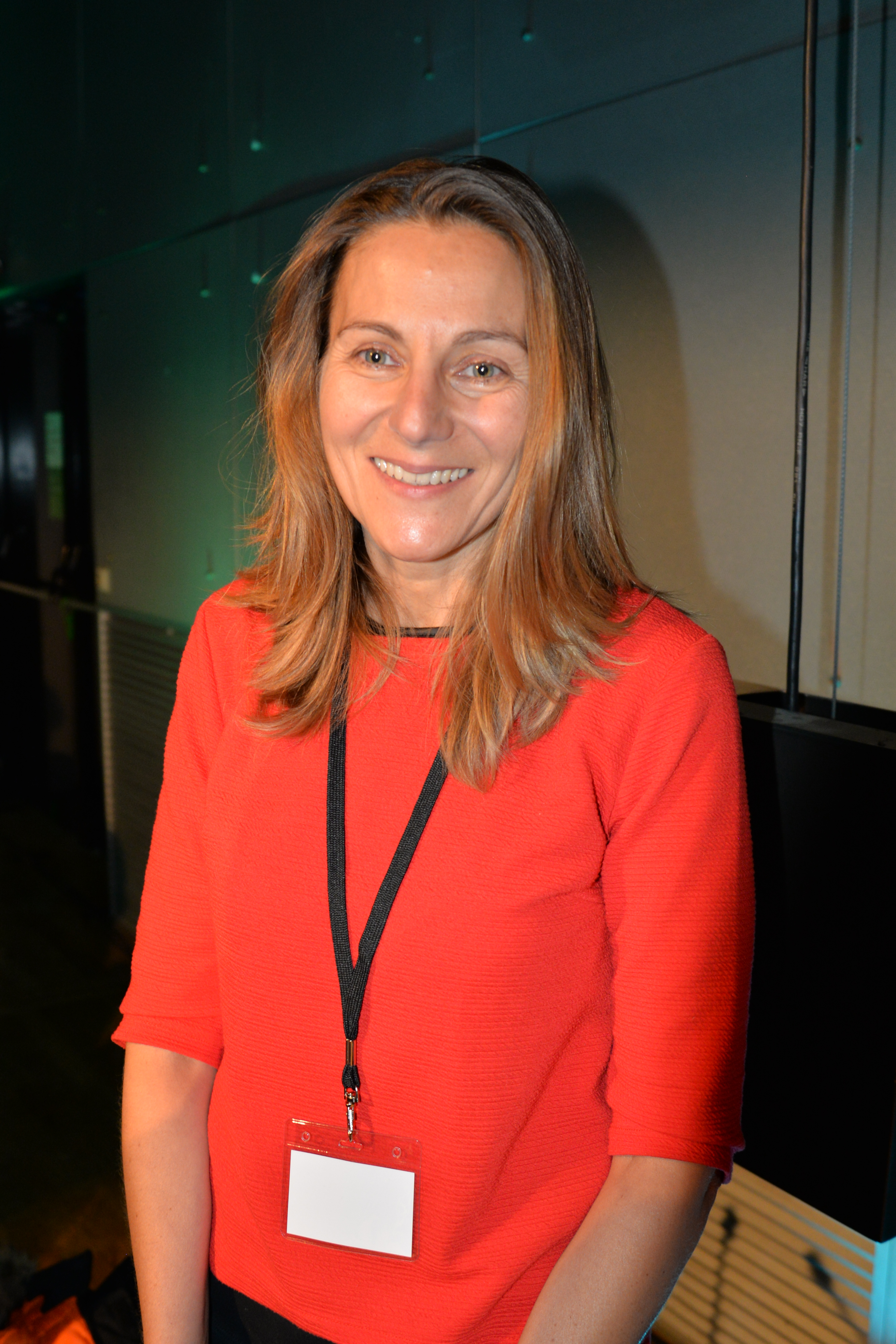
- Courtois in 2016
- Born: Hélène Di Nella; 1970 (age 55–56)
- Education: University of Grenoble 1
- Known for: Laniakea Supercluster
- Awards: Legion of Honour - Knight (2020) Order of the Academic Palms - Knight (2015) Order of the Arts and letters - Knight (2023)
- Scientific career
- Fields: Astrophysics
- Workplaces: University of Lyon 1
- Thesis: Structure et cinématique de l'univers local (1995)
- Doctoral advisor: Georges Paturel

Hélène Courtois, (French pronunciation: [elɛn kuʁtwa]; born 1970) née Di Nella, is a French astrophysicist specialising in cosmography. She is a professor at the University of Lyon 1 and was elected knight in the Legion of Honour, in the order of the Academic palms and in the order of the Arts and Letters. She holds a senior distinguished research position at the Institut Universitaire de France since 2015.

She conducts her research at the Lyon Institut de Physique des 2 Infinis (IP2I)—formerly the Institute of Nuclear Physics (IPNL)—and was co-director of two international teams (Cosmic Flows and CLUES), she is best known for her investigations into the dynamic cosmography of the Universe. Her work has concentrated on the distribution of matter in the large-scale structure of the Universe. In 2006, she participated in the confirmation of the acceleration in the expansion of the Universe via the study of supernovae. In 2014, she proposed a redefinition of the notion of galactic superclusters, and identified the Laniakea Supercluster, an agglomeration that is bigger than the Virgo Supercluster by a factor of 100. In 2017, she showed that cosmic voids produce a repulsive effect resulting in galactic displacements; this may also explain the cold spot in the cosmic microwave background. In 2023 she mapped the five neighbouring superclusters of Lanikea. An asteroid from the principal belt was named Helenecourtois (1998 OY3) in honour of her career.

== Early life and education ==
Hélène Di Nella was born in 1970. She obtained a PhD (doctorate) from the University of Grenoble 1 in 1995, with her thesis titled Structure and kinematics of the Local Universe.

== Career ==
=== Research work ===
Courtois began her research into the large-scale structure of our cosmic neighbourhood in the early 1990s while at the Lyon Observatory. In 1994, she revealed a superstructure comprising 27,000 galaxies, with a radius of about 290 million light-years. By studying the distribution of thousands of galaxies and modelling their structures, her team showed that these galaxies were not spherically distributed in space, but instead created a shape like a squashed football or a silkworm cocoon.

Courtois and her team have studied the convergent behaviour of the galaxies of the Laniakea supercluster. By modelling the movement of galaxies as though they were streams in a watershed or basin, they were able to map out the boundaries of this local agglomeration. They have adapted the technique to model the Vela Supercluster, which was discovered in 2016. They used their data to compute the flow rate of the galaxies towards the 'centre', thereby making it possible to infer the masses of the galaxies. Using this information, they will be able to determine the shape and size of the Vela supercluster.

In 2017, Courtois revealed two discoveries: one, called the Dipole repeller, and the other, on the cosmic microwave background cold spot, which could potentially explain the propagation of our galaxy through space at about 2 million kilometres per hour.

In 2019, her team released a new map of the local universe, encompassing a volume 10 times larger than that released in 2014.

In 2023, she is elected knight in the order of Arts and Letters.

In 2023, she co-publishes in Nature, that galaxies located in cosmic voids have a peculiar star formation history. Continuously enlarging the cosmography, she published the same year the discovery of the five neighbouring superclusters of Laniakea.

She has published more than 250 refereed articles.

=== Scientific administration ===
In the 2000s, Courtois led the cosmology team at the Lyon Observatory. In 2006, she set up the research programme Cosmic Flows. Its major result has been the discovery of the frontiers of the supercluster named Laniakea that defines our cosmic neighbourhood.

She has been the head of the IP2I Observational Cosmology / Euclid research group. It is one of the world leaders in the field of cosmology dedicated to the observation, analysis and digital reproduction of the distribution and dynamics of dark matter and galaxies in the nearby universe.

Courtois oversaw the creation of a comprehensive programme of university studies in the sciences of the universe, hosting annually more than 500 students from University of Lyon 1. Courtois has been an expert adviser at the European Commission for research and education programmes in physics and astrophysics since 2009. She is also a patron of the Vaulx-en-Velin planetarium.

Courtois has been vice-president of the University Lyon 1 for 9 years (2016-2025), specializing in international relations.

== Honours ==
In 2015, Courtois was named a senior member of the Institut Universitaire de France and was made a Knight in the Order of the Academic palms. She also received a festival prize for her film Cartographier l'univers : à la découverte de Laniakea.

From 2016 to 2025 she was vice-president of the University of Lyon 1, specialized in international relations.

Her book Voyage sur les flots de galaxies won the 2017 Prix Ciel & Espace du livre d'astronomie. In 2017, she was ranked in the top 50 most influential French personalities by Vanity Fair.

In 2018, she received the "Eureka" prize for science communication. She was also elected as the most influential French Scientist of the year by the Foreign affairs ministry.

In 2019, she was nominated in the top 3 of the 50 most influential women in her home city, Lyon.

In 2020, Courtois was made a Knight of the Legion of honour.

In 2023, she was made a Knight in the order of the Arts and Letters.

== Selected works ==
=== Articles ===
- Di Nella, Hélène; Couch, W.; Paturel, G.; Parker, Q. (1 November 1996). "Are the Perseus—Pisces chain and the Pavo—Indus wall connected?". Monthly Notices of the Royal Astronomical Society. 283 (2): 367–380. arXiv:astro-ph/9611211. Bibcode:1996MNRAS.283..367D. doi:10.1093/mnras/283.2.367.
- Paturel, G; Andernach, H.; Di Nella, H. (July 1997). "Extragalactic database VII. Reduction of astrophysical parameters". Astronomy and Astrophysics Supplement Series. 124 (1). Astron. Astrophys. Suppl. Ser.: 109–122. arXiv:astro-ph/9806140. Bibcode:1997A&AS..124..109P. doi:10.1051/aas:1997354. S2CID 17023933.
- Paturel, Georges; Di Nella, Hélène; Terry, Jean-Noël; Theureau, Gilles (1998). "Interpretation of the galaxy structure surrounding the Local Supercluster". Comptes Rendus de l'Académie des Sciences, Série IIB. 326 (12): 933–938. arXiv:astro-ph/9807171. Bibcode:1998CRASB.326..933P. doi:10.1016/S1251-8069(99)80051-9. S2CID 119372191.
- Tully, R. Brent; Shaya, Edward J.; Karachentsev, Igor D.; Courtois, Hélène M.; Kocevski, Dale D.; Rizzi, Luca; Peel, Alan (March 2008). "Our Peculiar Motion Away from the Local Void". The Astrophysical Journal. 676 (1): 184–205. arXiv:0705.4139. Bibcode:2008ApJ...676..184T. doi:10.1086/527428. S2CID 14738309.
- Courtois, Hélène; Pomarède, Daniel; Tully, R. Brent; Hoffman, Yehuda; Courtois, Denis (14 August 2013). "Cosmography of the Local Universe". The Astronomical Journal. 146 (3): 69. arXiv:1306.0091. Bibcode:2013AJ....146...69C. doi:10.1088/0004-6256/146/3/69. S2CID 118625532.
- Tully, R. Brent; Courtois, Hélène; Hoffman, Yehuda; Pomarède, Daniel (4 September 2014). "The Laniakea supercluster of galaxies". Nature. 513 (7516): 71–73. arXiv:1409.0880. Bibcode:2014Natur.513...71T. doi:10.1038/nature13674. PMID 25186900. S2CID 205240232.
- Hoffman, Yehuda; Pomarède, Daniel; Tully, R. Brent; Courtois, Hélène (30 January 2017). "The dipole repeller". Nature Astronomy. 1 (2): 0036. arXiv:1702.02483. Bibcode:2017NatAs...1E..36H. doi:10.1038/s41550-016-0036. S2CID 7537393.

=== Books ===
- Courtois, Hélène (2016). Voyage sur les flots de galaxies - Laniakea, notre nouvelle adresse dans l'Univers. Dunod. ISBN 978-2100738908.
- Courtois, Hélène; Acker, Agnès (2016). Astrophysique - Rappels de cours, exercices et problèmes corrigés. Dunod. ISBN 978-2100742240.
- Tognini, Michel; Courtois, Hélène (2019). Explorateurs de l'espace. Dunod. ISBN 978-2100781607.
- Courtois, Helene (2019). Finding Our Place in the Universe. Cambridge, Massachusetts: MIT. ISBN 9780262039956.
- Galaxy Mapper : The Luminous Discoveries of Astrophysicist Hélène Courtois by Allie Summers, Sian James (illustrations) (2025) MIT Kid press. ISBN 9781536228977
