= Joseph Fourier University =

French university (1970–2015)

- Université Joseph Fourier
- Type: Public university
- Active: 1970–2015
- President: Patrick Lévy
- Academic staff: 1,500
- Administrative staff: 1,500
- Students: 16,710
- Location: Grenoble, France; 45°11′30″N 5°46′22.72″E
- Website: www.ujf-grenoble.fr

Joseph Fourier University (UJF, French: Université Joseph-Fourier, also known as Grenoble I or as Université Scientifique et Médicale de Grenoble) was a French university situated in the city of Grenoble and focused on the fields of sciences, technologies and health. It is now part of the Université Grenoble Alpes.

== Importance ==
According to the 2009 ARWU, Joseph Fourier University is the sixth best university in France. Joseph Fourier University is also the fourth best university in Engineering & IT nationally and 115th globally in QS World University Rankings. The origins of this scientific university can be traced all the way back to 1811 when the scientist Joseph Fourier established a faculty of science in Grenoble.

Part of the university is the Observatoire des Sciences de l'Univers de Grenoble (OSUG), a leading institution in the field of earth, space and environmental sciences.

The university was at the origin of the Joint Universities Accelerator School (JUAS), together with CERN and ESRF, in the early 1990s.

== Facilities ==
The main facilities are located on a vast campus east of Grenoble, on the commune of Saint-Martin d'Hères (and partially on that of Gières). This campus is shared with other higher education organizations, see University of Grenoble. The university also has teaching and research installations in the city of Grenoble proper.

The university runs many laboratories, many in association with CNRS, Grenoble-INP and other major institutions.

UJF also maintains the Jardin botanique alpin du Lautaret alpine garden on the Lautaret pass, in association with CNRS.

== Notable alumni ==
- Claire Berger, physicist
- Alim-Louis Benabid, Breakthrough prize, Life Science (2015)
- Yves Bréchet, Material Science
- Rajaâ Cherkaoui El Moursli, physicist, member of the "Académie Hassan II des Sciences et Techniques"
- Hélène Courtois, astrophysicist
- Charles Elachi, director of the Jet Propulsion Lab (NASA)
- Park Geun-hye, former president of South Korea
- Ariane Mézard, mathematician
- Vera Lúcia de Miranda Guarda, human rights activist and Brazilian UNESCO chairperson
- Sakura Pascarelli, physicist
- Rammal Rammal, a Lebanese condensed matter physicist
- Francisco Santos, mathematician
- Joseph Sifakis, computer scientist and Turing Award recipient (2007)
- Bruno Georges Pollet, chemist
