= Japanese ship Sakura =

Several naval ships of Japan have been named Sakura (桜（櫻） / さくら; "cherry blossom"):

- Japanese destroyer Sakura (1911), lead ship of her class of the Imperial Japanese Navy during World War I
- Japanese destroyer Sakura (1944), a Matsu-class destroyer of the Imperial Japanese Navy during World War II
- JDS Sakura (PF-290), a Kusu-class patrol frigate of the Japan Maritime Self-Defense Force, formerly USS Carson City (PF-50)
- JS Sakura, lead ship of her class of offshore patrol vessels of the Japan Maritime Self-Defense Force

== See also ==
- Sakura (disambiguation)
- Sakura-class destroyer, a class of destroyers of the Imperial Japanese Navy
- Sakura-class patrol ship, a class of offshore patrol vessels of the Japan Maritime Self-Defense Force
