= Ariane Mézard =

French mathematician

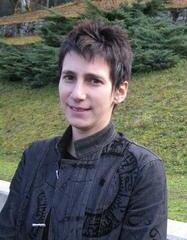
- Mézard in 2008
- Education: Joseph Fourier University; École normale supérieure de Lyon
- Scientific career
- Fields: Mathematics
- Workplaces: Sorbonne University; École normale supérieure (Paris)
- Thesis: Quelques problèmes de déformations en caractéristique mixte (1998)
- Doctoral advisor: Roland Gillard

Ariane Mézard is a French mathematician and a professor of mathematics at Sorbonne University who works in arithmetic geometry.

== Education ==
Mézard studied at the École normale supérieure de Lyon from 1992 to 1996. She received her Ph.D. under the supervision of Roland Gillard at Joseph Fourier University in 1998. She received her habilitation in 2005 during her time at Paris-Sud University.

== Career ==
Mézard worked as a postdoc at the Mathematical Sciences Research Institute and Regensburg University in 1999 and 2000 respectively. She was an assistant professor at Paris-Sud University from 2000 to 2006 and also served in the same role at École normale supérieure from 2005 to 2006. From 2006 to 2012, she was a professor at Versailles Saint-Quentin-en-Yvelines University. Since 2012, Mézard has been a professor of mathematics at Sorbonne University. Since 2016, she has worked as a part-time professor at the École normale supérieure.

== Recognition ==
From 2010 to 2015, Mézard was a junior member of the Institut Universitaire de France (IUF). At the time of her appointment to the IUF, she was one of only two women out of its fifty mathematician members. In 2018, she received the Fulbright for the Future Prize from the Fulbright Association.
