= OCA =

OCA or Oca may refer to:

== Places and jurisdictions ==
- The ancient town and bishopric Oca in Asia Minor (present Asia Turkey), now a Latin Catholic titular see
- The former Spanish Oca, modern Villafranca Montes de Oca, also see of a medieval bishopric (Auca), now a Latin Catholic titular see
- Oca (river), a tributary of the Ebro, Spain, having its source in the comarca of Montes de Oca
- Côte d'Azur Observatory, French name: Observatoire de la Côte d'Azur
- Cerro Armazones Observatory
- Orange County Airport, several airports in the United States
- Oregon Coast Aquarium
- Iruña de Oca, Spanish municipality

== Business and society ==
- Odisha Cricket Association, state cricket body of BCCI
- Open Content Alliance, consortium of organizations contributing to a publicly accessible archive of digitized texts
- Optimum currency area, geographical region which efficiently shares a single currency
- Oregon Citizens Alliance, conservative Christian political activist organization
- Organic Consumers Association, consumer protection and organic agriculture advocacy group
- Organization of Chinese Americans, national Asian Pacific American social and civic organization
- Oxford Conservative Association, student political organisation at the University of Oxford

== Education ==
- Oakland Charter Academy, a member school of Amethod Public Schools
- Ontario College of Art, former name for OCAD University
- Open College of the Arts

== Government ==
- Court of Appeal for Ontario, frequently referred to as the Ontario Court of Appeal
- Office of Consumer Affairs (Canada), government agency of Industry Canada
- Olympic Council of Asia, governing body of sports in Asia
- Organised and Financial Crime Agency of New Zealand, formerly known as the Organised Crime Agency
- Organized Crime Agency of British Columbia (1999–2004), predecessor of the Combined Forces Special Enforcement Unit
- Original Classification Authority
- Outback Communities Authority, an authority providing municipal services to communities in Outback South Australia

== Medicine ==
- OCA1, a gene associated with oculocutaneous albinism
- Oculocutaneous albinism, a form of albinism involving the eyes and skin
- ortho-Chloroamphetamine, an amphetamine

== Religion ==
- Orthodox Church in America, autocephalous Eastern Orthodox Church in North America
- Oxford Capacity Analysis, also known as the American Personality Analysis, a personality test used in Scientology

== Technology ==
- Odoo Community Association, an organization supporting the Odoo (formerly OpenERP) community
- Open Control Architecture, network control protocol for audio and video devices (AES70)
- Optically Clear Adhesives, bonding agents used for light-emitting devices like OLED and LEC; see Liquid optically clear adhesive
- Oracle Certified Associate, a level of the Oracle Certification Program

== Other uses ==
- Oca (structure), a kind of Brazilian indigenous dwelling
- Oxalis tuberosa, a South American tuber known as oca in Spanish
- Offensive counter air, military term
- Old Croton Aqueduct, especially when referring to the hiking trail
- Open coloring axiom in mathematics
- Operation Crossroads Africa, a volunteer organization
- Optical clearing agent, substance used in microscopy to make samples transparent
- Orange County Astronomers, an amateur astronomy club based in Orange County, California

== See also ==
- Oka
