= Cherry Blossom (disambiguation) =

Cherry blossom or Sakura is the blossom of cherry trees, genus Prunus.

Cherry blossom or Cherry blossoms may also refer to:

== Music ==
- Cherry Blossom (album), a 2020 album by the Vamps
- "Cherry Blossom" (Seiko Matsuda song), a 1981 song by Seiko Matsuda.
- "Cherry Blossom", a song by Kacey Musgraves on her album Star-Crossed
- "Cherry Blossoms", a song by Joe Satriani on his album What Happens Next

== Other uses ==
- Cherry Blossoms (film), a 2008 German film directed by Doris Dörrie
- Cherry Blossoms (marriage agency), a marriage agency
- Sakura (cigarette), Japanese cigarettes produced by Japan Tobacco
- Cherry Blossoms, nickname for the Japan national rugby union team
- Cherry Blossom (candy), a type of chocolate bar produced by Hershey Canada Inc
- A brand of British shoe polish made by Grangers International Ltd

== See also ==
- Cherryblossom, a Japanese rock band
- Sakura (disambiguation)
- Ōka (disambiguation)
- Perfect Cherry Blossom
