= Oka (surname) =

Oka (written: 岡 or 丘) is a Japanese surname. Notable people with the surname include:

== Japanese ==
- Asajiro Oka (丘 浅次郎; 1866–1944), Japanese zoologist, anatomist and evolutionist
- Ayumi Oka (born 1983), Japanese actress
- Ayumi Oka (born 1986), Japanese female tennis player
- Hideko Oka (岡 秀子; born 1953), Japanese fencer
- Jūrō Oka (岡 十郎; 1870–1923), Japanese businessman in whaling
- Kazuo Oka (born 1948), Japanese voice actor
- Kiyoshi Oka (1901–1978), Japanese mathematician
- Masi Oka (born 1974), Japanese American actor and digital effects artist
- Oka Rokumon (岡 鹿門; 1833–1914), Japanese sinologist
- Takeshi Oka (born 1932), Japanese-American chemist and astronomer
- Tomoko Oka (岡 智子; born 1964), Japanese fencer

== Indonesia ==
- Gedong Bagus Oka (1921–2002), Hindu reformer and philosopher in Indonesia
- Ida Bagus Oka (1936–2010), Indonesian politician
- Isyana Bagoes Oka (born 1980), Indonesian news presenter and politician

== Côte d'Ivoire ==
- Arsene Oka (born 1983), Côte d'Ivoire football (soccer) player
- Valérie Oka (1967–2023), Côte d'Ivoire artist

== India ==
- A. S. Oka, (born 1960), Indian jurist

== Fictional characters ==
- Oka (Asobi Asobase), a character in the manga series Asobi Asobase
- Oka Ruto, a character in the video game Yandere Simulator

== See also ==
- Ōka (surname)
- Ōoka (disambiguation)
