= Oka (Bithynia) =

Town of ancient Bithynia

Coordinates: 40°07′56″N 30°24′40″E

Oka was a town of ancient Bithynia, inhabited in Roman times. The name does not occur among ancient authors but is inferred from epigraphic and other evidence.

Its site is located near Harmanköy, Asiatic Turkey.
