= Sakura (Ayaka song) =

Single by Ayaka
- Released: February 12, 2018
- Recorded: 2017
- Genre: Pop
- Length: 4:09
- Label: A Station
- Songwriter: Ayaka
- Producer: Satoru Shionoya

Ayaka singles chronology
"Kotonoha" (2017)	"Sakura" (2018)	"Heart Up" (2018)

Audio sample
- "Sakura": file; help

"Sakura" (サクラ) is a song recorded by Japanese singer-songwriter Ayaka. It was officially released nationwide as a digital single through A Station on February 12, 2018. A limited physical release was initially made available through Ayaka's official fan club Room Ayaka and at concert venues for her Acoustic Live Tour 2017-2018 3-Star Raw concert tour on October 14, 2017.

== Background and composition ==
Ayaka wrote "Sakura", while Japanese pianist Satoru Shionoya arranged and produced the track, in the spring of 2017, as her first graduation song. She began performing the song on tour in September 2017, and due to fan demand, recorded and released it as a CD single a month later through concert venues and her fan club. Ayaka states that the song came about because she wanted to write a song for "people of all ages" to "reminisce about memories of their youth". "Sakura" is written in the key of B-flat major with a common time tempo of 72 beats per minute. Ayaka's vocals span from F_{3} to B♭_{4} in modal voice, and up to D_{5} in head voice.

== Chart performance ==
"Sakura" debuted at number 87 on the Billboard Japan Download Songs chart. The song peaked at number 33 on the weekly Mora singles chart. It ranked at number 59 on the weekly RecoChoku Singles Chart and at number 19 on the RecoChoku High-Resolution singles chart. In late March, "Sakura" soared to number 2 of the RecoChoku high-resolution singles chart and at number 23 on the Billboard Japan Download Songs chart. The song also made its debut on the Oricon Digital Singles Chart at number 20, with sales of 6,000 downloads, and entered the Billboard Japan Hot 100 at number 78.

== Charts ==
Chart (2018)	Peak position
Japan Weekly Digital Singles (Oricon)	20
Japan Hot 100 (Billboard)	78
Japan Download Songs (Billboard)	23
Japan Weekly Hi-Res Singles (RecoChoku)	2
Japan Weekly Singles (Mora)	33

== Sales ==
Region	Certification	Certified units/sales
Japan (single track)	—	6,000
