= Sakura (text editor) =

Text editor for Windows

Sakura Editor
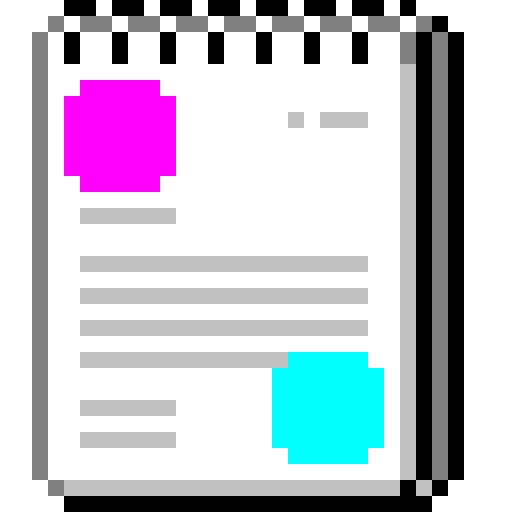
- Other names: サクラエディタ (Sakura Editor)
- Developer: Sakura Editor Project (サクラエディタプロジェクト)
- Initial release: April 1, 1999; 26 years ago
- Stable release: 2.4.2 / December 10, 2022; 3 years ago
- Preview release: 2.4.1-beta3 / May 20, 2020; 5 years ago
- Repository: github.com/sakura-editor/sakura
- Written in: C++
- Operating system: Windows
- Available in: Japanese
- License: zlib License
- Website: sakura-editor.github.io

Sakura Editor is a free and open-source Japanese text editor for Microsoft Windows.

== History ==
Sakura Editor was started by Take (たけ), the original author, around 1998 and the source code was made public around 2000. Development was carried out on SourceForge until May 2018, then it was moved to GitHub in June of the same year.

== Features ==
Sakura Editor uses cream color as the default background. It supports keyword highlighting, outline analysis, and completion. In addition, it has basic functions such as multiple encodings, grep, and macros. It notably supports handling documents with mixed line breaks. It also supports various character encodings such as Shift_JIS, ISO-2022-JP, EUC-JP, UTF-16, UTF-8, and UTF-7.

There are currently official 32-bit and alpha 64-bit versions.

=== License ===
Since v2.4.0, it has been distributed under the zlib license.
