= Sakura Pascarelli =

Italian scientist

- Born: Japan
- Education: La Sapienza
- Known for: XAS, XMCD
- Scientific career
- Workplaces: European XFEL; ESRF
- Thesis: Etude EXAFS d'alliages semiconducteurs épitaxiés par détection du rayonnement X de fluorescence

Sakura Pascarelli is an Italian physicist and the scientific director at the European XFEL. Her research focuses on the study on matter at extreme conditions of pressure, temperature and magnetic fields, in particular using X-ray absorption spectroscopy (XAS) and X-ray Magnetic Linear and Circular Dichroism (XMCD).

== Early life and education ==
Pascarelli was born in Japan. She received a Laurea in Physics from La Sapienza (Rome, Italy) and a PhD degree in Physics at the Joseph Fourier University (Grenoble, France). She is an accomplished swimmer.

== Research and career ==
Pascarelli was the head of the Matter at Extremes Group within the Experiment Division of the European Synchrotron Radiation Facility in Grenoble, France, and in charge of the X-ray absorption spectroscopy beamlines. She joined the European XFEL in Hamburg, Germany, as scientific director.

Pascarelli is a member of the scientific advisory committee of SLAC's Stanford Synchrotron Radiation Lightsource.
