= Sakura Saunders =

American writer

Sakura Saunders, born in 1979, is an American writer of Japanese descent who lives in Toronto. Over the course of the past ten years she has become a well-known media activist. Though she is affiliated with the anti-corporate movement Occupy Toronto, she prefers to style herself as a "mining justice organiser".

== Career ==
=== Music ===
In 2001, Saunders and a friend, Scott Soriano, established a minor record label in California, a label that mainly signs young up-and-coming hard-rock bands. Saunders left Soriano in sole charge of the record label when she quit to pursue a career in activism.

=== Radio and writing ===
Saunders pursued a career in radio and journalism; it was in these sectors that her interest in activism and the role of the media began to grow. Early on in her career, she served as the program director and office coordinator of KDVS, an American student and community radio station based in Davis, California. In addition to helping to start the low powered radio station KDRT in California, Sakura sits on the board of directors of the Prometheus Radio Project. Sakura's radio activism has been aired on station programmes such as Democracy Now! and Sprouts Radio and her writing has been published on CorpWatch.org, in The Dominion and in the San Francisco Bay Area publication Fault Lines. She has also contributed to the Mining Injustice Solidarity Network. She gives talks and presentations on internet and media issues.

== Activism ==
Saunders is an editor at an organisation, ProtestBarrick.net, that serves as a portal to groups researching and organising around mining issues, particularly involving mining company Barrick Gold. She is an active member and former resident of Occupy Toronto, where she volunteers on the facilitation committee. Saunders is well known for organising the Occupy protest outside of Barrick Gold's annual general shareholders meeting in Toronto. Starting at a park opposite the meeting's venue the preceding evening, Saunders persuaded the group to stay all night protesting, despite warnings from the police. The next day, the protesters rallied outside the meeting, with speakers from various initiatives and organisations introduced by Saunders.

She has also led protests against use of deadly force by police officers and the use of fossil fuels.

== Marriage ==
Saunders married her partner in the summer of 2011 in a non-religious activist-themed wedding. The wedding organiser said that, "the wedding was designed to not only be a celebration of the couple's love, but also of the political beliefs that existed within their relationship." The wedding took place in a public park in Toronto and a mass bike ride to the wedding dinner was organised, with the route adorned with messages of love and silk screened red anarchy hearts. Saunders said, "Having these highly visible messages made our wedding a demonstration promoting anarchy, which is just as much about dismantling state and corporate power as it is about mutual aid and love. It was also an opportunity to expose our family to a bit of rebellion and get them to engage with us in these liberating actions."
