= Tarumirim =

- Municipality
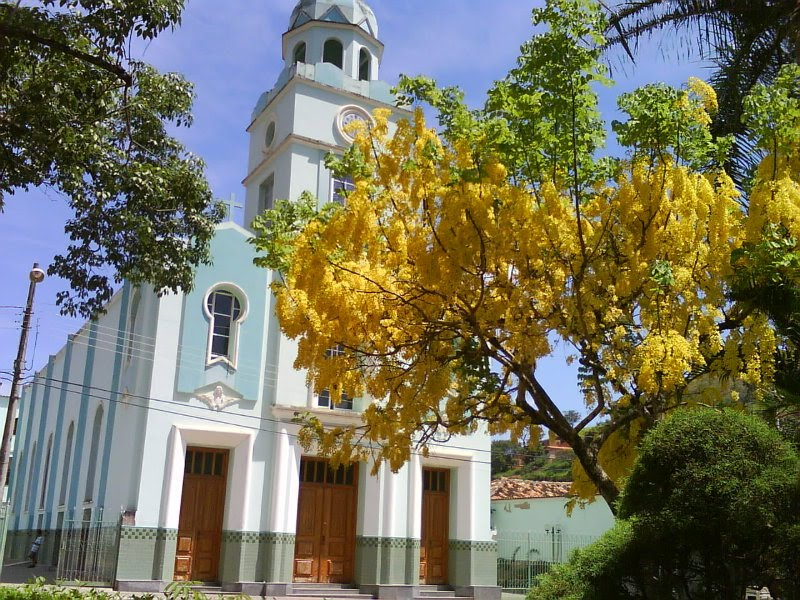

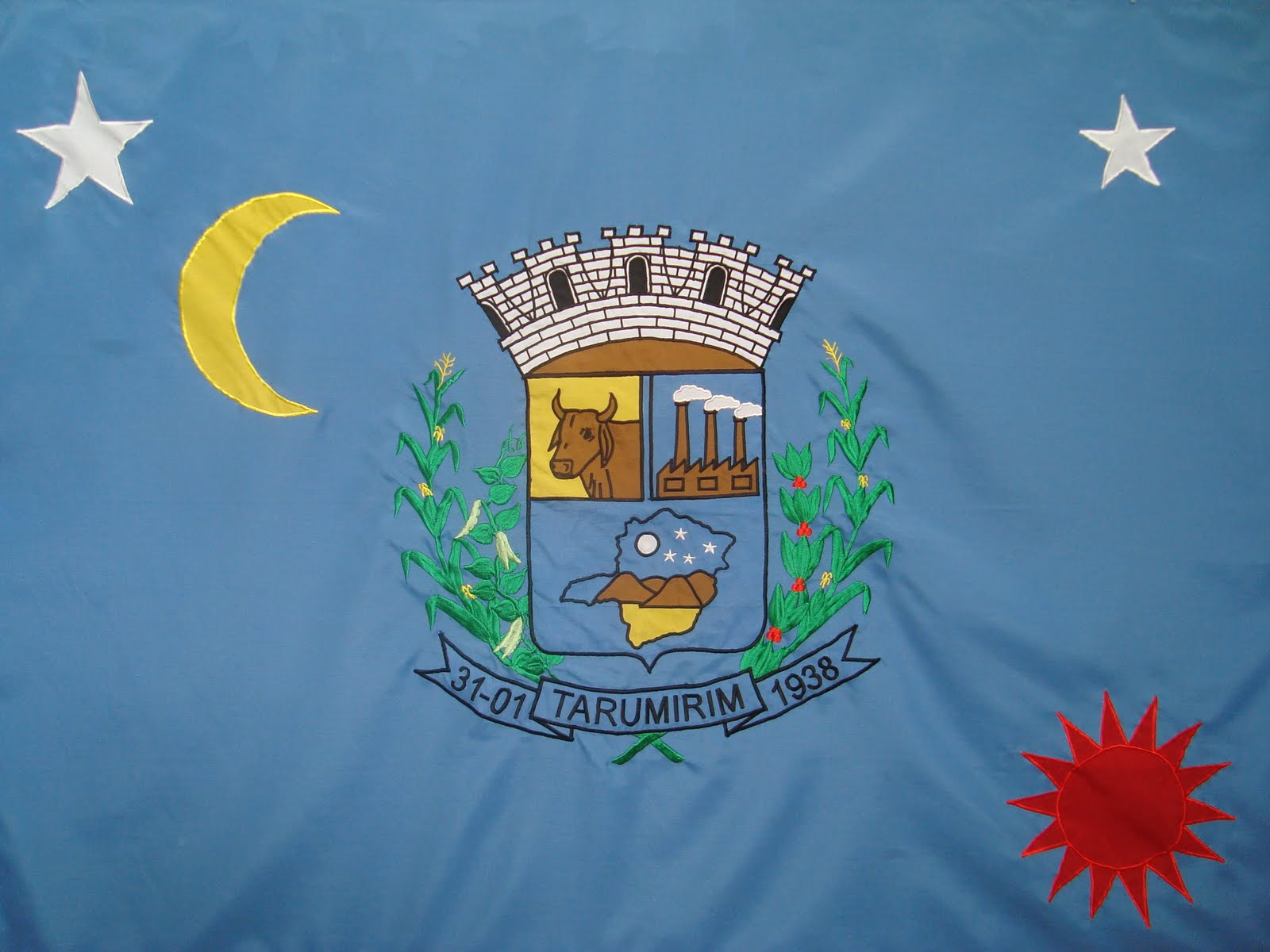
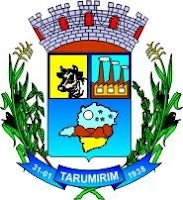
- Flag Coat of arms

- Location in Brazil
- Coordinates: 19°16′51″S 42°00′25″W
- Country: Brazil
- Region: Southeast
- State: Minas Gerais
- Mesoregion: Vale do Rio Doce
- Established: 1938

Government
  - Mayor: Marcilio de Paula Bomfim (DEM)

Population (2022 Census =)
  - Total: 14,709
  - Estimate (2025): 15,104
- Time zone: UTC−3 (BRT)
- Website: https://www.tarumirim.mg.gov.br/principal

Tarumirim is a municipality in east Minas Gerais state, Brazil. It is located in the Vale do Rio Doce region and its population was estimated at 15,104 inhabitants in 2025 (IBGE). It was first founded by the Cunha brothers in 1911 and was named Patrimonio Cunha and Then was considered a Municipality on January 31, 1938 and named Tarumirim an indigenous name that means "Little Sky".

Districts:

- Bananal de Baixo
- Bananal de Cima
- Beija-Flor
- Cafemirim
- Dom Carloto
- Pega Bem
- Santa Rita
- São Vicente
- Taruaçu de Minas
- Vai Volta

== See also ==
- List of municipalities in Minas Gerais
