= Ōoka =

Ōoka, Ooka or Oooka (大岡（おおおか）, Ōoka, "large hill") may refer to:

== Location ==
- Ōoka River (大岡川, Ōoka-gawa)
- Ōoka, Nagano (大岡村, Ōoka-mura)

== Surname ==
- Ōoka Tadasuke (大岡忠相, Ōoka Tadasuke) (1677–1752), Japanese judge, known in English juvenile literature as "Ooka the Wise" or "Solomon in Kimono"
- Shōhei Ōoka (大岡昇平, Ōoka Shōhei) (1909–1988), an author
- Makoto Ōoka (大岡信, Ōoka Makoto) (1931–2017), a poet

== See also ==
- Oka (disambiguation)
- Ōka (disambiguation)
