= Optical bonding =

Protective glass

Optical bonding refers to a protective glass that is glued in front of a display to enhance its readability where installed in high humidity outdoor environments. When a normal display is used in an outdoor environment, there are some factors that affect its readability. The most common one is “fog”, or condensation, which forms on the inner surface of display's vandal shield. Another factor is the reflection of sunlight, which causes a mirror-image on the display. Both phenomena can be solved by using optical bonding.

== Adhesive types ==
There are a wide variety of adhesives used for optical bonding processes. Three of the most commonly used are silicone, epoxy, and polyurethane. Below are overviews of the pros/cons of each adhesive type.

- Silicone: The most commonly found adhesive in optical bonding processes that dates back to the 1970s as a solution. Silicone's core properties of low conductivity and chemical reactivity, thermal stability, and ability to repel water and form watertight seals make it a common solution for optical bonding. Also, because it is a soft material, it is very feasible to rework for bonds that become damaged over time. However, debris often forms around the edges of the bonds if they are rubbed during handling. To reduce this, edges of optically bonded displays should be covered or configured so that edges are not exposed.
- Epoxy: When used as a structural glue, epoxy resin creates a more rigid bond than silicone, thus eliminating the formation of particulate debris, which is common with silicone bonding processes. However, epoxy bonding is not reworkable.
- Polyurethane: Polyurethane adhesives are commonly utilized in bonding applications for displays in avionic technology and polar technology. However, this bonding adhesive yellows over time when exposed to light, so by today's standards it is considered an obsolete adhesive.

== Basic idea ==
Optical bonding is the use of an optical-grade adhesive to glue a glass to the top surface of a display. The main goal of optical bonding is to improve the display performance under outdoor environments. This method eliminates the air gap between the cover glass and the display. Moreover, anti-reflective coating is often used in optical bonding glass. The real problem for display readability in outdoor environments is not the display's brightness but its contrast. Contrast means the ratio of the white level to the black level; in other words, the contrast ratio of display means the difference of light intensity between the brightest white pixel and the darkest black pixel. The main purpose of optical bonding is to increase the display's contrast ratio by reducing the amount of reflected ambient light.

== See also ==
- Transflective liquid crystal display
