= Sakurano =

Sakurano (written: 桜野, meaning "cherry blossom field") is a Japanese surname. Notable people with the surname include:

- Ayane Sakurano (桜乃 彩音) (born 1983), Japanese actress
- Minene Sakurano (桜野 みねね), Japanese manga artist

Fictional characters:

- Aguri Sakurano (桜野 亜玖璃, Sakurano Aguri), a character in the light novel series Gamers!
- Kurimu Sakurano (桜野 くりむ), a character in the light novel series Seitokai no Ichizon
- Otoha Sakurano (桜野 音羽), the main character of the anime series Sky Girls
- Tazusa Sakurano (桜野 タズサ), the main character in the light novel series Ginban Kaleidoscope
