= Tokko (manga) =

Japanese manga series

- First tankōbon volume cover, featuring Sakura Rokujo
- Genre: Action; Horror; Supernatural
- Manga
- Written by: Tōru Fujisawa
- Published by: Kodansha
- English publisher: NA: Tokyopop
- Imprint: Afternoon KC
- Magazine: Monthly Afternoon
- Original run: April 25, 2003 – February 25, 2004
- Volumes: 3
- Anime television series
- Directed by: Masashi Abe
- Produced by: Yoshihiro Iwasaki; Daisuke Katagiri; Hiroshi Sakurai (animation); Yoshiyuki Matsuzaki (animation)
- Written by: Mitsuhiro Yamada
- Music by: No Milk; Aoki Takamasa; Dachambo; DJ Baku; Heprcam; Kōji Sekiguchi; Kankawa; DJ Kensei; Numb
- Studio: Group TAC; AIC Spirits
- Licensed by: AUS: Madman Entertainment (Note: Expired license); NA: Manga Entertainment; UK: Manga Entertainment
- Original network: Wowow
- English network: US: Sci Fi; Chiller
- Original run: April 16, 2006 – July 30, 2006
- Episodes: 13
- Manga

Tokko Zero
- Written by: Tōru Fujisawa
- Illustrated by: Yukai Asada
- Published by: Hero's Inc.
- Magazine: Monthly Hero's
- Original run: July 1, 2013 – March 1, 2016
- Volumes: 4
- icon

Tokko (stylized as TOKKÔ) is a Japanese manga series written and illustrated by Tōru Fujisawa. It was serialized in Kodansha's seinen manga magazine Monthly Afternoon from April 2003 to February 2004, with its chapters collected in three tankōbon volumes. The manga was licensed in North America by Tokyopop, who released all three volumes from July 2008 to February 2009.

An anime television series adaptation produced by Group TAC and AIC Spirits aired on Wowow from April to July 2006. The anime was licensed in the United States and United Kingdom by Manga Entertainment, with its first DVD released on March 20, 2007, and in Australasia by Madman Entertainment. In the United States, Sci Fi aired the series from June to September 2007 and later re-aired it from November to December 2010 when it was renamed to Syfy. Its sister network Chiller would also air the series from July to October 2009.

== Plot ==
In 2011, Tokyo is plagued by supernatural threats stemming from the Machida massacre, a gruesome incident secretly orchestrated by demons known as Phantoms. These creatures originate from the netherworld, having crossed into reality after the "Box of Dirge" (or "Druj") was shattered into 108 fragments, each possessed by a powerful Phantom. To combat this menace, the Public Security Intelligence Agency establishes the Special Public Safety Task Force, or "Tokko" (特公, Tokkō), under Superintendent Ryoko Ibuki. Composed primarily of survivors from the Machida incident, Tokko's members harbor dormant Phantoms within them, granting superhuman abilities when awakened, including enhanced speed and the power to materialize swords. These weapons are essential, as conventional firearms prove ineffective against the Phantoms and their lesser human-faced larval parasites, which emerge through massive holes caused by unnatural earthquakes in the Kanto region.

Tokko operates covertly, drawing criticism from other law enforcement agencies for their secretive methods and cover-ups of civilian and police casualties, which are publicly attributed to armed criminals or mental instability. Each member bears a symbiont tattoo, marking them as hosts to one of the 108 Phantoms. The alignment of these spirits remains unknown until awakened, though they provide passive protection—such as shielding Sakura Rokujo from a fatal car accident in her youth. Tokko's mission is to hunt down rogue Phantoms, reclaim the Box of Dirge fragments, and seal the expanding Machida hole before it consumes the world.

Ranmaru Shindo, a young investigator, joins the Special Mobile Investigation Forces (Tokki) to uncover the truth behind his parents' deaths in the Machida massacre. Haunted by recurring dreams of a bloodied, tattooed girl wielding a massive sword, he encounters her in reality—Sakura Rokujo, a Tokko operative. Alongside her are the prodigious Kureha Suzuka, the taciturn Takeru Inukai, and their leader, Ryoko Ibuki. Rumors swirl around Tokko, alleging they execute criminals with swords, leave dismembered bodies at crime scenes, and may not even be human.

While investigating a brutal murder, Ranmaru's team witnesses a demonic attack by larval parasites, which identify him as a Machida survivor. Sakura intervenes, revealing that the massacre was perpetrated by Phantoms who crossed into the world after the Box of Dirge was opened. The stronger Phantoms consume humans to grow more powerful, and Tokko's symbionts are the only ones capable of stopping them.

Determined to fight, Ranmaru and his partner Hanazono infiltrate the quarantined Machida site, inadvertently provoking a Phantom attack. Tokko rescues them and explains that symbionts—awakened through near-death trauma—are the sole means of defeating the creatures. To activate his latent Phantom, Kureha mortally wounds Ranmaru and hurls him into the Machida hole. He emerges transformed, wielding dual swords and swiftly annihilating the 12th Phantom. After recovering, he joins Tokko as the countdown to Tokyo's destruction continues.

Meanwhile, siblings Itsuto and Mayu Araragi, unaffiliated symbiont hunters, consume Phantoms to absorb their powers. They rescue Yukino Shiraishi, a suicide attempt survivor controlled by a larval parasite. Investigating disappearances at her university, they uncover a conspiracy led by Yukino's father, who experiments on students by turning them into Phantom hybrids. After a fierce battle, Yukino kills her father by burning their home, then joins the siblings to prevent further atrocities.

The epilogue hints that Tokyo is ultimately consumed by the Machida hole, underscoring the relentless struggle between humanity and the encroaching netherworld.

== Characters ==
Cover of the first North American home media release for the anime television series

Ranmaru Shindo (申道 蘭丸, Shindō Ranmaru)
Voiced by: Kenichi Suzumura (Japanese); Tony Oliver (English)
One of the survivors of the Machida massacre alongside his young sister Saya, he joined the police force to find out who was responsible for murdering his parents. An officer in the Shibuya precinct as a detective in the Tokki division, he finds out during his work that demons from the other realm are responsible for orchestrating various massacres. Later on, he joins the Tokko division so as to save the country from being overrun by the demons. He suffers from Post-traumatic stress disorder due to the massacre and the deaths of his parents when he and his sister were still in kids. Since he survived the Machida incident, all Phantom demons were given instruction to finish him off, as well as any other witnesses who have seen the events. As he and Saya were the only survivors of the Shindo family, the two became very close after they were tragically orphaned. His symbiont tattoos are on his right forearm and left shoulder.
Sakura Rokujo (六条 さくら, Rokujō Sakura)
Voiced by: Fumiko Orikasa (Japanese); Philece Sampler (English)
One of the survivors of the Machida massacre, she was the woman haunting Ranmaru's dreams of his parents and neighbors being killed by a Phantom demon. Working in the Tokko division in the Shibuya precinct, the 18-year-old handles a broadsword in dispatching the Phantoms. Her tattoos are on her right shoulder and arm, a dragon, and left arm. Her brother was also a survivor but has been unconscious since then, she resolves to kill all the monsters.
In the anime, it is also hinted that she may have feelings for Ranmaru when she kissed him before she went into his psyche in order to help save him from being possessed. Later on in the anime, she is forced to face her own brother when the symbionts inside of him possess him and turn him into evil. In the final episode Ranmaru stabs her with his sword (and kisses her) to gain her shard, hinting that she dies, however at the end of the episode she is seen laying in a hospital bed apparently in a coma. She then wakes up and we hear evil laughter (not Sakura's).
Kureha Suzuka (鈴鹿 紅葉, Suzuka Kureha)
Voiced by: Kana Ueda (Japanese); Tara Platt (English)
A young prodigy who joined the police force at the age of 18 with the rank of Assistant Inspector, (Note: Their ranks differ from the manga and anime. For instance, Ryoko is addressed as superintendent, while Kureha is addressed as an inspector in the anime.) (Note: The ranks are also contradictory in a sort of way with actual ranks used by the National Police Agency since the rank of Lieutenant is an equal to Assistant Inspector, which is the rank of Kureha's. Ryoko's Superintendent rank's equal is the rank of Major.) she is posted in the Tokko division.
Her preferred weapons are two daggers that have four retractable blades. Kureha does not wear a shirt with the Tokko division's black leather jacket and pants, revealing a tattoo of a butterfly above her pierced belly-button. In the anime, she originally had brown hair, before changing it to blonde after the massacre as a means of moving on after her parents were killed by Phantoms and the death of her younger brother, Akito, at her hands. Her symbiont tattoo, never shown in the manga, was on her right shoulder in the anime.
Ryoko Ibuki (伊吹 涼子, Ibuki Ryōko)
Voiced by: Rio Natsuki (Japanese); Michelle Ruff (English)
Commanding officer of the Tokko division with the rank of Superintendent, she is responsible for the Tokko's operations in conducting anti-Phantom operations in Tokyo. She prefers guns over other weapons and is never actually confirmed to be a symbiont in the manga; in the anime she is explicitly said to be a normal human.
Takeru Inukai (犬飼 武流, Inukai Takeru)
Voiced by: Susumu Akagi (Japanese); Kirk Thornton (English)
The only male main member of Tokko, he survived the Machida incident by tearing apart his parents' killers with his bare hands. He is usually silent and dresses in black clothing and wears black shades. In the anime, he was recruited by Ryoko after demons kidnapped his sister and had been a martial artist (implied to be kendo) before joining the police. He is later killed by Sakura's possessed brother back in the ruins of the Machida apartment in episode eleven.
Saya Shindo (申道 沙也, Shindō Saya)
Voiced by: Akemi Kanda (Japanese); Megan Hollingshead (English)
Younger sister of Ranmaru, she joined the police force as a uniformed patrol officer. As a survivor of the Machida massacre, she also has a phantom inside her, though it is never awakened. Unlike her brother, she does not experience post-traumatic stress disorder as she opts to forget the memories of the events in Machida. Like her brother, she gets targeted for assassination by the Phantom demons, as she was one of the survivors of the murders. When not in police work or in danger from being assassinated by the Phantoms, she nags Ranmaru like a mother, such as telling him to finish his food or go have himself checked up for any injuries. She cares deeply about him and will do everything that she can to make sure that he is okay.
Ichiro Hanazono (花園 一郎, Hanazono Ichirō)
Voiced by: Tadashi Mutō (Japanese); Grant George (English)
Ranmaru's best friend and partner. They graduated together and are assigned to the same commander. They can be troublemakers when together. Ichiro often calls Ranmaru a pervert and says that he has something for his younger sister. In actuality Hanazono has a crush on Saya and often gets mad at Ranmaru for always being around attractive women, stating that he used to think Ranmaru was loser.
Kaoru Kunikida (國樹田 薫, Kunikida Kaoru)
Voiced by: Wataru Takagi (Japanese); Doug Stone (English)
Chief Inspector of the Shibuya branch of Tokki, where Ranmaru and Hanazono are assigned. He hates the Tokko division and its members for being so secretive, especially when his fellow officers were murdered by the Phantoms and its human-controlled slaves via Human Face larvae. He is insistent in finding out the reasons why Tokko exists and its agenda, to the cost of possibly losing his job over this. He is especially infuriated when Ranmaru leaves his division for Tokko. In the anime, he appears to have a daughter named Ruru (most likely a nickname) and is also a womanizer.
Based on various side remarks on Kaoru during certain events in the series, it is apparent that he might have been a gangster in his youth before he decided to reform himself as a police officer. His rough behavior and language also fit the general stereotype of a yakuza.
Shogo Muramasa (村正 将吾, Muramasa Shōgo)
Voiced by: Hiroshi Tsuchida (Japanese); Dan Woren (English)
Kunikida's subordinate and serves as his right-hand man, supporting the Special Machine Squad.
Itsuto Araragi (荒羅木 一斗, Araragi Itsuto)
Voiced by: Daiki Matsubayashi (Japanese); David Vincent (English)
He and his sister Maya are hunters unaffiliated with Tokko. A survivor from Machida, he "awakened" when he and Maya walked in on their parents being eaten by phantoms. Together they hunt phantoms and eat them to get stronger, absorbing their abilities, and aim to eventually kill them all.
Mayu Araragi (荒羅木 繭, Araragi Mayu)
Voiced by: Shiho Kawaragi (Japanese); Jennie Kwan (English)
She and her older brother Itsuto are hunters unaffiliated with Tokko. As survivor from Machida, they hunt phantoms together and eat them to get stronger by absorbing their abilities, aiming to eventually kill them all. She is adept at detecting phantoms and can insert any image she wants into someone else's mind, a sort of hallucination, although she can physically hold her own.
Yukino Shiraishi (白石 雪乃, Shiraishi Yukino)
Voiced by: Aya Endo (Japanese); Dorothy Elias-Fahn (English)
She is accidentally saved from committing suicide by Itsuko and Mayu. After deducing she was being controlled by a phantom, the two learn students have been going missing at the university she works at and that there are rumors of "demons". It all started when Yukino discovered and took back the university what was in fact a Phantom hand from Machida. Her father began experimenting and learned humans can become a hybrid of human and phantom by eating them and began to turn the students as well, with some willingly agreeing. He planted a larva in Yukino to make her commit suicide when she walked in on him trying to force her mother to eat phantom and killed her when she refused.
In the anime her character is different, she is often referred to as the "hottie from the crime lab" by Ranmaru's colleagues. Her mother died prior to the Machida incident, with her father becoming obsessed with his research soon after. Saya set her and Ranmaru up on a blind date that ended up in them finding out more about the phantoms. Later on, on a second date they were attacked by Yukino's father after he turned himself into a phantom/human hybrid. Leaving her job awhile after, Yukino gives Ranmaru the info behind the murderer of her mother who caused the Machida incident.
Hiroki Rokujo (六条 大樹, Rokujo Hiroki)
Voiced by: Hiro Shimono (Japanese); Yuri Lowenthal (English)
Sakura's younger brother. He was attacked by the Phantom during the Machida incident and was left in a vegetative state.

== Media ==
=== Manga ===
Written and illustrated by Tōru Fujisawa, Tokko was serialized in Kodansha's seinen manga magazine Monthly Afternoon from April 25, 2003, (Note: Debuted in the magazine's June 2003 issue, released on April 25, 2003.) to February 25, 2004. (Note: Finished in the magazine's April 2004 issue.) Kodansha collected its chapters in three tankōbon volumes, released from February 6 to June 23, 2004. The first two volumes are subtitled Devil's Awaken, while the third volume, subtitled Phantom Hunter, is a side story following two siblings (male and female) who happen to be survivors of the Machida massacre.

In North America, the manga was licensed by Tokyopop. Three volumes were released from July 1, 2008, to February 1, 2009.

In the July 2013 issue of Hero's Inc.'s seinen manga magazine Monthly Hero's released on June 1, it was announced that a prequel series to Tokko would begin serialization in the next month's issue. Titled Tokko Zero (特公 零 TOKKO ZERO, Tokkō Rei), it was written by Fujisawa and illustrated by Yukai Asada. It was serialized in Monthly Hero's from July 1, 2013, to March 1, 2016. Its chapters were compiled in four tankōbon volumes, released from March 31, 2014, to May 2, 2016.

==== Volumes ====
No.	Title	Original release date	English release date
1	Devil's Awaken (1)	February 6, 2004; 978-4-06-314338-6	July 1, 2008; 978-1-4278-0974-2
2	Devil's Awaken (2)	February 6, 2004; 978-4-06-314339-3	November 9, 2008; 978-1-4278-0975-9
3	Phantom Hunter	June 23, 2004; 978-4-06-314344-7	February 1, 2009; 978-1-4278-0976-6

==== Tokko Zero volumes ====
No.	Release date	ISBN
1	March 31, 2014	978-4-86-468360-9
2	December 5, 2014	978-4-86-468392-0
3	August 5, 2015	978-4-86-468426-2
4	May 2, 2016	978-4-86-468461-3

=== Anime ===
A 13-episode anime television series adaptation was broadcast on Wowow from April 16 to July 30, 2006. (Note: Tokko aired on Wowow on Saturday 24:30, effectively Sunday at 12:30 a.m. JST.) Three DVD volumes were released from August 25 to November 24, 2006. The opening theme is "Nothing" and the ending theme is "Sherry", both performed by dB. The Tokko Original Soundtrack was released on June 28, 2006. It includes eleven tracks without the opening and closing themes from the anime.

The anime was licensed in the United States and United Kingdom by Manga Entertainment, and in Australasia by Madman Entertainment. It was broadcast in the United States on Sci Fi (later known as Syfy) as part of its Ani-Monday anime programming block from June 18 to September 24, 2007. Chiller, a sister network of Sci Fi also owned by NBCUniversal, also aired the series from July to October 2009.

==== Episodes ====
No.	English title (Japanese translated title) (Note: The English title, albeit stylized in all lowercase, is featured in the original Japanese version as a secondary title to the translated title.)	Directed by (Note: Production staff information is taken from the ending credits of each episode.)	Storyboarded by	Animation directed by	Original release date	English air date (Note: Full list of airdates:)
1	"Awakening" ("Dawn"); Transliteration: "Akatsuki" (Japanese: 暁)	Naoto Hashimoto	Masashi Abe	Kōji Watanabe	April 16, 2006	June 18, 2007
Ranmaru Shindo, five years after surviving the tragic Machida massacre, graduates from the Special Mobile Investigation Troops First Division Police academy after he was recruited into the police force as a patrolman since the two Shindo siblings have joined the police force as part of moving on from what happened in Machida. During his transfer to the Shibuya police station, he encounters the red-haired woman in a police uniform who had been the sole cause of his nightmares and two officers, who are said to be elite officers from the Tokko division.
2	"A Girl Appears" ("Dream"); Transliteration: "Yume" (Japanese: 夢)	Tōru Yamada	Tōru Yamada	Takaaki Sawada	April 23, 2006	June 25, 2007
Ranmaru and Ichiro meet the members of Tokko, one of whom is the red-haired woman from Ranmaru's dreams. Her name is Sakura Rokujo, and she was once a neighbor of Ranmaru before the Machida massacre. Later, Kunikida and Muramasa discover that any incident involving the monsters hunted by Tokko is covered up.
3	"Moments Would Be Lost" ("Bonds"); Transliteration: "Kizuna" (Japanese: 絆)	Shūji Kitayama	Kazuma Fujimori	Mariko Aoki	April 30, 2006	July 2, 2007
With the recent attacks on police officers by the possessed human-like zombies and Ranmaru's near death from one of them a few days ago, he began to reflect about what happened from his first day of duty as a Tokko detective and on the Machida massacre, especially on the mysterious tattoo that appeared on his right arm. Concerned about where it came from and how it showed up, Saya took him to a nearby police hospital to be checked up on. While waiting for the results of his checkup, Ranmaru sneaks inside a PSIA-guarded hospital ward that housed Sakura's younger brother, who was almost a victim in the Machida incident.
4	"Corpses in the Laboratory" ("Omen"); Transliteration: "Chō" (Japanese: 兆)	Akihiko Nishiyama	Akihiko Nishiyama	Yoshiko Nakajima	May 14, 2006	July 9, 2007
Saya gets Ranmaru a date, in the form of forensic expert Yukino Shiraishi, who happens to be Saya's upperclassman in her high school days. During Ranmaru and Yukino's date, Ranmaru discovered that the demons who were responsible for the Machida massacre five years ago and for the death of his police comrades were believed to be of European origin, with Yukino filling Ranmaru in on the background on a Western urban legend that the demons were summoned by alchemists in order to achieve immortality during the Middle Ages in Europe.
5	"A Father, All Alone" ("Devil"); Transliteration: "Oni" (Japanese: 鬼)	Shinji Ushiro	Takashi Kobayashi & Shinji Ushiro	Shigenori Taniguchi	May 21, 2006	July 16, 2007
After a suspicious car accident, Sakura visits Ranmaru in his hospital room. She warns him not to get further involved into what had happened to him near the forensic building the night before. Kunikida, thought to have been granted a request to investigate the forensic building for evidence to suggest that Tokko was concealing evidence from the public, is denied by top National Police Agency officials. Yukino then visits Ranmaru back in the Shibuya police station, warning him that her father was researching on the strange creatures that Ranmaru had encountered before.
6	"Who Kills My Brother" ("Sorrow"); Transliteration: "Ai" (Japanese: 哀)	Noriaki Akitaya	Masashi Abe	Shinobu Nishiyama	May 28, 2006	July 23, 2007
In a closed meeting with Councilor Ogata, Superintendent Ryoko Ibuki discloses to her superior that Ranmaru is a possible symbiont, telling him that she'll have him killed if it has to be the case. Later on, Ryoko informs Kureha to see if Ranmaru has the symbiont inside of him. Back in the Tokki office, Muramasa informs Ranmaru to entertain Kunikida, who didn't go to work since he was angry at the NPA officials for denying his search warrant on the forensic building. Ranmaru was about to tell Kunikida what happened at the forensic building last night when Kureha arrives on her motorbike, and she asks to take Ranmaru out on a date.
7	"A Telephone Call" ("Love"); Transliteration: "Koi" (Japanese: 恋)	Masashi Abe	Naoto Hashimoto	Kōji Watanabe	June 18, 2006	August 6, 2007
Sakura relives her memories of meeting with Inukai and his sister prior to joining Tokko. After another one of Tokko's clashes against the Gaki demons, Ranmaru receives an anonymous call from a mysterious person who could provide him information as to the true reasons behind the events behind the Machida massacre years ago. During his investigation, he is suddenly attacked by a lone Phantom demon in the nearby park, specifically the thirteenth Phantom demon.
8	"Time to Say Goodbye" ("Awakening"); Transliteration: "Sei" (Japanese: 醒)	Yoshimichi Hirai	Tōru Yamada	Hideaki Shimada & Takaaki Sawada	June 25, 2006	August 13, 2007
As Ranmaru continues to get deeper and deeper into the mystery of the Phantom demons, he is accosted by two strange men wearing dark sunglasses and wielding pistols when he was walking in a local park. To make things worse, Saya gets injured in a depicted hit and run accident staged during her break hours by an unknown vehicle. Ryoko and the others inform Ranmaru that some sort of cult society may have hired assassins to kill her.
9	"We Were Born to Be" ("Brave"); Transliteration: "Rin" (Japanese: 凜)	Taiki Nishimura	Kazuma Fujimori	Mariko Aoki	July 2, 2006	August 20, 2007
Ranmaru gets unofficially transferred to the Tokko division while still being under the official command of Tokki, which angers Kunikida and thinks that Akiha may have been responsible for Ranmaru's supposed transfer. In a meeting with the Phantom Countermeasures Committee, led by top NPA officials, they accuse Ryoko of wasting her time in their investigation against the Phantoms and not doing anything to calm the public about the supposed serial murder cases since Ranmaru's own symbiont was awakened by her subordinates without their authorization.
10	"Never Mind" ("Trembling"); Transliteration: "Yō" (Japanese: 揺)	Takatoshi Suzuki	Hiroki Hayashi	Yoshiko Nakajima & Seung Hee Yoo	July 9, 2006	August 27, 2007
Yukino visits Ranmaru in the Shibuya Police Station in the early morning, delivering the book regarding the Box of Dirge and information regarding a supposed piece of the box. Later, during a courtesy call to an old man, Taishi, who called Ranmaru earlier on, his symbiont begins to slowly corrupt his mind and body after his attacks were thwarted by his mysterious strength. He is rescued by Sakura and the others with an unknown necklace on his neck, but Ranmaru's slowly corrupted symbiont uses him to attack Akiha and the others before Ryoko is forced to use her Colt SAA revolver to fire a shot at Ranmaru's chest, severely wounding him.
11	"No Woman, No Cry" ("Prison"); Transliteration: "Goku" (Japanese: 獄)	Shigeki Awai	Takashi Kobayashi & Shigeki Awai	Shigenori Taniguchi & Masakazu Yamazaki	July 16, 2006	September 3, 2007
Hiroki, Sakura's younger brother, is awakened with a Phantom spirit when it infiltrated the Udagawa Police Hospital in Tokyo and the doctors who were attending to the unconscious teenager. During an encounter with Tokko, Hiroki wounds Sakura and drives off the other members, barely surviving. Despite this, Sakura wishes to help her brother by trying her best to purge the Phantom spirit out of his body.
12	"If Not In Love" ("Rage"); Transliteration: "Nu" (Japanese: 怒)	Yuta Maruyama	Masami Nagata	Shinobu Nishiyama	July 23, 2006	September 17, 2007
Tokko decides to move Saya to a safer place, more specially to Ryoko's apartment, for her own protection. Ryoko pays a surprise visit to the Tokki offices, and she manages to obtain information from Muramasa that he was the inside man paid by Taishi to provide police information regarding the case after threatening him with her Colt SAA revolver. Later on, Taishi dispatches Gakis to assassinate all active Tokko members as a means of further slowing down their investigation against him.
13	"Remain Tender Together" ("Dark"); Transliteration: "Rei" (Japanese: 黎)	Masashi Abe	Shinji Ishihira & Masashi Abe	Kōji Watanabe	July 30, 2006	September 24, 2007
Kunikida encounters Muramasa and after an argument, the two tried to shoot each other when Kunikida heard Muramasa ordering that Ranmaru and the other Tokko operatives are to be arrested and taken care of. Back at the Machida apartment complex, Ranmaru and the others assemble to do battle against Taishi, with Kureha severely wounded. Ranmaru and Sakura head into the underworld via the giant hole in Machida in order to rescue Saya and defeat Taishi. The end of the anime seems incomplete because it doesn't show the complete destruction of the demons. Moreover, when Ranmaru is in the hospital next to Sakura, there is another hole as big as the one in Machida as Taishi's laughter echoes across the scene.

=== Radio drama ===
A radio drama had taken place on October 11, 2006. It had briefly expanded a bit on the events after the anime had ended.
