= Sakurazawa =

Sakurazawa (written: 桜沢 or 櫻澤 lit. "cherry blossom stream") is a Japanese surname. Notable people with the surname include:

- Erica Sakurazawa (桜沢 エリカ) (born 1963), Japanese manga artist
- Nyoiti Sakurazawa (1893–1966), advocate of Macrobiotics
- Yasunori Sakurazawa (櫻澤 泰徳) (born 1969), Japanese musician known by the stage name Sakura

== See also ==
- Sakurazawa Station (桜沢駅, Sakurazawa-eki), train station in Yorii, Saitama Prefecture, Japan
