= Golden Bat (cigarette) =

Japanese filterless cigarette brand

- An old Japanese pack of Golden Bat cigarettes
- Product type: Cigarette
- Current owner: Japan Tobacco
- Produced by: Japan Tobacco
- Country: Empire of Japan
- Introduced: 1906; 120 years ago
- Markets: Empire of Japan, Japan

Golden Bat (Japanese: ゴールデンバット, romanized: Gōruden batto), or Kinshi as it was known from 1940 to May 1949, is a Japanese filterless brand of cigarettes, currently owned and manufactured by Japan Tobacco.

== History ==
The brand was launched in 1906. The brand has been known by the alias of "Bat" for a long time. After enforcement of the tobacco monopoly system in Japan, in September 1906 (Meiji 39), it was placed on the market by the then-Monopoly Bureau, the Ministry of Finance (the forerunner of "Japan Tobacco and Salt Public Corporation"). In the present cigarette market, Golden Bat is famous for being the oldest brand in Japan as it reached its centennial in 2006.

It used to feature a slender roll, and was manufactured for the general public. Although it is not as popular anymore, there are habitually ardent and deep-rooted smokers of it. That can be the reason leading to an exceptional long seller.

As of July 2006, a 20-pack cost 140 yen and was known as the cheapest cigarette in Japan. It was taxed low due to using the low grade of tobacco leaves categorized into third class. Incidentally it was 4 sen (0.04 yen) per a 10-pack when it was put on the market in 1906. Since April 2016, however, tax increases were enforced and Golden Bat lost its preferential tax status.

The background of using a bat as the brand, at first exported to China, in which a bat symbolized good luck, was being planned. As a product for export, it had been manufactured since 1905 (Meiji 38), a year earlier than domestic sale.

The package featuring golden bats on a green background has undergone minor design changes over time while retaining its core elements.

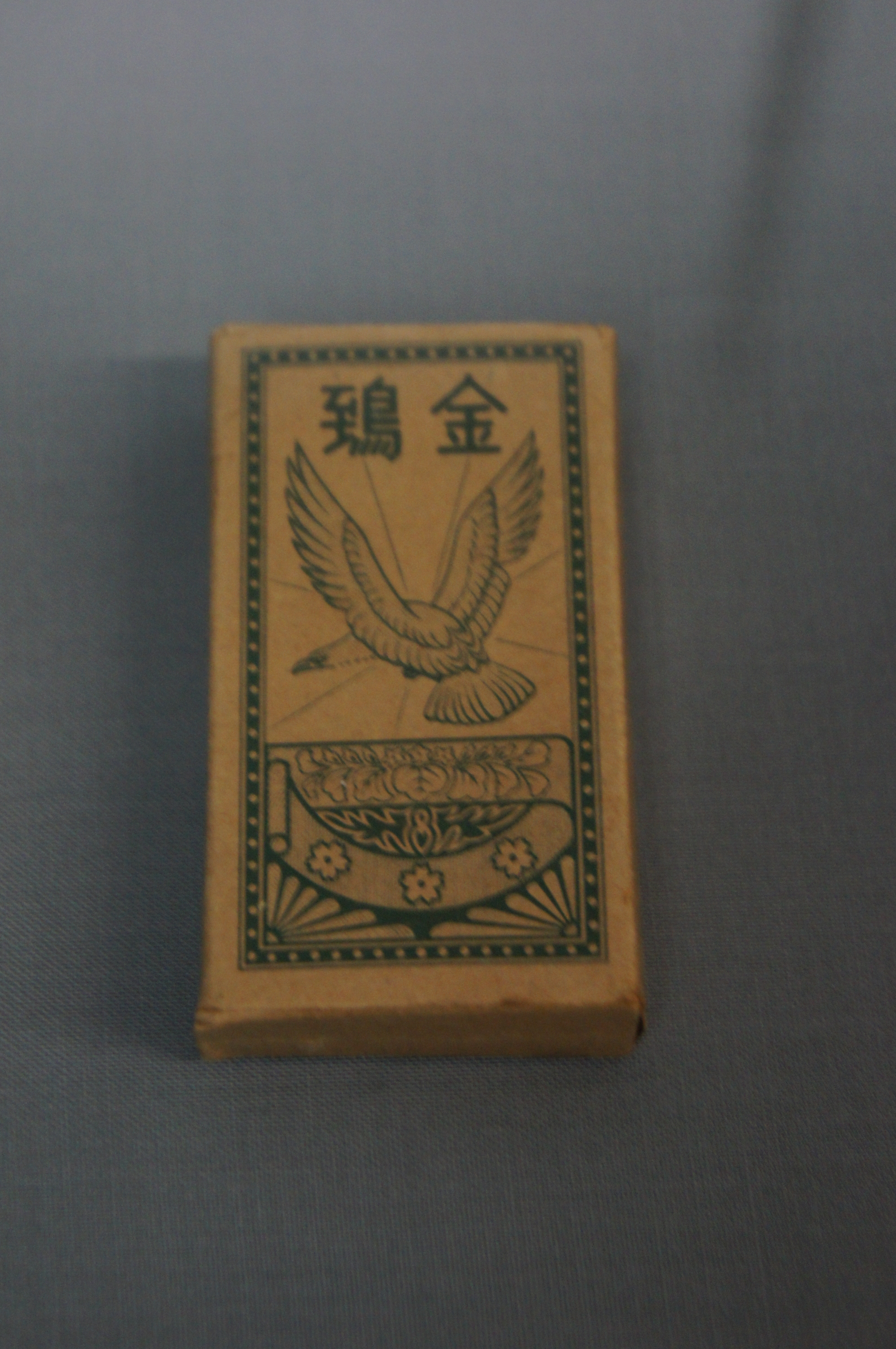
A pack of "Kinshi" cigarettes

In 1940, because of the rise of Japanese ultranationalism the name of Golden Bat, which was based on English, was considered a "hostile word" and changed to "Kinshi", meaning golden kite. This name was based on the mythology of Emperor Jimmu, who was the first emperor of Japan. The packaging design was also changed along with it. At first, a golden kite perching on the edge of a bow was depicted; in Japanese mythology, a kite perched on the edge of Jimmu's bow helped defeat his enemies by emitting rays of dazzling light. However, the bow was removed because it resulted in this nationalist mythological imagery being thrown away or stepped on. The brand changed its name back to Golden Bat in 1949.

A filtered Golden Bat variant was sold nationwide in 1997. The package was redesigned to be modern, and TV commercials and advertisements were frequently shown. The price, quantity of tar and nicotine were almost the same as most other brands, and it was a kind of a new brand of the oldest tobacco brand of Japan; however, it was discontinued in May 2003. After that, in July 2004, although Golden Bat Box (tea flavor) and Golden Bat Menthol Box (cassis flavor) were put on the market in the Miyagi Prefecture, these tobaccos also did not lead to stability of purchasing and were discontinued in February 2005.

Appearance of the package was changed widely in 2005 because a new text warning was put on it. Habitual smokers of Golden Bat criticized it as destroying history; however, the design has changed afterwards, with silver paper and a tag. Also the roll size of the cigarettes was changed into the same size as the general ones, and both the roll and flavor became thicker than before.

It used to have 18 mg of tar and 1.1 mg of nicotine, but during the 100th anniversary of the brand (which was in June 2016) the content has been lowered to 15 mg of tar and 1.0 mg of nicotine.

== Controversy ==
=== Opium in Chinese sold Golden Bat cigarettes ===
As part of the plans for the exploitation of China, during the 1930s and 1940s the subsidiary tobacco industry of Mitsui had started production of special "Golden Bat" cigarettes using the then-popular in the Far East trademark. Their circulation was prohibited in Japan and was used only for export. Local Japanese secret service under the controversial Imperial Japanese Army general Kenji Doihara, had control of their distribution in China and Manchuria, where the production was exported. In their mouthpieces, there were hidden small doses of opium or heroin and by this, millions of unsuspecting consumers were addicted into these narcotics, while creating huge profits. Mastermind of the plan, Doihara was later prosecuted and convicted for war crimes before the International Military Tribunal for the Far East sentenced him to death, but no actions ever took place against the company which profited from their production. According to a testimony presented at the Tokyo war crimes trials in 1948, the revenue from the narcotization policy in China, including Manchukuo, was estimated to be 20 to 30 million yen per year, while another authority stated that the annual revenue was estimated by the Japanese military at 300 million dollars a year.

== In popular culture ==
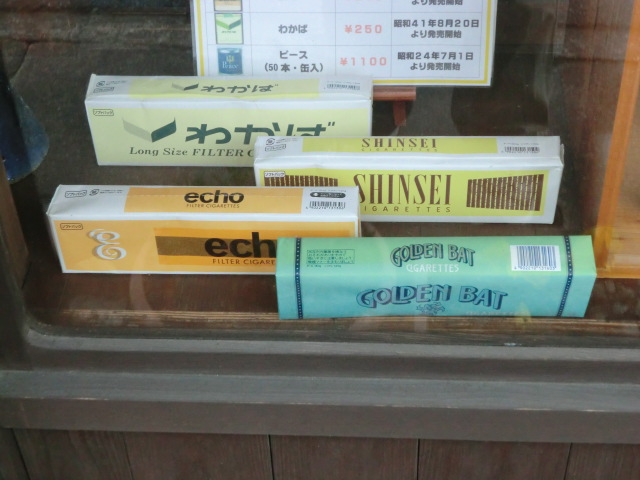
Various cartons of Japanese cigarettes, with Golden Bat displayed at the bottom

In habitual smokers of Golden Bat, there were some famous writers, and the name of "Bat" appears in their literary works. Well-known story writers Ryūnosuke Akutagawa, Osamu Dazai and Chūya Nakahara loved to smoke Golden Bat. Hyakken Uchida liked high-quality cigarettes, such as "Asahi" and "Peace", but he mentioned "Bat" as the cigarette he desired to smoke sometimes. The naturalist, Minakata Kumagusu also smoked Golden Bat, and he used its box as a specimen case of a slime germ he collected.

In 1931, 16-year old Takeo Nagamatsu and twenty-five year old Suzuki Ichiro created the golden skull headed superhero Ōgon Bat, naming him after the cigarette brand.

== See also ==
- Japan Tobacco
- Smoking in Japan
