= Hope (cigarette) =

Japanese cigarette brand

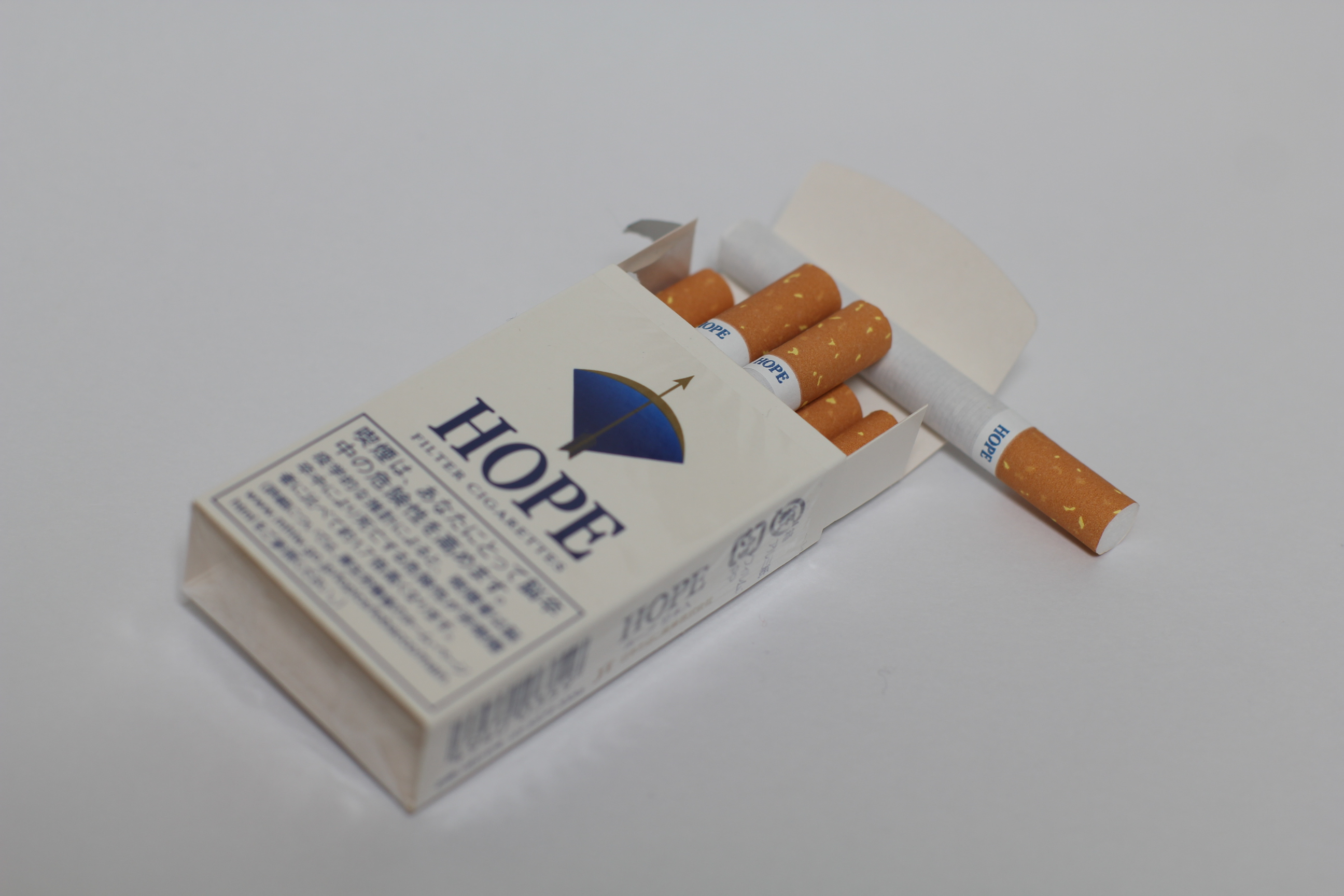
- A Japanese pack of Hope cigarettes, with a text warning displayed
- Product type: Cigarette
- Current owner: Japan Tobacco (Japan)
- Produced by: Japan Tobacco (Japan)
- Country: Empire of Japan
- Introduced: 1931; 95 years ago
- Discontinued: September 1940, re-introduced in July 1, 1957; 69 years ago
- Markets: Empire of Japan, Japan
- Previous owners: Japan Monopoly Corporation
- Tagline: "A new cigarette that made use of your dreams", "Persistent from the core", "SHORT IS GOOD", "HPM", "Choose! It was fun!" (Japan)

Hope is a Japanese brand of cigarettes produced by Japan Tobacco.

== History ==
Hope is a long-selling product familiar with the names of "Short Hope" and "Shoppo" (it is the official product name to put the number of entries per package in parentheses). There was a Hope brand with a similar name which was introduced in 1931 and existed until September 1940, after Emperor Hirohito forbade any foreign-named brands, Hope was relaunched in 1957, but it is not related to the pre-war Hope. It is the counterpart to Peace cigarettes

=== Packaging ===
The bow and arrow of the package design reference the bow and arrow used by the Roman mythical figure Cupid. The color of the bow and arrow and the brand name are navy blue, light uses the color red, super light uses the color monotone and menthol uses the color green.

The design of Hope packages has a smaller proportion of letters of "HOPE" of the logotype compared to the originally released packs, the proportion such as the serif portion is thick (minor change in mid-November 1995, at the same time Tar/nicotine, was 15 mg and 1.3 mg and was changed to 14 mg and 1.2 mg). Although other warning texts were inserted, it has kept the image since the introduction of the brand in 1957. This package was designed by Shirozu Shiozuka.

Hope Light was also released and, at the time of its launch, was adopted with a different design, unified design at the minor change of Hope in November 1995 (at the same time tar / nicotine values went from 11 mg of tar and 1.0 mg of nicotine to 9 mg of tar and 0.8 mg of nicotine), and the Super Lights and Menthol variants released after were the same as Hope, except that the color of the bow and arrow were different. Later, in September 2009, the Super Light was changed, instead of featuring the traditional silver arrows, it featured monotone to craft tones, and in October of that year the Light and Menthol variants also complied with the Super Light as it was renewed to a craft style package. At the same time, the Light adopted a charcoal filter and the taste had been changed.

The pack design was once again changed in February 2014, based on the design of Hope, the bow and arrow would be arranged in three dimensions and a shadow would be placed in the character of "HOPE". The design was once again unified with all 4 variants.

"Hope Dry Gold" which was released for a limited time from April 2014 (the whole pack was gold) as well as "Hope Sour Red" (which had an entirely red pack) which was also released for a limited time from November 2014. "Hope Hot Black" (which has an entirely black pack) and "Hope Passion Yellow" (the pack is entirely yellow) were also released for a limited time. The basic design is the same for other models, however, "Hot Black" and "Passion Yellow" were designed on the left side.

In addition, in the inner pack other than Hope, before the renewal in February 2014, a different illustration was drawn depending on the issue. For example, there was a hidden playful spirit such as a drawing of a drawing that a Samurai draws a bow and arrow, and a hand of a scissors was drawn. Cardboard was embossed in the initial package (different wrapping paper also varied depending on the brand name).

=== Products ===
Below are all the variants of Hope cigarettes, with the levels of tar and nicotine included.

Name	Release date	Date of discontinuance	Price in ¥	Tar (mg)	Nicotine (mg)	Description
Hope (10)	July 1, 1957	Still available	230 Yen	14	1.1	Navy / Plain filter
Hope (20)	July 1964	July 2002	260 Yen	20	1.7	Common name: Long Hope / King size.
Hope Light	March 2, 1992	Still available	230 Yen	9	0.8	Red / charcoal filter. Changes in taste from mid October 2009 and changed from plain filter to charcoal filter.
Hope Superlight	July 1, 2004 (Hokkaido only)	Still available	230 Yen	6	0.5	Monotone / charcoal filter. Expanding sales nationwide from April 25, 2005.
Hope Menthol	May 15, 2003 (Aichi Prefecture only)	Still available	230 Yen	8	0.6	Green / Plain filter. Expanding sales nationwide from May 2004.
Hope Dry Gold	April 2014	Around May 2014	230 Yen	12	1.0	Gold (whole box) / charcoal filter / limited release on sale (ginger flavor).
Hope Sour Red	April 2014	Around May 2014	230 Yen	8	0.7	Green Red (whole box) / charcoal filter / limited release on sale (cherry flavor).
Hope Hot Black	Early November 2014	Still available	230 Yen	9	0.8	Black (whole box / bow and arrow is vermillion) / charcoal filter / limited release on sale (spicy flavor).
Hope Passion Yellow	Early November 2014	Still available	230 Yen	6	0.5	Yellow (whole box / bow and arrow is orange) / charcoal filter / limited release on sale (passion fruit flavor)

Hope (20), which was once sold, was a soft package with a long size (later king size). It is known as "Long Hope". The mark of the bow and arrow of the package is red, close to vermillion and is slightly smaller than the current Hope. In addition, the logo type of this package is the difference between the normal one is Roman body "HOPE", and the difference is seen that it the "Century Gothic" and "hope". Despite the fact that all current Hope variants are of the same regular size, it is called "short hope" because of the existence of this former Hope (20). Nakajima's writers also love it, and they also appear during the work.

== See also ==
- Smoking in Japan
- Fashion brands
