= Seven Stars (cigarette) =

Japanese cigarette brand

- Two packs of Seven Stars cigarettes, with warning messages in Japanese at the bottom
- Product type: Cigarette
- Current owner: Japan Tobacco
- Produced by: Japan Tobacco
- Country: Japan
- Introduced: February 1, 1969; 57 years ago
- Markets: See Markets
- Tagline: See Slogans
- Website: sevenstars.clubjt.jp

Seven Stars (セブンスター, Sebun Sutā) is a brand of cigarettes produced by Japan Tobacco.

== History ==
Seven Stars was launched on February 1, 1969, as the first cigarette with a charcoal filter, and was created in response to customer demands for low-tar, menthol, and D-spec (low smoke smell) products. The brand uses domestically blended tobacco (mainly leaf tobacco), and is popular amongst all Japan Tobacco brands. From 1975 to 1977, it was the best-selling brand in Japan. Later, was ranked 2nd in sales following the 1977 launch of Mild Seven. From the first quarter of 2008 until 2016, the Seven Stars brand returned to best-selling status. Various nicknames for Seven Stars cigarettes include Setta (セッタ) and Sesta (セスタ).

Changes in the cigarettes' design have been made several times, but the 20-cigarette box has been largely unchanged since launch. 1993 saw a change in size to king size, some changes were made to the logo on the packs in 1999, and in early 2012, new inks and metallic finishes were applied to the packaging.

Since the beginning of the 21st century, low-tar and menthol variants are also sold; the latter, introduced on August 3, 2009, originally used a special charcoal filter to prevent covering and adsorption of the menthol, but this was changed to a plain filter on April 14, 2014. The tar content of the medium and light variants was lowered to 10 and 7 mg in the middle of June 2015, with the tar content label being displayed more prominently on the packaging.

Due to a tobacco tax increase on October 1, 2010, and consumption tax increase on April 1, 2014, the prices of all Seven Stars products were raised to 440 and 460 yen.

== Marketing ==
A tree used on a Seven Stars package became a scenic spot representative of the hills of Biei, Hokkaido.

In the mid-1990s and early 2000s, the brand was promoted by actors Etsushi Toyokawa, Tetta Sugimoto, and Shōei. From 2007 to 2011, music acts Boom Boom Satellites, The Lowbrows, and ripvanwinkle also participated in promoting the brand, including as part of magazine advertisements portraying them as "men who resonate with Seven Stars" (セブンスターと響きあう男たち, Sebun Sutā to Hibikiau Otokotachi).

=== Slogans ===
Seven Stars has used multiple different slogans, among them:

- "Indelible Man" (消せない男, Kesenai Otoko) (1996)
- "Silent Smoke" (1998–2001)
- "Seven Stars Man" (セブンスターの男, Sebun Sutā no Otoko) (2003)
- "Exalted, Quietly." (静かに、高ぶる。, Shizuka ni, Takaburu.) (2007–2011)
- "Just one thing: a certain taste." (ただひとつ、確かな味わい。, Tada hitotsu, tashikana ajiwai.) for original variants
- "Unwavering umami." (ゆずれない、うまさ。, Yuzurenai, umasa.) for medium variants
- "Polished umami." (研ぎ澄まされた、うまさ。, Togisumasareta, umasa.) for light variants
- "The choice is mellow." (極めたのは、芳醇。, Kiwameta no wa, hōjun.) for Real Rich variants
- "The choice is richness." (極めたのは、濃厚。, Kiwameta no wa, nōkō.) for Real Smoke variants
- "Menthol You Can Taste" (味わえるメンソール, Ajiwaeru Mensōru), "Solid, Super-Menthol" (ゆるぎない、強メンソール, Yuruginai, Kyō-mensōru), and "The flavour of ripe leaves, with menthol." (メンソールに、完熟葉の旨みを。, Mensōru ni, kanjukuba no umami wo.) for menthol variants
- "Superfine. Menthol is the sole focus." (極細。メンソール、一点集中。, Gokuboso. Mensōru, itten shūchū.) for Cutting Menthol variants
- "Japan's only. The sharp choice, charcoal menthol." (日本唯一。鋭さ極めた、チャコールメンソール。, Nihon yuiitsu. Surudosa kiwameta, chakōru-mensōru.) when the charcoal-filtered menthol variant was first released

Slogans for discontinued products include:

- "Black with a crisp, brilliant taste and an umami that stands out." (冴えるキレ味、うまさ際立つブラック。, Saeru kireaji, umasa kiwadatsu burakku.) for Black Impact
- "Piercing Super-Menthol." (突き刺さる、強メンソール。, Tsukisasaru, Kyō-mensōru.) for Light Menthol
- "Crisp flavour. Solid taste." (冴えるキレ味。ソリッドテイスト。, Saeru kireaji. Soriddo teisuto.) for Solid
- "Extreme coldness. Alaska Menthol." (過激な冷たさ。アラスカ・メンソール。, Kagekina tsumetasa. Arasuka Mensōru.) for Alaska Menthol
- "PLAY! SNAP" for the Snap Box

=== Markets ===
Seven Stars cigarettes are mainly sold in Japan, but also were or still are sold in Singapore, Austria, Ukraine and Afghanistan.

== Sponsorship ==
Seven Stars sponsored the Honda works team in the Suzuka 8 Hours motorcycle race from 2003 to 2006, where the team ran two bikes. In 2004, riders Tohru Ukawa and Izutsu Yoshiyasu claimed victory. Another win followed in 2005 with Ukawa and Ryuichi Kiyonari. Honda-themed Seven Stars packs were sold at Suzuka Circuit during the race.

== Products ==
- Seven Stars (Soft Pack/Box)
- Seven Stars Medium (Box)
- Seven Stars Lights (Box)
- Seven Stars Black Impact (Soft Pack)
- Seven Stars Menthol (Box)
- Seven Stars Lights Menthol (Soft Pack/Box)
- Seven Stars Black Charcoal Menthol (Box)
- Seven Stars Revo Lights Menthol
- Seven Stars Revo Super Lights

Below are all the variants of Seven Stars cigarettes, with the levels of tar and nicotine included.

Name	Release date	Date of discontinuance	Price in ¥	Tar	Nicotine	Description
Seven Stars	February 1, 1969	Still available	460 Yen	14 mg	1,2 mg	Hanshin Tigers package released in limited quantity in 2005. A Black Edition was released in 2008 as a limited package, and a Special edition was released in limited quantity in 2009.
Seven Stars EX	October 1, 1986	December 1993	240 Yen	14 mg	1,3 mg	In 1986, a King size version (85 mm) of the Seven Star was released. However, the leaf blend was different, using the American blend of the Mild Seven rather than the domestic blend. In addition, the tar value was lowered by 1 mg and the nicotine value was increased by 0.1 mg in comparison to the Seven Star. Abolished with Seven Star's 1993 King size
Seven Stars 10 Box	May 1, 1990	Still available	460 Yen	10 mg	0,8 mg	A custom light box with golden top was released circa October 2008. Referred to as the Seven Star Medium Box from November 2008 to June 2014.
Seven Stars Custom Light	November 1, 1993	October 1995	240 Yen	11 mg	1,0 mg	Soft pack, de facto revival as Seven Stars 10 in July 2014
Seven Stars Box	August 1, 1995	Still available	460 Yen	14 mg	1,2 mg	A limited edition side slide box was released in limited quantity in 2007.
Seven Stars Menthol Box	August 1, 2000	Late February 2011	440 Yen	12 mg	0,8 mg	Successor to the Seven Stars Deep Menthol Box. A limited edition side slide box was released in limited quantities in 2007 and 2009.
Seven Stars Menthol Light Box	June 4, 2001	October 31, 2008	300 Yen	8 mg	0,6 mg	Tar value unification with light menthol of soft pack with standard change
Seven Stars 7 Box	July 1, 2004	Still available	460 Yen	7 mg	0,7 mg	The name of the Seven Stars Light Box until June 2014. The box top was silver. At its launch in 2004, it was limited to the Fukuoka prefecture, but the next year, it expanded its sales area to the national level.
Seven Stars Levo Light Menthol Box	February 1, 2005	January 2011	440 Yen	7 mg	0,6 mg	D-spec Seven Star Menthol leaves are used.
Seven Stars Revo Super Light Box	July 1, 2005	January 2011	440 Yen	5 mg	0,5 mg	D-spec lights and custom light leaves are used.
Seven Stars Levo Ultra Light Menthol Box	January 16, 2006	January 2009	320 Yen	3 mg	0,2 mg	
Seven Stars Light Menthol	February 4, 2008	May 2011	440 Yen	7 mg	0,6 mg	A special edition was released in 2009 in limited quantity. The box top is yellow green.
Seven Stars Light Menthol Box	November 1, 2008	May 2011	440 Yen	7 mg	0,6 mg	The name and taste were changed in November 2008 (soft pack and unified). A limited edition side slide box was released in limited quantity in 2009. Until October 2008, the box top was silver with the name Menthol Light, but it was replaced with a yellow green top.
Seven Stars Alaska Menthol Box	December 2, 2008	May 2014	440 Yen	5 mg	0,4 mg	Successor to the Seven Stars Menthol 5 Box. In October 2011, the brand changed to Salem Alaska Menthol. It uses a plain filter with flavored threads (featuring a triple mint recipe, blending peppermint, corn mint, and spearmint).
Seven Stars Black Impact	February 2, 2009	May 2011	440 Yen	7 mg	0,7 mg	It was released as a 40th anniversary commemoration release.
Seven Stars Black Charcoal Menthol Box	August 3, 2009	Late February 2011	440 Yen	7 mg	0,6 mg	Successor to the Seven Stars Solid Menthol Box. Japan's first menthol charcoal filter.
Seven Stars Black Impact Box	April 1, 2010	Late February 2011	440 Yen	7 mg	0,7 mg	Successor to the Seven Stars Solid Box.
Seven Stars Deep Menthol Box	Late February 2011	May 2014	440 Yen	12 mg	0,9 mg	Successor to the Seven Stars Menthol 12 Box. The filter was changed from a plain filter to a charcoal filter, and the nicotine value increased from 0.8 mg to 0.9 mg.
Seven Stars Solid Menthol Box	Late February 2011	May 2014	440 Yen	7 mg	0,6 mg	Successor to the Seven Stars Menthol 8 Box.
Seven Stars Solid Box	Late February 2011	July 2014	460 Yen	7 mg	0,7 mg	Successor to the Seven Stars Black Impact Box.
Seven Stars Cutting Menthol	August 29, 2011	February 2017	460 Yen	7 mg	0,6 mg	Seven Star's first super slim product. It uses a plain filter with flavored threads.
Seven Stars Menthol Snap Box	September 3, 2012	May 2014	440 Yen	7 mg	0,7 mg	
Seven Stars Real Rich	December 2, 2013	Still available	460 Yen	14 mg'	1,2 mg	The package is deep red.
Seven Stars Real Rich	December 2, 2013	Still available	460 Yen	14 mg'	1,2 mg	The package is black.
Seven Stars 1	July 1, 2014	Still available	460 Yen	1 mg	0,1 mg	
Seven Stars 4	July 1, 2014	Still available	460 Yen	4 mg	0,4 mg	
Seven Stars 7	July 1, 2014	Still available	460 Yen	7 mg	0,7 mg	
Seven Stars 10	July 1, 2014	Still available	460 Yen	7 mg	0,7 mg	
Seven Stars Menthol 5 Box	April 14, 2014	Still available	460 Yen	5 mg	0,5 mg	Successor to the Seven Stars Alaska Menthol Box. The flavored threaded filter was changed to a plain filter, and the flavor blend was altered.
Seven Stars Menthol 8 Box	April 14, 2014	Still available	460 Yen	8 mg	0,7 mg	Successor to the Seven Stars Solid Menthol Box. The charcoal filter was changed to a plain filter, the tar value increased from 7 mg to 8 mg, and the nicotine value increased from 0.6 mg to 0.7 mg.
Seven Stars Menthol 12 Box	April 14, 2014	Still available	460 Yen	12 mg	0,9 mg	Successor to the Seven Stars Deep Menthol Box. The charcoal filter was changed to a plain filter
Seven Stars Menthol Beat 8 Box	September 25, 2015	Still available	460 Yen	8 mg	0,6 mg	
Seven Stars Menthol Smash 8 Box	September 25, 2015	Still available	460 Yen	8 mg	0,6 mg	It features a capsule that can be crushed to change the scent from menthol to lemon-apple.
Seven Stars Long Time 6 Box	January 15, 2016	Still available	480 Yen	6 mg	0,6 mg	
Seven Stars Long Time 10 Box	January 15, 2016	Still available	480 Yen	10 mg	1,0 mg	
Seven Stars Long Time Menthol 8 Box	January 15, 2016	Still available	480 Yen	8 mg	0,7 mg	

== See also ==
- Smoking in Japan
- Fashion brands
