= Caster (cigarette) =

Japanese cigarette brand

- Two Japanese packs of Caster cigarettes with a text warning at the bottom of the pack
- Product type: Cigarette
- Current owner: Japan Tobacco
- Produced by: Japan Tobacco
- Country: See Markets
- Introduced: July 1, 1982; 44 years ago
- Discontinued: November 2016
- Markets: Japan
- Tagline: "For an even more Caster-like taste", "Me, I like the taste"

Caster was a Japanese brand of cigarettes that was owned and manufactured by Japan Tobacco.

== History ==
The first Caster variant was launched on July 1, 1982 by the former "Nippon Monopoly Corporation".

Tobacco used in Caster cigarettes also used vanilla from Madagascar (Caster Frontier used chocolate fragrance). Over time, other variants were also introduced, such as Caster Mild, Caster Super Mild and Caster One.

In 2003, Caster Super Mild was released in Hiroshima prefecture with a limited edition design that emphasized the initial letter "C" of Caster. In the summer of 2004, the 5-packs of Caster cigarettes were renewed, but the Mild and Super Mild packs were not renewed and were still using the old design.

In December 2007, all Caster variants got a new design, and the old logo and emblem were restored.

In early April 2010, "D-spec" (a low-odor cigarette) was introduced.

Caster Mild is the most popular variant, sometimes abbreviated as "Casemai" in Japanese.

After the 2011 Tōhoku earthquake and tsunami struck Japan, Japan Tobacco announced they would stop selling the Caster One, and Caster Menthol variants. However, the original duty-free shop only packs of Caster Classic were renewed and were sold again.

The pack design changed again around the beginning of August 2012, as the emblem designed on the upper left became bigger. In addition, "Frontier Light" was integrated into the Caster brand and renewed to "Caster Frontier One" (here the "D-spec" was not yet introduced, and the filter was also a common charcoal filter. The product was a dual charcoal filter bundle). In addition, it was renamed as "ERR 1" at the time of transition to the Winston brand.

In 2015, all Caster products except one were merged with the Winston brand, leaving only Gold Silk as the only remaining brand of Cigarette with the name Caster on it. Eventually, Gold Silk was also discontinued in November 2016.

== Advertisement ==
In the 1980s, Japan Tobacco created various poster advertisements in which actor Tatsuya Fuji appeared. "Me, I like the taste" was a slogan he used in those adverts.

In the 1990s, some television advertisements were also made to promote Caster cigarettes.

Some old telephone cards also had Caster advertisements on them.

== Markets ==
Caster cigarettes were mainly sold in Japan, but were also sold in Singapore, Taiwan and South Korea.

== Products ==
Below are all the variants of Caster cigarettes, with the levels of tar and nicotine included.

Name	Release date	Date of discontinuance	Price in ¥	Tar	Nicotine	Description
Caster Original	July 1, 1982	May 2011 (In duty-free shops around July 2012)	410 Yen	7 mg	0,6 mg	
Caster Special	April 1, 1984	July 1992	240 Yen	8 mg	0,7 mg	Released as a King size version of a Caster that was long size at the time (the tobacco blend is somewhat different). Due to the king size it was later discontinued.
Caster Special Box	January 1, 1988	October 1994	240 Yen	8 mg	0,8 mg	Released as a King size version of a Caster that was long size at the time (the tobacco blend is somewhat different). Due to the king size it was later discontinued.
Caster Mild	October 1, 1988	November 2015	420 Yen	5 mg	0,4 mg	Nickname: SYMPHONIC. Changed to "Winston XS Caster 5"
Caster Bevel	September 1, 1990	November 2015	250 Yen	8 mg	0,7 mg	Since September 1995, it became the Bevel brand.
Caster Mild Box	October 1, 1992	November 2015	420 Yen	5 mg	0,4 mg	Nickname: SYMPHONIC. Changed to "Winston XS Caster 5"
Caster Frontier One Box	February 1, 1993	November 2015	420 Yen	1 mg	0,1 mg	In August 2012, it was moved from frontier light box of the frontier brand. The release date is the total from the frontier. Changed to "Winston XS Caster F One Box"
Caster Box	January 5, 1995	October 2003	280 Yen	8 mg	0,7 mg	In duty-free shops renamed and sold again as "Caster Classic Box"
Caster Super Mild Box	December 1, 1995	November 2015	420 Yen	3 mg	0,3 mg	Nickname: HARMONIC. Changed to "Winston XS Caster 3 Box"
Caster One 100's Box	December 2, 1996	November 2015	420 Yen	1 mg	0,1 mg	Nickname: MELODIC. Changed to "Winston XS Caster One 100's Box"
Caster Mild Pure Box	October 1, 1997	June 2002	270 Yen	6 mg	0,5 mg	Products with less smoke before D-spec
Caster One Box	January 11, 1999	August 2015	420 Yen	1 mg	0,1 mg	Nickname: MELODIC
Caster One	December 1, 2000	May 2011	410 Yen	1 mg	0,1 mg	Soft pack
Caster Super Mild	September 1, 2003	November 2015	420 Yen	3 mg	0,3 mg	Nickname: HARMONIC. Changed to "Winston XS Caster 3"
Caster Classic Box	Around August 2012	November 2015	2600 Yen (10 packs)	7 mg	0,6 mg	Sold in duty-free shops only. Once sold as "Caster Box". Changed to "Winston XS Caster 7 Box" around the Spring of 2016
Caster Gold Silk 6 Box	Early December 2014	November 2016	440 Yen	6 mg	0,6 mg	Premium items that emphasize mellowness by microfabrication method
Caster Bevel Menthol	June 2, 1992	September 1995	250 Yen	8 mg	0,7 mg	Since September 1995, it became Bevelle bever, light and menthol and was sold until June 2003
Caster Menthol Box	July 1, 2004	May 2011	410 Yen	3 mg	0,3 mg	Initially called "Caster Cool Vanilla Menthol Box"

== See also ==
- Japan Tobacco
- Smoking in Japan
- Fashion brands
