= Sakura (cigarette) =

Japan Tobacco brand (2005–2011)

- A pack of Japanese Sakura cigarettes with a health warning displayed
- Product type: Cigarette
- Current owner: Japan Tobacco
- Produced by: Japan Tobacco
- Country: Japan
- Introduced: February 1, 2005; 21 years ago
- Discontinued: 2011
- Markets: Japan, Russia

Sakura was a Japanese brand of cigarettes that was owned and manufactured by Japan Tobacco.

== History ==
The cigarette was launched on February 1, 2005, with limited sales beginning in the Kagoshima and Miyazaki prefectures. The new Sakura cigarette was designed with lower tar values and the introduction of D-spec. However, the pack design and basic elements remained unchanged.

The old cherry blossom variant was discontinued after January 2006.

After that, a "D-spec" (low smoke smell) version of Sakura was sold in the Kanagawa Prefecture only on October 2, 2006 (5 other JTI brands were simultaneously sold in this limited area).

New cherry blossoms were discontinued as of January, 2011 due to poor sales.

They were of traditional Japanese cigarette sizes: short (70 mm), king size (85 mm) or long (100 mm). They came within a soft or hard pack, 10 or 20 cigarettes per pack.

== Products ==
- Sakura Cherry Blossoms (old)
- Sakura Cherry Blossoms (new)

Below are all the variants of Pianissimo cigarettes, with the levels of tar and nicotine included.

Name	Release date	Date of discontinuance	Price in ¥	Tar	Nicotine	Description
Sakura Cherry Blossoms (old)	February 1, 2005	January 2006	300 Yen	10 mg	0,8 mg	Non charcoal filter
Sakura Cherry Blossoms (new)	October 2, 2006	January 2011	470 Yen	7 mg	0,6 mg	D-spec product

== See also ==
- Smoking in Japan
- Fashion brands
