= Pianissimo Peche =

Japanese cigarette brand

- A photo of a vending machine containing the peach flavoured cigarettes.
- Product type: Cigarette
- Current owner: Japan Tobacco
- Produced by: Japan Tobacco
- Country: Japan
- Introduced: June 2004; 22 years ago
- Markets: Japan

Pianissimo is a Japanese brand of cigarettes, currently owned and manufactured by Japan Tobacco.

== Description ==
Originally it was sold as a light variant of the Salem brand in 1995 which was made by the R. J. Reynolds Tobacco Company. Japan Tobacco acquired the overseas division of RJR and made the Pianissimo brand independent in June 2004. It was first launched and tested in July 2005 in the Miyagi (宮城) and Yamagata (山形) prefectures, and then introduced nationwide in October 2005. Since May 1, 2005, Japan Tobacco handles stocks. Since then, other variants like Petil and Franc were added and other Japan Tobacco Menthol brands were made into Pianissimo. It is a cigarette specifically aimed at women, similar to Virginia S made by Altria,

The word Pianissimo refers to the musical dynamics and volumes of sounds or notes. The word pêche is a French term meaning peach, referring to the peach taste of the cigarettes. Produced and sold almost exclusively in Japan, the cigarettes are sold as 20 cigarettes per pack, 10 packs per carton, and 200 cigarettes per carton.

In December 2011, JTI announced they had changed 7 Pianissimo variants. The same thing happened to 9 variants in mid-2016.

== Products ==
Below are all the variants of Pianissimo cigarettes, with the levels of tar and nicotine included.

Name	Release date	Date of discontinuance	Price in ¥	Tar	Nicotine	Description
Pianissimo Lucia Menthol	February 1, 2003	Still available	450 Yen	5 mg	0,3 mg	D-spec product ( citrus flavor)
Pianissimo Eye Scene Gracia	August 1, 2003	Still available	450 Yen	5 mg	0,4 mg	D-spec product, changed from "Pianissimo Eye Scene Menthol" in mid January 2012 (Strong Menthol)
Pianissimo Aria Menthol	June 1, 2004	Still available	450 Yen	1 mg	0,1 mg	Since March 2006 D-spec, changed to "Pianissimo One" in mid January 2012 (Mensol without habit)
Pianissimo Light	June 1, 2004	August 2006	320 Yen	6 mg	0,5 mg	Since March 2006 D-spec
Pianissimo Ultra Light	June 1, 2004	May 2011	440 Yen	3 mg	0,2 mg	Since March 2006 D-spec
Pianissimo Petil Menthol One	July 1, 2005	Still available	450 Yen	1 mg	0,1 mg	D-spec product, until the beginning of May 2009, changed to "Pianissimo Peche Menthol One" ( Peach flavor )
Pianissimo Franc Menthol One	October 1, 2008	Still available	230 Yen	1 mg'	0,1 mg	D-spec product (raspberry flavor)
Pianissimo Eye Scene Crista	December 1, 2009	Still available	450 Yen	1 mg'	0,1 mg	D-spec product (raspberry flavor)
Pianissimo Peche Menthol	November 1, 2010	Still available	450 Yen	1 mg'	0,1 mg	D-spec product, changed to 'Pianissimo Eye Scene Menthol One' in mid January 2012 (Strong Menthol)
Pianissimo Vive Menthol	November 1, 2011	May 2014	450 Yen	6 mg'	0,5 mg	D-spec product (refreshing menthol of mint type → strong menthol with moderate sweetness)
Pianissimo Peche Dia Menthol	30 July 2012	Still available	450 Yen	5 mg	0.3 mg	D-spec product (strong menthol feel and firm respiration) The tar / nicotine value has been changed.
Pianissimo Eye Scene Spike	January 14, 2014	Still available	450 Yen	6 mg	0,5 mg	D-spec product, King size. Virtually succeeding Pianississimo Viv Menthol, the product with the first eye scene after the integration of eye scene

== See also ==
- Fashion brands
- Smoking in Japan
