= Tobacco and Salt Museum =

Museum in Tokyo, Japan

Tobacco & Salt Museum
- たばこと塩の博物館
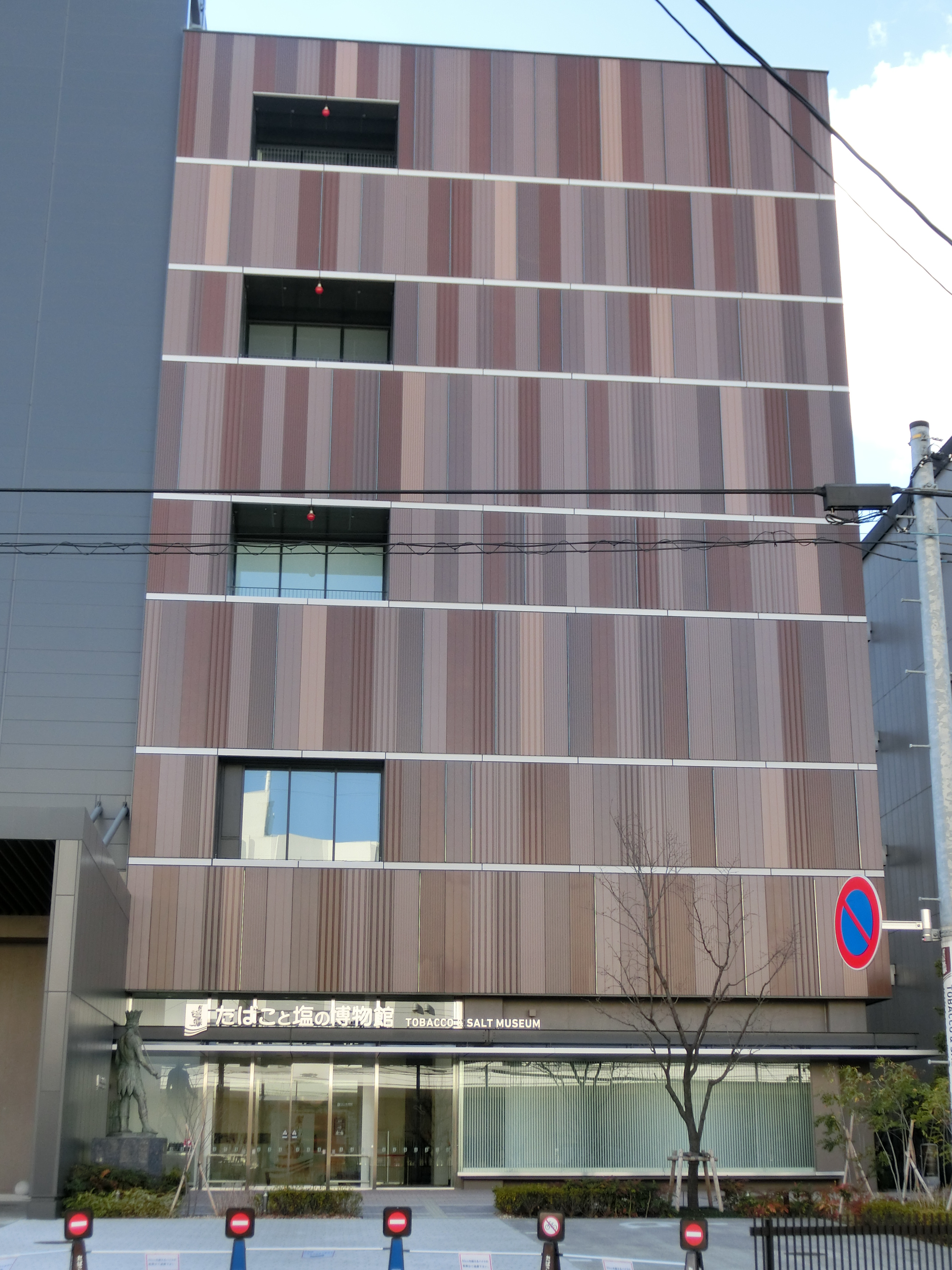
- Tobacco & Salt Museum
- Location: Tokyo, Japan
- Coordinates: 35°42′20.9″N 139°48′30.7″E

The Tobacco and Salt Museum (Japanese:たばこと塩の博物館) is located in Sumida-ku, Tokyo. It was established in 1978 and is run by Japan Tobacco. The museum was originally located in Shibuya but, in 2015, it was relocated to Sumida. The museum has about 38,000 artifacts that show the history of tobacco and salt both from Japan and overseas. It holds a 1.4 tonne block of rock salt from Poland along with other blocks of rock salts that have been brought from various parts of world. There is a replica of a Mayan shrine from South America to show where tobacco was first used.

The museum also has a ventilated smoking room, a workshop room, a reading room and a museum shop.
