= Zero Style Mint =

Brand of Japanese cigarette

Zero Style Mint (Katakana: ゼロ・スタイル・ミント) is a brand of smokeless cigarette produced by Japan Tobacco. Zero Style Mint consists of a cigarette-shaped pipe into which a small, snuff-like tobacco cartridge is inserted. A set of a stick and two cartridges are priced at 300 Japanese yen and are sold only in Tokyo; sets of four refill cartridges sell for 400 yen.
