= Japan Tobacco =

Japanese cigarette manufacturing company

Japan Tobacco Inc.

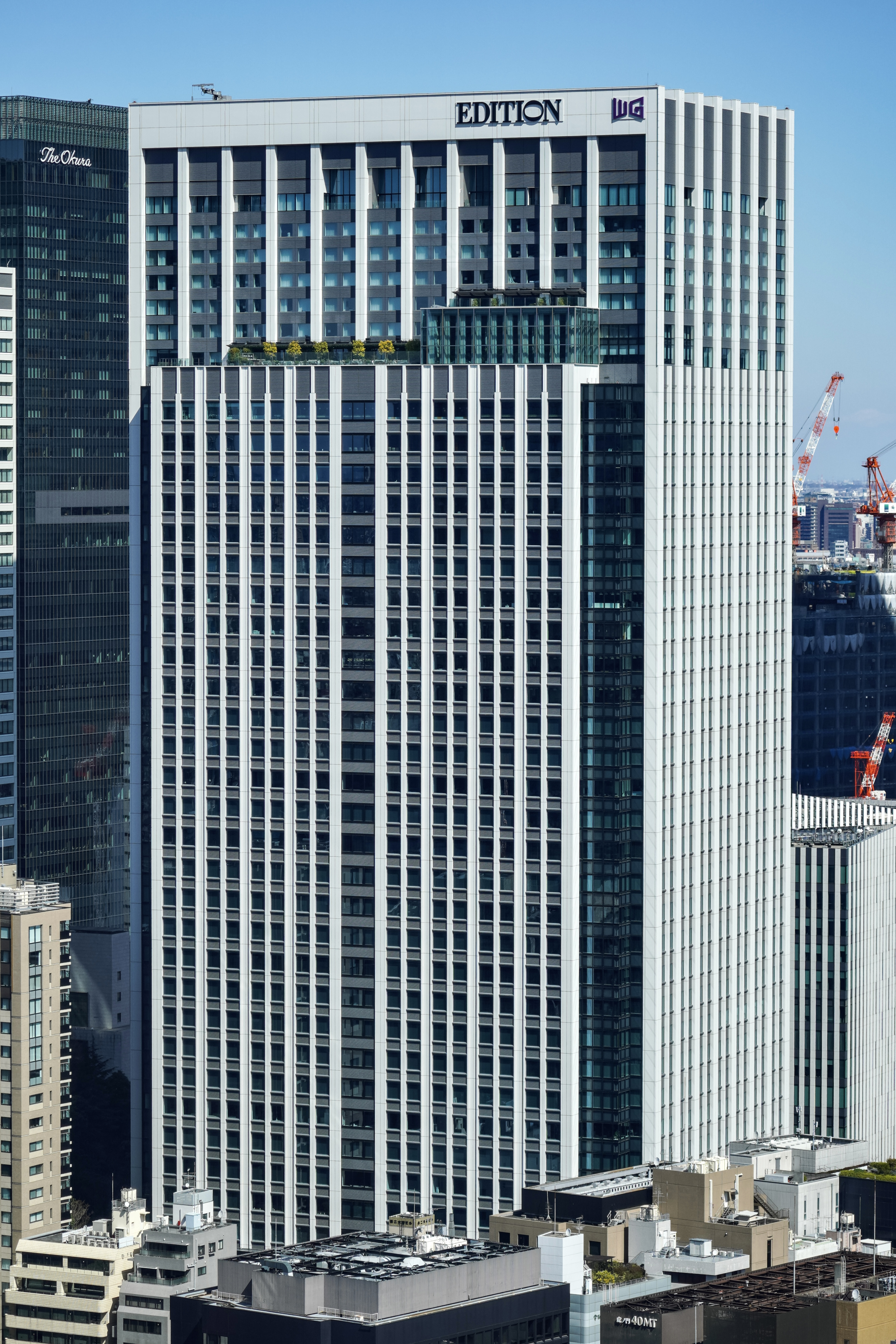
- Headquarters in Tokyo
- Native name: 日本たばこ産業株式会社
- Romanized name: Nihon Tabako Sangyō kabushiki gaisha
- Type: Public
- Traded as: TYO: 2914; Nikkei 225 component; TOPIX Large70 component
- Industry: Food; Tobacco
- Predecessor: Japan Tobacco and Salt Public Corporation
- Founded: April 1, 1985; 41 years ago (privatized)
- Headquarters: 2-1, Toranomon, Minato, Tokyo, Japan
- Key people: Masamichi Terabatake (president and CEO); Hiroshi Kimura (chairman)
- Products: See below
- Revenue: ▲¥2.033 trillion (2012)
- Operating income: ▲¥459.18 billion (2012)
- Net income: ▲¥328.55 billion (2012)
- Total assets: ▼¥3.667 trillion (2012)
- Total equity: ▼¥1.714 trillion (2012)
- Owner: Ministry of Finance (37.57% by law)
- Number of employees: 48,529 (2011)
- Subsidiaries: Japan Tobacco International; PT Karya Dibya Mahardhika (Indonesia); Mighty Corporation (Philippines); JTI Germany (with Russian daughter company); Gallaher Group
- Website: https://www.jti.co.jp

Japan Tobacco Inc. (Note: Japanese: 日本たばこ産業株式会社, Hepburn: Nihon Tabako Sangyō kabushiki gaisha) (JT) is a Japanese diversified tobacco company and parent company to Japan Tobacco International, one of the three largest international Big Tobacco product manufacturers in the world. It was established in 1985 as a tokushu gaisha (Note: 特殊会社; lit. 'special company') that inherited the right to monopolize and manufacture cigarettes from the Japan Tobacco and Salt Public Corporation (Note: 日本専売公社, Nippon Senbai Kōsha; lit. "Japan Monopoly Public Corporation") and required the government to hold at least 50% of its shares. In addition to tobacco, JT diversified its businesses, establishing the pharmaceutical research institute in 1993 and making a full-scale entry into the food and beverage industry in 1998. In 2008, it acquired the food manufacturer Katokichi, now TableMark, as a wholly owned subsidiary, integrating its food business.

It is part of the Nikkei 225 and TOPIX Large70 indices. In 2009, the company was listed at number 312 on the Fortune 500 list. The company is headquartered in Toranomon, Minato, Tokyo, and Japan Tobacco International's headquarters are in Geneva, Switzerland. As of 2012 the chairman is Hiroshi Kimura and the CEO is Mitsuomi Koizumi.

== History ==
Japan Tobacco is the successor entity to a nationalized tobacco monopoly first established by the Government of Japan in 1898 to secure tax revenue collections from tobacco leaf sales. In 1904, the government's leaf monopoly was extended completely to take over all tobacco business operations in the nation, including all manufactured tobacco products such as cigarettes. The ostensible reason for the expansion of control was to help fund the 1904–1905 Russo-Japanese War, but because all foreign tobacco interests in Japan at the time were forcibly evicted under the monopolization scheme, this also protected the domestic tobacco business for the following eighty years.

The business operated within the Japanese government as an arm of the nation's Japanese Ministry of Finance until 1949 when the Japan Tobacco and Salt Public Corporation was established to enforce restrictive labor relations policies under the U.S. and allied forces' Occupation of Japan. The Japan Tobacco and Salt Public Corporation remained a complete state monopoly under direct Japanese Ministry of Finance authority until 1985, when Japan Tobacco, Inc. was formed as a publicly traded stock company. Periodic incremental sales of share to the public began in October 1994.

Japan Tobacco became two-thirds owned by the Japanese Ministry of Finance in June 2003, and the ministry continued to own 50% until March 2013. It was announced in May 2012 that the government would sell one-sixth of the company's outstanding shares to raise ¥500 billion to finance reconstruction from the 2011 earthquake and tsunami.

In 2013 the Japanese government disclosed the details of its plans to reduce its equity interest in Japan Tobacco by $10 billion, devoting the proceeds to reconstruction in northeastern Japan. The ministry of finance sold the stock in March 2013, selling about 333 million of the 1 billion shares it owned at that time. The government remains required by law to own at least one-third of JT's stock.

== JT today ==
Japan Tobacco has 66% of the cigarette market in Japan. Although tobacco consumption is declining, the Japanese remain heavy smokers, consuming an average of 1,800 cigarettes per capita in 2013, compared to about 1,000 per capita in the United States. The Japanese government aimed to reduce cigarette smoking rates among adults to 12% over the next 10 years, starting from 2012.

In April 2012 it was announced that Mitsuomi Koizumi would become president, and president Hiroshi Kimura would become chairman of JT. and Chairman Yoji Wakui would retire. Wakui had previously been a bureaucrat at the ministry of finance. Koizumi assuming the presidency meant that for the first time since the 1985 privatization neither president nor chairman was from the Ministry of Finance. Koizumi, who had been Executive Deputy President, became president in June 2012.

On 30 October 2013 JT announced that it would close four Japanese factories and cut 1,600 jobs in Japan through voluntary retirements. This was planned to be completed by March 2016. JT also planned to consolidate 25 branch offices into 15 regional headquarters, and close leaf-processing and vending machine operations.

Japan Tobacco also operates in foods, pharmaceuticals, agribusiness, engineering, and real estate. It left the beverage industry in September 2015. As part of the company's pharma activities, it divested a compound collection of potassium channel inhibitors to Metrion Biosciences in 2018. In its processed food business, key products include Sanuki Udon frozen noodles and HIMAX yeast extract.

== Japan Tobacco International ==
Final logo of the Japan Tobacco and Salt Public Corporation until its privatization in 1985

JT International (JTI), acquired in 1999 from R.J. Reynolds, is an operating division of Japan Tobacco Inc., and produces, markets and sells the group's cigarette brands internationally. It sells Camel, Salem, and Winston brands outside the USA. Japan Tobacco completed the largest ever foreign takeover in Japanese history through acquisition of Gallaher Group plc in April 2007. Japan Tobacco runs the Tobacco and Salt Museum in Sumida-ku, Tokyo.

In 2006/2007 Japan Tobacco planned to start Serbia production, and also planned to invest another $100 million. JT paid "$35 million euros" [sic] for 98.5 percent of Senta Tobacco Industry in May 2006, with a further $10 million invested since then. The plant has a production capacity of some five billion cigarettes a year.

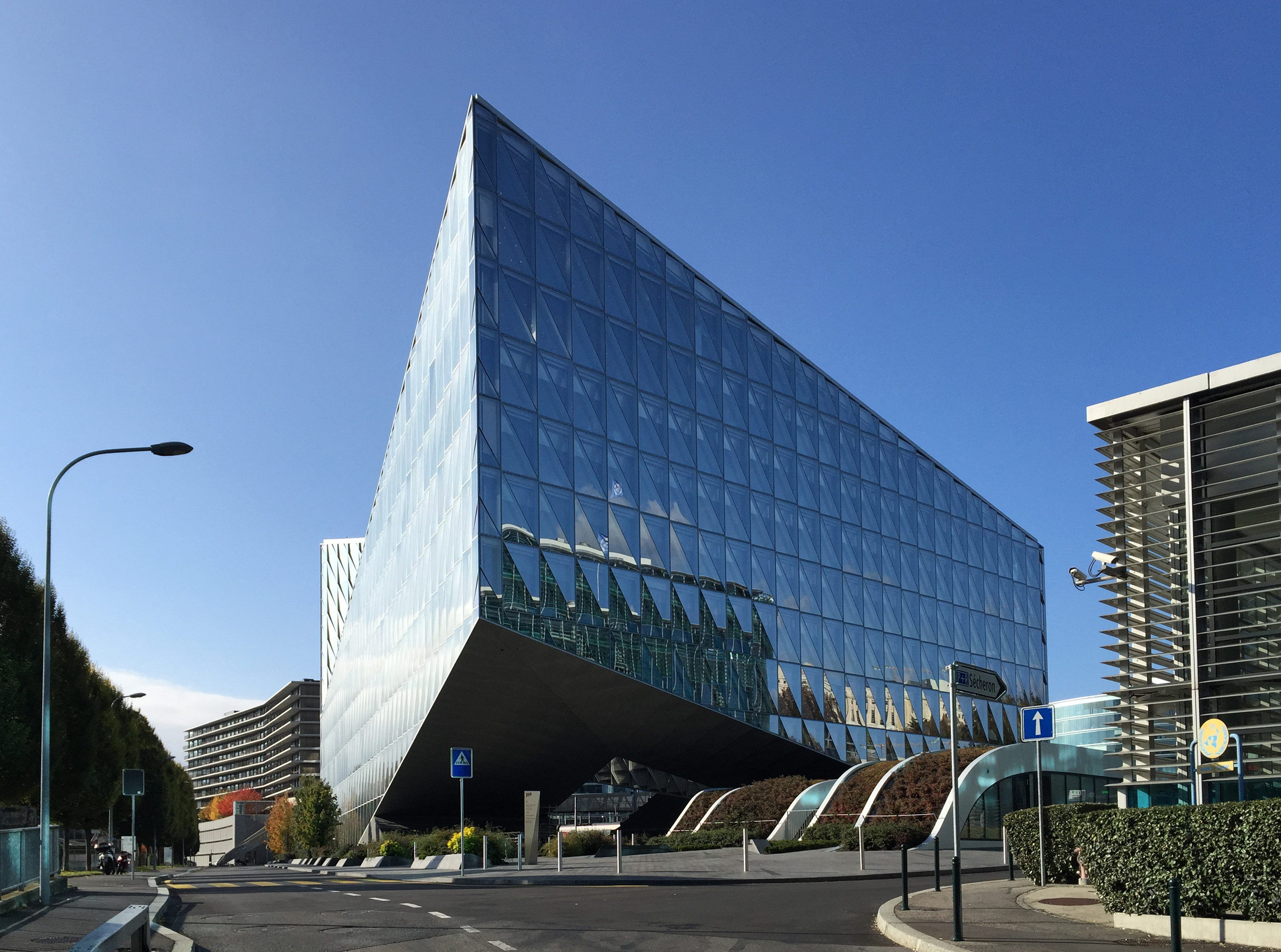
Japan Tobacco International Geneva Office

On 12 June 2014 JT concluded an agreement to acquire all outstanding shares of British e-cigarettes producer Zandera Ltd, best known for its E-Lites brand. On 30 April 2015 JT announced it had agreed to buy Florida-based e-cigarette maker Logic Technology Development LLC.

In September 2015 it was announced that JT would buy the rights for Natural American Spirit outside the US for $5 billion. In August 2017, the company announced it would acquire the Indonesian Kretek producers Karyadibya Mahardhika and Surya Mustika Nusantara from Gudang Garam for $677 million. PT Karya Dibya Mahardhika has a main brand in Indonesia, Apache, Extreme Mild, & Minna International. After that, the Philippines' Mighty Corporation for $936 million. In 2018, JT acquired Donskoy Tabak corporation, Russia's fourth largest cigarette manufacturer for $1.6 billion.

On November 5, 2026, by a decree of the President of the Russian Federation, the company’s Russian assets were placed under "temporary external management". The expected loss for Japan Tobacco was USD 8,9 Billion.

== Lawsuits ==
There have been a number of Japanese court cases related to smoking, either directly or indirectly related to JT.

=== 1980–1987 JNR Shinkansen lawsuit ===
A group of nonsmokers sued at the Tokyo District Court demanding that Japanese National Railways shinkansen (bullet trains) provide more non-smoking cars. The case was filed in 1980 and while the court recognized tobacco's health risks the 27 March 1987 ruling rejected the lawsuit on the basis that the plaintiffs had failed to prove their harm to be "beyond the limits of toleration".

=== 1998–2005 Tokyo lawsuit ===
In 1998 seven plaintiffs represented by lawyer Yoshio Isayama sued JT at the Tokyo District Court for ¥70 million compensation (¥10 million per plaintiff) for health damage caused by smoking JT cigarettes. While similar cases had been filed in Nagoya, this was the first such case in Tokyo. In addition to financial compensation, the plaintiffs also demanded:

- That tobacco sales through vending machines be banned;
- That advertising on television and radio be stopped;
- That promotions at public and sports events be halted;
- That a more stringent warning label be printed on cigarette boxes.

The plaintiffs' case was dismissed by the district court on 21 October 2003. The court agreed with the 1980s ruling that tobacco had health risks, but said that there was no causal link between the smoking habits and the specific diseases of plaintiffs. In addition, Judge Kikuo Asaka denied that nicotine was highly addictive. Isayama said that the group would appeal the decision to the Tokyo High Court.

On 22 June 2005 the Tokyo High Court dismissed the case; by that time brought by only six plaintiffs. Three of the plaintiffs had died during the course of the case. Judge Toshinobu Akiyama said he agreed with the District Court decision. Jun Araki, the son of one of the deceased plaintiffs, said: "This ruling placed priority on the annual 2.3 trillion yen in [tobacco] tax revenue over the precious lives and health of the Japanese people". He also said the plaintiffs would appeal to the Supreme Court.

=== 2005–2010 Yokohama lawsuit ===
In January 2005 plaintiffs Kenichi Morishita, Koreyoshi Takahashi, and Masanobu Mizuno filed a case in the Yokohama District Court against JT seeking ¥30 million in damages for smoking related illness. Morishita died of pneumonia while the case was being fought, and JT used the same argument as in the 1998–2005 Tokyo case, that smokers were free to quit any time and that cancer and other illnesses had multiple causes.

On 20 January 2010 the court clearly ruled that there was a link between smoking and lung cancer and respiratory illnesses, and said that smoking may be addictive. However, the court rejected the demand for damages, and said that the plaintiffs had smoked of their own free will and that there was no proof that smoking had directly caused their sicknesses.

== Brands ==
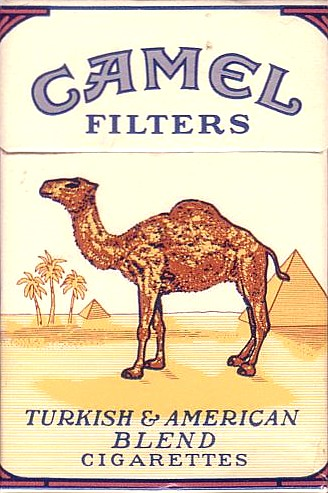
Camel Cigarettes

=== Flagship brands ===
- Cabin
- Camel (outside the USA)
- Caster
- Hope
- Mevius
- Peace
- Pianissimo Peche
- Sakura
- Salem (outside the USA)
- Seven Stars
- Winston (outside the USA)
- Camel Mild (Kretek)
- Camel Purple
- Hamlet
  Winston
- Ploom
  Benson & Hedges (with Philip Morris International, British American Tobacco, and Gallaher Group)

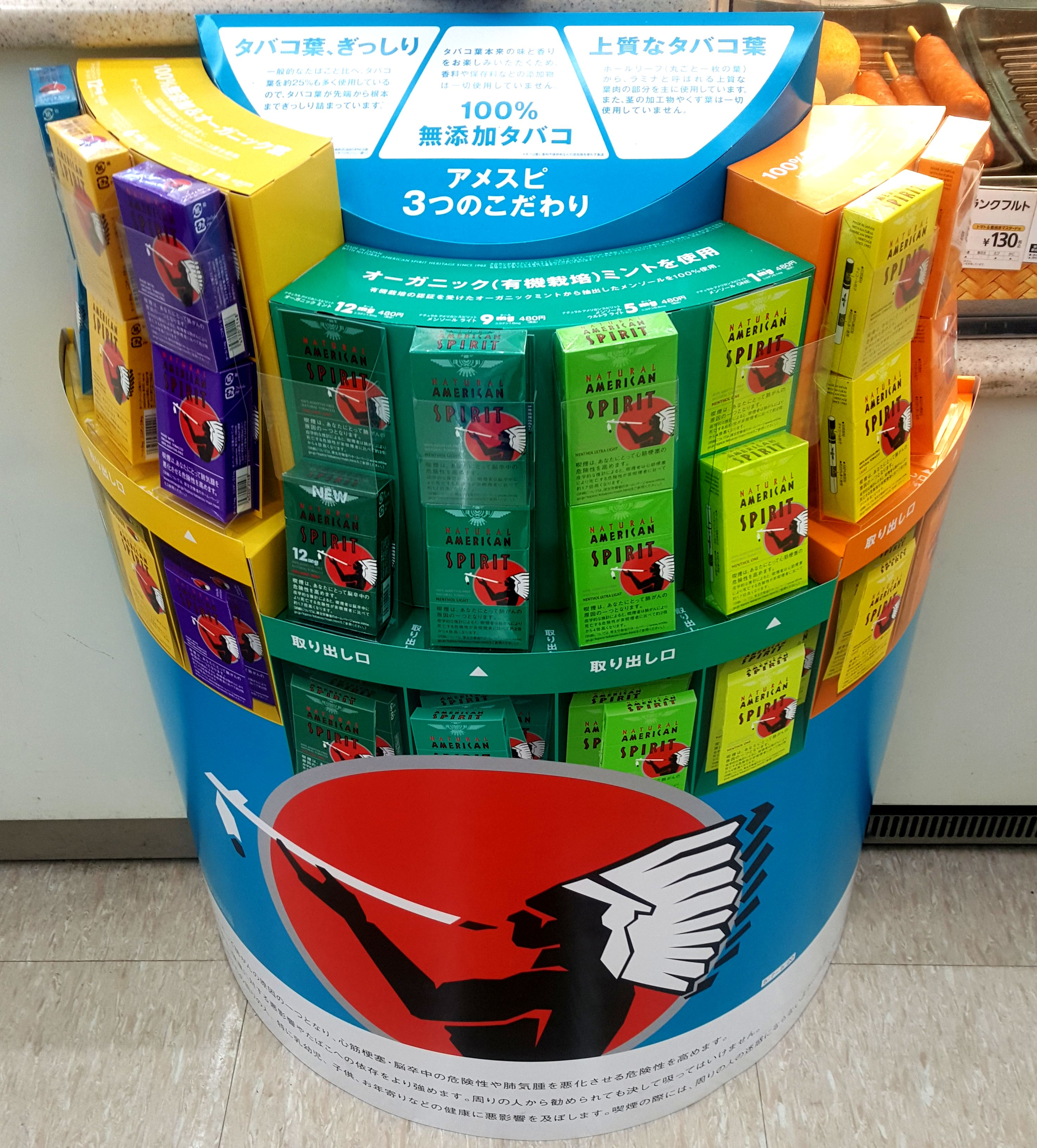
Natural American Spirit

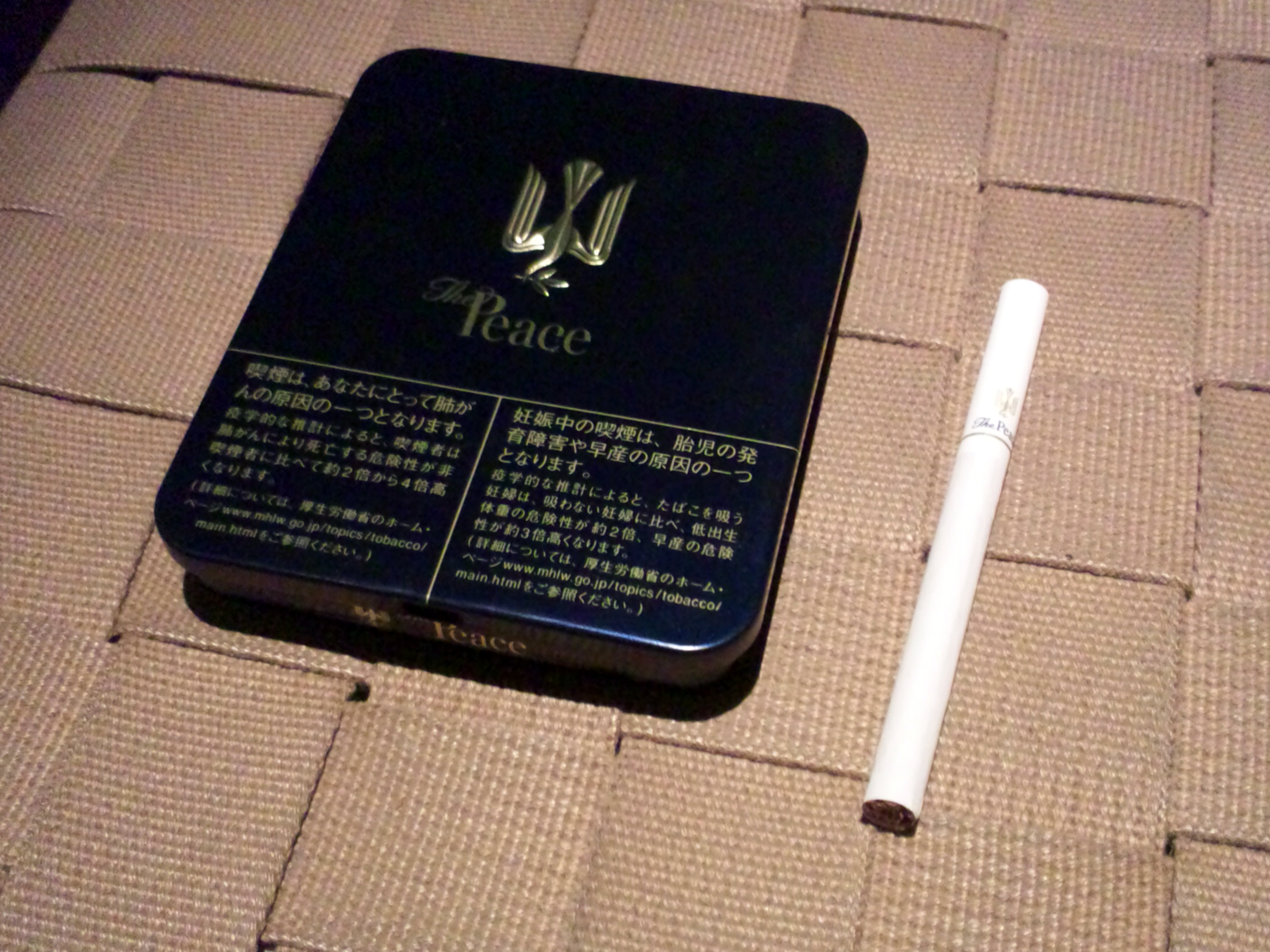
Peace

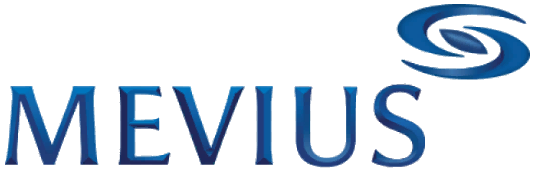
Mevius

=== Other brands ===
- Amadis
- Apache
- Amber Leaf
- Arsenal
- Aspen
- Belomorkanal
- Bringi
- Contessa
- Crescent & Star
- Death
- Doral
- Dorchester
- Export A
- Extreme Mild
- Frontier
- Fusion
- Genghis Khan
- Gold Coast
- Hi-Lite
- Islands
- Kool
- Kosmos
- LD
- Luch
- Lucky Strike
- Lviv
- MacDonald
- Magna
- Mercedes
- Mi-Ne
- Minna International
- Mighty
- Monte Carlo
- More
- Nasha Prima
- Navy
- Nevskie
- Nil
- Nordic Spirit
- North Star
- Now
- Old Holborn
- Overstolz
- Peter 1
- Premier
- Prima
- Russian Style
- Sheikh
- Silk Cut
- Slavia
- Sportsman
- Sterling
- St. Michel
- Sweet Menthol
- Vantage
- Wave
- Winchester
- Wings
- Winner
- YSL
- Zero Style Mint

== Smoking etiquette posters ==
JTI runs a series of posters designed to educate smokers about smoking etiquette. They can be seen widely around Japan, especially located near train stations.

== Environmental record ==
In 2008, Japan Tobacco had health issues involving their company: Contaminated gyoza dumplings made by a Chinese company's factory in China, which sold its products to JT, poisoned ten people, including a five-year-old girl. Thousands of other Japanese people were going to the hospital because of stomach issues as well. A number of dumplings were found containing dichlorvos and methamidophos from pesticide.

The health minister of Japan said the contamination at the Chinese factory was possibly intentional, and the police are investigating for an attempted homicide. The dumplings were from China, but Japan Tobacco has said it does not plan to cease its manufacturing in China. Frozen food sales went down by 60% for the business since this health scare. Japan Tobacco's stock price fell 7.1% after they were forced to recall their products, and the company also lost a $500 million merger deal with Nissin Foods because of this incident.

== Anti-illicit trade compliance ==
Japan Tobacco Inc, through its international operating divisions JT International S.A. and JT International Holding BV, signed a Cooperation Agreement with the European Commission in 2007 to combat the illicit trade in cigarettes under Article 9 of which the company agreed to "pro-actively disclose" to the European Commission's Anti-Fraud Office (Office Europeen de Lutte Antifraude – OLAF) "...all material information coming into (its) possession after the Execution Date relating to potentially Illegal Product." The Agreement defines "Illegal Product" as Contraband or Counterfeit Cigarettes. Both Japan Tobacco Inc and JT International S.A. claim to adhere to a "zero-tolerance approach" to illicit trade.

JT International S.A. and several of its distributors, including Megapolis in Russia and IBCS Trading in Cyprus, however, have been implicated as recently as 2011 in widespread smuggling to include selling cigarettes to a buyer in Syria subject to EU, Swiss, and US Sanctions and diverting cigarettes from Russia into the European Union and smuggling Winston and other popular cigarette brands into Iran.

A JT International S.A. executive told the Wall Street Journal in August 2012 that the firm had continued to ship cigarettes to Syria until as recently as February 2012, almost a full year after the imposition of EU and US sanctions. The Journal cited Syrian dissident sources who claimed that the government of Syrian President Bashar al-Assad uses cigarettes as payment for the irregular military forces and militias, known as the shabeeha, who have had a central role in its violent crackdown.

Company documents show that in 2010 the head of the JT International SA security office – who performed a similar function at the former Gallaher Group PLC – sought to destroy evidence linking up to 13 company officers to smugglers in the Balkans region; a parallel effort was then being run by company management to hack into the emails of company anti-smuggling investigators, competitors, and law enforcement.

The firm also announced in 2011 that it had purchased the largest cigarette producer in Sudan and South Sudan as part of an effort to expand sales in the war-torn region, which has emerged as an entrepot for cigarette smuggling.

== Sponsorships ==
- Galan Slim Loud & Vote Back To 80's
- Galan Slim Rock Your City
- Golf Nippon Series JT Cup (1998 – present)
- Mild Seven Tennis WTA Championships
- Mild Seven Outdoor Quest
- Mild Seven Millennium Countdown (31 December 1999 – 1 January 2000)
- Mild Seven (2012-2013 March) Benson & Hedges (2013 – present) a Pobol y Cwm Welsh Language Drama
- Wismilak Diplomat Success Challenge IDR 500.000.000 (2010, 2011, and 2012-2017 not together again Wismilak in Japan Tobacco since 2011-2016)
- Wismilak International Tennis WTA Championships
- Wismilak Slim Bolaria
- Apache Filter Rock And Dut (2013–present)
- Apache Exclusive Movement (2014–present)

== See also ==
- Tobacco industry
- Japan Tobacco International
- Osaka Marvelous
- Smoking in Japan
- Onshino Tabako
