= Hiroshi Kimura =

Hiroshi Kimura (木村宏, Kimura Hiroshi) is a former chairman of Japan Tobacco, a Nikkei 225 company.

In 1976, Kimura started working for the Japan Tobacco & Salt Public Corporation (current name 'Japan Tobacco'). He became the president for this company on June 23, 2006. Mitsuomi Koizumi became the president of this company in June 2012, and became chairman.

Preceded by Katsuhiko Honda	President of Japan Tobacco; June 23, 2006 - June 2012	Succeeded by Mitsuomi Koizumi
