= Mitsuomi Koizumi =

Japanese businessman

Mitsuomi Koizumi (小泉光臣, koizumi mitsuomi) is the incumbent president of Japan Tobacco, a Nikkei 225 company.

He replaced Hiroshi Kimura as president in June 2012.

== Early life and career ==
Koizumi was born in Hadano, Kanagawa on 15 April 1957 and graduated from Tokyo University of Economics.

Preceded by Hiroshi Kimura	President of Japan Tobacco; June 2012 – present	Succeeded by Incumbent
