= Wings (cigarette) =

American brand of cigarettes

- An old American pack of Wings cigarettes
- Product type: Cigarette
- Current owner: Japan Tobacco, British American Tobacco (European Union only)
- Produced by: Japan Tobacco, British American Tobacco (European Union only)
- Country: United States
- Introduced: 1929; 97 years ago
- Markets: See Markets
- Previous owners: Brown & Williamson
- Website: http://www.wingscigarettes.com/

Wings is an American brand of cigarettes, currently owned and manufactured by Japan Tobacco. As a subsidiary of giant British American Tobacco, Wings, along with some of B&W's other cigarette brands were sold in Europe.

== History ==
Wings was launched in 1929 by Brown & Williamson as a popular ten-cent economy brand. Wings cigarettes were a product of the Great Depression. While regular cigarettes cost 25¢ for two packs, Wings packs sold for 10¢ each. Later, the original dark brown label gave way to white in 1940 due to wartime ink restrictions. Around that time, the cigarette length was increased to king-size. It is one of JTI's United States brands.

It is available in Red, Gold, and Menthol in both Kings and 100s.

== Marketing ==
In the 1940s, Brown & Williamson issued the "Modern American Airplanes" series of trading cards. The cards were inserted in packs of their Wings cigarettes as a premium. There were four series of 50 subjects each. The back of each card contained descriptive text particular to each aircraft. It seems B&W initially planned to produce only one set of 50 cards. At some point in the process, they decided they had a good thing on their hands, and added another 100 subjects. They began with cards numbered 1 to 50, with only the card number in the box at the top of each card back. After the decision was made to increase the number subjects, they needed a way to distinguish this series from the ones to come. The caption "Series A" was added along with the number. The "Unlettered Series" and "Series A" were composed of exactly the same aircraft. Since the "Series A" cards were produced toward the end of the initial series production process, they are much harder to find, and command a premium over the cards in the other three series. Card number 34, is captioned Sparton "Executive" in the Unlettered Series, and corrected to Spartan "Executive" in Series A. "Series B" and "Series C" followed. Aircraft from foreign countries, notably Great Britain, were added to fill out these last two sets.

The first two series of cards were produced with the "cooperation of Popular Aviation magazine". The magazine, now named Flying, is still being published. The military planes pictured were from "official photographs" of the United States Navy or the United States Army Air Corps. Larger photos of the pictured aircraft were offered for 10 cents on the backs of the first 25 Series B cards. Albums for all three (different) series, to facilitate card collecting, were also available. The American Card Catalog number for these cards is T87. Back in 1940 Brown & Williamson sponsored a radio program called "Wings of Destiny". These cards were originally issued with their tobacco products in conjunction with the show. They were collected with albums, and usually were glued, or stapled to them, damaging the cards. The card collection series lasted until 1942.

Various advertising merchandise was also made to sponsor Wings cigarettes. Billboard and poster advertisements were made and were mainly in English, but in some cases also in other languages such as Dutch. A radio featuring the Wings advertisement logo's was also made.

== Markets ==
Wings are mainly sold in the United States, but also were or still are sold in the Netherlands, Germany and Russia.

== Sponsorship ==
Back in 1940, Brown & Williamson sponsored a radio program called "Wings of Destiny". Airplane trading cards were originally issued with their tobacco products in conjunction with the show.

== See also ==
- Cigarette
- Tobacco smoking
