= Peace (cigarette) =

Japanese cigarette brand

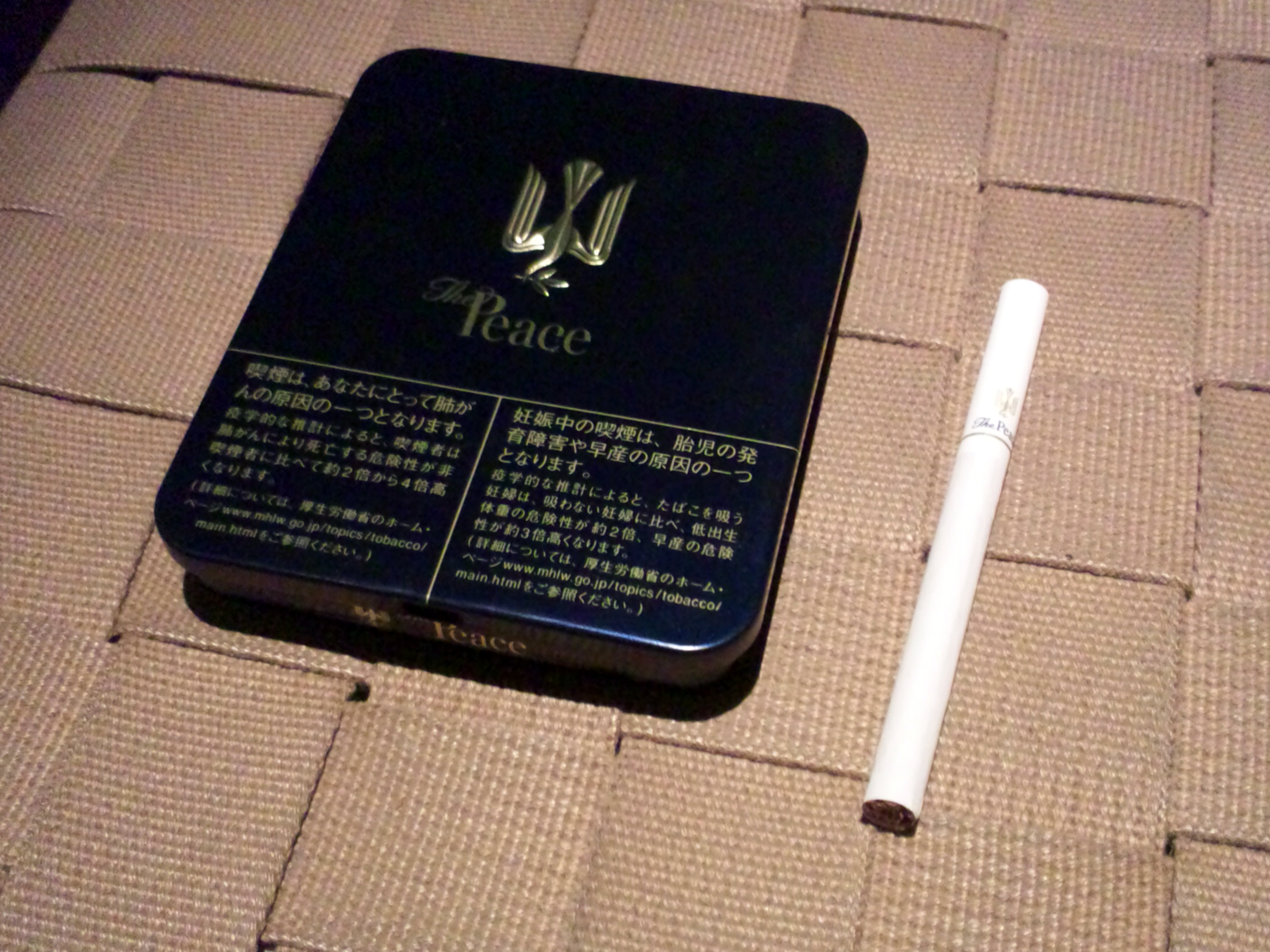
- An old Japanese tin box of Peace cigarettes along with a cigarette
- Product type: Cigarette
- Current owner: Japan Tobacco
- Produced by: Japan Tobacco
- Country: Japan
- Introduced: 1946; 80 years ago
- Markets: Japan, Taiwan

Peace is a Japanese brand of cigarettes, currently owned and manufactured by Japan Tobacco. The brand is produced exclusively in Japan.

== History ==
In January 1946, a 10-pack version of Peace cigarettes was released by the Japanese Ministry of Finance's Monopoly Authority. The name and design of the new issue were publicly offered as "New World," but "the Peace" was then adopted from the difficult manufacturing technology. The Peace brand was originally released as a memorial for peace in 1920, after the end of World War I, but sales eventually ceased. The current version, "Hope" has no affiliation with the pre-war variant. The current variant was released in hopes of a dream and with hope for a peaceful future in the confusing period after World War II.

The variant made by the Japan Monopoly Authority uses native Higashiyama leaves from the Japanese city of Ichinoseki of the Iwate Prefecture, which is different from the current Virginia blend.

Peace's logo was designed by Raymond Loewy, an U.S. industrial designer who also worked on the pack design of Lucky Strike, in April 1952. A high-priced design fee was a topic of discussion in the era when recognition was still low for commercial design, but as a result of the design change the annual sales number rapidly increased from 2.6 billion to 15 billion. The design changed preferences and the new design became the worldwide standard, as well as greatly influencing future Japanese product designs.

Inspired by Noah's Ark, as depicted in the Old Testament, a symbolic mark (a pigeon with olive leaves) is used on the Hope cigarettes. "A dove that Noah released from the window of the ark to know the state of the outer world where the flood happened. By bringing back leaves together, the great flood ceases and the Earth of relief is closed". Based on the anecdote, the pigeon became a symbol of peace and thus is used on the Peace cigarettes.

On May 28, 2016, the "Ninety-seventh Anniversary Limited Package" was sold in a limited quantity with nine issues, "Peace Classic" was sold in limited quantity as a celebration of the 70th anniversary.

Peace cigarettes come in short (70 mm), king size (85 mm), or long (100 mm). They come within a soft or hard pack or steel can, 10, 20, or 50 cigarettes per pack. It is the first full-fledged Virginia blend type with domestically produced leaves as a main ingredient of Virginia leaves, and the cigarettes have a deep flavour with a "faintly sweet and gentle fragrance" with a vanilla flavour. They are seen as a counterpart to Hope cigarettes.

== Products ==
- Peace 10 / Peace 50 Can (nonfilter, a.k.a. Short Peace)
- Peace Filter Cigarettes (Peace 20, a.k.a. Long Peace)
- Peace Medium
- Peace Lights (Japan) / Peace 10 (Taiwan)
- Peace Super Lights (Japan) / Peace 7 (Taiwan)
- Peace Infinity
- The Peace

Below are all the variants of Peace cigarettes, with the levels of tar and nicotine included.

Name	Release date	Date of discontinuance	Price in ¥	Tar	Nicotine	Description
Peace (10)	January 10, 1946	Still available	230 Yen	28 mg	2,3 mg	Short-cut / common name: Short Peace
Peace (50)	July 1, 1949	Still available	1,150 Yen	28 mg	2,3 mg	Cutout / common name: can-Peace, pecan. It is not sold in cigarette vending machines.
Peace (20)	February 1, 1965	Still available	460 Yen	21 mg	1,9 mg	Common name: long peace, longpea, gold
Peace Light	April 1, 1985	April 2001	260 Yen	10 mg	1,0 mg	Soft pack
Peace International	October 1, 1989	January 1994	??? Yen	12 mg	1,3 mg	
Peace Light box	October 1, 1991	Still available	460 Yen	10 mg	0,9 mg	
Peace Medium Box	August 1, 1994	May 2011	440 Yen	14 mg	1,2 mg	
Peace Super Light box	October 1, 1996	Still available	460 Yen	6 mg	0,5 mg	
Peace Acoustic	November 1, 2002	February 2008	320 Yen	8 mg	0,9 mg	No fragrance added
Peace Aroma Menthol Box	July 1, 2004	March 2007	320 Yen	7 mg	0,6 mg	Peace's first menthol
Peace Smooth Aroma box	July 1, 2005	February 2008	320 Yen	6 mg	0,5 mg	Charcoal filter
Peace Infinity	October 2, 2006	Still available	490 Yen	8 mg	0,7 mg	D-spec / 100's size / AFT charcoal filter
The Peace	February 1, 2012	Still available	1,000 Yen	10 mg	1,0 mg	It is sold at 3,500 tobacco face-to-face dealers throughout the country, and it is not sold at cigarette vending machines.
Peace Aroma Royal 100's Box	September 1, 2014	Still available	500 Yen	10 mg	1,0 mg	100's size
Peace Aroma Crown 100's Box	September 1, 2014	Still available	500 Yen	6 mg	0,6 mg	100's size
Peace Classic	June 1, 2016	Still available	1,500 Yen	10 mg	1,0 mg	Peace release 70th anniversary commemoration commodity. Limited sale only to 4,000 tobacco face-to-face shops nationwide. It is not sold in cigarette vending machines.

== See also ==
- Japan Tobacco
- Smoking in Japan
