= Overstolz =

German cigarette brand

- An old pack of Overstolz cigarettes
- Product type: Cigarette
- Produced by: Japan Tobacco International
- Country: German Empire
- Introduced: 1917; 109 years ago
- Discontinued: May 2015
- Markets: German Empire, Weimar Republic, Nazi Germany, Allied-occupied Germany, West-Germany, Germany
- Previous owners: Haus Neuerburg

Overstolz is a German cigarette brand manufactured by Japan Tobacco International.

== History ==
Overstolz was originally manufactured by the former Cologne cigarette company Haus Neuerburg. The brand is named after the Cologne patrician of Overstolzen and has been protected since 1917. In the 1960s, the German actor Heinz Engelmann (known from the police procedural television series Stahlnetz) was the advertising face of the cigarette brand, for which he made various newspaper and television adverts. In 2014, Overstolz cigarettes are manufactured by Japan Tobacco international in Trier. Since May 2015, the brand is no longer available on the normal market, however they are still available in online tobacco shops, but are only sold in 10-packs.

== Products ==
- Overstolz Filter

Below are all the current brands of Overstolz cigarettes sold, with the levels of tar, nicotine and carbon monoxide included.

Pack	Tar	Nicotine	Carbon monoxide
Overstolz Filter	10 mg	0,8 mg	10 mg

== In popular culture ==
In a nod to his Cologne background, Gereon Rath, the detective in Volker Kutscher's Berlin-based detective series smokes Overstolz.

== See also ==
- Tobacco smoking
