= Onshi no Tabako =

Special cigarettes given out by the Emperor of Japan

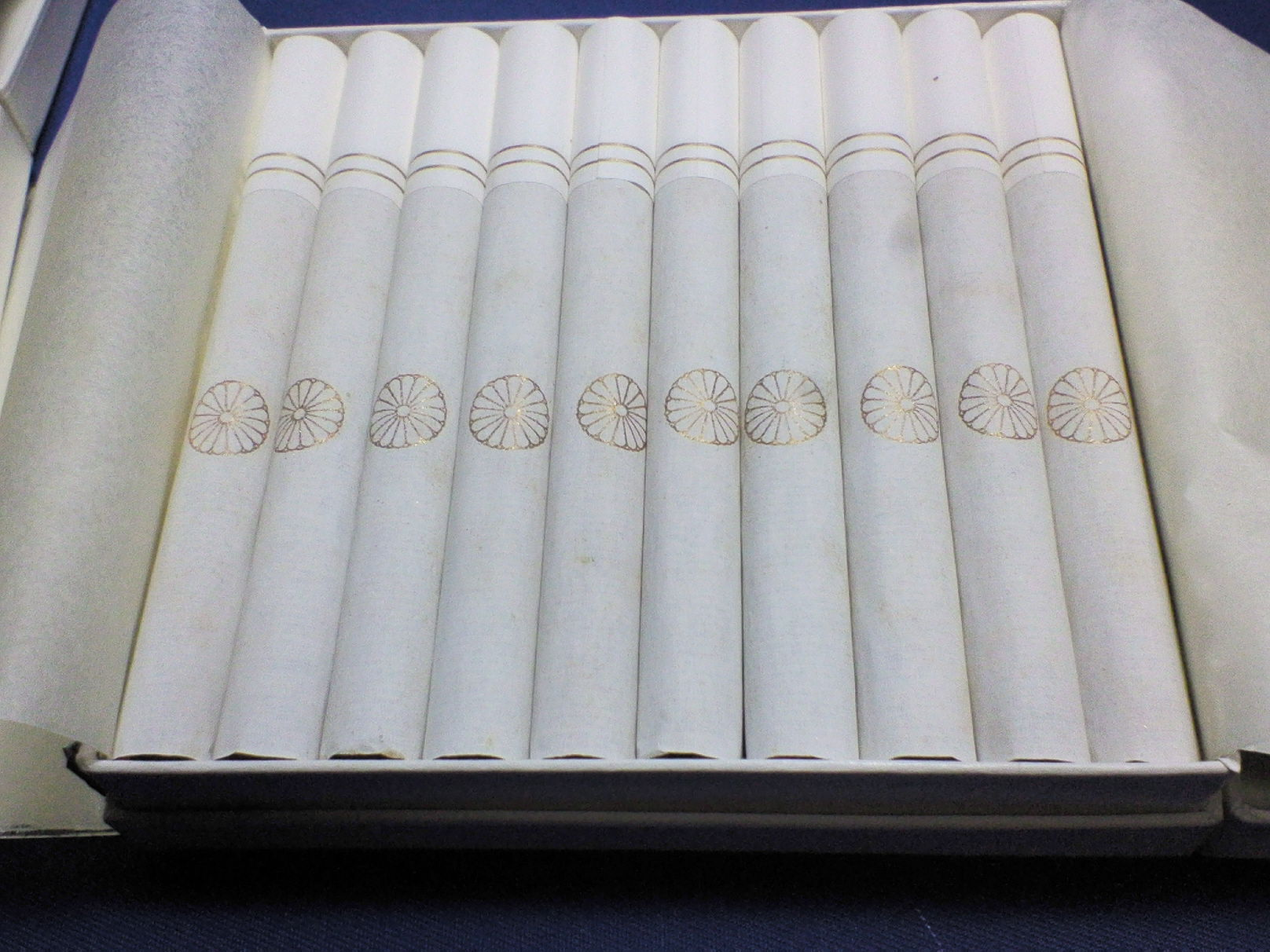
Onshi no tabako

Onshi no tabako (恩賜のたばこ) or Onshitabako (恩賜煙草), lit. "imperially bestowed tobacco", were cigarettes distributed by the Emperor of Japan as a mark of imperial favor. Bearing the imperial chrysanthemum crest, they were produced in two forms: zōyō (贈用), cigarettes bestowed as imperial gifts, and settaiyō (接待用), cigarettes distributed at imperial functions such as garden parties and banquets. Produced by the government tobacco monopoly and later by Japan Tobacco, onshi no tabako were presented to military personnel, recipients of decorations, participants in imperial ceremonies, and others associated with the Imperial Household until production ended in 2006. Matching boxes of matches bearing the chrysanthemum crest were also produced.

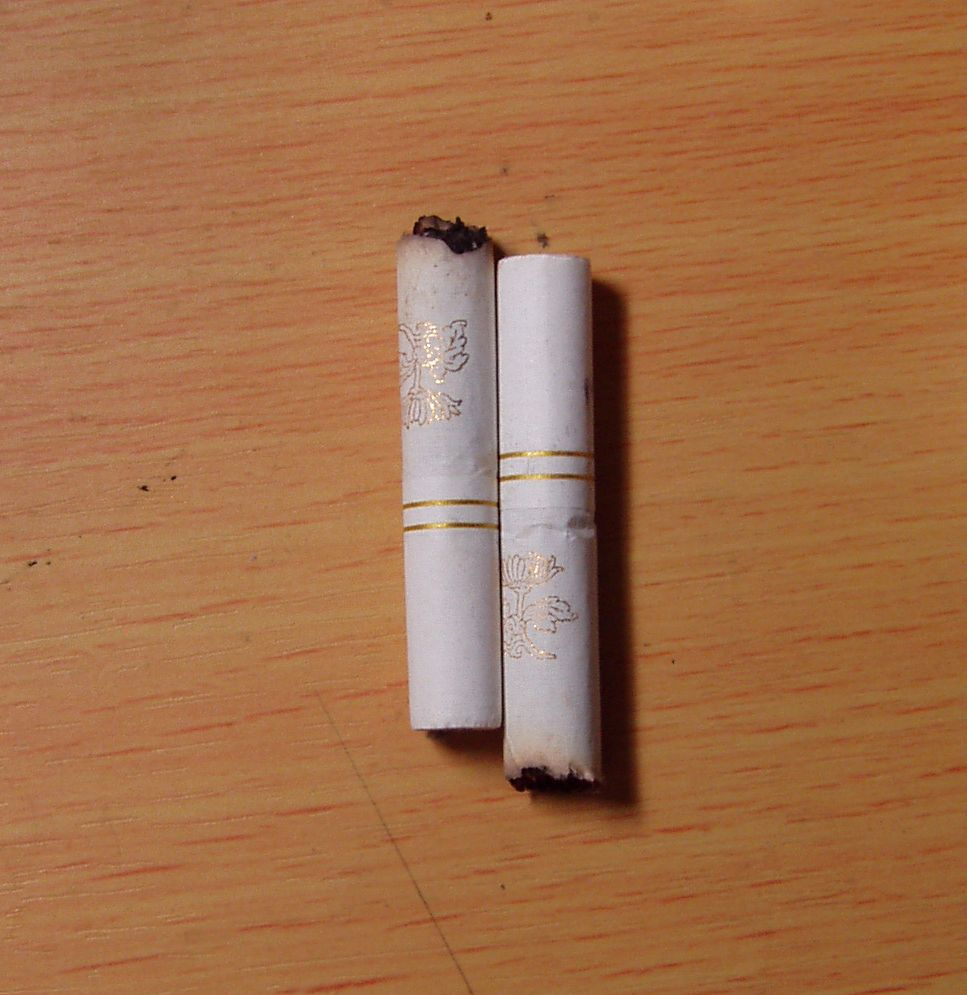
Compared to the above image these cigarette butts display the separate chrysanthemum markings.

The two categories of onshi no tabako could be distinguished by their markings. Cigarettes intended for imperial bestowal bore the formal sixteen-petal imperial chrysanthemum crest, while those distributed at receptions and other functions of the Imperial Household Agency used a stylized side-view chrysanthemum design incorporating leaves and stem (yokogiku or oreeda).

Onshi no tabako should be distinguished from goryō tabako (御料たばこ), tobacco produced for the emperor and empress, and tokusei tabako (特製たばこ), specially manufactured tobacco produced for members of the imperial family and for presentation by the Imperial Household.

In June 2005, the Imperial Household Agency announced that onshi no tabako would be discontinued by the end of fiscal year 2006. The cigarettes had traditionally been distributed as tokens of appreciation to individuals who assisted during imperial visits and other imperial activities, but were to be replaced by confectionery and other gifts in response to changing attitudes toward smoking.

== History ==
Cigarettes bearing the imperial chrysanthemum crest and known as onshi no tabako were distributed during the Meiji era (1868-1912), although the origins of the practice remain unclear. Empress Shōken, consort of Emperor Meiji, is known to have presented gifts of onshi no Tabako to soldiers wounded during the 1877 Satsuma Rebellion.

During subsequent wars, onshi no tabako were frequently bestowed upon military personnel as rewards and tokens of imperial favor. The cigarettes were often distributed to Japanese soldiers at the front as imperial rewards (onshō) and expressions of appreciation from the emperor.

During the Sino-Japanese War (1894-1895) cigarettes were produced for the military by the Iwaya Shokai Company. These would later become known as "onshi no tobako." In 1904, production was transferred to the government tobacco monopoly. By 1933 the distribution of specially prepared imperial gift cigarettes had been formalized. Separate tobacco products were manufactured for the emperor and empress, for members of the imperial family, and for use as imperial gifts. Emperor Taishō was a smoker and used cigarettes produced specifically for him, whereas Emperor Shōwa did not smoke. Nevertheless, production of tobacco for the Imperial Household continued throughout the Shōwa period.

On 25 June 1959, onshi no tabako were presented to members of the Tokyo Giants and Osaka Tigers following a game attended by Emperor Shōwa. According to records of the National Diet of Japan, the cigarettes were comparable in quality to the commercial brand Asahi. Another type of tobacco, bearing a 14-petal chrysanthemum crest rather than the standard 16-petal imperial crest, was produced for guests of the Imperial Household Agency and members of the imperial family.

== Terminology of Imperial Household-related tobacco ==
- Goryō tabako (御料たばこ): tobacco produced for the emperor, empress, and empress dowager. Production began in 1873 under contract with Sotoike Shōzaburō's Yanagiya shop and was transferred to the Tobacco Monopoly Bureau in 1904. The tobacco was manufactured from specially selected and carefully aged leaves and produced under strict supervision.

The quality of this tobacco was comparable to that of leading commercial cigarette brands of the period such as Fuji, Asahi, and Shikishima. From 1914, the chrysanthemum crest was printed at the center of each cigarette in order to avoid the possibility that the imperial emblem would be stepped on after the cigarette had been discarded.

- The Tokusei Tabako (特製たばこ) Specially manufactured tobacco: There were two categories of specially manufactured tobacco: one produced for the Crown Prince's Household, the Empress's Household, and the various princely houses of the imperial family, and another produced for presentation as gifts by the Imperial Household Agency. Specially manufactured cigarettes were produced for members of the various princely houses of the imperial family, including the Arisugawa-no-miya, Kitashirakawa-no-miya, Kaya-no-miya, and Prince Kuni Kuniyoshi houses. The production of special tobacco for members of the imperial family was discontinued in 1945 following reforms implemented during the Allied Occupation.

== Packaging ==
When first produced, the characters "Onshi / 恩賜" were printed in gold on the package, and it was formally called Special Product No. 1.

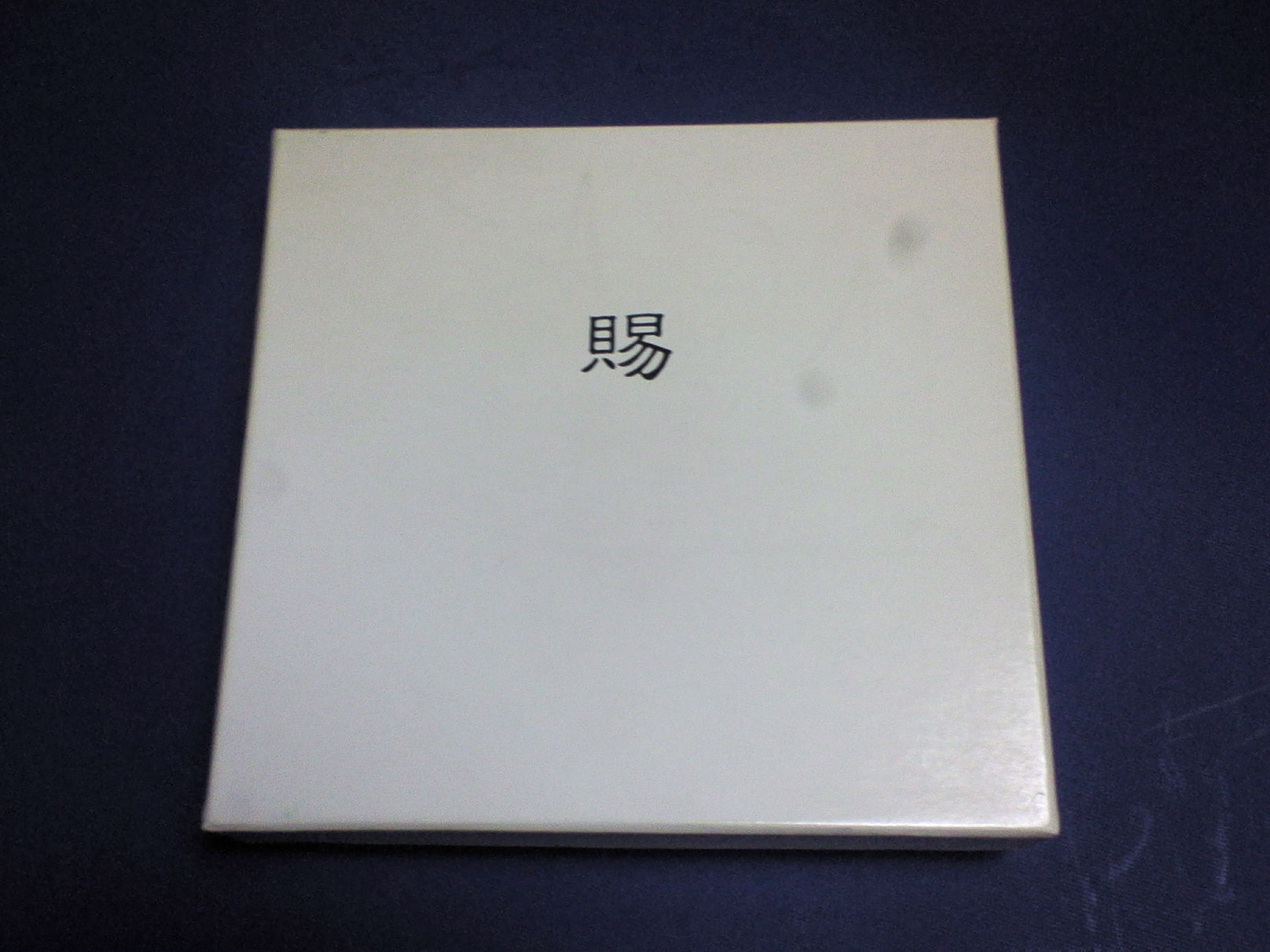
Imperial tobacco box of the latter period

When wartime shortages intensified, the gold lettering was replaced with black lettering, and the design was eventually simplified to a single character, 賜 ("bestowed"). The postwar packaging retained this design.

The production of special tobacco for members of the imperial family was discontinued in 1945. However, a separate product known as "Special Tobacco No. 3" was introduced in 1968 for use by members of the Imperial Household. The relationship between these products is unclear in the available sources.

== Production ==
Onshi no tabako were manufactured at tobacco factories in the Tokyo area under strict supervision. Before 1945 access to production facilities was tightly restricted and workers assigned to their manufacture underwent special screening. Even after mechanized cigarette production became standard, onshi no tabako continued to be produced largely by hand by a small group of experienced workers.

Production reached between one and two million cigarettes annually during the Pacific War. Output declined sharply after 1945, falling to fewer than 100,000 cigarettes per year between 1945 and 1965. Filter cigarettes were introduced in 1968, and annual production subsequently rose to approximately 300,000 cigarettes.

In addition to cigarettes, cigars bearing the imperial chrysanthemum crest were also produced. Made from Sumatra and Havana tobacco, they were typically packaged in boxes of 25. Cigars were produced for imperial use as early as 1917 during the reign of Emperor Taishō, while the production of cigars for presentation purposes began in 1939. Between 1945 and 1982, annual production averaged approximately 2,500 cigars, reaching a peak of 4,000 in 1945.

== Sources ==
- Japan Monopoly Corporation. Tabako Senbaishi (たばこ専売史). Vol. 1. Tokyo: Japan Monopoly Corporation, 1964. (in Japanese)
- Nihon Senbai Kōsha Tōkyō Kōjō, Kōjōshi Henshū Iinkai, ed. Tabako to tomo ni shichijūyo-nen (たばこと共に七十余年). Tokyo: Nihon Senbai Kōsha Tōkyō Kōjō, 1982. (in Japanese)
- Tobacco Research Center. Tabako Jiten (たばこ事典). Tokyo: San'ai Shoin, 2009. (in Japanese)
