= Smoking in Japan =

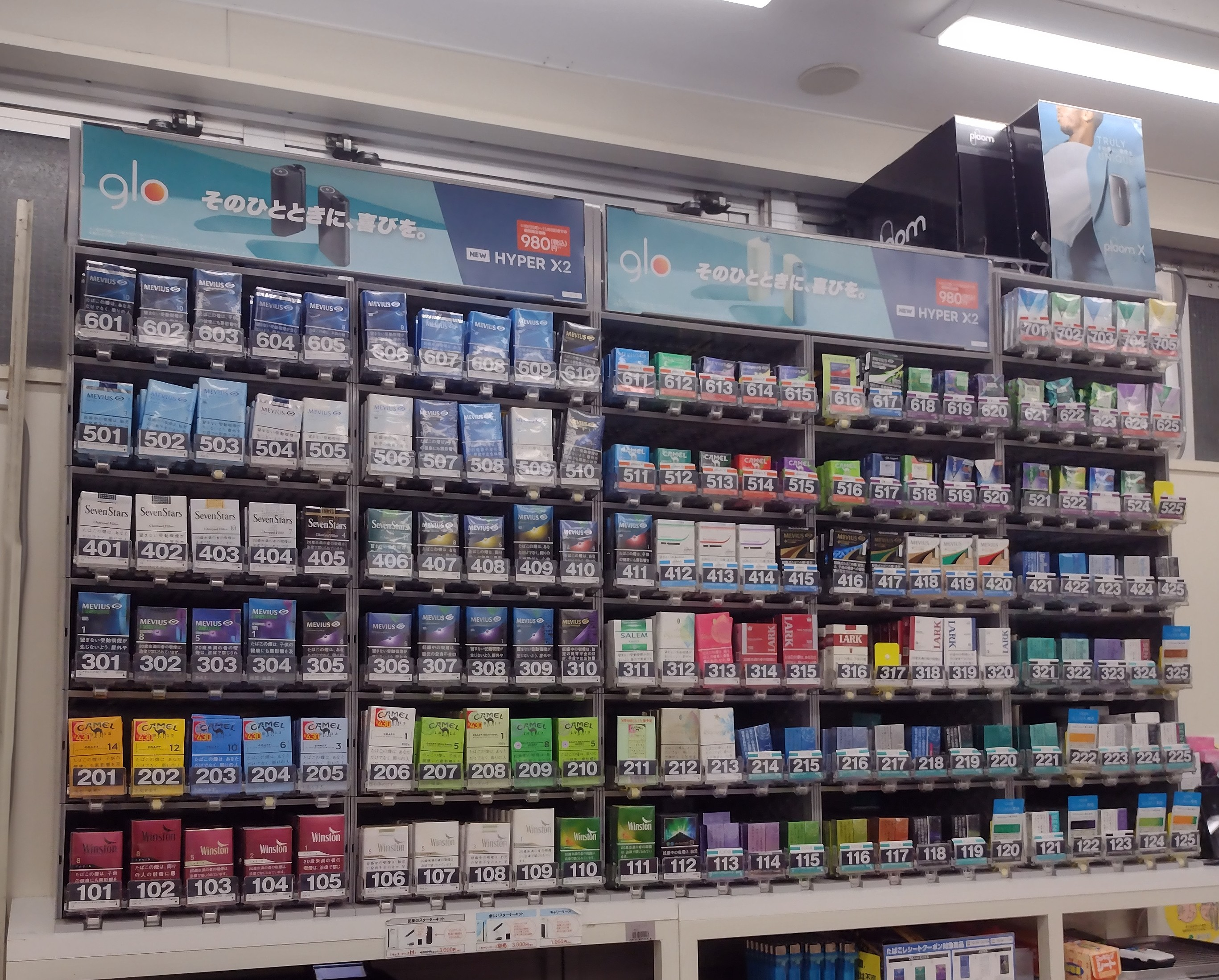
Tobacco on display in a store in Tokyo

Around 20,000,000 people in Japan smoke, and the nation is one of the world's largest tobacco markets, though tobacco use has been declining in recent years.

As of 2022, the Japanese adult smoking rate was 14.8%. By gender, 24.8% of men and 6.2% of women consumed a tobacco product at least once a month. This is the lowest recorded figure since the Ministry of Health, Labour and Welfare or Japan Tobacco began surveying in 1965.

Per capita consumption in 2016 was 1,583 cigarettes, roughly 45% of the peak consumption of 3,497 in 1977.

== History ==
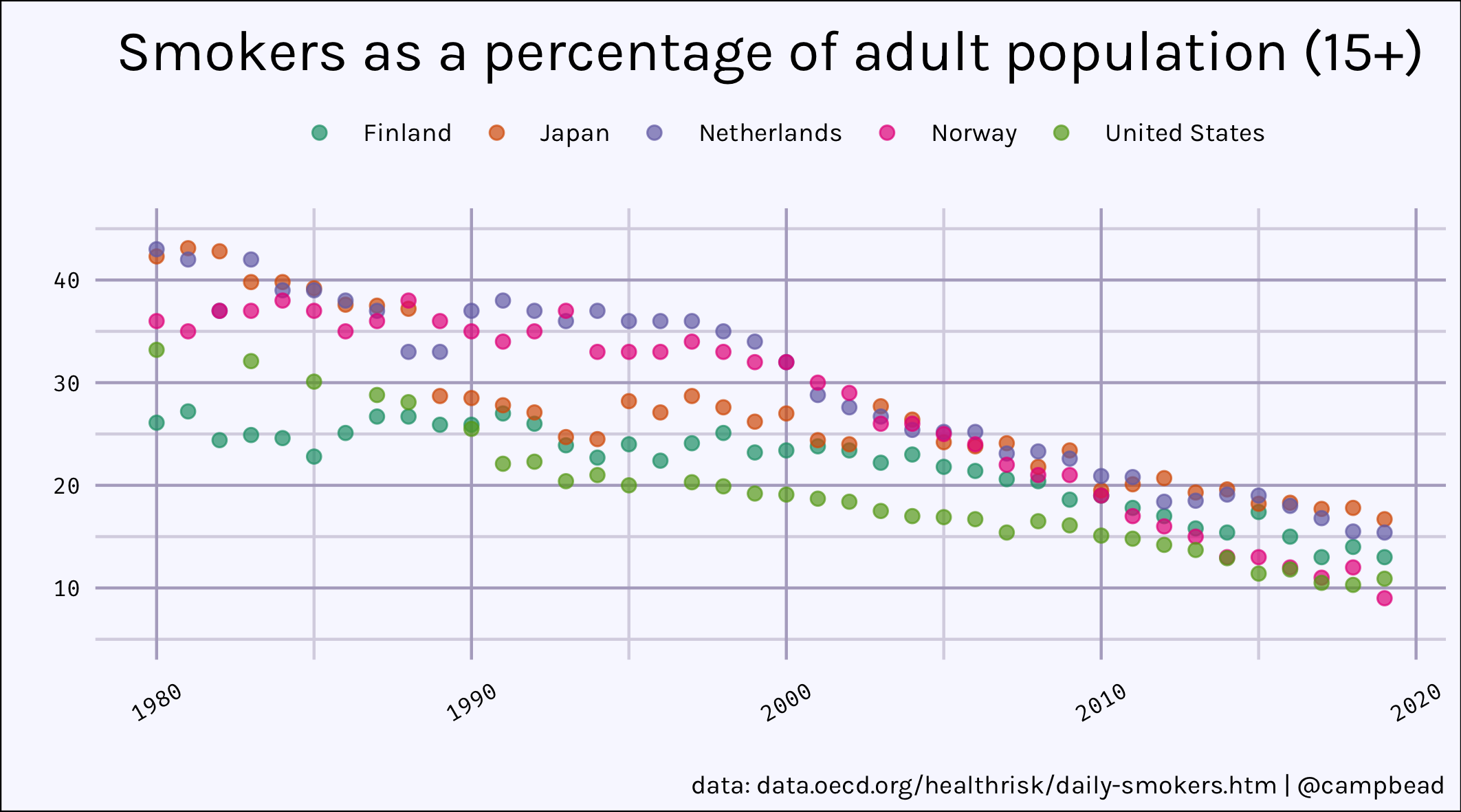
Smokers as a percentage of the population for Japan as compared with the United States, the Netherlands, Norway, and Finland. 1980–2019

Until 1985, the tobacco industry was a government-run monopoly; the government of Japan is still involved in the industry through the Ministry of Finance, which after a sell-off in March 2013, owns one-third of Japan Tobacco's outstanding stock, and the Ministry of Health, Labour and Welfare, which is active in public health and other tobacco control policymaking.

The Ministry of Finance as well as many MPs of the Diet of Japan have interests in the tobacco industry and thus tobacco control legislation is lenient, according to the anti-smoking lobby.

== Smoking age ==
The smoking age in Japan has been 20 since 1876.

== Pricing ==
The price of a particular brand of cigarettes in Japan is set by manufacturers and approved by the Ministry of Finance. A particular brand of cigarettes costs the same across all vendors. As of August 2020, the price of a typical pack of cigarettes ranges from ¥400 to ¥530. A proposed tobacco tax hike in October 2020 will increase the price range to ¥450 to ¥570 for typical brands.

== Heated tobacco products ==
Heated tobacco products became established in Japan after IQOS was introduced in Nagoya in 2014 and expanded nationally in 2015, followed by other heated tobacco brands from British American Tobacco in 2016 and Japan Tobacco in 2017.

Japan's regulatory model permits the sale and promotion of heated tobacco products while nicotine-containing electronic cigarettes are not legally sold domestically, contributing to a tobacco-product market that differs from those of many other countries.

A Tobacco Control study using sales data through 2023 reported that per-capita and total cigarette sales in Japan declined by 52.6% and 52.7%, respectively, between 2011 and 2023.

A scoping review of studies published in English through December 31, 2024, concluded that HTP use likely contributed to declines in cigarette use in Japan from 2015 to 2018, while finding that evidence after 2018 remained incomplete and did not support definitive causal conclusions.

The same review said that claims about HTPs acting as a gateway to cigarette smoking in Japan were unclear because available evidence indicated that HTPs were mainly used by current or former smokers, with minimal uptake among people who had never smoked.

A 2025 BMJ Open study of a 2019 door-to-door survey of people aged 18-24 found weighted current-use prevalence of 10.1% for cigarettes, 5.1% for HTPs and 1.8% for e-cigarettes, with 68.2% of current HTP users also using cigarettes.

== Smoking bans ==
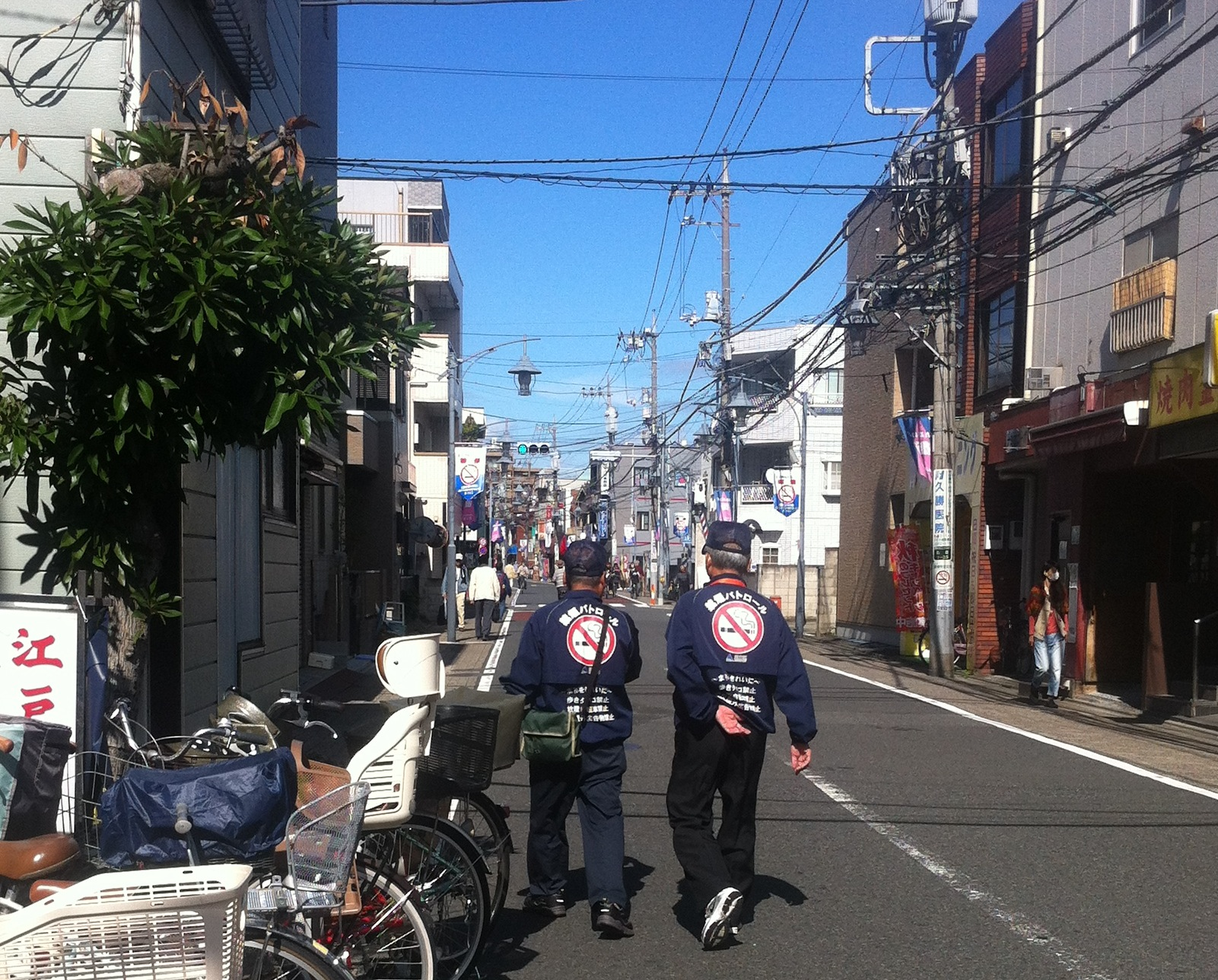
A no-smoking patrol in Adachi, Tokyo, in 2014

Unlike many other countries, Japan traditionally had outdoor smoking regulations and more lenient policies for indoor smoking. Outdoor smoking is frowned upon on public streets, and local governments typically have bylaws banning it on busy public streets.

Except for fire codes, indoor smoking for private businesses was unregulated until 2019. The general consensus was that local governments had jurisdiction over smoking in public outdoor spaces but not within private properties, including commercial spaces.

In June 2018, the Tokyo Metropolitan Assembly approved indoor-smoking regulations targeting commercial spaces in Tokyo in order to reduce passive smoking prior to hosting the 2019 Rugby World Cup, the 2020 Summer Olympics, and the 2020 Summer Paralympics.

In July 2018, the National Diet passed an amendment that banned smoking in public facilities for the first time in the nation's history. The ban was rolled out in stages and has been fully enforced since April 2020. It makes smoking illegal in public institutions (schools, hospitals, municipal offices, etc.), except in special smoking spaces. Restaurants and bars have a ban on indoor smoking except in well-ventilated rooms, where drinking or eating is not allowed. However, small pubs like izakaya are exempted. Establishments with a ¥50 million capitalization or lower and up to 100 m^{2} floor space can allow smoking if they put up a warning sign.

A Tobacco Control analysis described the 2020 Health Promotion Act as restricting both cigarette smoking and HTP use in indoor public places, while exempting some small establishments and permitting cigarette-smoking and HTP-designated rooms.

=== Indoor smoking ban ===
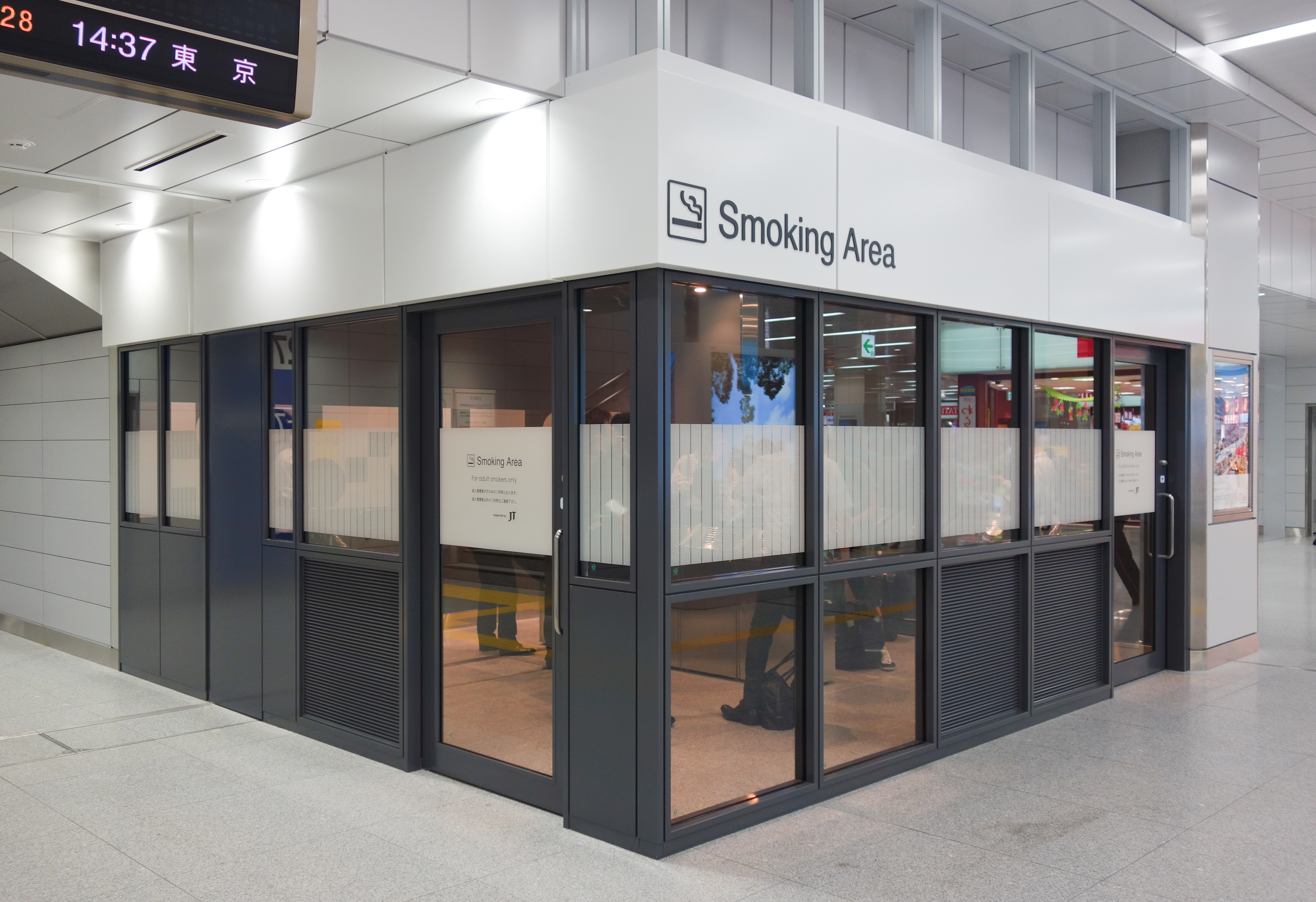
Indoor smoking room at Shin-Ōsaka Station

Mandatory indoor smoking bans apply to schools, childcare, hospitals, clinics and government administrative buildings throughout Japan. More lenient smoking restrictions apply to other buildings such as workplaces, food establishments and judicial buildings, where indoor smoking is not allowed but a designated smoking room may be constructed, provided access by minors is restricted and no food or drink is served inside. The indoor smoking ban does not apply to smoking clubs or grandfathered food establishments smaller than 100m^{2}, provided no minors are allowed to enter the premises.

Local governments in Japan have the power to enact stricter smoking bylaws. Some prefectures such as Tokyo, Kanagawa and Hyogo have stricter indoor smoking bylaws, although designated indoor smoking areas are typically allowed.

=== Outdoor smoking ban ===
Many of the wealthier wards of Tokyo, such as Shinjuku and Shibuya, are applying various kinds of outdoor anti-smoking bylaws. They have designated special outdoor smoking sections in areas and it is punishable by fine if caught smoking outside these areas. Chiyoda-ku banned smoking while walking on busy streets from November 2002, the first local government in Japan to do so.

Starting in 2007, Kyoto began designating certain city streets as non-smoking areas, and have since then been increasing the number of streets designated as such. In a 2010 report, Kyoto Prefecture stated that the major goal of their anti-smoking policies is "to ensure that there is zero chance for people to suffer from second-hand smoke in Kyoto prefecture."

== Women and smoking ==
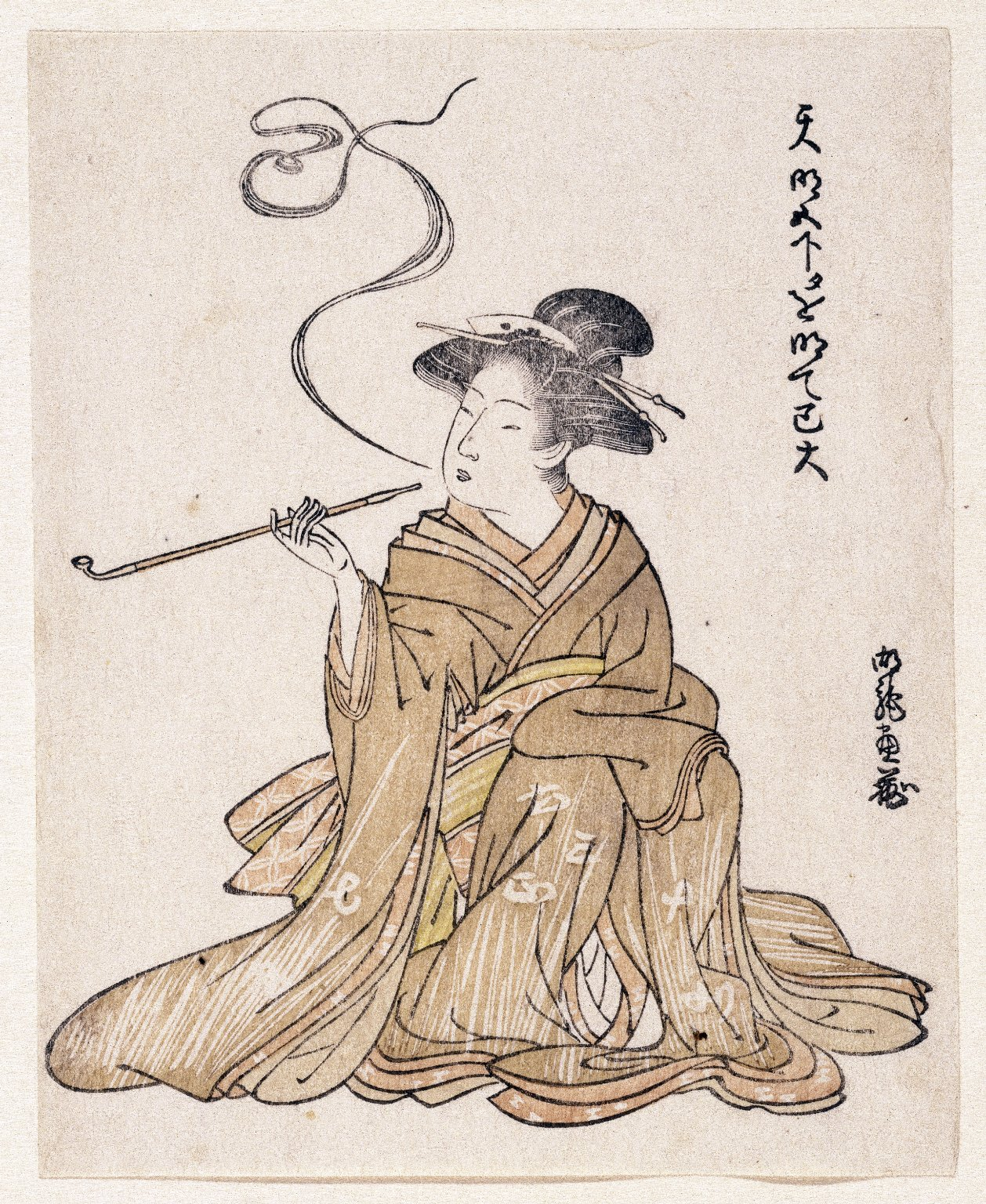
E-Goyomi (Lady Smoking)
Woodblock print believed to be by Korinsai, dating between 1785 and 1790. She is smoking with a long kiseru.

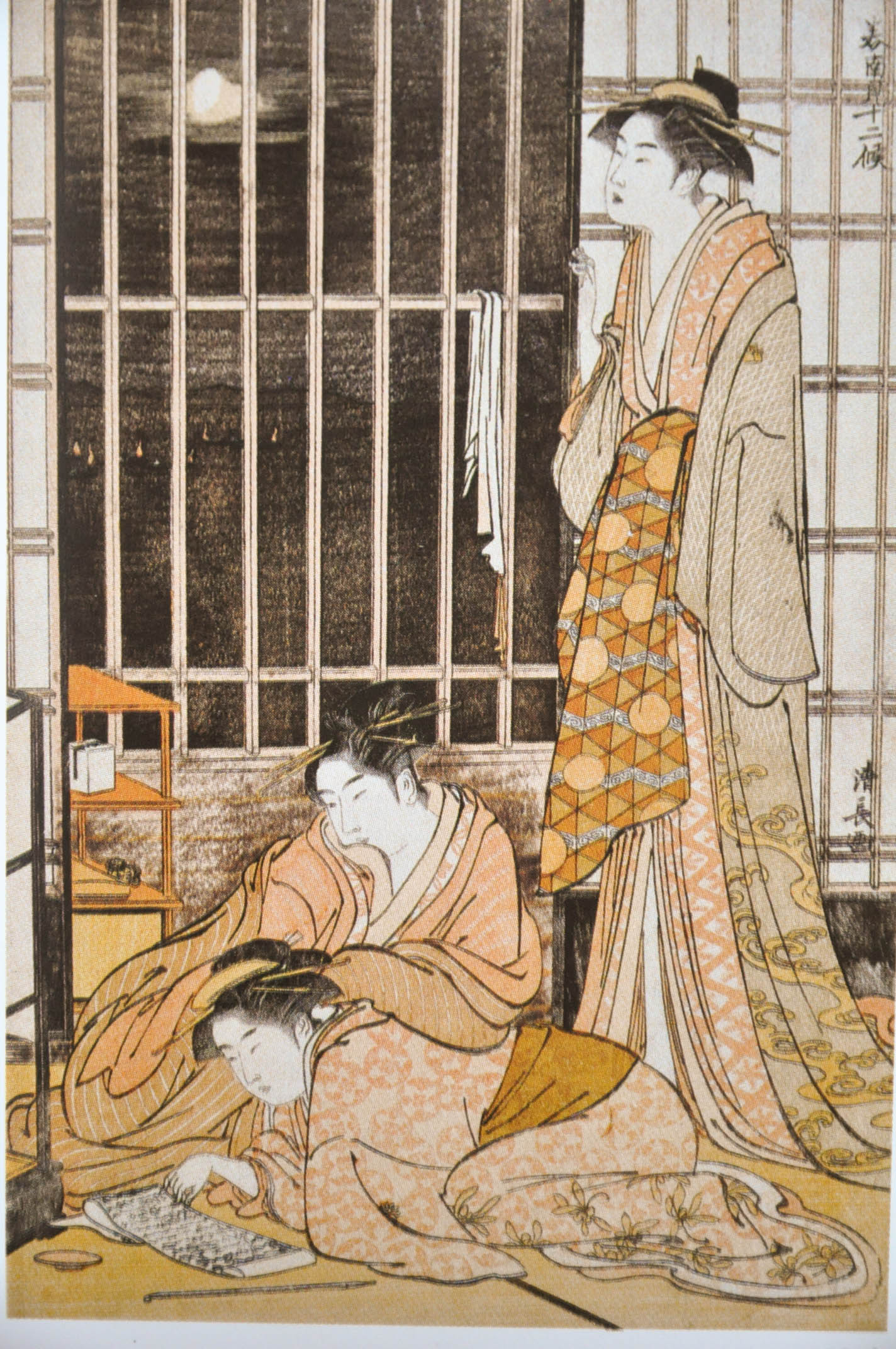
Ninth month of the series Minami jūni kō
Woodcut print by Torii Kiyonaga, around 1784. A long kiseru beside one of three prostitutes who is reading a paper in a brothel at Shinagawa, Tokyo.

The major female smokers were prostitutes (yūjo) by early 19th century.

While a high percentage of men in Japan have smoked throughout the postwar years, the rate for women for many years hovered between 10 and 15%, followed by a decline in recent years to currently just below 10%.

The government's advertising ban based on the "motherhood" argument was watertight until the tobacco industry was privatized in 1985. Advertising that encourages women to smoke is forbidden in Japan under a voluntary industry agreement. The industry group pledged to voluntarily honor the advertising ban and is charged with enforcing it.

In the mid-1990s, the number of younger female smokers in particular had risen substantially. Smoking has since declined among this group as well, but that cohort of women still smokes at a higher rate than their elders. "The manufacturers were very successful in providing cool images to the consumers," said Ministry of Health and Welfare technical officer Yumiko Mochizuki in 1998, when asked to explain the steady rise in female smokers. "Until recently, the Ministry of Health and Welfare had an understanding that smoking was entirely up to the individual."

Shoko Miyata was chosen for the 2024 Olympics, but was forced to leave the Japanese women's artistic gymnastics Olympic team she was captain of due to being caught smoking, which was against the team's conduct code.

United States maker Brown & Williamson sells Capri cigarettes in Japan in slim white boxes with a flower-like design on the cover. R.J. Reynolds' Tokyo billboards for Salem's Pianissimo cigarettes are green-and-pink. Philip Morris advertised its Virginia Slims brand with the slogan "Be You" in an ad campaign.

Other factors contribute to the rise in female smokers. Some observers cite stress, saying that more Japanese women are smoking to relax as more enter the workforce. Media influence is also cited, as many women on popular Japanese television dramas smoke.

== Cigarette vending machines ==
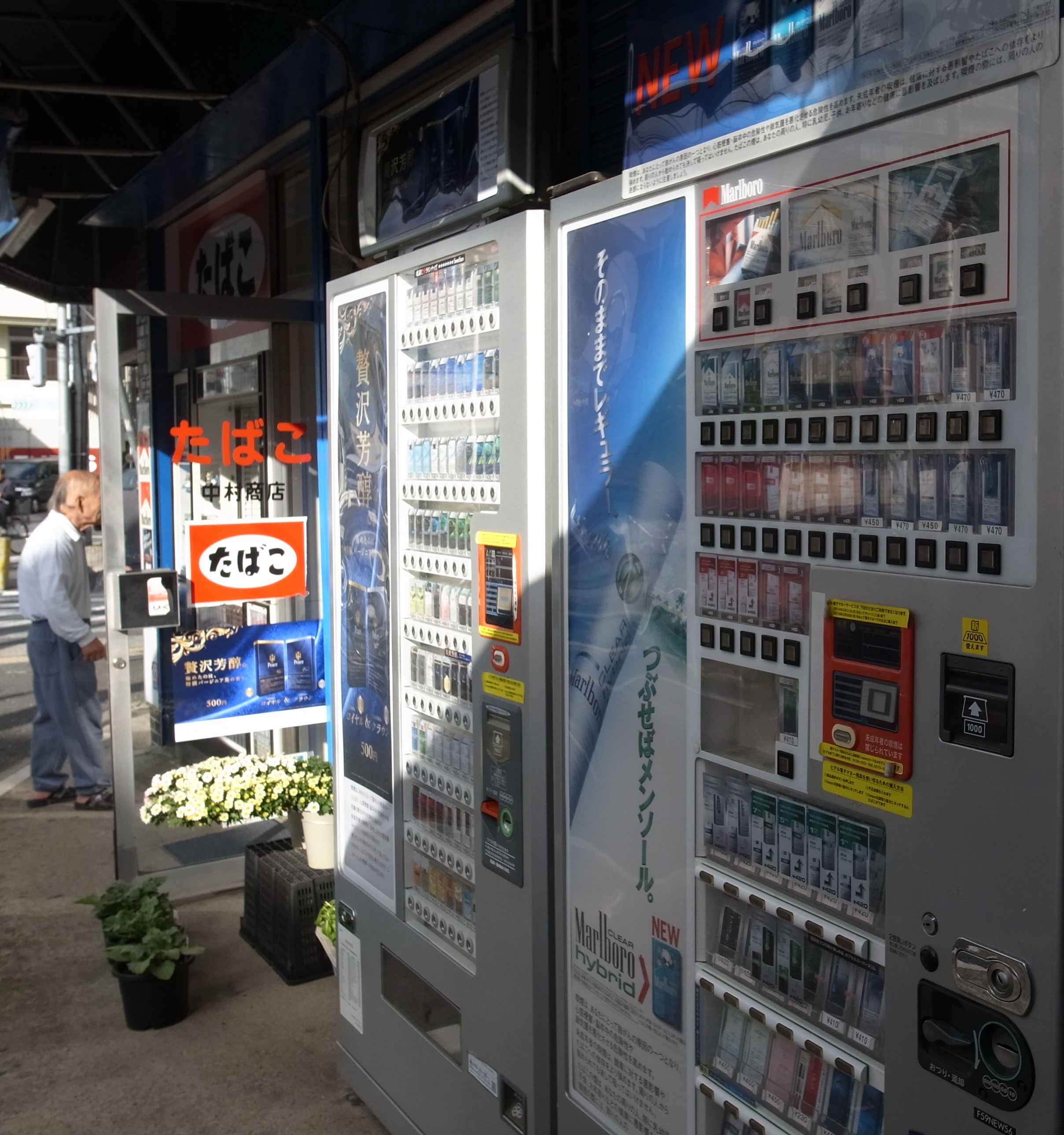
Cigarette vending machines in 2014

Cigarettes can be bought in tobacco stores and at vending machines, and public ashtrays dot sidewalks and train platforms. The number of cigarette vending machines in Japan was estimated at 500,000 in 2002.

The law prohibits the smoking of cigarettes by persons under the age of twenty.

Taspo is a smart card developed by the Tobacco Institute of Japan, the nationwide association of tobacco retailers, and the Japan Vending Machine Manufacturers Association. Introduced in 2008, the card is necessary to purchase cigarettes from vending machines.

In 2008 Japan Tobacco commissioned a series of over 70 public service announcement style "smoking manner" posters about smoking etiquette. The ads were displayed in a wide variety of formats ranging from placards in the subway to postcards to beverage coasters.

== See also ==
- Onshino Tabako
