= List of Sekirei chapters =

The cover of the first volume of Sekirei as published by Square Enix on June 25, 2005, in Japan.

The manga Sekirei is a seinen series created by Sakurako Gokurakuin. The manga has been collected into nineteen tankōbon volumes in Japan. Yen Press licensed the series in North America and released the volumes digitally from November 24, 2015, to November 27, 2018. The publisher later released the volumes in ten 2-in-1 omnibus volumes from July 18, 2017, to November 12, 2019.

== Volume list ==
No.	Original release date	Original ISBN	English release date	English ISBN
1	June 25, 2005	978-4-7575-1457-7	November 24, 2015 (digital); July 25, 2017 (print)	978-0-316-26822-6 (digital); 978-0-316-44101-8 (print)
i. "Sekirei" (セキレイ); ii. "Wings of Light" (光ノ羽, "Hikari no Hane"); iii. "Blooming Town" (萌ス帝都, "Mozasu Machi"); 001. "Maiden of the Moonlit Sky" (月空の乙女, "Gekkū no Otome"); 002. "Gate of a New Home" (新屋ノ扉, "Shin Oku no Tobira"); 003. "Musubi" (結); 004. "Girl of Green" (緑ノ少女, "Midori no Shōjo"); 005. "Inside of The Dream" (夢ノ中, "Yume no Naka")
2	October 25, 2005	978-4-7575-1553-6	January 26, 2016 (digital); July 25, 2017 (print)	978-0-316-27052-6 (digital); 978-0-316-44101-8 (print)
006. "The Second Man" (二番目ノ男, "Nibanme no Otoko"); 007. "A Calling Voice" (ヨビゴエ, "Yobigoe"); 008. "A Chance Meeting" (邂逅, "Kaikō"); 009. "Conclusion" (決着, "Ketchaku"); 010. "Winging" (羽化, "Uka"); 011. "Sekirei Talks" (鶺鴒閑話, "Sekirei Kanwa"); 012. "By My Side" (僕ノ傍ニ, "Boku no Soba ni"); 013. "Yukari Invades" (妹, 襲来, "Yukari, Shūrai"); 014. "All Sorts of Situations" (其其ノ事情, "Sorezore no Jijō"); 015. "The Colorful Tale of Izumo Inn" (出雲荘奇談, "Izumo-sō Kidan"); 016. "Angel In a White Coat" (博衣ノ鶺鴒, "Hakui no Tenshi")
3	May 25, 2006	978-4-7575-1684-7	March 29, 2016 (digital); October 31, 2017 (print)	978-0-316-27054-0 (digital); 978-0-316-44102-5 (print)
017. "Sekirei of Black" (黒ノ鶺鴒, "Kuro no Sekirei"); 018. "Sky of Beginnings" (始マリノ空, "Hajimari no Sora"); 019. "Promise" (約束, "Yakusoku"); 020. "Sekirei of Water" (水ノ鶺鴒, "Mizu no Sekirei"); 021. "Magnificent Tsukiumi" (月海絢爛, "Tsukiumi Kenran"); 022. "Sekirei of Mine" (オレノセキレイ, "Ore no Sekirei"); 023. "Congratulations, Sekirei" (鶺鴒, 寿グ, "Sekirei, Kotohogu"); 024. "Izumo Inn's War of Flowers" (出雲荘花軍, "Izumo-sō Hana Ikusa"); 025. EXTRA - "The Case of Little Sister Sahashi 1" (佐橋妹ノ場合1, "Sahashi Yukari no Baai Ichi"); 026. EXTRA - "The Case of Little Sister Sahashi 2" (佐橋妹ノ場合2, "Sahashi Yukari no Baai Ni"); 027. EXTRA - "The Case of Little Sister Sahashi 3" (佐橋妹ノ場合3, "Sahashi Yukari no Baai San")
4	January 25, 2007	978-4-7575-1933-6	May 31, 2016 (digital); October 31, 2017 (print)	978-0-316-27057-1 (digital); 978-0-316-44102-5 (print)
028. "Sekirei Dance" (鶺鴒舞踊, "Sekirei Buyō"); 029. "Shadow Of Darkness" (闇ノ影, "Yami no Kage"); 030. "What I Can Do For Your Sake" (君ノ為ニデキルコト, "Kimi no Tame ni Dekiru Koto"); 031. "Sekirei No. 95" (鶺鴒番號九拾五番, "Sekirei Bangō Kyū-jū-go-ban"); 032. "Sekirei Of Wind" (風ノ鶺鴒, "Kaze no Sekirei"); 033. "A Reason Not to Fight" (不戦ノ理由, "Tatakawazu no Riyū"); 034. "Sealed Teito" (閉ジタ帝都, "Tojita Teito"); 035. "Veil And Wind" (比礼ト風, "Hire to Kaze"); 036. "Two On A Snowy Day" (雪ノ日ニ二人, "Yuki no Hi ni Futari"); 037. "The State of Teito" (帝都ノ事情, "Teito no Jijō"); 038. "Reacting Sekirei Crest" (鶺鴒紋, 反応ス, "Sekirei Mon, Han'nō-su")
5	July 25, 2007	978-4-7575-2051-6	July 26, 2016 (digital); February 6, 2018 (print)	978-0-316-35809-5 (digital); 978-0-316-48006-2 (print)
039. "Eve of the Escape" (脱出前夜, "Dasshutsu Zen'ya"); 040. "Toward Happiness" (幸福ノ方向, "Shiawase no Hōkō"); 041. "'Disciplinary Squad'" ("懲罰部隊", "'Chōbatsu Butai'"); 042. "Sekirei of Red and Blue" (緋ト蒼ノ鶺鴒, "Aka to Ao no Sekirei"); 043. "Rough and Tough!" (チハヤブル!, "Chihayaburu!"); 044. "Light of the Norito" (祝詞ノ光, "Norito no Hikari"); 045. "The Magnanimous Moon" (浩然ノ月, "Kōzen no tsuki"); 046. "Vanishing Sekirei Crest" (鶺鴒紋, 消失, "Sekirei Mon, Shōshitsu"); 047. "Turning the Tide" (廻天, "Kaiten"); EXTRA "Sekirei Hot Springs" (鶺鴒温泉, "Sekirei Onsen")
6	March 25, 2008	978-4-7575-2243-5	September 27, 2016 (digital); February 6, 2018 (print)	978-0-316-35811-8 (digital); 978-0-316-48006-2 (print)
048. "Sekirei of Fate" (縁ノ鶺鴒, "Enishi no Sekirei"); 049. "Answer of the Wind" (風ノ答エ, "Kaze no Irae"); 050. "Reunion's Promise" (再会ノ約束, "Saikai no Yakusoku"); 051. "Secret Shore" (秘密ノ岸辺, "Himitsu no Kishibe"); 052. "A Man's Pride" (男ノ矜持, "Otoko no Kyōji"); 053. "Sky of Promises" (約束ノ空, "Yakusoku no Sora"); 054. "The Long Walk" (永イ散歩, "Nagai Sanpo"); 055. "Nightmarish Blaze" (悪夢ノ炎, "Akumu no Honō"); 056. "Last to be winged" (最後の壱羽, "Saigo no Ichiwa"); EXTRA "Sekirei at the Sea" (鶺鴒海水浴, "Sekirei Kaisui Yoku")
7	July 25, 2008	978-4-7575-2329-6	November 29, 2016 (digital); April 24, 2018 (print)	978-0-316-35813-2 (digital); 978-0-316-44761-4 (print)
057. "Spiraling Reaction" (螺旋ノ反応, "Rasen no Han'nō"); 058. "Seeds of Conflict" (争イノ萌芽, "Arasoi no Hōga"); 059. "Teito in Chaos" (混沌ノ帝都, "Konton no Teito"); 060. "Recognizing the True Wife" (本妻, 承認ス, "Honsai, Shōnin-su"); 061. "Natural Feelings" (アタリマエノキモチ, "Atarimae no Kimochi"); 062. "Familiar Face" (懐カシイ影, "Natsukashii Kage"); 063. "Sekirei Of Flames" (炎ノ鶺鴒, "Honō no Sekirei"); 064. "Voices of Friends" (仲間達ノ声, "Nakama-tachi no Koe"); 065. "Sound to Soothe Pain of the Heart" (胸ノ痛ミノ溶ケル音, "Mune no Itami no Tokeru Oto"); EXTRA "Sekirei Examination" (鶺鴒診断, "Sekirei Shindan")
8	February 25, 2009	978-4-7575-2498-9	January 21, 2017 (digital); April 24, 2018 (print)	978-0-316-35818-7 (digital); 978-0-316-44761-4 (print)
066. "Shape of a Soul" (魂ノカタチ, "Tamashii no Katachi"); 067. "Wife's Words" (婚グ言葉, "Kunagu Kotonoba"); 068. "Your Ashikabi" (キミノアシカビ, "Kimi no Ashikabi"); 069. "A Far Off Tale" (遠イ物語, "Tōi Monogatari"); 070. "Imprisoned Ashikabi" (囚ワレノ葦牙, "Toraware no Ashikabi"); 071. "Ashikabi's Determination" (葦牙ノ覚悟, "Ashikabi no Kakugo"); 072. "Invasion of Kamikura Island" (神座島侵攻, "Kamikura-jima Shinkō"); 073. "Game Master" (遊戯創造主, "Gēmu Masutā"); 074. "Phase Three" (第参段階, "Dai-san Dankai"); 075. "The Treasure of the Gods" (神代ノ宝, "Jindai no Takara"); EXTRA "Sekirei Halloween Parade" (セキレイ☆ハロウィン☆パレイド, "Sekirei Harovin Pareido"); EXTRA "Sekirei Yukatabira" (鶺鴒ユカタビラ, "Sekirei Yukata Bira")
9	December 25, 2009	978-4-7575-2757-7	March 28, 2017 (digital); July 24, 2018 (print)	978-0-316-31644-6 (digital); 978-0-316-44763-8 (print)
076. "Sanada of the West" (西ノ真田, "Nishi no Sanada"); 077. "Scramble" (争奪戦, "Sōdatsusen"); 078. "First Match, Decided" (第壱回戦, 決着, "Dai-ikkaisen, Ketchaku"); 079. "Memories of Yore" (古ノ記憶, "Inishie no Kioku"); 080. "Second Round" (第弐回戦, "Dai-ni Kaisen"); 081. "Skies of Conscience and the Meaning of Happiness" (呵責ノ空, 幸福ノ定義, "Kashaku no Sora, Kōfuku no Teigi"); 082. "Thoughts of You, Far Away" (想フ君遠クニ在リテ, "Omofu Kimi Tōku ni Arite"); 083. "The Northern Ashikabi" (北ノ葦牙, "Kita no Ashikabi"); 084. "The Call" (コール, "Kōru"); 085. "The Participants" (参加者達, "Sankasha-tachi"); 086. "Third Round, Start!" (第参回戦開始!, "Dai-san Kaisen Kaishi!"); EXTRA "The Hair-Raising Modifier" (戦慄ノ調整者, "Senritsu no Chōseisha")
10	June 25, 2010	978-4-7575-2914-4	May 30, 2017 (digital); July 24, 2018 (print)	978-0-316-31645-3 (digital); 978-0-316-44763-8 (print)
087. "Water and Flame" (水ト炎, "Mizu to Honō"); 088. "Norito of Flame" (炎ノ祝詞, "Honō no Norito"); 089. "Fruits of One's Pledge" (誓約ノ行方, "Seiyaku no Yukue"); 090. "Ashikabi Upheaval" (渦中ノ葦牙, "Kachū no Ashikabi"); 091. "Versus Disciplinary Squad" (vs懲罰部隊, "Bāsasu Chōbatsu Butai"); 092. "Offense and Defense" (攻防ノ戦イ, "Kōbō no Tatakai"); 093. "Black Shadow" (黒ノ影, "Kuro no Kage"); 094. "Norito of Water" (水ノ祝詞, "Mizu no Norito"); 095. "The Second Jinki" (二ツ目ノ神器, "Futatsume no Jinki"); 096. "The Far-Off Scene" (遠イ風景, "Tōi Fūkei"); EXTRA "Sekirei Hot Springs☆2 - Excitement at the Open-Air ♡ Bath" (鶺鴒温泉☆弐 露天でドッキリ♡ノ巻, "Sekirei Onsen Ni, Roten de Dokkiri no Maki")
11	December 25, 2010	978-4-7575-3105-5	July 25, 2017 (digital); October 30, 2018 (print)	978-0-316-31646-0 (digital); 978-0-316-44764-5 (print)
097. "Northern Ashikabi, On the Move" (北ノ葦牙, 動ク, "Kita no Ashikabi, Ugoku"); 098. "The Veiled Sekirei" (比礼ノ葦牙, "Hire no Sekirei"); 099. "Wings in Flight!" (雙飛ノ翼, "Sōhi no Tsubasa!"); 100. "Owner of Yore" (古ノ所有者, "Inishie no Shoyūsha"); 101. "A Glimmer of Hope" (希望ノ灯火, "Kibō no Motoshibi"); 102. "Reminiscing Demon" (追憶ノ悪魔, "Tsuioku no Akuma"); 103. "Counterattack Flag" (反撃ノ旗, "Hangeki no Hata"); 104. "Voice of a Friend" (仲間ノ声, "Nakama no Koe"); 105. "A Beloved Friend of a Loved One" (ダイスキナヒトノダイスキナトモダチ, "Daisuki na Hito no Daisuki na Tomodachi"); 106. "Welcome Home" (オカエリナサイ, "Okaerinasai"); 107. "A Place to Call Home" (イツカ帰ル場所, "Itsuka Kaeru Basho"); EXTRA "Kusano's Itty-Bitty Wonderland" (くさののちっちゃいまつり, "Kusano no Chitchai Matsuri")
12	October 25, 2011	978-4-7575-3397-4	September 26, 2017 (digital); October 30, 2018 (print)	978-0-316-36175-0 (digital); 978-0-316-44764-5 (print)
108. "The Devil's Choice" (悪魔ノ選択, "Akuma no sentaku"); 109. "Far-Off Hope" (彼方ノ希望, "Kanata no hikari"); 110. "The Girls Return" (彼女達ノ帰還, "Kanojo-tachi no kikan"); 111. "White Wings Pledge" (白翼ノ誓約, "Hakuyoku no seiyaku"); 112. "The Original Ashikabi" (原初ノ葦牙, "Gensho no Ashikabi"); 113. "Blood of Yore" (古ノ血, "Inishie no chi"); 114. "Kushimitama's Whereabouts" (奇魂ノ行方, "Kushimitama no yukue"); 115. "Wings of Determination" (決意の翼, "Ketsui no tsubasa"); 116. "Resuming" (再開, "Saikai"); 117. "The Three Ashikabi" (三人ノ葦牙, "San'nin no Ashikabi"); 118. "The Fourth Round" (第四回戦, "Dai-yon Kaisen"); 119. "Footsteps of Chaos" (混沌ノ蛩音, "Konton no Kyōon"); EXTRA. "The Tale of Black's World" (黒ノ世界ノ物語, "Kuro no Sekai no Monogatari")
13	July 25, 2012	978-4-7575-3674-6	November 28, 2017 (digital); January 22, 2019 (print)	978-0-316-36176-7 (digital); 978-0-316-44765-2 (print)
120. "Rules of the Final Round" (最終戦規則, "Saishū sen kisoku"); 121. "Sekirei Declaration!" (鶺鴒表明, "Sekirei Hyōmei"); 122. "Each of Our Wishes" (ソレゾレノネガイ, "Sorezore no negai"); 123. "Melee on Deck" (乱戦ノ船上, "Ransenno senjō"); 124. "No. 87"; 125. "Demon and Reaper" (悪魔ト死神, "Akuma to Shinigami"); 126. "When a Game's Not a Game" (遊戯外遊戯, "Yūgi Gai Yūgi"); 127. "East and South" (東ト南, "Higashi to Minami"); 128. "Old Squad Reunion" (再会ノ旧懲罰, "Saikai no Kyū Chōbatsu"); 129. "Where Strength Comes From" (強サノ行方, "Tsuyo Sano Yukue"); 130. "Sekirei's Pride" (鶺鴒ノ矜持, "Sekirei no Kyōji"); 131. "Reunion on Deck" (再会ノ船上, "Saikai no Senjō"); EXTRA "My Sekirei/South Edition" (ボクノセキレイ/南編, "Boku no Sekirei/Minami-hen")
14	March 25, 2013	978-4-7575-3909-9	January 30, 2018 (digital); January 22, 2019 (print)	978-0-316-56002-3 (digital); 978-0-316-44765-2 (print)
132. "The Final Jinki" (最後ノ神器, "Saigo no Jinki"); 133. "End of Phase Three" (第参段階完了, "Dai San Dankai Kanryō"); 134. "Sky Before the Storm" (幕間ノ空, "Makuma no Sora); 135. "Ashikabi and Sekirei (Part 1)" (葦牙ト鶺鴒（一）, "Ashikabi to Sekirei (ichi)"); 136. "Ashikabi and Sekirei (Part 2)" (葦牙ト鶺鴒（二）, "Ashikabi to Sekirei (ni)"); 137. "Empty Throne" (空ノ神座, "Sora no Shinza"); 138. "First Feelings" (最初の気持, "Saisho no Kimochi"); 139. "An Old Tale" (昔語, "Mukashigatari"); 140. "Island Under the Heavens" (下天ノ島, "Geten no Shima"); 141. "Landfall" (上陸, "Jōriku"); EXTRA. "The Bride of Izumo Inn" (出雲荘ノ花嫁, "Izumo-sō no Hanayome"); EXTRA. "Celebration" (祝ノ日, "Iwai no Hi")
15	November 25, 2013	978-4-7575-4142-9	March 27, 2018 (digital); April 23, 2019 (print)	978-0-316-56004-7 (digital); 978-0-316-44766-9 (print)
142. "The Eighth Ashikabi" (八人目ノ葦牙, "Hachi-Nin-me no Ashikabi"); 143. "Stage Two" (ステージ2, "Sutēji 2"); 144. "Bloodstained Wings" (血塗レイ羽, "Chinu Rei Hane"); 145. "A Certain Ashikabi" (或ル葦牙の場合, "Aru Ashikabi no Baai"); 146. "Joined Hands, Joined Bonds" (結ブ手結ブ絆, "Musubu Te Musubu Kizuna"); 147. "The Power of Bonds" (キズナノチカラ, "Kizuna no Chikara")\; 148. "Linked Hearts" (繋がる心念, "Tsunagaru Kokoro"); 149. "Loving Spirit, Rough Spirit" (恋魂荒魂, "Koi Mitama Ara Mitama"); 150. "Queen of Sekirei" (鶺鴒ノ女王, "Sekirei no Joō"); 151. "Tactician and Muscle-Brained Idiots" (策士ト脳筋, "Sakushi to Nōsuji"); 152. "Ace in the Hole" (カクシダマ, "Kakushidama")
16	June 25, 2014	978-4-7575-4312-6	May 29, 2018 (digital); April 23, 2019 (print)	978-0-316-56005-4 (digital); 978-0-316-44766-9 (print)
153. "Broken Sekirei of the South" (南ノコワイセキレイ, "Minami no Kowai Sekirei"); 154. "Your Voice, Calling to Me" (私ヲ呼ブアナタノ声, "Watashi o Yobu Anata no Koe"); 155. "Wings of Ice, Dancing in the Sky" (氷羽魔ウ空, "Kōri no Hane ma u Sora"); 156. "Qualified Ashikabi" (葦牙ノ資格, "Ashikabi no Shikaku"); 157. "Haves and Have-Nots" (持ツ者、持タザル者, "Motsumono, Motazarumono"); 158. "Where the True Battle Lies" (本気ノ戦イノ行方, "Honki no Tatakai no Yukue"); 159. "In the Abyss of Kamikura Island" (神蔵島ノ深淵ノ中, "Kamikura-Jima No Shin'en No Naka"); 160. "People Wishing to Know Others, Sekirei Wishing to Know Love" (人ハ人ヲ知リテ人ト菜リ、鶺鴒ハ愛ヲ知リテ鶺鴒ト菜ル, "Hito Ha Hito O Shirite Hito Tonari, Sekirei Ha Ai O Shirite Sekirei Tonaru"); 161. "The One Standing Before You" (アナタノマエニタツノハ, "Anata no Maeni Tatsunoha"); 162. "Light from the Heavens" (天空カラノ光, "Tenkū Kara no Hikari"); 163. "Red Flower, Blue Flower" (紅イ花、蒼イ花, "Akai Hana, Aoi Hana")
17	March 25, 2015	978-4-7575-4549-6	July 31, 2018 (digital); September 3, 2019 (print)	978-0-316-56009-2 (digital); 978-0-316-44767-6 (print)
164. "Gathering in Teito" (集結ノ帝都, "Shūketsu no teito"); 165. "The Fourth Invasion of Kamikura Island" (第四次神座島侵攻, "Dai Yonji Kanza tō Shinkō"); 166. "Light to Rend the Heavens" (第四次神座島侵攻, "Ten o Saku Hikari"); 167. "A Norito to Swallow the Sea" (海ヲ呑ム祝詞, "Umi o Nomu Norito"); 168. "The Way of the Ashikabi" (葦牙ノ理, "Ashikabi no Ri"); 169. "Those With Wings of Light" (光ノ羽持ツ者達, "Hikari no hane ji Monotachi"); 170. "Toyoashihara Island" (豊葦原ノ島, "Toyoashihara no Shima"); 171. "Awaken, Light" (ヒカリ、サザメク, "Hikari, sazameku"); 172. "Hollow Land, Birth of Bonds" (虚ロノ地,絆ノ始マリ, "Kyo ro no ji, kizuna no hajime mari"); 173. "Wings of the Reaper" (死神ノ羽, "Shinigami no hane"); 174. "The Source of My Pride" (ワタシノ矜持ノモトニ, "Watashino kyōji nomotoni"); 175. "Shine On, Maidens" (乙女、爆閃, "Otome bakusen"); 176. "Jinki Overload"
18	October 24, 2015	978-4-7575-4772-8	September 25, 2018 (digital); September 3, 2019 (print)	978-0-316-56011-5 (digital); 978-0-316-44767-6 (print)
177. "Minato Sahashi's Choice" (佐橋皆人ノ選択, "Satoshi Minato no sentaku"); 178. "Riding on a Hope" (ネガイ、ノセテ, "Negai, nosete"); 179. "To Kouten!" (嵩天へ!, "Sūten e!"); 180. "The Final Pair" (最後ノ一人ト一羽 (サイゴ ノ ヒトリ トイチク), "Saigo no ichi-ri toichi-wa (saigo no hitori toichiku)"); 181. "Final Battle on Kouten" (決戦ノ嵩天, "Kessen no sūten"); 182. "The Last Wish" (最後ノ願イハ, "Saigo no gan iha"); 183. "Ode (Part 1)" (祝歌 (壱), "Hogiuta (ichi)"); 184. "Ode (Part 2)" (祝歌 (弐), "Hogiuta (ni)"); 185. "Ode (Part 3)" (祝歌 (参), "Hogiuta (san)"); 186. "Ode (Part 4)" (186話 祝歌 (肆), "186 wa shukuka"); 187. "Life with You, All of You" (キミト、キミタチト、生キテユク, "Kimito, kimitachito-sei kiteyuku")
19	April 25, 2018	978-4-7575-5711-6	November 27, 2018 (digital); November 12, 2019 (print)	978-1-9753-2942-6 (digital); 978-1-9753-3208-2 (print)
1. "Reactivation" (""); 2. "Bride's Dawn" (""); 3. "Modifier from Hell" (""); 4. "Melancholy of Wind" (""); 5. "A Talk with Sekirei No. 02" (""); 6. "Everyone in Love Gets Along" (""); 7. "Shadows Threatening Love" (""); 8. "Ashikabi Festival" (""); 9. "Sekirei Festival" (""); 10. "Star-Joined Celebration" (""); 11. "Epilogue: Together Forever, Wherever" ("")
