= Mizunagi =

Mizunagi (Japanese: みずなぎ) may refer to:

- Mizunagi (airplane) (tail number: JA722A; Japanese: みずなぎ1号), a Japan Coast Guard dHC Dash-8 twin turboprop involved in a 2 January 2024 runway collision at Haneda
- Ryuu Mizunagi (Japanese: 水薙 竜, romanized: Mizunagi Ryū), Japanese mangaka, creator of the Japanese serialized manga comic book Witchcraft Works
- Mizunagi Shrine, a fictional location in Natsume's Book of Friends; see List of Natsume's Book of Friends episodes
- Mizunagi (Japanese: 水生), a fictional character from the Japanese manga and card game Juvenile Orion

== See also ==
- The dictionary definition of 水生 at Wiktionary
