= Aquarian Age: Sign for Evolution =

Media franchise based on the collectible card game of the same name

アクエリアンエイジ Sign for Evolution (Akuerian Eiji Sign for Evolution)
- Genre: Science fiction
- Created by: Broccoli
- Anime television series
- Directed by: Yoshimitsu Ōhashi
- Produced by: Shigeru Kitayama; Masao Morosawa; Hiroyasu Kobayashi
- Written by: Kazuhiko Sōma
- Music by: Yuki Kajiura
- Studio: Madhouse
- Licensed by: NA, UK: ADV Films
- Original network: TV Tokyo
- Original run: 4 January 2002 – 29 March 2002
- Episodes: 13
- Original video animation

Aquarian Age: The Movie
- Directed by: Fumie Muroi
- Produced by: Kaname Tezuka; Hiromichi Masuda
- Written by: Kazuhiko Sōma
- Music by: NARASAKI
- Studio: Madhouse
- Licensed by: NA: ADV Films
- Released: 21 November 2003
- Runtime: 60 minutes
- Related manga
- Juvenile Orion (spin-off)

Aquarian Age: Sign for Evolution (アクエリアンエイジ Sign for Evolution, Akuerian Eiji Sign for Evolution) is a 13-episode television anime series based on the Aquarian Age collectible card game. The show was co-produced by Broccoli and Madhouse and aired in early 2002 on TV Tokyo. ADV Films released the show in the United States on DVD in three volumes containing both English subtitled and dubbed versions. A trailer for a live action movie was released in 2008. The Aquarian Age: Juvenile Orion movie was released on March 29, 2008.

== Plot ==
The story centers on high school student and band vocalist Kamikurata Kyouta, and how he stumbles on a secret war being waged by mysterious girls with otherworldly powers. Kyouta later forms a band named T.L. Signal with his friends Kojima Junichi and Hirota Shingo. Kyouta's band works for a company named CosmoPop. Junichi plays the keyboard and Shingo is the guitarist of the band. Things grow even more complicated when he discovers his girlfriend Sannou Yoriko might be the key to the war.

== Media ==
=== Manga ===
The stand-alone manga Juvenile Orion occurs in the broader Aquarian Age universe, but is unrelated to Aquarian Age: Sign for Evolution.

=== Anime ===
No.	Title	Directed by	Written by	Original release date
1	"Deep Blue Overture"; Transliteration: "Shinsei no jokyoku" (Japanese: 深青(しんせい)の序曲)	Yoshimitsu Ōhashi	Kazuhiko Sōma	4 January 2002
Kyouta and his band "T.L. Signal" get together to practice for a street concert on New Year's Day. During the events that lead up to this concert, both Kyouta and his childhood friend Yoriko notice a series of strange psychic turbulences, but Kyouta doesn't realize what they mean and Yoriko denies their existence.
2	"Fire Green Premonition"; Transliteration: "Enryoku no yokan" (Japanese: 炎緑(えんりょく)の予感)	Fumihiro Ueno	Daisuke Aranishi	11 January 2002
The highly successful New Year's concert comes to a close with a cacophony of broken glass and several battles between various factions. Misato watches all of this and afterwards offers the band an opportunity to record a demo at her studio, where Kyouta meets his idol. Others have also been watching: Yoriko has caught Abuto's attention, and we see that Kiriko is one of the mysterious girls from Kyouta's visions.
3	"Cloudy Red Melancholy"; Transliteration: "Dakuseki no yūutsu" (Japanese: 濁赤(だくせき)の憂鬱)	Kō Matsuo	Shōgo Mukai	18 January 2002
Misato gets T.L. Signal a guest spot on a radio show. Kyouta invites Yoriko to come and watch, but while there she is told by Misato to stay away from Kyouta. Kiriko listens with her best friend Asumi and is strongly affected, along with a horde of other girls.
4	"Concealment Black Offering"; Transliteration: "Senkoku no kumotsu" (Japanese: 潜黒(せんこく)の供物)	Kenichi Ishikura	Kazuyuki Fudeyasu	25 January 2002
T.L. Signal goes to see a live concert featuring Kanae and Ryuusei. Abuto and Kanae meet them there in a hallway. Under psychic attack by Kanae, Misato reveals her true form as an Eraser, terrifying Abuto and stunning Kyouta. Yoriko reaches some conclusions after Rumiko's lectures on accepting destiny, and resolves not to see Kyouta anymore.
5	"Sparkling White Inevitability"; Transliteration: "Senpaku no hitsuzen" (Japanese: 閃白(せんぱく)の必然)	Shigeki Hatakeyama	Kazuhiko Sōma	1 February 2002
Rumiko tells Kyouta to stay away from Yoriko. WIZ-DOM charms Asumi into going after Kyouta. As they are talking, the two are cornered by a group of fangirls and forced to run away.
6	"Illusion Green Salvation"; Transliteration: "Genryoku no kyūsai" (Japanese: 幻緑(げんりょく)の救済)	Yoshito Hata	Daisuke Aranishi	8 February 2002
Asumi becomes an employee of Cosmopop. A Darklore attacks Yoriko and just as she is awakened as Benzaiten, Mindbreaker Abuto show up to rescue her. He takes her out for coffee and in an attempt to gain control over her reveals that the Arayashiki have hidden something from her.
7	"Deep Red Offshoot"; Transliteration: "Shinku no bunketsu" (Japanese: 深紅(しんく)の分蘖)	Fumihiro Ueno	Kazuhiko Sōma	15 February 2002
Kyouta is so depressed by the situation with Yoriko that he starts skipping practice. Yoriko starts acting and shows a totally different personality. Elsewhere, WIZ-DOM attempts to remove Jun'ichi and Shingo.
8	"Light Purple Awakening"; Transliteration: "Hakushi no kakusei" (Japanese: 薄紫(はくし)の覚醒)	Kō Matsuo	Daisuke Aranishi	22 February 2002
After the news about Yoriko is discovered, infighting erupts among the Arayashiki and no one knows which direction to go in. Rumiko tells Kyouta that he is the only one who can save Yoriko.
9	"Procession Silver Remnants"; Transliteration: "Retsugin no zanei" (Japanese: 烈銀(れつぎん)の残影)	Takeshi Yamaguchi	Shōgo Mukai	1 March 2002
Now all the girls are ascending to the stage: Yoriko is chosen for a leading role; Asumi is cast in that same movie; and Kiriko is scouted as a model.
10	"Yellow Green Suffering World"; Transliteration: "Moegi no shigan" (Japanese: 萌黄(もえぎ)の此岸)	Kōji Aritomi	Kazuhiko Sōma	8 March 2002
Kyouta thinks his powers are worthless. Little does he know but they are being demonstrated as his song empowers Kiriko to become a model. This sends the power-jealous Abuto into a rage, and he sends Kanae to attack T.L. Signal.
11	"Indigo Green Vortex"; Transliteration: "Ranpeki no kadō" (Japanese: 藍碧(らんぺき)の渦動)	Tomio Yamauchi	Kenji Sugihara	15 March 2002
Yoriko continues to hurt other actors and fights Asumi once again, sending her into a coma. Kyouta has lost his touch and completely abandons T.L. Signal in his frustration. Wandering the city he sees Kiriko, who tells him what his music has done for her.
12	"Faded Red Conflict"; Transliteration: "Arazome no kattō" (Japanese: 退紅(あらぞめ)の葛藤)	Masashi Kojima	Shōgo Mukai	22 March 2002
With the encouragement of Kiriko and Asumi, Kyouta rejoins the band for their debut. But the debut is delayed as Kyouta, Asumi, Kiriko, and Rumiko begin a fight with Yoriko to bring her back to herself.
13	"Purity White Embrace"; Transliteration: "Junpaku no hōyō" (Japanese: 純白(じゅんぱく)の抱擁)	Yoshimitsu Ōhashi	Kazuhiko Sōma	29 March 2002
Rumiko explains that Yoriko is not dead yet and Kyouta attempts to call her back to the living world.

=== Music ===
The background music is composed by Yuki Kajiura, also known for the background music from Noir and the second and third episodes of the Xenosaga game trilogy. The 2008 live-action film's main theme is Mirror Ball by Japanese rock group Alice Nine.
