= Sensitive Pornograph =

Japanese anime OVA

- Cover of Sensitive Pornograph manga

センシティブ・ポルノグラフ (Senshitibu Porunogurafu)
- Genre: Yaoi, Slice of life, Romance, Erotica
- Manga
- Written by: Ashika Sakura
- Published by: June-NET
- Magazine: June Comics Piace Series
- Published: 2003
- Volumes: 1
- Original video animation
- Music by: Masamichi Amano
- Studio: Phoenix Entertainment
- Released: December 20, 2004
- Runtime: 30 minutes

Sensitive Pornograph (センシティブ・ポルノグラフ, Senshitibu Porunogurafu) is a Japanese yaoi anime OVA based on a BL manga anthology of short stories by Ashika Sakura, who also authored the manga series Sekirei under her other pen-name, Sakurako Gokurakuin. It has one episode which is made up of two separate and unconnected parts, the title story and the fifth story in the book, "Trophies Belong in the Bedroom". It was animated by Phoenix Entertainment.

The whole OVA is 27 minutes long and, unlike the original manga, is much more explicit in nature, giving it an R-18/X/NC-17 rating in both the US and Japan.

== Part 1 ==
Sensitive Pornograph

The story begins with Seiji Yamada (Voiced by: Kenichi Suzumura), a young shōnen manga artist, who develops an affair with a fellow manga artist, who writes hentai, named Sono Hanasaki (Voiced by: Kishou Taniyama), who is also his favorite artist. The plot-line develops from Yamada mistaking Sono for a girl. After having discovered him to be a boy, Seiji still falls in love with him, and they have an intimate affair. Seiji becomes distraught when he learns of Sono's past tendencies of sleeping around, and for a time the two become separated. However, they eventually reconcile after Seiji learns of the emotional damage Sono has suffered as a result of being abandoned and used only for sex and his body.

This part is longer with a more romantic tone than the other. There is quite a large amount of humor while still containing graphic sex and sexual positions throughout the entire story, available in both censored and uncensored versions. Also in some versions, the order of the stories is reversed.

== Part 2 ==
"House of the Little White Rabbit"

The second part begins with Ueno, a student in college, who works part-time as a pet sitter, receiving an assignment to take care of a rabbit.

Upon arriving at the specified address, looking for a rabbit named Aki-chan, he finds that there is no rabbit. Instead he discovers a young man bound, naked, in a closet, apparently a sex slave to the man who hired Ueno. Aki-chan is chagrined to realize that his lover-master has created a twist on a sexual thrill situation for himself – he has sent strangers to Aki-chan for sex before, but tricking someone into the apartment was something new. Aki-chan knows his master wants to watch from a distance while Aki-chan has sex with the duped Ueno. Explaining that his master will get mad if things don't go his way, and may even hurt Ueno, Aki-chan persuades him to have sex to keep his master happy. In a car outside the building, the master, smirking, watches the two via a hidden camera. Initially just expecting Ueno to lie back and allow him to do all the work (something Aki-chan seems accustomed to), he is surprised when Ueno reciprocates and takes the active role. After making passionate love and even sharing a kiss, Aki-chan then encourages Ueno to leave before his master returns. After Ueno reluctantly leaves and his master shows up, Aki-chan angrily announces that he thought himself open-minded, but has had enough of the manipulative head games.

At some unspecified time later, Ueno recalls that he quit his job (or was fired, depending on some versions). He then encounters Aki-chan at his school, which surprises him. Aki-chan tells him that he defied his master, was severely beaten and thrown out, and has since enrolled himself at Ueno's school. The scene ends with hints that the two may continue their relationship.

== Characters ==
Seiji Yamada (山田征二 Yamada Seiji) voiced by Kenichi Suzumura

Sono Hanasaki (花崎園 Hanasaki Sono) voiced by Kishō Taniyama

Aki Ayamatsu (綾松 秋 Ayamatsu Aki) voiced by Nobuyuki Hiyama

Koji Ueno (植野宏二 Ueno Koji) voiced by Shinji Kawada

Yasuda (安田)

== Official Websites ==
- (DVD info on Slash's website)
- (list of characters and character designs)
