= Freaks (manga) =

Japanese manga series

- Category: Freaks
- Category: Freaks volume 2 cover as published by DrMaster.

カテゴリ:フリークス (Kategori: Furīkusu)
- Genre: Occult detective fiction
- Manga
- Written by: Ashika Sakura
- Published by: Gentosha
- English publisher: NA: ComicsOne DrMaster
- Magazine: Comic Birz
- Original run: 2002 – 2009
- Volumes: 4

Category: Freaks (Japanese: カテゴリ:フリークス, Hepburn: Kategori: Furīkusu), also known as Category Freaks, is a manga series created by Ashika Sakura and published in Comic Birz from 2002 to 2009.

The manga is published in the United States by DrMaster since the company took over most of ComicsOne's manga and manhua titles. It was also licensed in Russia by Comix-ART.

== Plot ==
Supernatural phenomena and strange occurrences are no sweat for the Nanami Paranormal Investigation agency, headed by Asagi Nanami. As "freak" activity grows to a terrifying fever pitch, Asagi's assistants—Naoki, Tokiko, and Mahime—help to solve several major "freak" cases. Freaks are creatures with the ability to possess humans and prey on their weaknesses. However, Asagi and his gang are no ordinary humans; each is equipped with a special power to vanquish Freaks.

== Characters ==
- Asagi Nanami: Director of the Nanami Paranormal Investigation agency. Voiced by: Akira Ishida (Drama CD)
- Naoki Amano: The only normal human being in the office. Voiced by: Daisuke Ono (Drama CD)
- Tokiko: A bunny girl in charge of cleaning up freaks' corpses after Asagi defeats them. She eats up every bit of the "freak", making the scene nice and clean again. Voiced by: Yukari Tamura (Drama CD)
- Mahime Yoshino/Yahiro: Mahime is a helper in the office, and Yahiro is her alter-ego. Where Mahime is shy and reserved, Yahiro is cool and comes out when Mahime has a tough time dealing with the situation. Voiced by: Hōko Kuwashima (Drama CD)
- "Freaks": Freaks are beings, fiends, who possess humans on their weakness and help them turn their deepest darkest desire into reality.
- Izumi: An ancient. Can create freaks. He can merge with Asagi as his Remitter, and help him control his powers so that Asagi doesn't commit overkill. Voiced by: Kousuke Toriumi (Drama CD)

== Drama CD ==
A Drama CD was released by Geneon on April 25, 2007.

== Reception ==
Carlo Santos from Anime News Network criticized the lack of originality, saying "Without the coolness of xxxHOLiC, the charm of Tactics, or even the insanity of Bleach's Karakura Superheroes, Category: Freaks will just have to get in line behind all the other paranormal spirit-hunting series out there" in his first volume review. However, when reviewing the second volume he commented the manga "finds its niche", and despite being similar to other manga, Santos said it "has a unique tone—not too melodramatic, not too gloomy, but streetwise and cynical as befits a modern supernatural sleuth." Mania.com's Eduardo M. Chavez praised the way Sakurako Gokurakuin "infuses comedy into each case by challenging her readers' ideas of what an investigator should and should not do or be", and noted it "fills a void for investigative manga and horror manga and it does it with style, humor and eclectic cast."
