= Aquarian Age =

Japanese collectible trading card game

Aquarian Age (アクエリアンエイジ, Akuerian Eiji) is an out-of-print Japanese collectible trading card game. It is marketed and produced by Broccoli, which produces games and Anime-related goods.

In the game, the player takes the role of a "Mindbreaker", who can control and unlock the powers of the game characters. The goal is to defeat other Mindbreakers (players) and to grow stronger. The game continues until the player has defeated all of their opponents, or has been stripped of their powers; thus being knocked out of the game.

Unlike similar TCG, the player fields game characters instead of spells. They must gain control over each character before it can be used in a game. If a player is unable to control a character properly, it may turn on them.

The Aquarian Age franchise now supports a PlayStation game, a comic book, and a TV series; Aquarian Age: Sign for Evolution featuring a musical score by composer Yuki Kajiura.

== Story ==
As far as the history of humanity is concerned, there has always been war. Conflicts overt and covert, known and secret, battles fought that would influence the histories of future generations. Across centuries, three secret but powerful organizations have fought for control, even as mere mortal forces struggled with their own petty wars and attempts at grandeur. These three forces have worked to shape mankind's destiny with their powers of magery, savagery, and mysticism all the while keeping away from the eyes of those they control.

Each force was a counterbalance to the other. Arayashiki represented the mysticism of the Eastern world. WIZ-DOM subsisted on the magicks of the Western world. Finally there were the inhuman Darklore, from which tales of were-beasts and changelings abound. Each faction, however, sought also to duel with the others for control and power. Using both their abilities, and their influence over those they controlled, these forces caused many of the great battles humanity knows as part of its bloodstained history. Today, two millennia since it had begun, these three forces were locked in stalemate.

The year 2000 AD, the opening of the 21st century. The Age of Aquarius which astrologers had long since foretold, had finally arrived. Some believe it to be an age of peace, a new world order. Others proclaim it as the coming of the biblical end times. Whatever truth it would be, the Aquarian Age is the age of great changes, during which the shape of humankind would never be the same. From this generation emerged a new breed of human, one with the ability to influence objects and other people with the mere power of their minds. Calling themselves E.G.O., this group of psionics claimed to represent the new evolution in humankind, a new faction that challenged the existing triumvirate for the power to shape destiny.

Another group also emerged; Individuals who have the gift to both empower and control members of the other factions, and using them to fight their battles. This unaligned group's members gained control of agents from the previous groups, just as those factions once did mortal men. These were the Mindbreakers, who were loyal to no one but themselves, and served their own personal agendas.

In the midst of this new turmoil was thrown a new and unquantified faction. From the heavens came an alien force of great power, their apparent goal to destroy the human species. Despite this, these aliens have not openly attacked, alternating between study of the four factions and the Mindbreakers, and actively participating in the battles. This mysterious force with no clear goals or purpose, was dubbed Eraser by the other factions due to their terrifying power.

During the chaotic period known in Western astrology as the Aquarian Age, the alien ERASER fleet attacks Earth, ravaging cities. However, a counteroffensive is launched. The four factions - ARAYASHIKI, WIZ-DOM, DARKLORE, and E.G.O. - who have previously been fighting each other for control of Earth, join forces to defeat the ERASERS.

In the aftermath of the conflict, Earth is placed under the unified rule of the Polestar Empire. However, peace is shattered when the Empire begins to use forbidden magic. These dark powers cause dimensional rifts around the world and once again plunge Earth into chaos and warfare.

== Anime ==
Aquarian Age was adapted into an animated Japanese television series, Aquarian Age: Sign for Evolution.

== Factions of the Aquarian Age ==
=== Arayashiki ===
The Arayashiki represent the eastern mages, primarily the onmyouji, who practice magic in theory with the Tao (Yin and Yang). Most of the members of this group seem to primarily represent Japanese mystics, but Chinese (and maybe even Indian) mages are included as well.

Although not as widespread as E.G.O., most Arayashiki members are quite commonly found, even ignored, in modern Asian society. Most of their kind occupy Asia as a whole, with particular concentrations in Japan and China (two of the most socio-politically developed nations in the region). Typical Arayashiki skills include the ability to commune with spirits and nature, all inclined towards the Eastern forms of magic (such as onmyoujitsu). Some are even skilled with martial arts of varying types, as well as Eastern (particularly Japanese) archaic weaponry.

Common types of Arayashiki are: Miko (Japanese shrine-maidens) and other spiritually-inclined occupations. Many martial arts practitioners of the esoteric bent, especially the infamous Ninja, are also surprisingly common among them as bodyguards and spies. Of particular note is that members of the Ainu indigenous tribes of northern Japan also figure quite strongly with them. The remainder of the Arayashiki consist of spirits, especially those of various Asian mythological figures.

The Arayashiki are highly traditionalist, and clash constantly with their direct western opposite, the WIZ-DOM.

The name "Arayashiki" most likely comes from the Japanese word for the Buddhist Yogacharan concept of a store consciousness, the idea that karmic occurrences are "stored" in the unconscious and affect our karma and perceptions of the world.

=== WIZ-DOM ===
The members of WIZ-DOM represent western magery, which includes (but is not limited to) pagan, druidic, and even kabbalistic magic. These will be quite familiar to people in the west, as they go by many terms such as witches, warlocks, wizards, and all other European-influenced symbols of magery.

WIZ-DOM members hail from all sects of western magic. Some might even be disguised as clerics of an established religion; although whether they are really part of these religions (WIZ-DOM members have been seen in both Catholic and Protestant denominations), it remains to be seen whether these are genuine alliances or mere cover for their true nature.

WIZ-DOM members seem to be rather isolated from most of society. Since their magic is of the western variety, skilled in a wide variety of occult practices. Common WIZ-DOM archetypes include sorceresses, alchemists, priestesses, knights, spirits and ghosts, and artificial beings (such as elementals and golems) created via magic. There are also a lot of scholars, as well as people proficient in fortune-telling techniques and archaic western weaponry.

Western magic emphasises control over the magical forces (as opposed to the emphasis on harmony espoused by Eastern magic and shamanism). WIZ-DOM considers the Arayashiki their mortal enemy. They fight for their own ways and their own homelands and care little for anything else. Well, except power, that is.

=== Darklore ===
The Darklore faction consists of demihumans and monsters. Under these are the werewolves and other were-creatures, as well as non-humans such as faeries, mermaids and (possibly) elves. Theoretically, they may be the oldest faction among the five, hinting at a pre-human background, but this is still to be confirmed.

An extremely varied faction, Darklore is a conglomeration of ancient, forgotten races. Elves, lycanthropes (were-creatures), demons, mermaids, vampires, oni, fairies, even undead. Almost every beast or creature recounted in tales and myths can draw their origin from Darklore sightings. Obviously, only the more human members of Darklore (such as lycanthropes, which change from beast to human at will) can assimilate with human society. Everything but angels and dragons can be lumped under Darklore. Some ancient gods including Ba'al are included as Darklore

Typical skills vary widely, depending on race and disposition, but there's a lot of magical power to be found here, usually magic inherent to a given species.

The creatures of the Darklore faction want the world that was once theirs back, basically to retake earth from what they see as the human taint. Their principal enemies are the WIZ-DOM and Arayashiki, with whom they have fought for centuries.

=== E.G.O. ===
The group E.G.O. is the newest faction to enter the conflict. They claim to be the next level of human evolution, and possess powerful psionic abilities. Also siding with them are androids (artificial humanoids) and cyborgs, the technology of whom might have been taken from Eraser. It's interesting to note that most E.G.O. members appear to be the youngest among those involved in this fight, most of them barely in their late teens yet possessing extensive psionic abilities, among other skills.

E.G.O. members are in plain sight and never seen. This is because unlike the isolationist WIZ-DOM or the inhuman Darklore, they are quite sociable, human, and ordinary for the most part. They can be schoolchildren, celebrities, military personnel, teachers, scientists, police, criminals (!), or even menial laborers (waiters/waitresses, maids, etc.). One would never really if the person you're talking to know was part of E.G.O. Assorted androids and cyborgs (presumably taken from Eraser) are also among them, well-hidden.

E.G.O. members with occupations tend to be "the best in their fields" (for instance, scientists on the cutting edge of technology—or ahead of it). Typical skills and powers include proficiency with modern or even futuristic (probably more Eraser technology) weapons, knowledge of cybernetics, telekinesis and other psychic powers, and genetic enhancements (Eraser/human hybrids, for example).

The E.G.O. claim to fight for the next generation, for the future of humanity, and they see themselves as the embodiment of that future. They harass the Erasers frequently, and generally take a dim view of the three "old" factions, on account of them being outdated.

NOTE: The name E.G.O. was originally coined for an all-female group, or "Evolutionary Girls Organization". With the Juvenile Orion expansion and its all-male additional characters, this just didn't jibe. As of the second series (Aquarian Age Saga II), the group will include both male and female members, and henceforth will be referred to as the "Evolutionary Generation Organization".

=== Eraser ===
The final faction is known as Eraser, the only non-earth based faction. This is the name assigned to them by the other four factions, due to their sheer power. Despite all this power, and their open hostility towards the other four factions, Eraser's true origins are unknown, their actions intermittent, and their motives unclear, save for a claim that it plans to eradicate humanity. All that is known is that they are completely alien to the other factions, and for some reason, has decided to involve itself in their power struggles.

Physical descriptions of Eraser vary, but the most notable are the 'Angels', that appear very much like the human interpretation of angels, and their immediate subordinates, a reptiloid race that have been called the 'Dragoons'. They have technology advanced enough that androids, cyborgs, and clones have been manufactured, presumably to act as infiltrators studying the human race and are occasionally involved in the battles. E.G.O. has somehow managed to gain access to some of this technology, which may explain the existence of cyborgs and androids among the E.G.O. as well.

Powers and skills among Angel Erasers vary, but they usually rely heavily on advanced science and technology, particularly weapons development. They also seem to possess the power to create "miracles", such as the ability to stop time. The Dragoon Erasers are much simpler (one may say brutish)--they are an out and out warrior race; when they do use high technology, it's almost always in the form of weapons given to them by the Angels. The androids, cyborgs and clones do whatever the Erasers design them to do, and that covers a wide range of tasks.

There have been many references hinting that Eraser possesses a large battlefleet and that this is but one of the many planets they have encountered. It is possible that Eraser is studying the other four factions and the Mindbreakers (especially the latter, due to their unique abilities), but as to what reason, one can only hazard a guess.

The Erasers are engaged mostly in fighting the E.G.O. The older factions, occupied with their own battles, take little notice of them; the Erasers pay them little heed in return. But the Erasers wish to destroy humanity, and the E.G.O. - self-proclaimed guardians of humanity's future - have risen up to stop them.

Towards the end of the first Aquarian Age Saga, Eraser has been driven off by the four Earthbound Factions and Mindbreakers. It is currently unknown whether they will return at a later date.

=== Mindbreakers ===
The Mindbreakers are an interesting new group involved in this battle. They are a group of men and women who have an odd ability; the power to unlock the potential powers of the Arayashiki, WIZ-DOM, Darklore, E.G.O., and even Eraser factions, as well as to somehow gain control of them. They are not a faction like the other five, since each Mindbreaker has his or her own goals and purposes to achieve, as well as methods to achieve them. This often leads Mindbreakers to battle each other. The victor of such a battle gains the loser's power—the members of Arayashiki, WIZ-DOM, Darklore, E.G.O. and Eraser previously under the loser's control.

Precisely how a Mindbreaker controls one of these factions, much less how they can awaken the new powers within them, is still unknown. Speculation ranges anywhere from advanced psionic powers to emotional attachment. There's no single rule to explain this ability yet, but the presence of a mindbreaker favoring a member of the previously mentioned factions is often enough to tip the balance in a battle.

In the Saga II game, the player assumes the role of Mindbreaker, controlling the characters through use of cards.

=== Polestar Empire ===
The "Empire" faction is a group of invaders from another dimension, another Earth with a different history. They are fantasy-inspired characters, such as knights, dragons and the undead. Like Eraser, their ultimate goals are unknown.

The Empire faction was introduced in the Saga II series, a 'reboot' of the Aquarian Age card game that integrates the male characters seen in Juvenile Orion with regular Aquarian age gameplay.
