= List of Natsume's Book of Friends episodes =

Key visual for the series

Natsume's Book of Friends is a Japanese anime television series based on Yuki Midorikawa's manga series Natsume's Book of Friends. The first four seasons were produced by Brain's Base, under the direction of Takahiro Omori, while from the fifth season onwards the series have been produced by Shuka, under the direction of Kotomi Deai (seasons 5 and 6) and Hideki Ito (season 7). Its seven seasons have been broadcast on TV Tokyo. The first 13-episode season aired from July 8 to September 30, 2008. (Note: TV Tokyo listed the air dates for the series on Monday at 25:00, which is effectively Tuesday at 1:00 a.m. JST.) For the first season, the opening theme is "Issei no Sei" (一斉の声; lit. 'Simultaneous Voice') by Shūhei Kita, and the ending theme is "Natsu Yūzora" (夏夕空; lit. 'Summer Evening Sky') by Kousuke Atari.

The second 13-episode season, Natsume's Book of Friends Continued (続 夏目友人帳, Zoku Natsume Yūjin-chō), aired from January 6 to March 31, 2009. (Note: TV Tokyo listed the air dates for the series on Monday at 25:00, which is effectively Tuesday at 1:00 a.m. JST.) For the second season, the opening theme is "Ano Hi Time Machine" (あの日タイムマシン; lit. 'That Day's Time Machine') by Long Shot Party and the ending theme is "Aishiteru" (愛してる; lit. 'I Love You') by Callin.

The third season 13-episode season, Natsume's Book of Friends Three (夏目友人帳 参, Natsume Yūjin-chō San) aired from July 5 to September 27, 2011. (Note: TV Tokyo listed the air dates for the series on Monday at 25:30, which is effectively Tuesday at 1:30 a.m. JST.) For the third season, the opening theme is "Boku ni Dekiru Koto" (僕にできること; lit. 'I Can Do') by How Merry Marry and the ending theme is "Kimi no Kakera" (君ノカケラ; lit. 'Pieces of You') by Kousuke Atari featuring Emiri Miyamoto.

The fourth 13-episode season, Natsume's Book of Friends Four (夏目友人帳 肆, Natsume Yūjin-chō Shi) aired from January 3 to March 27, 2012. (Note: TV Tokyo listed the air dates for the series on Monday at 25:30, which is effectively Tuesday at 1:30 a.m. JST.) For the fourth season, the opening theme is "Ima, Kono Toki" (今、このとき。; lit. 'Now, This Time') by Hiiragi and the ending theme is "Takaramono" (たからもの; lit. 'Treasure') by Marina Kawano.

The fifth 11-episode season, Natsume's Book of Friends Five (夏目友人帳 伍, Natsume Yūjin-chō Go) aired from October 5 to December 21, 2016; (Note: TV Tokyo listed the air dates for the series on Tuesday at 25:35, which is effectively Wednesday at 1:35 a.m. JST.) For the fifth season, the opening theme is "Takarabako" (タカラバコ; lit. 'Treasure Chest') by Sasanomaly and the ending theme is "Akane Sasu" (茜さす; lit. 'Crimson Painted') by Aimer.

The sixth 11-episode season, Natsume's Book of Friends Six (夏目友人帳 陸, Natsume Yūjin-chō Roku), aired from April 12 to June 21, 2017. (Note: TV Tokyo listed the air dates for the series on Tuesday at 25:35, which is effectively Wednesday at 1:35 a.m. JST.) For the sixth season, the opening theme is "Floria" (フローリア, Furōria) by Tomohisa Sako and the ending theme is "Kimi no Uta" (きみのうた; lit. 'Your Song') by Rei Yasuda.

The seventh 12-episode season, Natsume's Book of Friends Seven (夏目友人帳 漆, Natsume Yūjin-chō Shichi), aired from October 8 to December 24, 2024; (Note: TV Tokyo listed the air dates for the series on Monday at 24:00, which is effectively Tuesday at midnight.) a special thirteenth episode is set to be included on the fifth DVD/Blu-ray Disc compilation on April 23, 2025. For the seventh season, the opening theme is "Alca" by Hinata Kashiwagi and the ending theme is "Komari Warai" (こまりわらい; lit. 'Troubled Laugh') by Toshiki Kondo.

In North America, the first four seasons were licensed by NIS America and released on home video in Japanese with English subtitles. The seven seasons have been streamed by Crunchyroll. An English dub by Crunchyroll premiered on July 24, 2022.

== Series overview ==
Season	Episodes	Originally released	
Season	Episodes	First released	Last released
1	13	July 8, 2008	September 30, 2008
2	13	January 6, 2009	March 31, 2009
3	13	July 5, 2011	September 27, 2011
4	13	January 3, 2012	March 27, 2012
5	11	October 5, 2016	December 21, 2016
6	11	April 12, 2017	June 21, 2017
7	13	October 8, 2024	April 23, 2025

== Episodes ==
=== Season 1 (2008) ===
No.	Title	Original release date
1	"The Cat and the Book of Friends"; Transliteration: "Neko to Yūjinchō" (Japanese: 猫と友人帳)	July 8, 2008
Natsume discovers the heirloom "Book of Friends" he inherited from his maternal grandmother, Reiko Natsume, contains the names of the yōkai she had defeated and bound to her will. Assisted by a spirit in the form of a Maneki Neko (lucky cat figure), whom he calls Nyanko-sensei ("Master Kitty Cat"), Natsume decides to return all the names to their owners as they deserve to be free, not controlled.
2	"The Dew God's Small Shrine"; Transliteration: "Tsuyukami no Hokora" (Japanese: 露神の祠)	July 15, 2008
Natsume is visited by the village's local god who is currently fading because of the lack of devotees. Learning his name is in the Book of Friends alongside another yōkai, Natsume is determined to return them, but both pages are stuck together due to having grains of rice his grandmother Reiko had eaten decades ago while flipping through her magical book. Natsume later learns to give back the names Dew God and the shadow yōkai simultaneously, and therefore sees flashes of their memories depicting their first and last encounter with Reiko all those decades ago. Suikami later vanishes, having lost all his supporters, as Hana had recently died.
3	"The Mysterious Person at the Eight Fields"; Transliteration: "Yatsuhara no Kaijin" (Japanese: 八ツ原の怪人)	July 22, 2008
Natsume is implored to help spirits who are currently being exorcised. He finds a kindred spirit in Tanuma Kanume, a boy who can sense yōkai although he is not powerful enough to fully perceive or hear them. Natsume is also constantly bothered by two middle-rank yōkai who are fascinated by his immense spiritual powers and he is the Keeper of the Book of Friends, as Reiko's only descendant and grandchild. Natsumi meets a horse yōkai named Mizusu who wants his name returned, but later decides to trust it to Natsume.
4	"Shigure and the Girl"; Transliteration: "Shigure to Shōjo" (Japanese: 時雨と少女)	July 29, 2008
Natsume's secret is found out by Sasada Jun, the class president, during a "test of courage" at an old shrine about to be demolished. She asks for his help to find the ancient spirit who lives in the abandoned school. Natsume denies the fact he can see and hear anything, but she will not take no for an answer. Meanwhile, the spirit, Shigure, captures the rest of their school mates, in fury of the school being torn down. Natsume calms him down by telling him about how Sasada has wanted to meet him for some time, and returns his name to him.
5	"Heart-Colored Ticket"; Transliteration: "Kokoro-iro no Kippu" (Japanese: 心色の切符)	August 5, 2008
Natsume finds an old ticket among his maternal grandmother Reiko's belongings and decides to go to the abandoned train station to see why she kept it. There, he meets a slow-witted spirit named Santo, who was waiting for Reiko the entire time to go to the swamp of Kiriganuma, and there to see and make up with his best friend Mikuri. But the trip is not as easy as it first seems.
6	"The Swallow at the Lake Bottom"; Transliteration: "Kotei no Tsubame" (Japanese: 湖底のつばめ)	August 12, 2008
Natsume is possessed by a swallow spirit, who wishes to meet a human who once helped her. Natsume agrees to help her and the two grow attached. When Swallow finds the human, Natsume feels badly she cannot actually meet him, but when he hears of a yukata that can turn a spirit into a human for a day, he looks for it.
7	"The Little Fox's Hat"; Transliteration: "Kogitsune no Bōshi" (Japanese: 子狐のぼうし)	August 19, 2008
Natsume goes to a hot spring for a school trip, with an errand from Shigeru to pick up teacups from a nearby potter. While there he meets and helps a little fox spirit, who quickly grows attached to him.
8	"Fleeting Light"; Transliteration: "Hakanai Hikari" (Japanese: 儚い光)	August 26, 2008
Natsume meets a spirit who used to be friends with a man who could also see and hear yōkai, but one day lost his ability as he aged. Natsume later attends his wedding.
9	"Ayakashi Exorcism"; Transliteration: "Ayakashi-barai" (Japanese: あやかし祓い)	September 2, 2008
Natsume meets a popular actor named Natori Shuuichi who can also see spirits, and has a side job as an exorcist to destroy or seal them to protect humankind.
10	"Asagi's Koto"; Transliteration: "Asagi no Koto" (Japanese: アサギの琴)	September 9, 2008
Natsume is possessed by a sick koto player whose friend wants her to be able to play one last time.
11	"Nyanko's Book of Boredom"; Transliteration: "Nyanko Tsurezure-chō" (Japanese: ニャンコ徒然帳)	September 16, 2008
When Natsume finally has enough of Nyanko's behavior Nyanko leaves, wandering about by himself and causing trouble.
12	"Five-Day Mark"; Transliteration: "Itsuka-jirushi" (Japanese: 五日印)	September 23, 2008
Natsume is cursed by an evil spirit which had been sealed to a tree. Not wanting to trouble his adoptive family, he decided to stay away from home.
13	"Autumn Banquet"; Transliteration: "Aki no Yaen" (Japanese: 秋の夜宴)	September 30, 2008
Tanuma finds out Nyanko-sensei, whom he calls "Ponto", is a spirit. Tanuma and Natsume enjoy the autumn festival and previous acquaintances are seen again.

=== Season 2 (2009) ===
No. overall	No. in season	Title	Original release date
14	1	"Stolen Book of Friends"; Transliteration: "Ubawareta Yūjinchō" (Japanese: 奪われた友人帳)	January 6, 2009
Natsume is attacked by a yōkai while retrieving a ball at school. In his haste to run away, he ends up breaking a yōkai's seal, similar to how he met Nyanko-sensei. Later that night, Natsume discovers a black lookalike of Nyanko-sensei, only to have him steal the Book of Friends.
15	2	"Melting into Spring"; Transliteration: "Haru ni Tokeru" (Japanese: 春に溶ける)	January 13, 2009
While fooling around in the snow, Natsume and Nyanko-sensei run into Gen, a forest guardian who lives inside a statue. Gen tries to take over Natsume's body, but instead takes over a snow rabbit Natsume had made. Gen pleads with Natsumeto help him find an evil spirit who destroyed Sui, his guardian partner, and Natsumeagrees. But it seems Gen is not telling everything he knows.
16	3	"yōkai Exorcism Amid the Steaming Springs"; Transliteration: "Yōkai Taiji Yukemuri-kō" (Japanese: 妖怪退治 湯けむり行)	January 20, 2009
Natori invites Natsume on a hot spring trip, but noises from the closet and a kimono-clad figure dangled from the ceiling make Natsume uneasy. Natori glimpses Natsume returning the name of a female yōkai, but does not think anything of it. Though far from grateful, the female yōkai attacks Natsume, saying unlike Reiko, who was unrelenting, he is far too kind. They are saved from her wrath when the lord, whose followers Natsume had helped earlier, comes to purify her to return the favor.
17	4	"A Chick Hatches"; Transliteration: "Hina, Kaeru" (Japanese: 雛、孵る)	January 27, 2009
Natsume takes care of an abandoned egg from a nest, without considering it could be a yōkai. After it hatches a rare baby spirit, called Tatsumi, emerged and though Natsume is its parent. Natsume cannot help but get attached to the little spirit even as Tatsumi grows tired and sick. Then, a mysterious spirit came and wants to take away Tatsumi for his master who wants to eat it.
18	5	"Tree of Promise"; Transliteration: "Yakusoku no Ki" (Japanese: 約束の樹)	February 3, 2009
Natsume encounters a young boy spirit, Kirinoe, who had been enslaved by his maternal grandmother by writing his name on a page torn off the Book of Friends, and tying it to a tree in a forest with the claim he could go find it in the next fifty years, lest "the world would come to an end and the seas would go restless" otherwise. Natsume helps to locate the torn page, and find out what Reiko's intention was in tying it to a tree.
19	6	"The Maiden's Circle"; Transliteration: "Shōjo no Jin" (Japanese: 少女の陣)	February 10, 2009
There is a new girl in school, Toru Taki, whom Nishimura immediately becomes smitten with. With her appearance at the school, mysterious circles resembling crop circles begin to appear throughout the town. As Natsume tries to find out more about the circles and Taki, he is visited by another menacing yōkai. Only this time, he is not looking for his name but something more.
20	7	"That Which You Must Not Call"; Transliteration: "Yonde wa Naranu" (Japanese: 呼んではならぬ)	February 17, 2009
Natsume temporarily loses his spiritual abilities after being poisoned by the spirit licking his eyes. With help from Nyanko-sensei, Natsume manages to trap the spirit inside a hand mirror and later has his abilities returned to him in full. Taki thanks him for his aid, and promises to help Natsume however she can.
21	8	"Emotions Undying"; Transliteration: "Fushi no Omoi" (Japanese: 不死の想い)	February 24, 2009
Natsume, Kitamoto and Nishimura take a trip to an old inn to spend some time doing their homework. Surrounding the inn there is a lake; in which is believed to be home to a mermaid. Natsume discovers the mermaid had fought with Reiko and tricked a young girl all to kill time, so Natsume returns her name to her.
22	9	"The Man Amidst the Rows of Cherry Trees"; Transliteration: "Sakura Namiki no Kare" (Japanese: 桜並木の彼)	March 3, 2009
From the day where a picture of a row of cherry trees in a desolate winter was obtained, every time Natsume wakes up, his room is covered in petals. Trying to solve the root of this mystery, Natsume and Nyanko-sensei try to return the picture to Miya, a shadowy figure who accompanies the picture.
23	10	"Temporary Home"; Transliteration: "Kariie" (Japanese: 仮家)	March 10, 2009
Strange things start happening at Natsume's home, like Touko's plants being destroyed, and a yōkai called Karime starts wandering around his house. Natsume learns more about Reiko and her time in the town where she, too, had lived and befriended a young Shigeru. He also learns how to get rid of Karime who's wandering around the house, as it was his maternal grandmother who had defeated him previously via casting an exorcist banishing spell.
24	11	"Assembly of Conjurers"; Transliteration: "Jujutsushi no Kai" (Japanese: 呪術師の会)	March 17, 2009
While out with Touko, Natsume spots a hurt crow yōkai. Quickly he chases after it but as he goes to help it, it is eaten by a much bigger yōkai. Natori and Hiiragi appear right after the yōkai escapes and they invite Natsume to the annual Assembly of the Conjurers. Here, even Natsume cannot distinguish between human and yōkai but is hopeful of finding people who fully understand him, but he is too kindhearted to realize everyone's intention may not be good for the yōkai. He meets Nanase of the Matoba clan who is quite intrigued by him for being the grandchild of Reiko, whom she had always wanted to meet.
25	12	"The Young Boy in the Empty House"; Transliteration: "Haioku no Shōnen" (Japanese: 廃屋の少年)	March 24, 2009
Natsume encounters a young boy named Kai who was sealed in a coffin in an abandoned house. Natsume sets Kai free and finds out Kai is being stalked by a yōkai. After a time, Natsume becomes the target of this yōkai and stops the yōkai's stalking with Nyanko-sensei's help. In the end Natori, who turns out to be the stalker who had sealed Kai in the coffin, tells Natsume Kai is a yōkai who is strong enough pass as a human.
26	13	"Humans and Ayakashi"; Transliteration: "Hito to Ayakashi" (Japanese: 人と妖)	March 31, 2009
Natori tells Natsume of a well near the mansion holds a group of Oni. They are calling out to any yōkai. He also learns Kai came down from the mountains to free the Oni. While looking for Kai, Natsume sets off one of Natori's traps in the mansion. Kai saves Natsume and heads off to kill Natori. Natsume follows him, to save Natori from getting killed. After he encounters him, he is forced to make an important decision; choose between humans or yōkai.

=== Season 3 (2011) ===
No. overall	No. in season	Title	Original release date
27	1	"The Name of a Monster"; Transliteration: "Ayashiki Mono no Na" (Japanese: 妖しきものの名)	July 5, 2011
Natsume meets a shrine god in the form of an elderly woman. He is forced to help her return a mirror to a yōkai said to bring disaster. The yōkai turns out to be Reiko, Natsume's grandmother, who the shrine god only mistook as a yōkai. Reiko had lent out the mirror so the shrine god could save the life of an old tree, but the two parted after a disappointed Reiko learned the elderly woman was a yōkai but not before successfully banishing the spirit from the old tree for her. Natsume returns her name, and the two part ways.
28	2	"Ukihara Village"; Transliteration: "Ukihara no Sato" (Japanese: 浮春の郷)	July 12, 2011
Tanuma's father leaves on a trip and a strange yōkai invades his house, spreading miasma makes all the nearby yōkai suffer. Natsume tracks it down and discovers the noxious yōkai was once a resident in a hidden village for yōkai where the Kagura was held. A portal had opened for a short time during a human ceremony he had taken his younger sister to watch. However, they became trapped in the human world and his sister had shortly died. After returning to the old temple where the ceremonies were held, the portal reopens and he returns home, but not before Natsume returns his name. He declines Kanawa's request to live with him in Ukihara Village, as he says he, unlike Reiko, has found good friends where is now.
29	3	"False Friend"; Transliteration: "Itsuwari no Yūjin" (Japanese: 偽りの友人)	July 19, 2011
It is Shigeru's birthday and Touko asks Natsume to buy some strawberry shortcakes to celebrate. However, Shibata, an old classmate of Natsume 's, finds him and asks for his help. He remembered Natsume used to say weird things, so he wanted to know if a girl he's been seeing is real or not. When Natsume meets the girl, Murasaki, she seems normal. He reassures Shibata she is a human. Natsume later has a dream reveals her to be a tree yōkai with intention to eat Shibata. Natsume tries to warn Shibata, he refuses to listen and accuses Natsume of lying. Natsume tries to talk to Murasaki, but she does not waver. It is then revealed although she had initially planned to eat Shibata, she fell in love with him as they spent time together, and because her tree has been cut down, she will die soon anyway. Shibata receives a note from Murasaki just in time for the two of them to spend her last moments together.
30	4	"Young Days"; Transliteration: "Osanaki Hibi Ni" (Japanese: 幼き日々に)	July 26, 2011
Summer has arrived for Natsume and his friends in the school. After exams, Natsume, Sasada, Nishimura and Kitamoto go on a trip to an art museum. Upon his return, Tohko reminisces about an old friend she felt she had wronged, this makes Natsume think back to his own turbulent childhood. In the present day, a yōkai living in the branches of a tree thinks back to a young Natsume. She had been bored because no one could see or hear her, and when she found out that Natsume could, she often scared him to be noticed. Both of them parted ways on bad terms. The story returns to the teenage Natsume in the present day, who makes a stop at his old neighborhood to visit her. The yōkai, who had isolated herself from humans, is relieved to see Natsume is okay and has found a reason to smile now.
31	5	"The Thing That Lurks In the Storeroom"; Transliteration: "Kura ni Hisomu Mono" (Japanese: 蔵にひそむもの)	August 2, 2011
Natsume and Tanuma take shelter under a roof from the rain. As it turns out, the house belongs to Taki Toru, and they work together to clean her warehouse where her grandfather Shinichiro studied yōkai extensively, desiring to be capable of perceiving them one day. Natsume accidentally breaks a seal that Taki's late grandfather made to trap a dangerous kimono yōkai. The three of them race around the house to find its misplaced limbs before the yōkai does, as its strength will be returned upon completing its body. Natsume and Taki try to get the visiting yōkai to help, but they refuse. When the kimono yōkai comes close to hurting Natsume by siphoning his infinitely high spiritual energies, they come to the rescue. After Taki thanks them, they all reminisce about their fondness for Taki's grandfather and leave elsewhere.
32	6	"That Which Is Not Human"; Transliteration: "Hito Naranu Mono" (Japanese: 人ならぬもの)	August 9, 2011
Natsume accidentally bumps into a woman with blood covering her body. He follows the bloody footsteps the woman left and discovers a small house. When he opens the door, he sees badly injured yōkai. There is someone killing yōkai for their powerful blood, and with the help of Natori, Natsume tracks down who he believes to be the murderer: Matoba Seiji! However, Natsume ends up being abducted by him.
33	7	"Exorcist"; Transliteration: "Haraiya" (Japanese: 祓い屋)	August 16, 2011
Natsume finds out who's been stealing the yōkai blood: The former conjurer of the Matoba clan who recently defected due to her crow yōkai friend having been used as bait some time ago. He investigates with the help of Natori, but is captured by Matoba's shiki. Matoba is willing to sacrifice any number of yōkai for his own ambitions. Matoba then tells Natsume he is gathering demon blood in order to undo a strong seal on a yōkai in the forest. Upon confronting him, Natsume learns there are indeed people who treat yōkai in a very different way than either himself or Natori. Upon leaving, Matoba Seiji learns from his secretary Nanase that Natsume is the grandson of Reiko, which intrigues him greatly.
34	8	"The Little Fox's Watch"; Transliteration: "Kogitsune no Tokei" (Japanese: 子狐のとけい)	August 23, 2011
Natsume is invited to go to a pottery classroom with Shigeru. It is being held in an inn where he once stayed and met the young fox spirit. Natsume is also trying to find a rare spirit herb which can heal Nyanko-sensei's wound he had gotten from the cursed arrow fired by Matoba Seiji. Hearing Natsume is back, the fox spirit is joyous to see him again. He meets a "stone god" who tells him humans and yōkai all have to live in their own world and in their own time. When Natsume returns home, he leaves a plate he made with a painted image of a fox on it as a goodbye present for him.
35	9	"Through the Fading Autumn Wind"; Transliteration: "Akikaze Kitte" (Japanese: 秋風切って)	August 30, 2011
Because of his wound from the cursed arrow fired by Matoba Seiji, Madara spends most of his time sleeping to fully heal. Without Master to protect him, Natsume has to remain constantly on guard. Especially since a strange stone seems to stir strange phenomena everywhere around him. To make things worse, it's the cultural festival and Natsume is appointed to serve the clients at the bazaar set by his class. But the pressure of keeping secrets from his best friends is causing Natsume to gradually break, which the rock yōkai takes advantage of.
36	10	"The Broken Mirror"; Transliteration: "Wareta Kagami" (Japanese: 割れた鏡)	September 6, 2011
An event in the forest causes Tanuma to avoid Natsume the following days, which he becomes concerned about. Mirrors are mysteriously breaking around the school and one day Natsume catches Tanuma acting weirdly. It turns out Tanuma has been possessed by a yōkai looking for her mirror, which had been broken into pieces during a lightning storm a few days before. Using him as a vessel until she reclaims her mirror, Natsume has no choice but to help her. The yōkai female warns there may be others seeking the mirror's great spiritual power.
37	11	"What the Mirror Shows"; Transliteration: "Utsusu Mono" (Japanese: 映すもの)	September 13, 2011
Due to his possession, Tanuma is able to temporarily see the yōkai around him fully and thus better understand how Natsume lives with his power. After the sacred mirror is repaired, thanks to Nyanko-sensei getting the remaining dozens of fragments from yōkai who are in awe of him and his great demonic strength, the white-haired yōkai female finally leaves Tanuma and thanks Natsume for his help in letting her help her own close friend who was in dire need.
38	12	"A Place to Go Home To"; Transliteration: "Kaeru Basho" (Japanese: 帰る場所)	September 20, 2011
When a dangerous and cunning yōkai from Natsume 's lonely past as a preteen finds his current home. He comes down with a fever and dreams about his troubling life right before moving in with the Fujiwaras. It was during his delirium Madara had later destroyed it in one strike, explaining the spiritual seal the preteen Natsume had managed to create many years ago had finally broken due to construction.
39	13	"Natsume's Book of Play"; Transliteration: "Natsume Yūgi-chō" (Japanese: 夏目遊戯帳)	September 27, 2011
Natsume spends time playing human games with his yōkai friends. This game he has not been able to play for being outcast by the other children who had thought him as "creepy and weird" due to his rare spiritual ability to perceive and hear what they never could. Natsume wonders if his grandmother, Reiko, could have been able to make such connections had she not chosen to pick fights and play games with the hundreds of yōkai she had encountered throughout her young adult life.

=== Season 4 (2012) ===
No. overall	No. in season	Title	Original release date
40	1	"Natsume Captured"; Transliteration: "Torawareta Natsume" (Japanese: とらわれた夏目)	January 3, 2012
Natsume encounters six monkey-mask wearing demons while out in a forest of the east of his high school. After his late grandmother's decades-old powerful Book of Friends, and start physically threatening him until Nyanko-sensei arrives and drives them off. Later on, Natsume encounters the six demons again and is captured by them, and brought to their forest. Meanwhile, Madara learns some interesting things about the forest the monkey mask demons live in. Running away from the demons, Natsume and Nyanko-sensei are unintentionally saved by none other than the topmost exorcist Matoba Seji of the infamous Matoba clan. Upon discovering the hidden Matoba mansion in the Eastern Forest, Natsume is imprisoned in a cell without the schoolbag holding his late maternal grandmother's Book of Friends. Madara leaves to retrieve it before Matoba discovers the strong and dangerous powers it possesses of giving its keeper complete and utter control over the hundreds of respective yōkai whose false names are within its pages, as Natsume encounters Matoba Seiji once again who is pleased to see the grandchild of Reiko.
41	2	"The Eastern Forest"; Transliteration: "Touhou no Mori" (Japanese: 東方の森)	January 10, 2012
Natsume and Matoba talk of the latter desiring Natsume to join him, as having the only grandchild and direct descendant of Reiko on his side would surely make the Matoba clan a spiritual force to be reckoned with by yōkai and fellow exorcists alike. When the conversation does not go the way he wants, Matoba orders Natsume to be returned to the prison cells, but manages to escape on Madara who had succeeded in reclaiming the Book of Friends. Along with his other yōkai companions in "the Dog Circle", Natsume helps the six monkey-masked demons living in the forest get their peaceful master, Lord Rokka, back from the nefarious Matoba Seiji's sights. Once released due to Natsume 's arrival earlier, Lord Rokka apologizes for his subjects actions towards Natsume, as he was never after the Book of Friends, and watches as Natsume and the others leave, thus settling the matter. Nanase reminds her young master of how just dangerous and powerful Natsume can become, as even the combined strength of their greatest yōkai servants alone were not capable of hurting him. Matoba Seiji assures her that there are many ways to accomplish things. Back at high school, the monkey yōkai Natsume had helped apologizes for making him act strange in front of his human friends.
42	3	"The Little Ones"; Transliteration: "Chisaki Mono" (Japanese: 小さきもの)	January 17, 2012
Natsume befriends a hurt small fluff-ball yōkai (who he calls Puff Ball) that ends up taking a silver ring with a blue stone belonging to a larger yōkai who plans to burn down Natsume's home if he does not get it back for her. He is aided by his good friend Hinoe and ultimately sees Puff Ball's fellows who disappear in a sparkle of sacred yellow light once being reunited with their lost brethren.
43	4	"The Stand-In"; Transliteration: "Daitou" (Japanese: 代答)	January 24, 2012
Yobiko, a yōkai that can imitate the voices of others, sneaks into Natsume house and asks him to call out another yōkai named Karikami. Long ago, Yobiko had been watching over a woman named Youko who was meeting with a man at a nearby shrine. One day, the man stopped coming due to an arranged marriage to another woman, so Yobiko decided to use his unique talent to talk to the girl. Eventually, he told her the truth about the man's departure and ran away in shame. When he came back to the shrine many years later, he found an old letter that had been sealed shut and wrinkled. Natsume and Yobiko later meet Karikami and after returning his name, Karikami restores the letter. Unable to read human letters, Yobiko asks Natsume to read it to him. Instead of a hateful message he was expecting, it is actually a letter of thanks for telling her the truth.
44	5	"To You, From Bygone Days"; Transliteration: "Sugishi Hi no Kimi ni" (Japanese: 過ぎし日の君に)	January 31, 2012
In another town Natsume used to live in his middle school years, an unnamed brown-haired girl recalls Natsume in the class. She remembers his strange actions and wanted to understand him better. Meanwhile, Natsume encounters a small yōkai which reminds him of her. while crossing, she is almost killed by a truck but is, in fact, saved due to being carried on the back a yōkai, which she is grateful about, even though she could never find her rescuer, but is sure that he has some connection with Natsume and his unusual behavior.
45	6	"The Other Side of the Glass"; Transliteration: "Garasu no Muko" (Japanese: 硝子のむこう)	February 7, 2012
Natsume is trapped in a bottle by a yōkai to be offered to another named Omibashira. Nyanko-sensei transforms into Natsume and goes around his school to ask his friends about Omibashira, but gets Tanuma involved. Tanuma is attacked by one of the yōkai that trapped Natsume and loses him, but as he runs through the forest looking for Natsume he finds a mansion behind the school. When Tanuma is suddenly able to see the yōkai walking up the steps to the mansion, he is found out by a yōkai with a bag over its head.
46	7	"The Gap Between Humans and yōkai" Transliteration: "Hito to no Made" (Japanese: 人と妖の間で)	February 14, 2012
Natsume is saved by Tanuma and the two escape from the banquet hall with the help of Natori, who was disguised as a yōkai. Tanuma is drawn more into the demon/spirit world and experiences its wonders firsthand, which greatly worries Natsume. Blood marks are found all around the mansion and Natsume's fears come true when Tanuma is attacked by Omibashira, but is protected by a sacred stone Natori gave him. After Natsume helps Natori seal Omibashira everyone is able to escape the previously sealed exits. Promising Tanuma that he would tell him his complaints at school the next day, Natsume finally arrives back home.
47	8	"When I Was Deceived"; Transliteration: "Madoi Shi Koro Ni" (Japanese: 惑いし頃に)	February 21, 2012
Nyanko-sensei falls into a well and discovers that there is a strong spiritual barrier inside it, as well as Nanase, Matoba Seiji's assistant. She is looking for a certain jade stone with a strong yōkai she had sealed in it, and tells Nyanko-sensei the story of how she met a humanoid yōkai who also happened to be a powerful exorcist, whom she had initially thought was Reiko, as a young girl to pass the time. Elsewhere, Natsume is requested to help release that very same yōkai from his seal by a friend who had first told young Nanase about Reiko. Natsume returns his false name, Mikage, from the Book of Friends and meets up with Nyanko-sensei who decides not to yet tell him about his time with Nanase.
48	9	"The Moon-Splitting Festival"; Transliteration: "Tsukiwake Matsuri" (Japanese: 月分祭)	February 28, 2012
Natori is tasked with the job of finding and breaking the seal of Houzukigami, a god that was to participate in the Moon-Splitting Festival done every decade against Fuzukigami, another god. The festival is used by the yōkai around the mountains to determine whether the harvest would be bountiful that year or not. Without Houzukigami, the match would end in a default win for Fuzukigami, causing the land to become barren. Natori tries to find the seal but is surprised to find Natsume at the festival disguised as Houzukigami, having been asked by Houzukigami's servants to stand in for their god. The match to be the winner is to catch a beast that was released from a pot. Houzukigami's servants tell Natsume to look for the real Houzukigami while they track down the beast. Joined by Natori, Hiiragi, Nyanko-sensei, and one of the servants, they look in a building by a waterfall. The beast suddenly appears and Natsume and Hiiragi are knocked off the deck of the building. After recuperating from being dragged down the river, they try to run back to the building but are caught in a trap by Fuzukigami's servants which was meant for the beast. While unconscious, one of the servants is able to pick up a human scent from "Houzukigami", making them wonder if it is truly the yōkai god.
49	10	"The God Enshrined"; Transliteration: "Matsurareta Kamisama" (Japanese: 祀られた神様)	March 4, 2012
Natsume is pretending to be the spirit god Houzukigami, so the Moon-Splitting Festival will end in a victory and the mountain will not be ruined. Winning the contest will not be easy, but with help from Natori he will surely find a way to find a compromise.
50	11	"A Single Photo"; Transliteration: "Ichi Mai no Shashin" (Japanese: 一枚の写真)	March 13, 2012
Natsume looks back at a photo of his late parents (his late father and Reiko's illegitimate daughter) and old wounds are reopened. Natsume is having a fun day with his human friends, but all of a sudden he gets a phone call. The house Natsume used to live in as a child until his father's unspecified death will be sold. He makes the decision to go see it one last time, as he remembers how lots of yōkai plagued that neighborhood.
51	12	"The Door of Memories"; Transliteration: "Kioku no Tobira" (Japanese: 記憶の扉)	March 20, 2012
Natsume, accompanied by Nyanko-sensei, set out to visit his childhood home. He visits a relative to pick up the key to the house, but is being followed by a bug-like yōkai who wants him to draw a mouth for it. He leads him away from the home of his paternal relatives and Nyanko-sensei drives it away. When the two get back on track to finding the house, Natsume is suddenly attacked by the yōkai and becomes lost in painful memories of his lonely and troubled childhood of being the only human who could fully perceive and hear such demonic/spiritual beings.
52	13	"The Long Way Home"; Transliteration: "Tooki Ieji" (Japanese: 遠き家路)	March 27, 2012
Natsume, possessed by the yōkai, thinks of a painful incident from his childhood involving the family he was living with at the time. The yōkai offers to eat all of his childhood memories, so that he will no longer have to relive his pain. Natsume assures that they are still an essential part of him. This causes his spiritual power to become strong enough to effectively drive the yōkai out all on his own. Madara expels its great spiritual energies and it becomes a harmless bug again. Natsume thanks him for driving off the yōkai, to which Madara merely claims that he is only interested in attaining the Book of Friends from him upon his sudden untimely demise and nothing more.

=== Season 5 (2016) ===
No. overall	No. in season	Title	Original release date
53	1	"Unchanging Form"; Transliteration: "Kawaranu Sugata" (Japanese: 変わらぬ姿)	October 5, 2016
A yōkai in a pot named Kaystubuo wants Natsume to find her lost doll, claiming his grandmother had stolen it. When he finds it, she does not recognize it because it has been outside for years. Natsume cleans the doll and makes it a new kimono, and Kayastubo finally recognizes it in its new clothes. Natsume also encounters a large acorn-loving yōkai whose false name he comes to return but not before giving him manji, which Reiko herself had given him in place of acorns.
54	2	"Mischievous Rain"; Transliteration: "Itazura na Ame" (Japanese: 悪戯な雨)	October 12, 2016
Natsume finds a towel in the forest during a walk in the rain, and encounters a female yōkai who demands it back. The yōkai follows Natsume to his home and manages to get Natsume to help her find the "handsome man" who gave it to her half a century ago at a bus stop. She wants to return the towel the man gave her after he was concerned seeing her play in the rain. The female yōkai child smells the man's strong human scent in his granddaughter, who tells Natsume her grandfather is in the hospital due an illness. Natsume comes to see him, who presents Natsume with a brand-new pink towel for "the little girl" he had seen in his youth. Happy to receive a towel of her very own, the humanoid yōkai girl thanks Natsume and leaves for her home.
55	3	"The Letter From the Exorcist"; Transliteration: "Haraiya kara no Tegami" (Japanese: 祓い屋からの手紙)	October 19, 2016
Natsume finds a letter addressed to him from Matoba Seiji, which worries and intrigues him. Walking in the forest, he loses it when an amateur exorcist seals a yōkai in a pot. Noticing the very weak seal, Natsume and Nyanko-sensei take it to Natori's condo to seal it properly. while there, Natsume is informed, unbeknownst to Natori, the Book of Friends is a forbidden contract, which worries him because his grandmother, Reiko, had dabbled in the forbidden spiritual arts. When Natsume returns home, he sees Matoba and learns the letter was a request for Natsume to attend another meeting to drive out the person who has been targeting fellow exorcists possessed by a yōkai. Matoba threatens to expose his secret to the Fujiwaras, which makes Natsume even more afraid and distrustful of him but reluctantly accepts.
56	4	"Shadow of Linked Chains"; Transliteration: "Rensa no Kage" (Japanese: 連鎖の陰)	October 26, 2016
Matoba brings Natsume to one of the Matoba clan's villas to attend the exorcist meeting. Natsume learns a mask yōkai called "Magatsumen" is controlling people and disguises himself as a shiki in order to test attendees if they have been possessed. By following a strange sound, Natsume finds the culprit behind the Magatsumen possessions and drives said yōkai out. Having found them out, Matoba shoots the Magatsumen with a cursed arrow to exorcise it. Natsume and Madara leave, with Matoba wondering as to how Natsume was able to make a contract with such a mighty daiyōkai as such a connection enables one to maintain and possess even greater spiritual powers. Natsume firmly assures him he does not have a contract but had made a promise to Madara, which he intends to keep.
57	5	"It Must Not Be Bound"; Transliteration: "Musunde wa Ikenai" (Japanese: 結んではいけない)	November 2, 2016
Natsume sees strange writing on the chalk board in the Earth Science classroom. Taki tells Natsume of the hairy yōkai she helped leave her home. Natsume comes to Taki's home and learns three yōkai had been trapped there -- two rabbit yōkaiwho are best friends, and a hairy white one. The hairy yōkai is enchanted by Taki's kindness and helps find the rabbit yōkai in Taki's home. Natsume learns the hairy yōkai was the one who wrote on the school chalkboard and goes back to read the yōkai's feelings on it. Earlier, he informs Taki the crop-like circle her late grandfather had made is a forbidden technique in the world of exorcists, priests and priestesses.
58	6	"Soundless Valley"; Transliteration: "Oto Nashi no Tani" (Japanese: 音無しの谷)	November 9, 2016
Natsume is chased by two hairy yōkai who cast a voice-sealing spell on him to ensure he will never be able to call upon his "servants'" for help with the Book of Friends. A large bird yōkai saves him, mistaking him for his grandmother Reiko, and brings him to a once lively valley before Nyanko-sensei finds him. Natsume regains his voice after the group of yōkai attack him in his room, and he returns the pink-yellow bird yōkai's name, Hidaka, who leaves on a journey elsewhere.
59	7	"Distant Festival Lights"; Transliteration: "Tōi Matsuri Hi" (Japanese: 遠い祭り火)	November 23, 2016
Tanuma invites his friends to an inn run by his relatives. While sweeping outside, Tanuma is greeted by an old woman named Ito. Natsume learns Ito is a yōkai serving the Mizunagi shrine by protecting the mountain festival. Ito has come into the inn because another yōkai has stolen the festival's white mask and has disguised itself as an inn guest. Natsume finds the yōkai who stole the mask for the festival's spiritual power, and Ito exorcises her. Ito warns Natsume to keep her identity a secret until after the festival is over so she can complete the festival. Natsume assures her that he will tell no one she is a yōkai so she can stay in the town as long as she wishes.
60	8	"A World Unbent"; Transliteration: "Yugami naki Sekai" (Japanese: 歪みなき世界)	November 30, 2016
An episode is a story about a teenage Natori Shuuichi and Matoba Seiji when they first met some years ago. This special episode shows Suuichi's family had disdain for being the only one who could fully perceive and hear yōkai. He finds a mentor in the middle-aged exorcist Takuma Yousuke, who warns him to be wary of the Matoba clan. Wanting to learn more, teenage Natori continues training himself to further hone and greatly enhance his innate spiritual prowess into taking down the dangerous yōkai as his one true mission in life. Regardless, he is assisted by the teenage Matoba Seiji, whose innate spiritual powers are supremely stronger than Natori Suuichi's ever will be.
61	9	"Following A Narrow Path"; Transliteration: "Kewashiki wo Yuku" (Japanese: 険しきをゆく)	December 7, 2016
The episode starts with Natsume being chased by a hairy yōkai. He comes across a tiny mushroom yōkai who tells him about a noble yōkai named Lord Shuon who was on a journey. Natsume helps the little yōkai prepare for his meeting with the noble yōkai. When they meet, however, the noble yōkai warns the mushroom yōkai the path he takes is a narrow one, and asks the little mushroom-like yōkai to go back home. But then the little yōkai realizes he need to become worthy in order to follow him. Another yōkai, who appears to be one of the noble followers of the divine daiyōkai Lord Shouon, appears and gives a book to the mushroom yōkai and tells him to complete the training to join Lord Shoun.
62	10	"Touko and Shigeru"; Transliteration: "Tōko to Shigeru" (Japanese: 塔子と滋)	December 14, 2016
The episode shows the story of Touko and Shigeru Fujiwara adopting Natsume several years ago when he was still unaware of his mysterious maternal grandmother Reiko's spiritual powers, and the Book of Friends he came to inherit from her. As a preteen, Natsume had been living with some of his late father's cousins who wanted to get rid of him because of overly erratic behavior regarding yōkai came to consistently bother him even then.
63	11	"To the Ephemeral Ones"; Transliteration: "Hakanaki Mono e" (Japanese: 儚き者へ)	December 21, 2016
The mid-ranks show Natsume flowers at the top of a hill. Natsume later catches a cold and the mid-ranks go and get medicine for him, doing difficult chores for the yōkai with the medicine. Amid Natsume's fever dreams are the memory of when he got sick as a child and he briefly talks to his teenage maternal grandmother Reiko who told him if he is alone, then he does not need to protect anyone. With the medicine in hand, the mid-ranks give it to him and his fever goes down. They later learn the medicine does not work on humans and are disheartened as they wasted their time, but smile when Natsume thanks them for their efforts.

=== Season 6 (2017) ===
No. overall	No. in season	Title	Original release date
64	1	"The Days Eater"; Transliteration: "Tsukihigui" (Japanese: つきひぐい)	April 12, 2017
A yōkai known as "the Days Eater" turns Natsume back to a young boy without his memories of Nyanko-sensei, who has to enlist the aid of Tanuma and Taki. They manage to invite young curious Natsume into Tanuma's home, so they can get watch over him until they find a solution. However, yōkai come to try to persuade him to going with them.
65	2	"It Blooms Tomorrow"; Transliteration: "Ashita Saku" (Japanese: 明日咲く)	April 19, 2017
Natsume helps a renowned Rockwasher look for his apprentice who has stopped writing to him with the help of Hinoe and the two middle-ranked yōkai, as the missing Rockwasher, Azuma, reminds Natsume of himself when he came to the Fujiwaras several months prior. Nyanko-sensei informs Natsume that, even if they find Azuma, he may have been defiled due to having been sealed away by an exorcist; thus depriving him of containing to be a full-fledged Rockwasher. Remembering the flowers on the rocks he had seen at the river earlier in the day, Natsume takes the Rockwasher, where he finally reunites with Azuma. Azuma is ashamed of being deprived of his duty, but is comforted by his overjoyed master. The two then leave elsewhere to go on a journey to find an even better place.
66	3	"Nitai-sama" (Japanese: 二体さま)	April 26, 2017
Natsume's elementary school classmate Shibata (who debuted in "False Friend") suddenly calls. Natsume reluctantly visits Shibata together with Tanuma, during which Shibata tells them about the legendary "Doll Mansion" of Shoigi who Natsume discovers is harboring a yōkai who has animated the dolls with vile spiritual energy. With Tamuna's limited spiritual knowledge and strength, he manages to best the yōkai and stop the mansion from being haunted.: Chronologically, this takes place some time after the events of the season six finale "What Matters."
67	4	"Lying Eyes"; Transliteration: "Chigaeru Hitomi" (Japanese: 違える瞳)	May 3, 2017
Natsume meets Tsukiko, the teenage daughter of former exorcist named Takuma Yousuke (Natori's mentor from "A World Unbent") who has recently lost his spiritual ability to see and hear yōkai and thus retired as an exorcist. Because she did not inherit any of her father's spiritual powers, she asked Natori to check around the house because she feels something is wrong and a spirit may be out to hurt her father. Natsume is attacked by an old woman who is, in fact, an old woman-looking yōkai who recognizes him as Keeper of the Book of Friends, which Natori pretends not to have heard.
68	5	"The Bound Ones"; Transliteration: "Shibarareshi Mono" (Japanese: 縛られしもの)	May 10, 2017
Natsume and Natori discover that two of the three servants of Takuma Yusuke have been trying to bring misfortune into the house. As Natsume goes home, Natori asks his dutiful shiki Urhime to discover just what powerful and dangerous artifact that Natsume possesses, as he thinks it may be something that Natsume should not have due to his good heart and recklessness of getting more and more involved in dangerous situations.
69	6	"Nishimura and Kitamoto"; Transliteration: "Nishimura to Kitamoto" (Japanese: 西村と北本)	May 17, 2017
The episode shows how Natsume first befriended Nishimura Satoru and Kitamoto Atsuhi several months ago, along with a better look at their family lives and point of view; such as Nishmura's elder brother and Kitamoto's younger sister Mana.
70	7	"Gomochi's Benefactor"; Transliteration: "Gomochi No Onjin" (Japanese: ゴモチの恩人)	May 24, 2017
Natsume is surprised when a forest yōkai called Gomochi comes to seek Reiko in gratitude for helping him out decades ago. Gomochi and his bride-to-be received their freedom from her, and now they about to be wed after deciding to no longer wait for Reiko to return to visit them. They invite Natsume to the wedding in place of his late maternal grandmother, which the bride is overjoyed about.
71	8	"A Day That Will Someday Come"; Transliteration: "Itsuka Kuru Hi" (Japanese: いつかくる日)	May 31, 2017
Natsume talks to a dark-haired teenage boy at the station, who turns out to be a crow yōkai that left a human because of their feelings for one another. The boy wants to find her because he received a wedding invitation from her.
72	9	"What Flows"; Transliteration: "Nagare Yuku Ha" (Japanese: ながれゆくは)	June 7, 2017
After a flood occurs on Four Mask Hill during Natsume's summer school session, a hidden fourth mask randomly appearing in the school worries Natsume. He learns that is a dutiful follower of a mountain goddess whom sees drifting in a boat as if looking for something precious. Naynko-Sensei manages to get Natsume to appease the mountain goddess' remaining mask-shaped follower and have the earth deity return to her mountain home.
73	10	"The Sealed Room"; Transliteration: "Tozasareta Heya" (Japanese: 閉ざされた部屋)	June 14, 2017
A competition is opened to search for a famous researcher's sealed room who recently died. The prize are his research books on powerful exorcists' powerful spells and mystical talismans, and many exorcists are gathered in the hope of becoming famous for acquiring even greater spiritual power and further knowledge on how to deal with yōkai more effectively. Natori is naturally invited, and Natsume wants to help as this might mean finding something that might let him find further information about the Book of Friends or even his maternal grandmother Reiko herself. Natori runs into Matoba Nanase who, naturally, is hoping to find the sealed study and give all of the ancient and dangerously powerful research it contains to the Matoba clan to increase their sinister influence over all yōkai and other exorcist adversaries. Natori warns Natsume of Nanase, and has him don a horned Noh mask to avoid her recognizing him again. Natsume is surprised at how similar the late Hadozaki was to Reiko; both having endured great loneliness and solitude over the course of their lives. Suddenly, Natsume is attacked by a yōkai who recognizes him as Reiko's grandchild instantly and demands that he hand over the Book of Friends. Natori appears to exorcise him with his shikigami and seems to have heard everything.
74	11	"What Matters"; Transliteration: "Taisetsu Na Mono" (Japanese: 大切なモノ)	June 21, 2017
Natsume decides to tell Natori about his secret when the search for the sealed room in the Hadazaki mansion is over. Natsume manages to recover some sacred sutras containing strong exorcist spells and talismans as the mansion "burns" from the sacred blue fire made by the dragon shiki who informs Natsume that he once met a man who he resembles as opposed to Reiko; this piques Natsume's curiosity. After hearing about Reiko and her Book of Friends from Natsume, Natori believes that such a powerful and dangerous artifact would be better off destroyed, which Natsume does not hear. Back home, Natsume cannot help wondering if the blue dragon was referring to his maternal grandfather. During lunch, he tells Tanuma and Taki about his latest escapade as Nyanko-sensei drinks sake with Hinoe, Chobi, Mizusu and the middle-ranking yōkai on the roof. The Book of Friends is left on Natsume's desk in his room.: Chronologically, this is followed by "Nitai-sama" and the OVA episode "Fragments of Dreams."

=== Season 7 (2024) ===
No. overall	No. in season	Title	Original release date
75	1	"The Fragment's Lament"; Transliteration: "Hahen wa Shūu" (Japanese: 破片は 愁う)	October 8, 2024
After receiving ash from a sacred cherry tree, a gift from a yōkai whose name he returned, Natsume uses it to mold pottery clay into a figurine named Master Kitty-Cat. This vessel is subsequently inhabited by the spirit of a yōkai that was formerly enshrined as a large white bird Buddha statue in a priest's home. The spirit, who communicates mentally with translation provided by Nyanko-sensei, requests a teacup for easier travel and asks to borrow the clay form until it can return to its original body. The situation becomes complicated as the clay vessel begins to deteriorate and is pursued by other yōkai who find its appearance frightening. The spirit successfully drives away its pursuers and thanks Natsume for his assistance. It is later revealed that the original Buddha statue was broken when children accidentally threw a baseball through the priest's window. The priest thanks the children for their honesty, philosophically noting that it was simply the statue's "time".
76	2	"Someday's Garden"; Transliteration: "Itsuka no Niwa" (Japanese: いつかの庭)	October 15, 2024
Natsume constructs a flowerbed for Touko and Shigeru, only to find it destroyed each night. He and Nyanko-sensei discover the culprits are five yōkai who compel Natsume to restore their treasured box garden, a miniature mansion, while they await the return of their revered yōkai goddess, Princess Shida. Despite his limited dexterity, Natsume successfully cleans the tiny estate. He and Nyanko-sensei are then shrunk to attend a celebratory banquet with the returned Princess Shida and her overjoyed retainers. Afterwards, a single sakura petal remains in Natsume's hair, which Touko later notices and admires for its beauty, wondering at its origin.
77	3	"Ten Complete Nights"; Transliteration: "Tookanya" (Japanese: とおかんや)	October 22, 2024
Following a dream, Natsume investigates a mansion attracting ten scarecrow yōkai. He meets the exorcist Natori, who introduces a reclusive former member of the renowned Yorishima exorcist clan. Yorishima explains the "Tookayna" is a ten-night game between these scarecrows and an exorcist; if the exorcist drives them out, the scarecrows relinquish the house. Natori and Natsume aid the current resident, who has endured nine nights of nightmares as the scarecrows attempt to claim his home. After erecting barriers that trap or banish all but one scarecrow, the man apologizes to the remaining yōkai, explaining the home's profound importance to him despite his family being gone. He requests that Natori help the scarecrows, who are said to bring good luck. As they depart, Natori vows to find a way to release Natsume from the burden of his grandmother's forbidden supernatural book.
78	4	"Depths of the Page"; Transliteration: "Pēji no Oku" (Japanese: 頁の奥)	October 29, 2024
Natsume accompanies Kitamoto to a bookstore to acquire a specific book, but senses a yōkai presence and convinces his friend to leave. He and Nyanko-sensei later follow Kitamoto back, where the brown-haired shopkeeper, Kaeda, is revealed to be a yōkai from an ancient text who protects the store for its elderly owner. She explains that Dei, a sealed yōkai, has escaped and placed cursed paper spells in various books. While Natsume suffers a minor tongue curse, Kitamoto's arm is afflicted, causing fatigue. Natsume eventually subdues Dei, and Kaeda reseals him, an act whose powerful spiritual energy causes Natsume to faint. The next day, Kaeda informs Natsume she must return to her book to regain strength. When Natsume tells Kitamoto his acquaintance has "moved away", Kitamoto shows him the book he gave Kaeda, noting the bookmark has moved, revealing she read it despite her claims of disinterest.
79	5	"Chobi's Treasure"; Transliteration: "Chobi no Takaramono" (Japanese: ちょびの宝物)	November 5, 2024
Natsume observes a wingless white dragon yōkai flying overhead, shedding its luminous scales across the countryside. He later finds the yōkai Chobihigue despondent over his broken shell comb. Resolving to help, Natsume decides to procure one of the dragon's scales to be fashioned into a new comb. Although "The Dog Circle" assists, the dragon does not reappear initially. Days later, Natsume and Nyanko-sensei locate a scale lodged in a pine tree. When Natsume presents it, Chobihigue accepts it and transforms, revealing himself to be the white dragon. He expresses his deep gratitude, vowing to treasure the new comb made from his own scale even more than the original.
80	6	"The Abandoned Station, Two Wheels"; Transliteration: "Haieki Futatsu no Wa" (Japanese: 廃駅・ふたつの輪)	November 12, 2024
Natsume and Nyanko-sensei take shelter from the rain at an old bus stop, where they encounter Matoba Seiji, the leader of a prominent exorcist clan. Matoba explains he is evading a yokai that hunts exorcists during storms and proves his claim when a large yōkai passes by without noticing them under the cover of his birdcage. The next day, Natsume visits the Hakozaki mansion to assist Beniko with a strange presence she feels. He inquires if her family's records mention his grandfather, but she has no information. Outside, Natsume finds mirror fragments near a tree and meets Matoba again. Matoba reveals the fragments are part of a barrier to ward off a specific yōkai that seeks his right eye monthly, a consequence of an ancestral broken promise. When the yōkai attacks, Natsume uses a fragment to channel energy from a hidden katana, disabling a doll yōkai created through forbidden magic. Matoba then tricks the dimwitted pursuer into devouring the doll, resolving both threats. After the Matobas depart, Natsume gains a new perspective on the recurring burdens they face.
81	7	"A Difficult Two"; Transliteration: "Nigatena Futari" (Japanese: 苦手なふたり)	November 19, 2024
Natsume meets Taki's older brother, Isamu, a skeptic attempting to disprove the existence of yōkai. While visiting the Taki home, Natsume perceives a yōkai attached to Isamu but refrains from telling him. He and Nyanko-sensei assist the siblings in searching for the lock that matches an old key Isamu has retrieved, with Nyanko-sensei warding off other opportunistic yōkai. In the "Phoenix" room, Isamu remembers the key's significance and unlocks a hidden box containing three rocks painted with flowers. He explains that he and his yōkai-obsessed grandfather, Taki Shinichio, collected them as a gift for his younger sister upon her birth, deeply moving her. With this memory restored, the yōkai departs from Isamu, its purpose fulfilled as it could now return to its shrine near his college.
82	8	"Natsume on the Moonlit Night"; Transliteration: "Tsukiyo no Natsume" (Japanese: 月夜の夏目)	November 26, 2024
A shapeshifting yōkai impersonates Natsume, wanting its finger back from Nishimura Satoru. Natsume and Nyanko-sensei keep taps on the doll yōkai who shows Nishimura an abandoned house, in which Natsume apologizes for involving his best friend in something strange. As they walk home, Natsume wonders what the song the doll was singing, which Nyanko-sensei also does not know.
83	9	"That Which Blocks the Ceremony"; Transliteration: "Gishiki o Habamu Mono" (Japanese: 儀式を阻む者)	December 3, 2024
Natsume and Natori investigate an abandoned home of the extinct Miharu exorcist clan, which is being watched over by the Matoba clan in their stead. One of three yōkai called "the Three Pillars" visit for a few decades and leave. Some of the yōkai are doing whatever they can to disrupt the ceremony. Matoba and Natori end up being locked in a room as the air becomes harder to breathe, and Natsume meets a yōkai who had cut down the cloth earlier. She informs Natsume that she desires the annihilation of the Miharu family, and pushes him and Nyanko-sensei down a trapdoor they had opened.
84	10	"The House Where a Promise Remains"; Transliteration: "Yakusoku no Nokoru ie" (Japanese: 約束の残る家)	December 10, 2024
Natsume and Nyanko-sensei investigate a female, ball-holding yōkai who desires the extinction of the Miharu exorcist clan, unaware it has already died out. Meanwhile, Matoba and Natori escape a locked room, with Natori using a paper-based spell to break the enchantment. While Matoba resumes the Three Pillars ceremony, Natori finds Natsume, who explains the yōkai's motive: to fulfill a wish for Miharu Masakiyo, the exorcist who once saved her on a whim. Despite the interrupted ceremony and warnings that her debt cannot be repaid, she remains determined. Natsume prevents her from entering Natori's exorcism circle, and his compassion ultimately reaches her, prompting her peaceful departure. After the ordeal, Natsume offers a loquat to Matoba, who accepts it before leaving with his clan.
85	11	"Tell Me Your Name"; Transliteration: "Anata no Namae O Oshietekudasai" (Japanese: 名前を教えて)	December 17, 2024
Natsume meets Soranome, the mind reading-yōkai who was the very first name Reiko had collected in her Book of Friends. To pass the time, he tells Natsume of how a sickly human middle schoolgirl named Sōko Morinaga had challenged Reiko to a series of games in return for knowing her name. This is what inspired the latter to do the same with all of the yōkai she had encountered from then on until her premature death underneath a tree during one of her everyday naps. Natsume returns Soranome's name, and he and Nyanko-sensei head home. Natsume tells Nyanko-sensei about a dream where he saw a field of blue flowers that was special to his grandmother, who wanted to see with Sōko, but could not due to her premature death.
86	12	"From the Path of Dreams"; Transliteration: "Yume no Michi Kara" (Japanese: 夢路より)	December 24, 2024
The Dog Circle pays Natsume another visit as he makes an origami, which is the companion of another yōkai whose name Natsume returned a few days earlier. In gratitude for safeguarding her, the yōkai in the origami shows Natsume and Nyanko-sensei the natural places she had seen on her travels. Natsume, in turn, shows her around town with Nyanko-sensei translating her words for her. Later, she thanks them for their aid and leaves with her companion, but not before drawing flowers around his bedroom as a token of gratitude.
87	13	"The Outstretched Hand"; Transliteration: "Nobashita Te wa" (Japanese: 伸ばした手は)	April 23, 2025 (home video)
In a flashback episode about Shuuichi Natori's late teenage years as a self-taught exorcist, he meets Urihime and made his personal shiki, as he did not want to free her from her loneliness by exorcising her, as she had wished.

=== OAD and OVA LaLa Specials (2013–17) ===
Title	Original release date
"Nyanko-sensei & the First Errand" Transliteration: "Nyanko-sensei to Hajimete no Otsukai" (Japanese: ニャンコ先生とはじめてのおつかい)	December 15, 2013
Nyanko-sensei wanders off from Natsume during a walk, and with the help of some of his fellow yōkai, leads a pair of wandering children to the place they are searching for which they call, "Mitsumonster" with Hinoe showing off her fortune-telling ability to amuse them.
"Someday, When the Snow Falls" Transliteration: "Itsuka Yuki no Hi Ni" (Japanese: いつかゆきのひに)	February 1, 2014
During a winter walk, Natsume meets a snowwoman yōkai who is searching for something she lost but cannot seem to recall and decides to help her, despite not knowing what exactly she was looking for.
"One-Night's Cup" Transliteration: "Hitoyosakazuki" (Japanese: 一夜盃)	March 22, 2017
Natsume meets a yōkai couple whom his grandmother had met and who specialize in making sake cups, particularly sake cups that add glorious tastes to whoever is drunk from them but then turn to dust after one night.
"Banquet of Play" Transliteration: "Yuugi no Utage" (Japanese: 遊戯の宴)	April 26, 2017
Natsume gets involved with a yōkai that is the host of an old house, in which other yōkai play hide-and-seek. Unable to escape, he needs to find the host so the host will let him leave the game.
"The Stump of the Suzunaru Tree" Transliteration: "Suzunaru no Kirikabu" (Japanese: 鈴鳴るの切り株)	September 27, 2017
Natsume encounters an old man who asks for help with getting home. The old man turns out to be a yōkai who will soon disappear and he asks Natsume to help him to fulfill a promise that he had made.
"A Fragment of Fantasy" Transliteration: "Mugen no Kakera" (Japanese: 夢幻のかけら)	October 25, 2017
A middle school girl ventures into the woods to return a ring to a white owl she helped, following the instructions he gave her in a dream. There she meets a strange boy (Natsume) and his talking lucky cat (Nyanko-sensei) who help her to find the white owl. Natsume returns his name, Hidaki, to him, and the yōkai who took on the form of said owl wipes the girl's memory of their encounter. She awakens to find herself on a bench, but cannot remember how she had ended up there. She wonders where the pretty blue stone came from, which is a fragment of the ring per Hidaki's gratitude for her kindness.
