= Ashika Sakura =

Japanese manga artist

Ashika Sakura (さくら あしか, Sakura Ashika) is a Japanese manga artist. She is also known in the manga community under the name Sakurako Gokurakuin (極楽院櫻子, Gokurakuin Sakurako), under which she is the writer and artist of Juvenile Orion and Sekirei. Ashika Sakura has done numerous manga under the yaoi and shotacon genre, including Sensitive Pornograph.

== Works ==
- Anatadake Ga Suki (You are My One and Only)
- Category: Freaks
- Kusuriyubi ni Himitsu no Koi (Secret Love on the Ringfinger)
- Adult na Kaihatsushitsu (The Exploration of Adulthood)
- Anoko to Boku to Anohito to (Honey Baby, Me, and the Other)
- Bucchouzura ni Koi wo Shite (Love is made with a Sullen Look)
- Himitsu no Kemonotachi (The Secret Beasts)
- Nemureru Kimi no Barairo no Kuchibiru (Your Rose-Colored Lips Can Sleep)
- Tenshi no Hâtorizumu (The Heart-Rhythm of Angels)
- Sensitive Pornograph
- Worlds End Garden
- Koiiro Kougyoku
- Pretty Standard
- Biroudo no Tensoku (The Velvet Footbindings)
- Adult na Kaihatsushitsu (The Exploration of Adulthood)
- Sekirei
- Night Walkers
- Tokyo Renaikitan
- Sekai no Owari ga Furu Yoru ni
- Boku no Suki na Sensei (The Teacher I Love)
- Returners ~Kigensha~
