= Sekirei =

Japanese manga series

- First volume cover, featuring Musubi

セキレイ
- Genre: Harem; Romantic comedy; Supernatural
- Manga
- Written by: Sakurako Gokurakuin
- Published by: Square Enix
- English publisher: NA: Yen Press
- Magazine: Young Gangan
- Original run: December 3, 2004 – March 16, 2018
- Volumes: 19
- Anime television series
- Directed by: Keizō Kusakawa
- Produced by: Hiroyuki Shimizu; Kozue Kaneniwa
- Written by: Takao Yoshioka
- Music by: Hiroaki Sano
- Studio: Seven Arcs
- Licensed by: NA: Aniplex of America; UK: Crunchyroll UK and Ireland
- Original network: Chiba TV, KBS Kyoto, Nagoya Broadcasting Network, Sun TV, Tokyo MX, TV Hokkaido, TV Kanagawa, TV Saitama, AT-X, TVQ
- English network: US: Funimation Channel
- Original run: July 2, 2008 – September 17, 2008
- Episodes: 12 + OVA
- Anime television series

Sekirei: Pure Engagement
- Directed by: Keizō Kusakawa
- Produced by: Kozue Kaneniwa; Shunsuke Saitō
- Written by: Takao Yoshioka
- Music by: Hiroaki Sano
- Studio: Seven Arcs
- Licensed by: NA: Aniplex of America; UK: Crunchyroll UK and Ireland
- Original network: AT-X, KBS Kyoto, Nagoya Broadcasting Network, Sun TV, Tokyo MX, TV Hokkaido, TVQ Kyushu Broadcasting
- English network: US: Funimation Channel
- Original run: July 4, 2010 – September 26, 2010
- Episodes: 13 + OVA

Sekirei (セキレイ; lit. 'Wagtail') is a Japanese manga series by Sakurako Gokurakuin. The manga was serialized in Square Enix's seinen manga magazine Young Gangan between December 2004 and August 2015. A special epilogue volume to the manga was serialized in the same magazine from May 2017 to March 2018. An anime adaptation produced by Seven Arcs and directed by Keizō Kusakawa aired in Japan between July and September 2008, and a second season aired between July and September 2010. Both seasons were licensed in North America by Funimation, until their license expired in 2017. The central character of the series is Minato Sahashi, a ronin who has failed his college entrance examinations two years in a row. His life changes, however, when he meets several women with special powers called "Sekirei" and is dragged into a battle to possibly decide the fate of the world.

== Plot ==
In Tokyo, known as Shinto Teito (新東帝都, Shintō Teito; "New Eastern Imperial Capital"), in 2020, 19-year-old Minato Sahashi is extremely intelligent, yet due to his major lack of self-confidence has failed the college entrance exam twice.

The same day of his second failure, Minato meets a girl named Musubi, who literally falls out of the sky on top of him. Minato soon learns that she is a member of an extraterrestrial race known as the "Sekirei", and she chooses him as her "Ashikabi", one of the mysterious set of humans that have the genetic trait and can make a contract by kissing the Sekirei; this binds the Sekirei to the Ashikabi and allows them to use their full power in elimination battles with other Sekirei. Made up of 108 cute girls, attractive buxom women and bishōnen, the Sekirei battle in a competition known as the "Sekirei Plan" organized by Hiroto Minaka, the chairman and founder of the mysterious and powerful MBI Corporation.

Minato quickly learns that being the partner of a Sekirei is not all fun and games, especially when five other Sekirei choose him as their Ashikabi, each also forming a contract/bond with him. Now Minato must find a way to survive both the life-threatening battles of the Sekirei Plan and his partners' fierce competition for him.

== Media ==
=== Manga ===
Written and illustrated by Sakurako Gokurakuin, Sekirei was serialized in Square Enix's seinen manga manga magazine Young Gangan between December 3, 2004, and August 21, 2015. Square Enix published 18 tankōbon volumes between June 25, 2005, and October 24, 2015. A sequel to the manga, titled Sekirei: 365 Days Without Her (セキレイ 彼女のいない365日のこと, Sekirei: Kanojo no Inai 365-nichi no Koto) began serialization in Young Gangan on May 2, 2017, and finished on March 16, 2018. Its chapters were collected in a single volume (numbered 19th) on April 25, 2018.

Yen Press licensed the series in North America and released the volumes digitally (including 365 Days Without Her) from November 24, 2015, to November 27, 2018. The publisher later released the volumes in ten 2-in-1 omnibus volumes from July 18, 2017, to November 12, 2019.

=== Drama CD ===
A drama CD entitled Sekirei Original Drama CD was released on July 25, 2007, by Frontier Works.

=== Anime ===
The first 12-episode anime series adaptation produced by the animation studio Seven Arcs and directed by Keizō Kusakawa aired in Japan between July 2 and September 17, 2008. The anime is licensed by Aniplex in Japan. The first season is mostly faithful to the overall story structure of the manga series, covering roughly the first fifty-one chapters of the series. The opening theme is "Sekirei" (セキレイ) and the main ending theme is "Dear sweet heart"; both songs are performed by Saori Hayami (#88 Musubi), Marina Inoue (#9 Tsukiumi), Kana Hanazawa (#108 Kusano) and Aya Endō (#2 Matsu). The ending theme used in episode eleven is "Kimi o Omou Toki" (きみを想うとき; "When I Think of You") by Hayami. Six DVDs of the first season were released between October 22, 2008 and March 25, 2009. The sixth DVD volume was supplemented with an original video animation (OVA) episode, "Kusano's First Shopping Trip" (初メテノオツカイ, Hajimete no Otsukai; "The First Errand"), featuring Kusano participating in the shopping race with Musubi and Tsukiumi. A Blu-ray box set of the first season was released on June 30, 2010, with three Blu-ray discs and one additional CD. At Anime USA 2009, Funimation announced that the anime's first season was licensed and a DVD box set was released on November 23, 2010.

A second season entitled Sekirei: Pure Engagement (セキレイ～Pure Engagement～) began airing on July 4, 2010 on Tokyo MX and on July 6, 2010, on some other Japanese networks. The first episode of Sekirei: Pure Engagement was pre-aired on June 13, 2010. The opening theme is "Hakuyoku no Seiyaku (Pure Engagement)" (白翼ノ誓約〜Pure Engagement〜) and the ending theme is "Onnaji Kimochi" (おんなじきもち; "Same Feeling"); both songs are performed by Hayami, Inoue, Hanazawa and Endo, as in the first season. The ending theme for episode 10 is "Oboeteiru kara" (おぼえているから; "Remembering You") by Hayami. A single containing both songs was released on July 21, 2010. The limited edition of the single came bundled with a special three-minute OVA, classified as episode 0, titled "Two-Topic Gossip" (閑話弐題, Kanwa Ni Dai). The full 28-minute version of the OVA was released with the first BD/DVD volume of the second season on August 25, 2010. As with the first season, Pure Engagement was licensed in North America by Funimation, and released the series on January 3, 2012. Funimation's licenses for both seasons expired on February 9, 2017. Manga Entertainment released Pure Engagement in the United Kingdom on November 19, 2012.

=== Video game ===
Video game cover of Sekirei: Gifts from the Future, released on October 29, 2009.

A video game for PlayStation 2 entitled Sekirei: Gifts from the Future (セキレイ ～未来からのおくりもの～, Sekirei ~Mirai kara no Okurimono~) was released on October 29, 2009, by Alchemist in limited and regular editions. Two music pieces implemented for the game's music consist of "Yakusoku I'm with You" (約束 I'm with You; "Promise I'm with You") and "Survive Baby Survive!", both of them performed by Saori Hayami, Marina Inoue, Kana Hanazawa and Aya Endō. The limited-edition version was bundled with figures of Musubi and Tsukiumi with Kusano in a panda suit, a 40-minute drama CD, and an illustration of Matsu. While Musubi, Tsukiumi, Matsu, Kusano, Miya, Homura, Uzume and Minato reprise their roles from the anime and manga, four new characters were created by Alchemist consisting of two Sekirei, one Ashikabi and a baby as video game-only characters.

The game is a visual novel. Minato and the Sekirei of Izumo Inn encounter new characters consisting of Sekirei No. 54, Kuruse (来瀬) (Haruka Tomatsu), Sekirei No. 57, Yahan (夜半) (Ayahi Takagaki), Ashikabi Reiji Koya (甲屋 玲治, Koya Reiji) (Yuichi Nakamura) and a baby referred to as Aka-chan (赤ちゃん) (Haruka Tomatsu). The plot centers around the discovery of said baby, who is being pursued by unknown persons after Minato and the Sekirei find her abandoned in the city.

== Reception ==
Volume eight of the Sekirei manga made the top 30 manga sold in Japan, holding third place with 103,811 copies sold from February 24 to March 2, 2009. Volume nine placed 17th out of 30 with 65,732 copies sold from December 21–27, 2009. From June 28 to July 4, 2010, volume ten sold 47,019 copies for a total amount of 120,991 in 20th out of 30.
