= Juvenile Orion =

Trading card game and manga series

- Cover to volume 1 of Juvenile Orion

オリオンの少年 (Orion no Shōnen)
- Manga
- Written by: Sakurako Gokurakuin
- Published by: Enix
- English publisher: NA: Broccoli Books
- Magazine: Monthly Stencil
- Original run: June 2001 – 2003
- Volumes: 5

Juvenile Orion (Japanese: オリオンの少年, Hepburn: Orion no Shōnen) is a trading card game and shōjo manga series. As a spin-off of the Aquarian Age franchise, the story revolves around characters with supernatural powers.

The trading card game was developed and released in Japan by Broccoli Co., Ltd. The manga was written by Sakurako Gokurakuin, otherwise known as Ashika Sakura. It was serialized in Monthly Stencil from June 2001 to August 2003. Originally published in Japan by Square Enix, Broccoli Books also has an English translation of the Juvenile Orion manga.

== Plot ==
The manga follows the story of 16-year-old Mana on an adventure through the Aquarian Age. Mana returns to her hometown to reunite with her childhood friend after having been away for seven years. But her friend, Kaname, seems to have changed while they have been apart.

Mana's re-emergence soon sets off a series of events that alters the lives of Kaname and his best friend, Naoya. Classmates Isshin and Tsukasa, as well as their teacher Tomonori, find themselves drawn in as well. Soon, they discover that they play a part in the "Aquarian Age"—a war that had been raging secretly for thousands of years. By destiny, the future of the world rests in Mana's hands.

== Characters ==
The characters in the Juvenile Orion series include:

- Mana Kirihara (桐原まな, Kirihara Mana): Mana, 16, has just transferred to Seika High. Because of her strong need to protect her loved ones, she agrees to participate in the Aquarian Age. She is kind and persevering, but can be klutzy at times. She cares deeply for Kaname. Since her parents died, she currently lives with her aunt, who is a writer. Mana is a strong Mind-Breaker. Her sudden appearance awakens the dark powers within Kaname, who first avoids her as a result; eventually, they become a couple.
- Kaname Kusakabe (日下部要, Kusakabe Kaname): Kaname, 16, considers himself a typical high school student. He is a little stubborn but straightforward. He lost his parents in an accident when he was younger, and lives with his older sister. He is in the basketball team at school. He is part of the Darklore faction.
- Naoya Itsuki (斎木直哉, Itsuki Naoya): Naoya, 17, is the only male kin of the Itsuki family. An influential power in the E.G.O. faction, he has telepathic ability and has the potential to become a strong Mind-Breaker. He is outgoing and friendly.
- Isshin Shiba (司馬一心, Shiba Isshin or Sima Yi-Xin): Isshin, 18, is an heir to a Chinese conglomerate, and an expert in Chinese martial arts. His hobbies include riding motorcycles and playing basketball, and he's on the same basketball team as Kaname. He is very proper and strait-laced. He is part of the Arayashiki faction.
- Tsukasa Amou (天羽つかさ, Amou Tsukasa): Tsukasa, 16, was suffering from amnesia and was wandering the streets when he was found by Tomonori, with whom he now stays. He is kind and gentle, but gets depressed easily because of his loss of memory. He is part of the Eraser faction.
- Tomonori Nakaura (中浦智律, Nakaura Tomonori): Tomonori, 24, grew up in a Wiz-Dom orphanage, and used to live alone until he found Tsukasa. He is a mathematics teacher at Seika High. Although strict, he is well-liked by his students. He is a great cook and has a low tolerance of alcohol. He is part of the Wiz-Dom faction.
- Haruna Itsuki (斎木榛名, Itsuki Haruna): Haruna, 17, is Naoya's twin sister. She is bed-ridden and connected to a machine that controls her strong powers. She is part of the E.G.O. faction.
- Kaoru (花織, Kaoru): Kaoru is a strong Mind-Breaker who is interested in Mana for unknown reasons.
- Mizunagi (水生, Mizunagi): Mizunagi is a cool, calm guy. He is one of the psychic hunters and is part of the E.G.O. faction.
- Ama-inu (海犬, Amainu): Ama-inu is a hot-blooded psychic who takes pleasure in killing people. he is part of the Darklore faction.
- Kuga (Kuga): Kuga is a handsome psychic who is the closest to Kaoru. He is part of the Wiz-Dom faction.
- Kasei (Kasei): Kasei is a mysterious psychic who doesn't talk much. He carries a long sword on his back and is part of the Arayashiki faction.
- Lafayel: Lafayel is a strong psychic who has great resentment towards Tsukasa Amou. He is one of the psychic hunters and is part of the Eraser faction.

== Factions ==
There are five factions seiryoku (勢力) in Juvenile Orion and Aquarian Age. They are:

- E.G.O: Officially named the "Evolutional Girls Organization," they claim to be a new kind of race with special psychic abilities. They rose to unite the other three factions on Earth.

Jobs: psychic, student, businessman, rock star, athlete, doctor

- Arayashiki: With the power of nature and the gods on their side, they use their own spiritual powers as catalyst for their spells. Arayashiki is the federation that the Eastern spell casters created.

Jobs: shaman, martial artist, onmyōji, ninja, samurai

- Wiz-Dom: The forbidden art of magic has been passed down through generations despite facing much persecution. This secret organization was born in the West, created by these magic-users.

Jobs: priest, witch, sorcerer, wizard, pierrot

- Darklore: Members of Darklore are the descendants of various legendary species that ruled the Earth during ancient times.

Jobs: vampire, werewolf, mermaid/merman, demon

- Eraser: This space crew of aliens suddenly appeared from the outer world. Their merciless attacks on the Earth's four powers gave the faction its name.

Jobs: angels, androids

A sixth faction, Polestar Empire, is introduced in the main Aquarian Age Saga II trading card game and is briefly mentioned in the manga.
