= Reynolds American =

American tobacco company

Reynolds American, Inc.

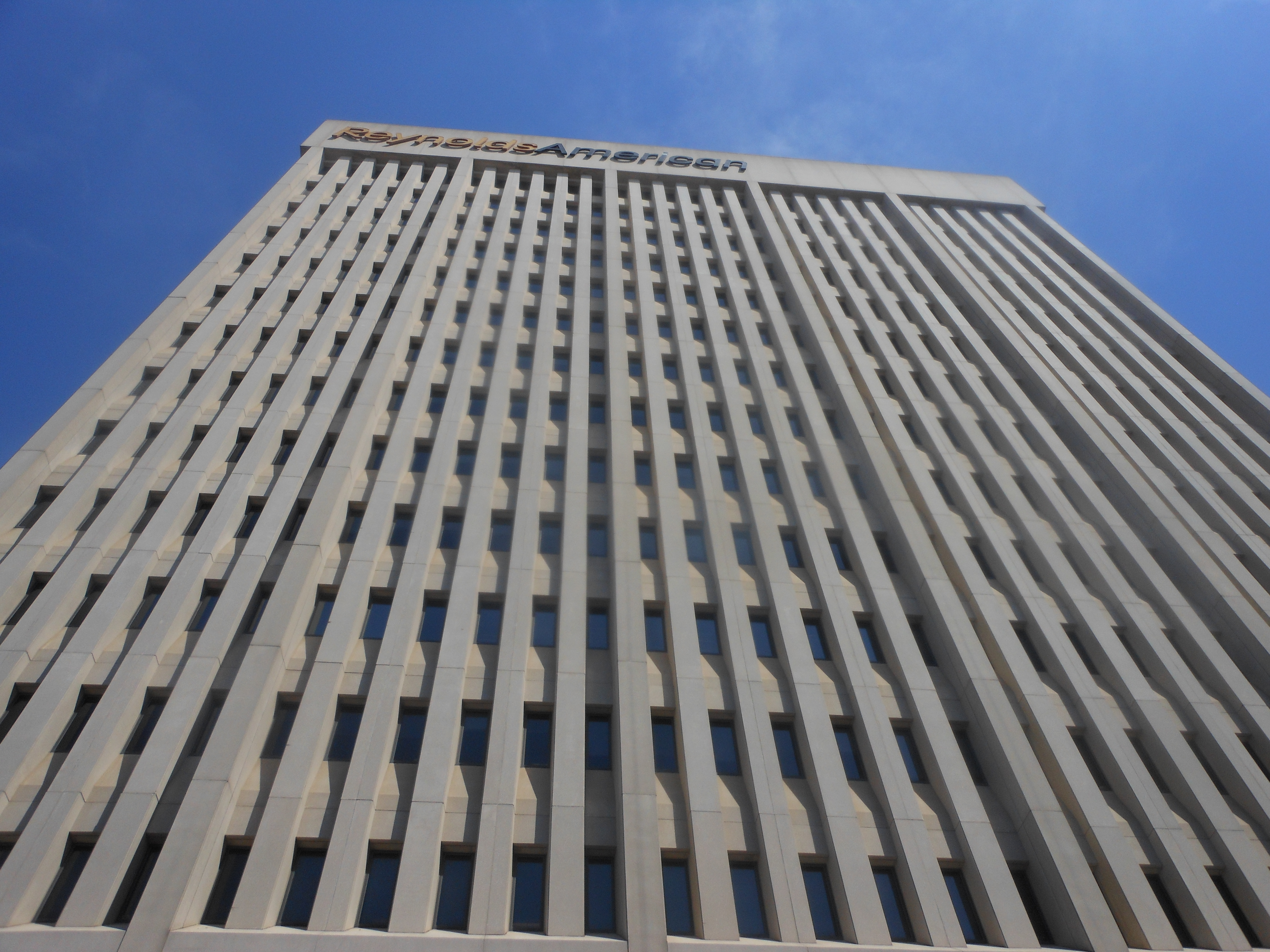
- Reynolds American headquarters at the RJR Plaza Building in Winston-Salem
- Type: Subsidiary
- Industry: Tobacco
- Predecessor: BATUS, Inc. Brown & Williamson; R.J. Reynolds
- Founded: 2004; 22 years ago
- Headquarters: Winston-Salem, North Carolina, United States
- Key people: David Waterfield (president and CEO)
- Products: Cigarettes
- Revenue: ▼US$ 8.236 billion (2013) ▼US$ 8.304 billion (2012)
- Operating income: ▲US$ 3.132 billion (2013) ▼US$ 2.214 billion (2012)
- Net income: ▲US$ 1.718 billion (2013) ▼US$ 1.272 billion (2012)
- Total assets: ▼US$ 15.402 billion (2013) ▲US$ 16.557 billion (2012)
- Total equity: ▼US$ 5.167 billion (2013) ▼US$ 5.257 billion (2012)
- Number of employees: 5,400 (2011)
- Parent: British American Tobacco
- Website: reynoldsamerican.com

Reynolds American, Inc. is an American tobacco company which is a subsidiary of British American Tobacco and is the second-largest tobacco company in the United States. Its holdings include R. J. Reynolds Tobacco Company, American Snuff Company (formerly Conwood Company), Santa Fe Natural Tobacco Company, R. J. Reynolds Vapor Company, and Niconovum AB.

Reynolds American's subsidiaries manufacture and market a variety of tobacco products, including cigarettes (Newport, Camel, Pall Mall, Kent, Doral, Misty, Capri, and Natural American Spirit brands) and moist snuff (Grizzly and Kodiak brands) as well as vaporized electronic cigarettes (Vuse and Sensa brands).

In 2010, Reynolds American's operating companies sold about 28% of all cigarettes sold in the U.S. In July 2014, Reynolds American announced the purchase of Lorillard Tobacco Company in a deal valued at $27 billion. In January 2017, Reynolds American agreed to be purchased by British American Tobacco for $49.4 billion.

== History ==
Reynolds American was formed in January 2004 and began trading publicly on the New York Stock Exchange as RAI in August 2004.

In July 2004, the U.S. business of British American Tobacco (Batus Inc. and Brown & Williamson) combined with that of R. J. Reynolds Tobacco Company (R. J. Reynolds), under the "R. J. Reynolds" name. RJR and Brown & Williamson were the second and third-ranking U.S. tobacco companies prior to the combination. After the combination, R. J. Reynolds became a subsidiary of Reynolds American, with BAT holding a 42% share of RAI. Santa Fe Natural Tobacco Company, which manufactures the additive-free Natural American Spirit brand of tobacco products, also became a subsidiary of Reynolds American at that time.

Prior to becoming RAI operating companies, both R. J. Reynolds and Santa Fe were part of R. J. Reynolds Tobacco Holdings, Inc., which traded on the New York Stock Exchange as RJR. RJR became a subsidiary of RAI in July 2004. R. J. Reynolds was established as a tobacco company in Winston-Salem, North Carolina in 1875.

In 2006, Reynolds American expanded into the smokeless tobacco category, with the acquisition of Conwood from the Pritzker family, the second-biggest smokeless tobacco company in the United States. Conwood manufactures and markets moist and dry snuff, loose leaf, plug, and twist chewing tobaccos. At the time of the acquisition, 70% of Conwood's sales came from the growing moist-snuff segment, with the Grizzly brand showing the fastest growth. Grizzly's continued growth since 2006 has made it the best-selling brand in the moist-snuff category.

In 2008, RAI was recognized as a leader in corporate sustainability by being added to the membership in the 2008-2009 Dow Jones Sustainability North America Index (DJSI North American). RAI is the only U.S. tobacco company and one of 125 North American companies on the index. Selection for the Index is based on performance in a number of economic, environmental and social criteria.

The Wall Street Journal reported in November 2009 that Reynolds American intended to buy Sweden-based Niconovum AB, a maker of products such as nicotine gum, for $44.5 million. The deal was completed in December.

Former Chairman, President and CEO of Reynolds Tobacco Daniel "Daan" Delen assumed the positions of President and CEO of Reynolds American on March 1, 2011, after former president, CEO, and chairwoman Susan Ivey announced she would retire as chairwoman November 1, 2010 and as President and CEO effective February 28, 2011.

Ivey, now known as Susan Cameron, returned as CEO in April 2014 after being elected by the board of directors.

In July 2014, Reynolds American, Inc. announced it would buy Lorillard Tobacco Company for roughly $25 billion a result of slowed sales. The deal is valued at $27.4 billion, including debt. Reynolds agreed to pay $68.88 in cash and stock for every Lorillard share and assume its debt. The deal also included the sale of the Kool, Winston, Salem, and blu brands to Imperial for $7.1 billion. The merger became official on June 12, 2015.

On October 21, 2016, British American Tobacco announced that it had offered to buy the remaining 57.8 percent of Reynolds American for $47 billion. In January 2017, Reynolds American agreed to a $49.4 billion deal, expected to close in the third quarter of the year after approval from both companies' boards of directors. The deal was completed July 25, 2017.

Reynolds American's vapor subsidiary introduced a second e-cigarette brand (alongside the existing Vuse) in July 2024 called Sensa, a zero nicotine disposable product.

== Lawsuits, lobbying, and political influence ==
On September 15, 2016, the former speaker of the US House, John Boehner, joined the board of Reynolds American.

On February 25, 2020, Chief Judge Rodney Gilstrap of the United States District for the Eastern District of Texas determined that Reynolds remained liable for its full portion of an annual $8 billion dollar settlement payment based on a settlement agreement that Reynolds reached with the State of Texas in 1998. Reynolds had previously claimed that its divestiture of several brands to Imperial had extinguished its obligation to make payments for those brands under the 1998 Settlement Agreement. Chief Judge Gilstrap disagreed in a 92-page memorandum opinion and order, finding that Reynolds' position was "oppressive, inequitable, and unreasonable" in addition to being contrary to governing law.

In 2025, Reynolds American was one of the donors who funded the White House's East Wing demolition and planned building of a ballroom.

In April 2026, Reynold American donated $5 million to MAGA Inc., a super PAC backed by President Trump. Several days later, the Trump administration announced a new policy on vapes that the company had sought.
