= Capri (cigarette) =

American brand of cigarettes

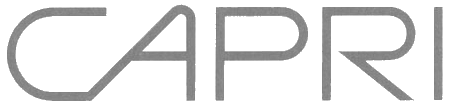
- Product type: Cigarette
- Current owner: R.J. Reynolds
- Produced by: R.J. Reynolds
- Country: United States
- Introduced: 1956; 70 years ago
- Markets: See Markets
- Previous owners: Brown & Williamson
- Tagline: "Menthol, but with a soft, fresh taste.", "The slimmest slim in town", "There is no slimmer way to smoke"

Capri (also known as Caprice in Germany) is an American brand of cigarettes. It is currently owned and manufactured by the R. J. Reynolds Tobacco Company.

== History ==
The first American version of Capri was introduced in 1956 by Lee Brothers Tobacco, as "Capri Rainbows", a high-end brand with different-coloured cigarette papers. At a later point, the Capri trademark was acquired by Brown & Williamson, who first made Capri as a regular-gauge menthol cigarette.

The brand was relaunched in 1987 as the world's first superslim cigarette, and to compete with other slim cigarettes which were marketed towards women at the time, such as Virginia Slims. Susan Cameron was one of the people who oversaw the re-launch of the brand at the time.

When Brown & Williamson merged with R.J. Reynolds in 2004, a new company called Reynolds American was formed, and the company manufactures the brand to this day.

The cigarette has a slim shape at 17mm in circumference and 100mm in length, specifically marketed towards women. By comparison, standard cigarettes are 25mm in circumference, and slim cigarettes are 23mm in circumference. Capri is available in regular light and menthol light varieties, as well as regular and menthol ultra-light varieties. Capri is also available in a 120mm length, which the packaging describes as "luxury length." All versions of Capri are lights or ultra-lights.

== Advertising ==
Before the introduction of the modern-day Capri brand, a few TV advertisements were made in the 1960s to promote a brand under the similar name. The brand was menthol-only and emphasised that, out of the smokers that were tested, Capri was preferred. Its slogan was "Menthol, but with a soft, fresh taste."

Various poster adverts were also made to promote the brand, especially towards young women.

Advertisements for Capri follow the logic that slimmer is better, apparently influenced by the assumption that women prefer to be physically slim, since a slender figure is often presented as more desirable in women’s fashion magazines and by models in the fashion industry. Slogans such as "The slimmest slim in town" (1988) and "There is no slimmer way to smoke" (1994) provided a not-so-subliminal message that by smoking Capri cigarettes, consumers could count on obtaining or maintaining a slimmer figure than everyone else.

In 2000, it was reported that advertising for Capri, which was managed by "Bates Advertising" would be transferred to Grey Global Group. Grey also managed advertising for Carlton, Pall Mall, GPC and Misty brands. Additionally, Grey would remain B&W's agency-of- record. Bates would maintain account responsibilities for Kool and Lucky Strike brands.

== Controversies ==
=== Lawsuit from island of Capri ===
In May 1989, the Italian island of Capri sued Brown & Williamson for using the name on their ultra-slim cigarette brand.

A lawsuit that the island filed against the Louisville-based tobacco company went to trial in Rome on June 30, 1989. Capri officials say they do not want their paradise associated with a potentially harmful product, and Brown & Williamson has no right to market a cigarette in Italy if Capri vetoes the plan. The manufacturer has contended that the action is groundless because the company has complied with "all applicable laws in securing rights to use the Capri name in Italy and in other countries where the brand is sold," said company spokeswoman Valerie Oates. Oates said the company obtained necessary approvals from Italian trademark officials and the nationally owned cigarette distribution system.

=== Nicotine levels ===
In 1995, there was further controversy when the former B&W vice president and chemical researcher Jeffrey Wigand defected from the company.

Wigand revealed the company’s secrets, saying that they had been adding unreported chemicals to the cigarettes. The Kool, Capri, and Viceroy cigarettes had increased nicotine levels to promote higher addiction factors, therefore promoting sales.

== Markets ==
Capri is mainly sold in the United States, but also once was or still is sold in Mexico, Saint Kitts and Nevis, Costa Rica, Brazil, West Germany, Germany (where the brand is known as "Caprice" due to a trademark issue), Switzerland, Italy, Iceland, Belarus, Ukraine, Russia, Israel, Hong Kong and Japan.

== See also ==
- Smoking culture
