= American Tobacco Company Warehouses Complex =

- U.S. National Register of Historic Places
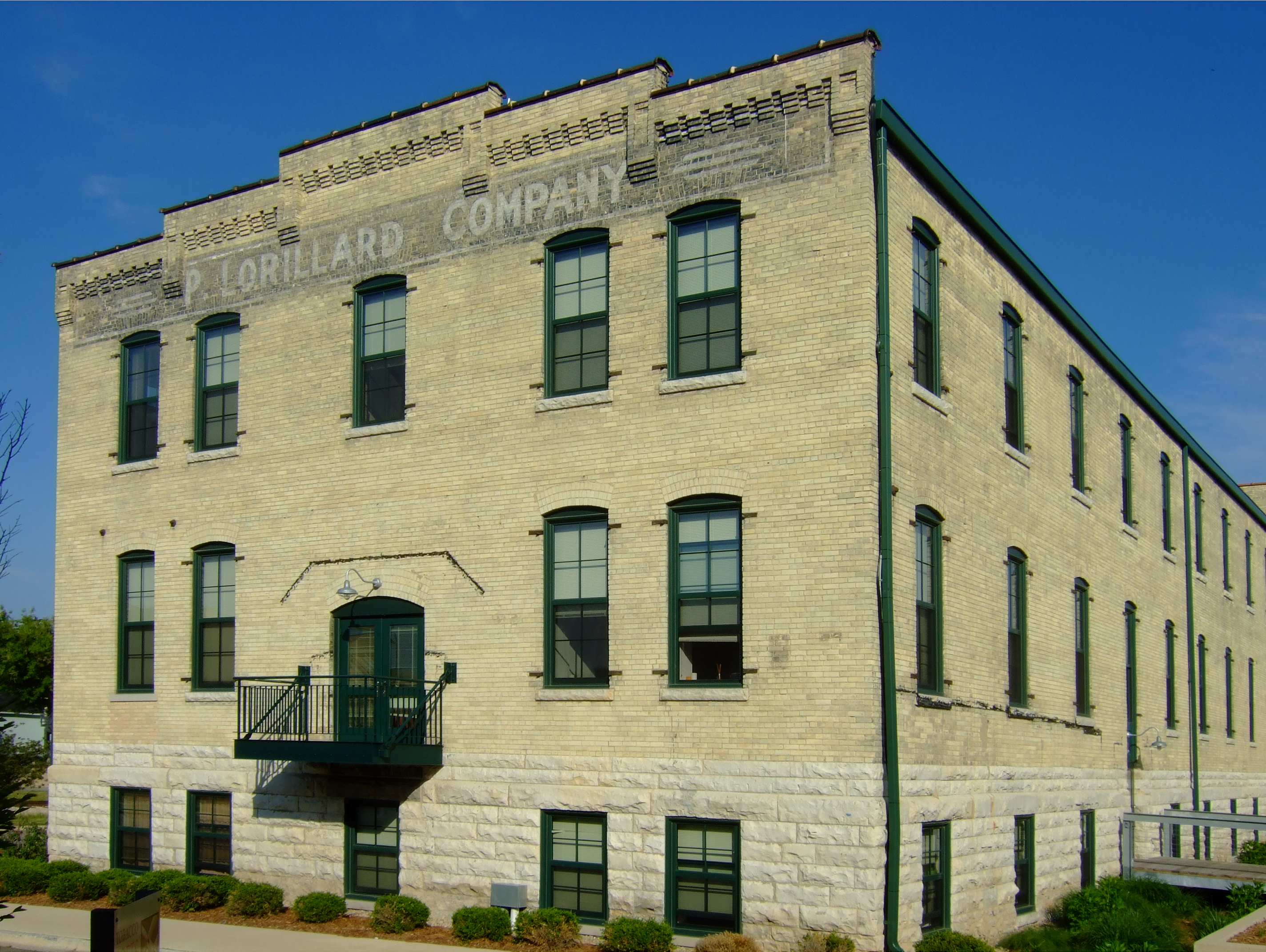
- The 1899 building

- Location within Wisconsin Location within the United States
- Location: 651 W. Doty St., Madison, Wisconsin
- Coordinates: 43°03′57″N 89°23′30″W
- Area: 1 acre (0.40 ha)
- Built: 1899-1901
- Architect: Claude and Starck
- Architectural style: Late 19th and Early 20th Century American Movements
- NRHP reference No.: 03000580
- Added to NRHP: June 26, 2003

The American Tobacco Company Warehouses Complex is a pair of brick warehouses built around 1900 in Madison, Wisconsin. They are now the two most intact remnants of Madison's tobacco industry, and were added to the National Register of Historic Places in 2003.

== Background ==
Tobacco was commercially grown in Wisconsin starting in the 1850s. Cultivation here expanded during the Civil War when many of the states that were big tobacco-producers seceded, but demand for Wisconsin tobacco continued after the war, mainly for the leaf tobacco used for cigar wrappers. One region of cultivation spanned southern Dane County and into Rock and Jefferson counties. The area's first tobacco warehouse was built in 1869 in Edgerton by New York's Schroder and Bond Co.

Madison was a good spot for processing tobacco because of its rail connections and because it was in the Dane and Rock County tobacco-growing region. Several firms started packing leaf tobacco in Madison about 1880: Klauber & Kohner, Mr. H. Grove, and Sutter Brothers. Later came Barnard & Wilder, F.S. Bains, Pelton & Klauber, and A. Cohn & Co. of New York.

The American Tobacco Company had roots in 1874 North Carolina, where Confederate veteran Washington Duke and his sons started a tobacco-processing factory. W. Duke, Sons & Co. prospered and through a series of purchases and mergers sometimes called the "cigarette war," by 1890 had gained control of most of the American tobacco industry, naming their trust the American Tobacco Company. In 1899 American Tobacco bought a million dollars' worth of tobacco in Edgerton and two weeks later, announced that it would establish an agency and build a warehouse in Madison.

== Warehouses in Madison ==
Shortly, the first warehouse began to take shape. The Chicago, Milwaukee & St. Paul Railroad sold American Tobacco a strip of land along its track at Doty Street, which was then called Clymer St., in a mixed neighborhood small houses, industrial buildings, and coal yards. That 1899 east building was built by contractor T.C. McCarthy, with a 52 by 126-foot footprint on a raised foundation of rock-faced granite blocks. Above that the walls are cream brick. Windows of the second and third stories are topped with segmental brick arches. The northwest end is topped with a stepped parapet with corbelled brickwork, shown in the photo. The sides of the building were broken by loading doors facing the railroad spurs that ran alongside. Inside the 1899 building each level was a single large room, except the first story had two small rooms partitioned off on the north end - an office and a sample room.

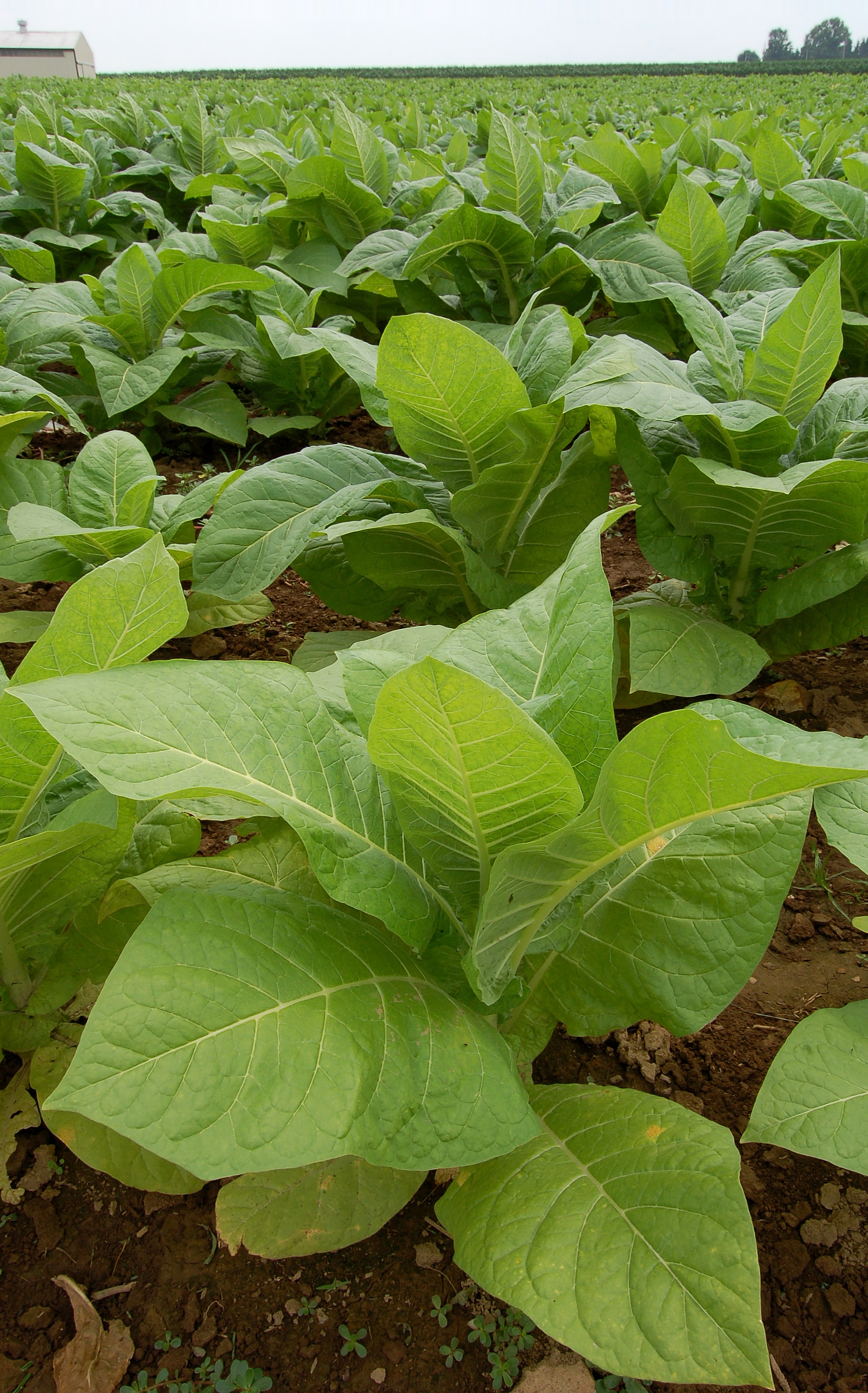

The general functions of the warehouse were to receive tobacco from the supplier, then cut, sort and pack the tobacco, and store the cases of tobacco until they could be shipped.

In March 1900 the Wisconsin Tobacco Reporter described early operations at the warehouse:

The American Tobacco company presents a busy scene in West Madison on the St. Paul tracks opposite the Findlay warehouse. Here, under Mr. Strauss, 87 girls are employed with a total of 100 persons assorting tobacco. These girls receive from $5 to $10 a week for their work and the new industry is making the local servant girl problems more difficult than ever. The tobacco comes in from Dane and adjoining counties in bunches, and the business of the girls is to sort it according to length.

American Tobacco must have been satisfied with the 1899 building because in 1900 they extended it 150 feet on the south end from 126 to 276 feet. This section's design is similar to the original building, except the walls are six feet taller.

The Madison Democrat from January 1901 provides another peek back in time:

While it is true that the bulk of the employment is given to women and girls, the heavier work falls to the men, and in some warehouses they, too are employed as sorters. Men can make good wages at that work if they are deft enough with their fingers. There is also a vast change in the sanitary conditions of the warehouses of today as compared with those of years ago. The mammoth structure of the American Tobacco company at West Madison is an instance in point. The large sorting room 50 feet by 272 feet is divided into two sections, one of which is occupied by men and boys, the other is assigned to women and girls. These, as well as the whole three story building, are steam heated, electric lighted, and comfortable in every respect. Sewerage and city water are a feature of the equipment.

Of the numerous warehouses in the city the one of the American Tobacco company is the most pretentious. Here work began Dec. 17 with almost 350 hands on the pay roll, the relative proportion being about half and half. Some of the women sorters make as high as $1.50 per day. Last year the work lasted until the middle of May, thus making the industry, if such it may be called, one of much importance to that section of the city. The supply of tobacco comes in by rail and from near by points by wagon.

A second warehouse with a larger footprint was added to the west in 1901 - 68 by 309 feet and one story tall. The style was similar to the east building but it was only one story, with no basement underneath. It was an early design of Claude & Starck, who would go on to design many homes in Madison and libraries around Wisconsin. Again, T.C. McCarthy was the mason. J.H. Findorff did the carpentry work.

In 1911 the American Tobacco Company was found to be in violation of the Sherman Antitrust Act and was split into competing companies American Tobacco, R.J. Reynolds, Lorillard, and others. Lorillard ended up buying the warehouse complex in Madison, and its name was long painted across the end of the 1901 building.

As smokers shifted from cigars to cigarettes, American Tobacco introduced its successful cigarette Lucky Strike in 1916 and later Pall Mall. But with the decline of cigars, demand dropped for Wisconsin tobacco, since cigarettes are wrapped in paper - not leaf tobacco. Other tobacco warehouses around Madison closed, but this complex continued operation until about 1939. After it closed, J.H. Findorff & Son used the buildings for storage. More recently, they have been converted into apartments and called the 'Tobacco Lofts'.

The warehouses were placed on the NRHP in 2003 because they are the best intact representatives of the once-important tobacco industry in Madison.
