= Batus Inc. =

US subsidiary of British American Tobacco

British American Tobacco US, Inc.
- Type: Subsidiary
- Industry: Tobacco; Retail; Insurance
- Founded: 1980; 46 years ago
- Defunct: 2004; 22 years ago
- Fate: Merged with the other BAT's U.S. business (Brown & Williamson and R.J. Reynolds to form Reynolds American)
- Successor: Reynolds American
- Headquarters: Kentucky, United States
- Area served: United States
- Key people: David Schechter (Director)
- Products: Cigarettes
- Parent: British American Tobacco
- Subsidiaries: Appleton Paper Co. Farmers Insurance Group

British American Tobacco US (BATUS) was the American subsidiary of multinational company British American Tobacco (BAT), the world's second largest cigarette manufacturer. BATUS served as the U.S. holding company for BAT. In the 1960s, the company diversified into areas such as insurance, drink, and retail.

In 2004, BATUS merged with the other BAT's U.S. business, Brown & Williamson and R.J. Reynolds, to form Reynolds American.

== History ==
BATUS was created by British American Tobacco as a subsidiary to oversee the U.S. holdings in 1980. Through its BATUS unit, BAT diversified its tobacco holdings with acquisitions in the retail sector, paper sector (through the acquisition of Appleton Paper Company) and insurance through the acquisition of Farmers Insurance Group.

Management for BATUS was initially derived from Brown & Williamson Tobacco with B&W's CEO and chairman of the board, Joseph E. Edens, becoming the first president of BATUS in 1980. Edens retired as president in 1981 and was replaced by Charlie McCarty. In 1985, Hank Frigon was elected chief operating officer of the company and it was announced that he would succeed McCarty after he retired.

In 1972, BATUS acquired Kohl Food and Department Stores from the Kohl family. In 1973, the company acquired Saks Fifth Avenue and Gimbel Brothers.

In 1982, BATUS acquired Marshall Field & Co and Frederick & Nelson for $310 million.

In 1986, BATUS sold Gimbels to various companies including May Department Stores and Allied Stores. Also in 1986, four investors acquired Kohl's in a leveraged buyout.

To manage the large retail holdings, BAT and BATUS created BATUS Retail Group in the 1980s. The group expanded the current store presence of existing businesses and developed Thimbles, a women's clothing company.

In 1988, BATUS acquired Farmers Group Inc. In 1989, Sir James Goldsmith attempted a hostile takeover of BAT. In an effort to fend off the takeover, BAT divested much of its U.S. operations to raise capital and focus the business. BRG and BATUS was shut down and some remaining administrative operations were consolidated back to Brown and Williamson Tobacco.

While the company was not required to file an annual report since they were a subsidiary of British American Tobacco based in London, they did produce reports to assist with financing and investments in the United States. One of BATUS' primary responsibilities was the management of funding and cash from US operations.

== Department stores owned by BATUS ==
- The Crescent of Spokane, Washington (became Frederick & Nelson 1988) In 1982, BATUS purchased Marshall Field's, owners of The Crescent. BATUS sold The Crescent with Frederick & Nelson in 1986.
- Frederick & Nelson of Seattle, Washington (closed 1992, flagship became a Nordstrom in 1998) In 1982, BATUS purchased Marshall Field's, owners of Frederick & Nelson. BATUS sold Frederick & Nelson with The Crescent in 1986.
- Gimbels of New York City, Philadelphia, Pittsburgh and Milwaukee (now Macy's) Brown and Williamson purchased Gimbels in 1973. BATUS closed the division in 1986. Some stores were taken over by sister division Marshall Field's, which became Macy's in 2006.
- J.B. Ivey of Charlotte, North Carolina, and Jacksonville, Florida (now Dillard's) In 1982, BATUS purchased Marshall Field's, owners of Ivey's. BATUS sold Ivey's in 1990 to Dillard's.
- Kohl's of Wisconsin (still operating) In 1972, BATUS purchased Kohl's. The Kohl's grocery stores were sold to A&P in 1983. BATUS sold Kohl's department stores in 1986.
- Marshall Field's of Chicago, Illinois (now Macy's) In 1982, BATUS purchased Marshall Field's. BATUS sold Marshall Field's to Dayton Hudson Corporation (now Target Corporation) in 1990. Marshall Field's was then purchased by May Department Stores in 2004. May Department Stores was purchased in 2005 by Federated Department Stores, which renamed all of the stores Macy's in 2006.
- Saks Fifth Avenue of New York City, New York (still operating) Brown and Williamson acquired Saks Fifth Avenue in 1973 with its acquisition of Gimbels. In 1990, BATUS sold Saks to Investcorp S.A., which later sold Saks to Proffitt's, Inc.; that firm in turn changed its name to Saks Incorporated. Purchased by Hudson Bay Company in 2013.
