= Doral (cigarette) =

American brand of cigarettes

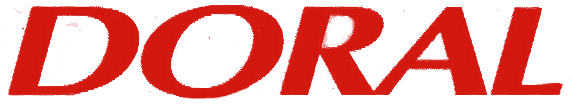
- Product type: Cigarette
- Current owner: R.J. Reynolds
- Produced by: R.J. Reynolds
- Country: United States
- Introduced: 1969; 57 years ago
- Markets: United States, Argentina
- Tagline: "Taste me!", "Premium Taste, Guaranteed."

Doral is an American brand of cigarettes, currently owned and manufactured by the R.J. Reynolds Tobacco Company.

== History ==
Doral was first introduced in 1969 and is now available nationwide in the United States.

Originally considered a premium brand, the cigarettes were re-branded in 1984 as a savings brand. This made Doral the first officially branded cigarette in the value-savings market.

In 1984, The New York Times tested various "low tar" and "low nicotine" brands and the tests concluded that Doral King Size and Doral King Size menthol had 5 MG of tar, 0,4 MG of nicotine and 3 MG of carbon monoxide.

In 1999, it was reported that, due to R.J. Reynolds' sponsoring of various sport sponsorships, the brand was the third largest tobacco brand after Marlboro and Newport.

In October 2014, it was reported that R.J. Reynolds might add another brand that had to be sold off to Imperial Tobacco (along with the Kool, Salem, Winston and Maverick brands) to secure the approval of the Federal Trade Commission to purchase the Lorillard Tobacco Company. This did not happen, however, and R.J. Reynolds still sells the brand today.

Doral currently receives limited support from R.J. Reynolds, as Pall Mall has taken over as the company's primary discount brand.

== Advertisements ==
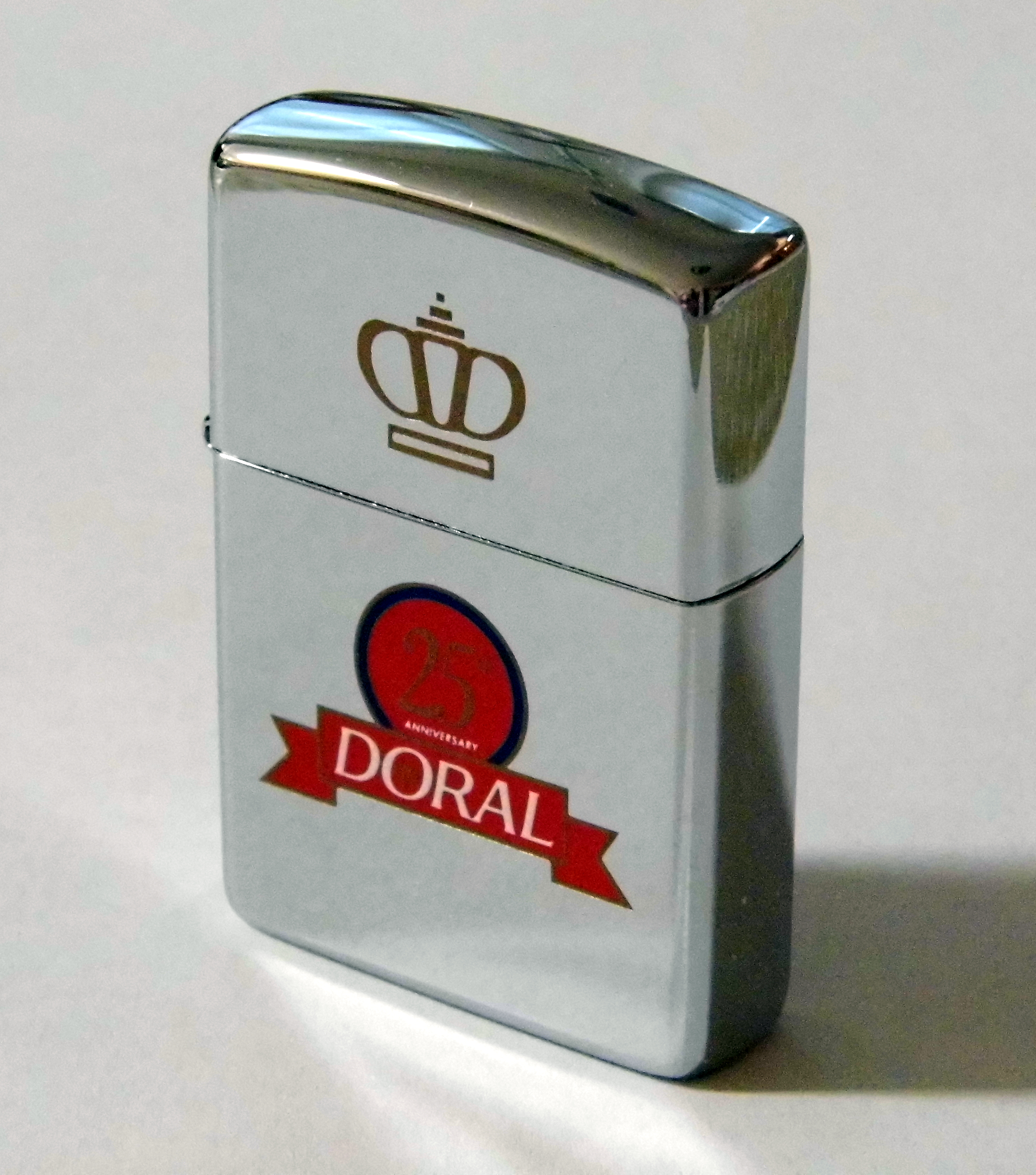
Vintage Zippo cigarette lighter commemorating the 25th anniversary of Doral cigarettes

R.J. Reynolds made various poster advertisements to promote the Doral brand. Magazine advertisements were done in comic strip format, such as one with a lion tamer worried about what his Doral pack sang.

Doral's current slogan is "Premium Taste, Guaranteed". An early slogan was "Taste me!" done with female voices on broadcast commercials. This was lampooned by George Carlin in his 1972 stand-up bit "Sex in Commercials".

In 1972 and 1973, Doral was a sponsor of the NASTAR skiing competition, which they promoted with a "Doral-NASTAR Award".

R.J. Reynolds also printed cigarette cards for Doral during the years 2000-2001.

As of 2019, Doral held a market share of less than 1%.

== See also ==
- Tobacco smoking
