= Kent (cigarette) =

American brand of cigarettes

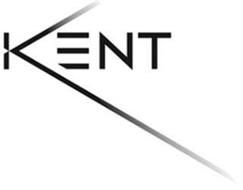
- Product type: Cigarette
- Current owner: British American Tobacco
- Produced by: British American Tobacco; R.J. Reynolds
- Country: United States
- Introduced: 1952; 74 years ago
- Related brands: Barclay
- Markets: See Markets
- Previous owners: Lorillard

Kent is an American brand of cigarettes, currently owned and manufactured by R.J. Reynolds Tobacco Company in the United States and British American Tobacco elsewhere. The brand is named after Herbert Kent, a former executive at Lorillard Tobacco Company.

== History ==
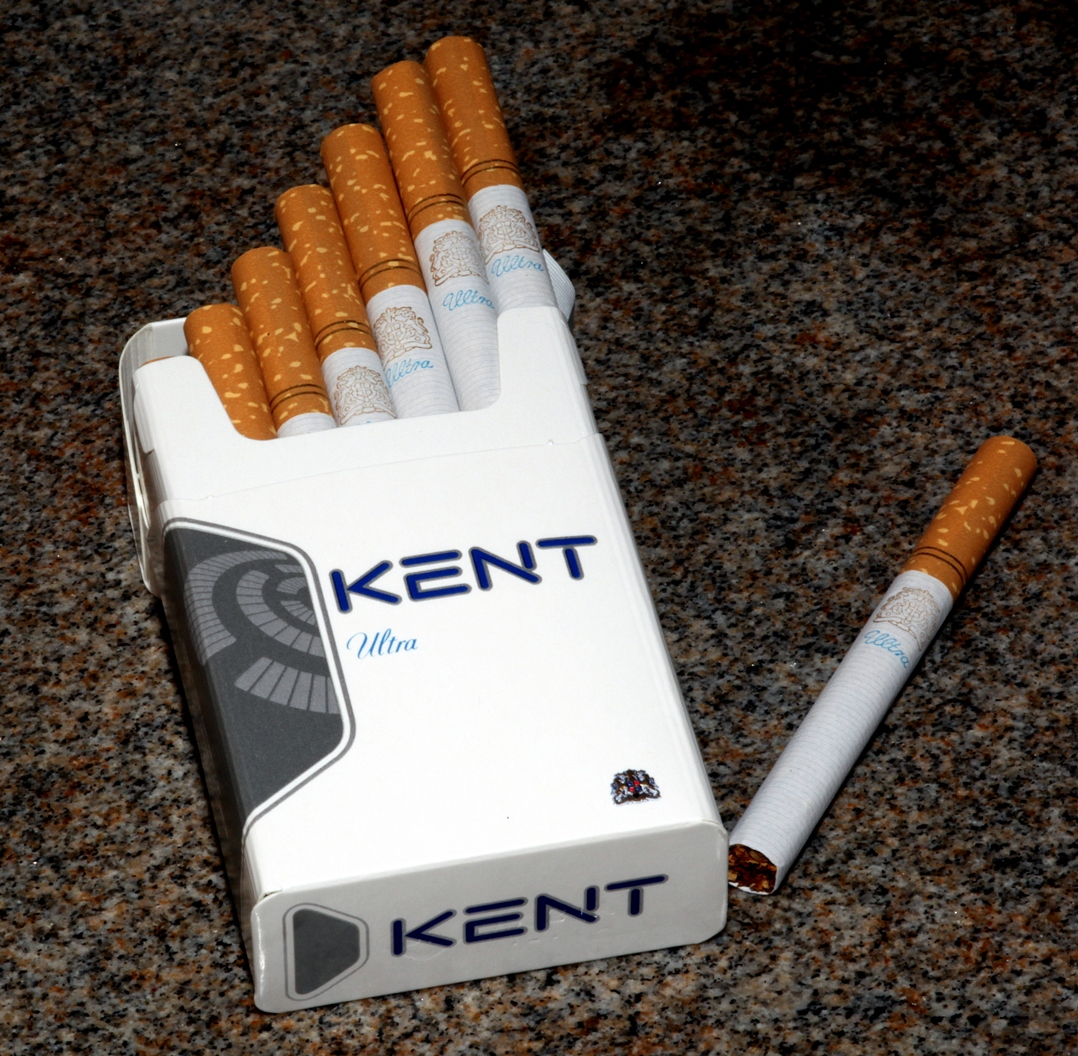
An old pack of Kent Ultras from South Africa

Widely recognized by many as the first popular filtered cigarette, Kent was introduced by the Lorillard Tobacco Company in 1952 around the same time a series of articles entitled "cancer by the carton", published by Reader's Digest, scared American consumers into seeking out a filter brand at a time when most brands were filterless. (Viceroy cigarettes had been the first to introduce filters, in 1936.)

Kent widely touted its "famous micronite filter" and promised consumers the "greatest health protection in history". Sales of Kent skyrocketed, and it has been estimated that in Kent's first four years on the market, Lorillard sold some 13 billion Kent cigarettes.

From March 1952 until at least May 1956, however, the "Micronite filter" in Kent cigarettes contained a mixture of crimped crêpe paper and compressed blue asbestos, the most carcinogenic type of asbestos. It has been suspected that many cases of mesothelioma have been caused specifically by smoking the original Kent cigarettes, and various lawsuits followed over the years because of it. Lorillard quietly changed the filter material from asbestos to the more common cellulose acetate in mid-1956. Kent continued to grow until the late 1960s, then began a long, steady decline as more filtered cigarette brands promising even lower tar (and appealing to smokers' desires for a "safer" smoke) were introduced.

Kent Cigarettes sponsored The Dick Van Dyke Show during its second season, and actor Dick Van Dyke filmed many spots smoking them, along with Rose Marie and Morey Amsterdam. The cigarettes were touted as being packaged in a "crush proof box".

Kent experienced moderate success among major cigarette brands, placing within the top ten in 1970, but its market position declined significantly over the next decade, and it was no longer among the leading brands by 1979.

While continuing domestic sale and production, Lorillard sold the overseas rights of Kent and all of its other brands in 1977, and today Kents manufactured outside the U.S. are property of British American Tobacco. It eventually became one of their most popular brands, along with Dunhill, Lucky Strike, Pall Mall, and Rothmans.

On June 15, 2014, Reynolds American offered to buy the Lorillard tobacco company for $27.4 billion and effective June 12, 2015, the Kent brand became the property of R. J. Reynolds Tobacco Company.

Various advertising posters were made for Kent cigarettes, ranging from 1955 until 1986. One particular series of ads implied that smoking and eating were synonymous—in both pleasure and necessity.

== Kent in Romania ==
Between 1970 and 1990 Kent was the most sought after cigarette in Romania and in some parts of the domestic market used as payment or bribe. In the latter part of this era, Kent was no longer available in regular retail, being sold officially only in hard currency shops. Obviously, the black market was thriving at the time, as most Kents were being smuggled in by those relatively few Romanians who were allowed to travel abroad (sea and air crew, diplomatic staff, etc.) The 2004 debut short film Un cartuș de Kent și un pachet de cafea (lit. ''A carton of Kent and a packet of coffee'') by Cristi Puiu is titled after the bribes discussed in the film.

== Markets ==
Kent is or was sold in the following countries: Jordan, Belgium, Brazil, Republic of Ireland, United Kingdom, Norway, Cyprus, Sweden, Finland, Estonia, Luxembourg, Netherlands, Greece, Switzerland, Spain, Italy, Poland, Romania, Israel, Moldova, Czech Republic, Croatia, Iraq, Albania, Latvia, Lithuania, Belarus, Ukraine, Russia, Azerbaijan, Georgia, Kazakhstan, Uzbekistan, Egypt, South Africa, Syria, Iran, United States, Kosovo, Mexico, El Salvador, Chile, Turkey, Peru, Brazil, Paraguay, Argentina, Vietnam, Australia, Singapore, Mongolia, China, Saudi Arabia, Hong Kong, Lebanon, Japan, Puerto Rico and South Korea.

== See also ==
- Tobacco smoking
- Mesothelioma
