= Reynolds Building =

- U.S. National Register of Historic Places
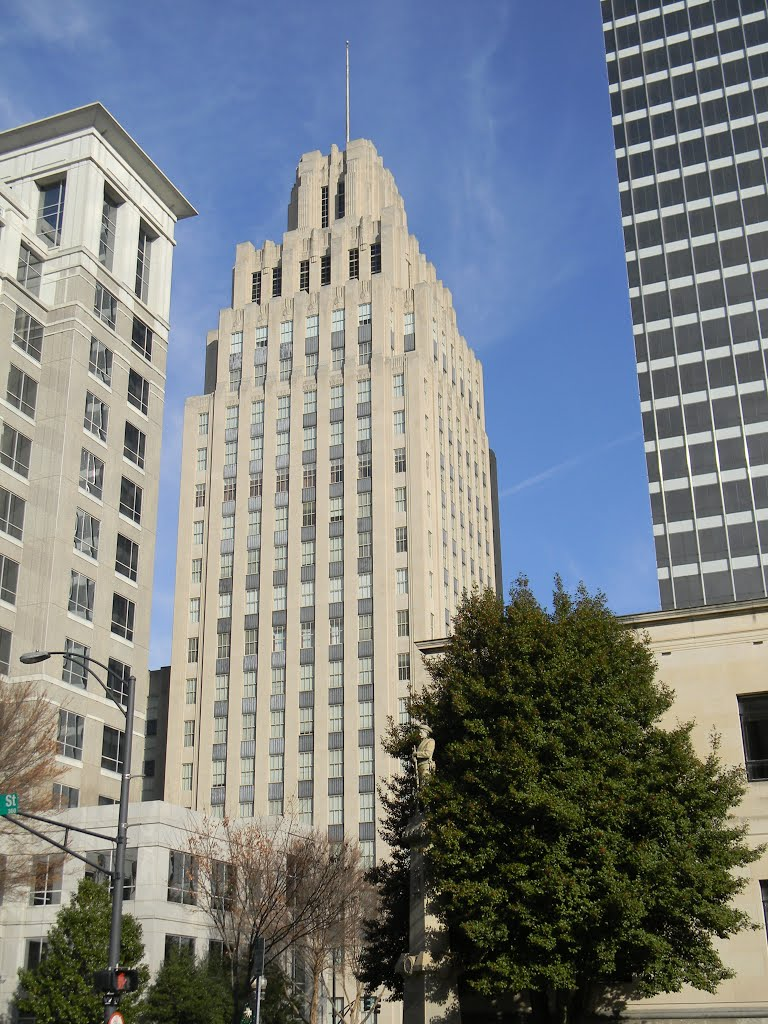
- Reynolds Building street view

- Location within North Carolina Location within the United States
- Location: 51 E. 4th St., Winston-Salem, North Carolina
- Coordinates: 36°5′56″N 80°14′40″W
- Area: 0.55 acres (0.22 ha)
- Built: 1928-1929
- Built by: James Baird Company
- Architect: Shreve & Lamb
- Architectural style: Art Deco
- NRHP reference No.: 14000494
- Added to NRHP: August 19, 2014

The Reynolds Building is a 314-foot (96 m) Art Deco skyscraper at 51 East 4th Street in Winston-Salem, North Carolina. It was completed in 1929 and has 21 floors with 313,996 square feet (29,171.2 m^{2}) of space. For much of its history the building served as headquarters for R. J. Reynolds Tobacco Company. After a sale to PMC Property Group in 2014, the building went through an estimated $60 million in renovations. In March 2016, The Residences @ the R.J. Reynolds Building, apartments located on the top 11 floors, opened. The first six floors opened as the Kimpton Cardinal Hotel in April. Katharine Brasserie & Bar, a restaurant named for Katharine Smith Reynolds, followed in May.

== History ==
The site of the Reynolds Building at Fourth and Main streets was previously home to Winston's first city hall, built in 1892 and used as the first Winston-Salem city hall after the 1913 merger with the town of Salem. When the city needed a larger city hall, the old one was torn down.

When completed for $2.7 million ($36.3 million in 2016 dollars) as the headquarters of R. J. Reynolds Tobacco Company, it was the tallest building between Baltimore, Maryland; Birmingham, Alabama; and the Miami-Dade County Courthouse, and it won a national architecture award. It succeeded the Nissen Building in Winston-Salem as the tallest building in North Carolina. Winston Tower succeeded the Reynolds Building as tallest in the state.

The building is well known for being a design inspiration for the much larger Empire State Building that was built in 1931 in New York City. There is a legend that every year the staff of the Empire State Building sends a Father's Day card to the staff at the Reynolds Building in Winston-Salem to pay homage to its role as predecessor to the Empire State Building. It was listed on the National Register of Historic Places in 2014.

The building was designed, just as the Empire State Building, for the purpose of corporate offices with retail outlets on the first floor. Shreve & Lamb, the architects, were asked for "an effect of conservatism along with attractiveness, but to avoid flashiness." But regarding the result, a 1997 Winston-Salem Journal article said, "city residents could be forgiven for wondering whether the architects followed the directive" because "Gray-brown marble from Missouri, black marble from Belgium and buff-colored marble from France covered the walls and floor.

The ceiling was festooned with gold leaves, and the grillwork, elevator doors and door frames were bright, gleaming brass." The stock market crash of 1929 hurt the Reynolds Building's leasing business temporarily, but it was more successful than other similar buildings at leasing offices. Its promotional brochure said that the 14th, 15th, and fourth floors were reserved for doctors and dentists, but this might not have been the case. Most of the offices were occupied by organizations related to the tobacco industry, such as railroads, insurance companies, and attorneys.

=== 21st century ===
On November 23, 2009, the Winston-Salem Journal reported that Reynolds American, Inc., put the building up for sale after cutting jobs and moving many offices into the Plaza Building next door. Forsyth County tax records showed the Reynolds Building's value as $12.3 million. The building offered 240,000 square feet (22,000 m^{2}) of office space, much of that Class B.

In 2012, Davis-Weaver Restaurants and Hotels, which owned the Proximity and O. Henry hotels in nearby Greensboro, considered plans to turn the building into a luxury hotel for business travelers, but ultimately chose not to proceed.

In March 2013, Reynolds American selected CBRE to market the building, which the company intended to sell for $15 million. Philadelphia-based PMC Property Group, which renovates historic buildings, and San Francisco-based Kimpton Hotels & Restaurants Group bought the Reynolds Building for $7.8 million. Plans call for "a boutique hotel, restaurant and upscale apartments."

In August 2014, the Reynolds Building was named to the National Register of Historic Places. Historic status, with its tax incentives, were expected to make the building more attractive.

On November 5, 2015, Kimpton said its Kimpton Cardinal Hotel would have 174 rooms on the building's first six floors, along with 36 suites, a fitness center, a restaurant and bar, and 6400 square feet of meeting space. On December 15, Kimpton said the restaurant on the ground floor would be named Katharine Brasserie & Bar after Katharine Smith Reynolds, the wife of R.J. Reynolds, and that it would be separate from the hotel.

The 7th through 19th floors (there is no 13th floor because of superstition dating to the building's construction) opened in March as The Residences @ the R.J. Reynolds Building, with 20 apartments on the first four of those floors and six on the remaining floors. 65 percent would be 700 square feet with one bedroom and the rest would be 830 to 1000 square feet with two bedrooms. The 19th floor apartments are tied with those in the Nissen Building for highest residential space. Different elevators serve the hotel and the apartments. The 20th floor mezzanine would have meeting space and the top two floors would house mechanical equipment.

The Kimpton's grand opening took place on April 27, 2016, the building's 87th birthday. The restaurant opened on May 2.

The $60 million in renovations included the lobby that would look familiar to those who worked in the building decades ago, described this way in an article by Robert Lopez that appeared on the Winston-Salem Journal web site.

Straight ahead from the main entrance is the elevator bank, gold and silver leaf ceiling overhead, and brass doors polished to a blinding finish. An octagonal hall just past the elevators is clad is [sic] St. Genevieve golden vein marble. All around is metalwork featuring stylized tobacco leaves and diamond patterns.
