= Susan Cameron =

American businessperson (born 1958)

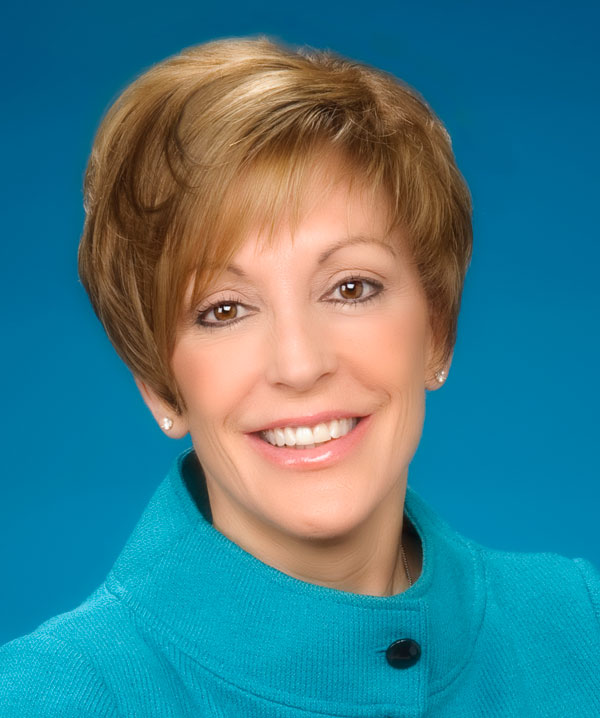
- Born: Susan Hickok; October 31, 1958 (age 68); Schenectady, New York, US
- Other name: Susan Ivey
- Education: University of Florida (BS); Bellarmine University (MBA)
- Occupation: Business person
- Known for: President, CEO and chairman of Reynolds American, Inc.
- Spouse: Russell Cameron

Susan M. Cameron (born October 31, 1958) is an American businessperson who is the former chairman, president, and CEO of Reynolds American, Inc.

== Early life and education ==
Cameron was born in Schenectady, New York, and raised in Fort Lauderdale. Her father was a manager with General Electric and her mother was a secretary and school volunteer. The family moved to Florida when she was two, and she graduated from Ft. Lauderdale High School in 1976. She earned a B.S. in business from the University of Florida in 1980 and an MBA from Bellarmine University in 1984.

== Business career ==
Cameron's first job in the industry was as sales representative for Brown & Williamson in 1981. She was promoted to district sales manager in 1983, then moved to London in 1990 to serve as a brand director for Brown and Williamson's parent company, British American Tobacco. In 1994 she became Director of Marketing in China, based in Hong Kong, then moved back to England in 1996 to become Head of International Brands.

She returned to the United States and to Brown & Williamson in 1999 to join the company's executive committee as senior vice president of marketing. Cameron was named president and CEO of Brown & Williamson in January 2001, the first woman CEO of a major cigarette business.

In July 2004, Brown & Williamson combined with R. J. Reynolds, and Reynolds American, Inc. was created as a new holding company, with R. J. Reynolds Tobacco Company as its chief operating subsidiary. Cameron became president and CEO of the company in 2004. She became chairman in January 2006. She also served as chairman of R. J. Reynolds from July 2004 through April 2008. As head of Reynolds American, Cameron has guided the company's efforts into the smokeless tobacco category

When Cameron retired in 2009 she was one of the country's most highly paid women executives; her compensation for 2009 was $16.2 million from a base salary of $1.2 million.

In December 2010 Cameron retired as the chairwoman of Reynolds and in February 2011 she left her positions as president and chief executive. After spending several years in retirement, she re-joined the board at Reynolds in January 2014, returning to the role of CEO on May 1. Ten weeks after her return from retirement, the company announced that it was planning to purchase Lorillard for $27.4 billion. The deal, which took place in mid-July, 2014, was history-making: the acquisition is the largest to have been led by a woman. In January 2017, Debra Crew replaced Cameron as president and CEO of Reynolds. Cameron served as executive chairman of the Reynolds board of directors until May 2017, when she became non-executive chairman.

== Views on cigarette use ==
Cameron does not deny that cigarette smoking can be dangerous. "Smoking harms people," she said. Reynolds' Chairman of the Board Tom Wajnert said that Cameron takes a strong stand about the dangers of smoking: "Susan has been more open and aggressive than most people in the industry. "She adds, "We all feel the same way. Cigarettes are deadly. They kill people. But at the same time, it's a legal product."

== Recognition and honors ==
In 2009, Forbes ranked Cameron as the 59th most powerful woman in the world.

Then known as Susan Ivey, in 2010 she was ranked 22nd in Fortune magazine's listing of the 50 Most Powerful Women in Business. In Forbes magazine's listing of the World's Most Powerful Women in 2010, she was ranked number 75.

In 2016, Cameron ranked at number 66 on the Forbes list of The 100 Most Powerful Women.

== Board memberships ==
Cameron serves on the boards of a number of philanthropic organizations. These include the Women's Leadership Initiative for the United Way of America, local chapters of the United Way and YWCA, as well as Senior Services, Inc. She also serves on the boards of Salem College, the University of Florida Foundation and RR Donnelley, Tupperware, and Aramark.

== Personal ==
During her retirement from 2010 until 2014 Susan changed her name from Ivey to that of her husband Russell Cameron.
