= Nissen Building =

Historic building in North Carolina, US

- U.S. National Register of Historic Places
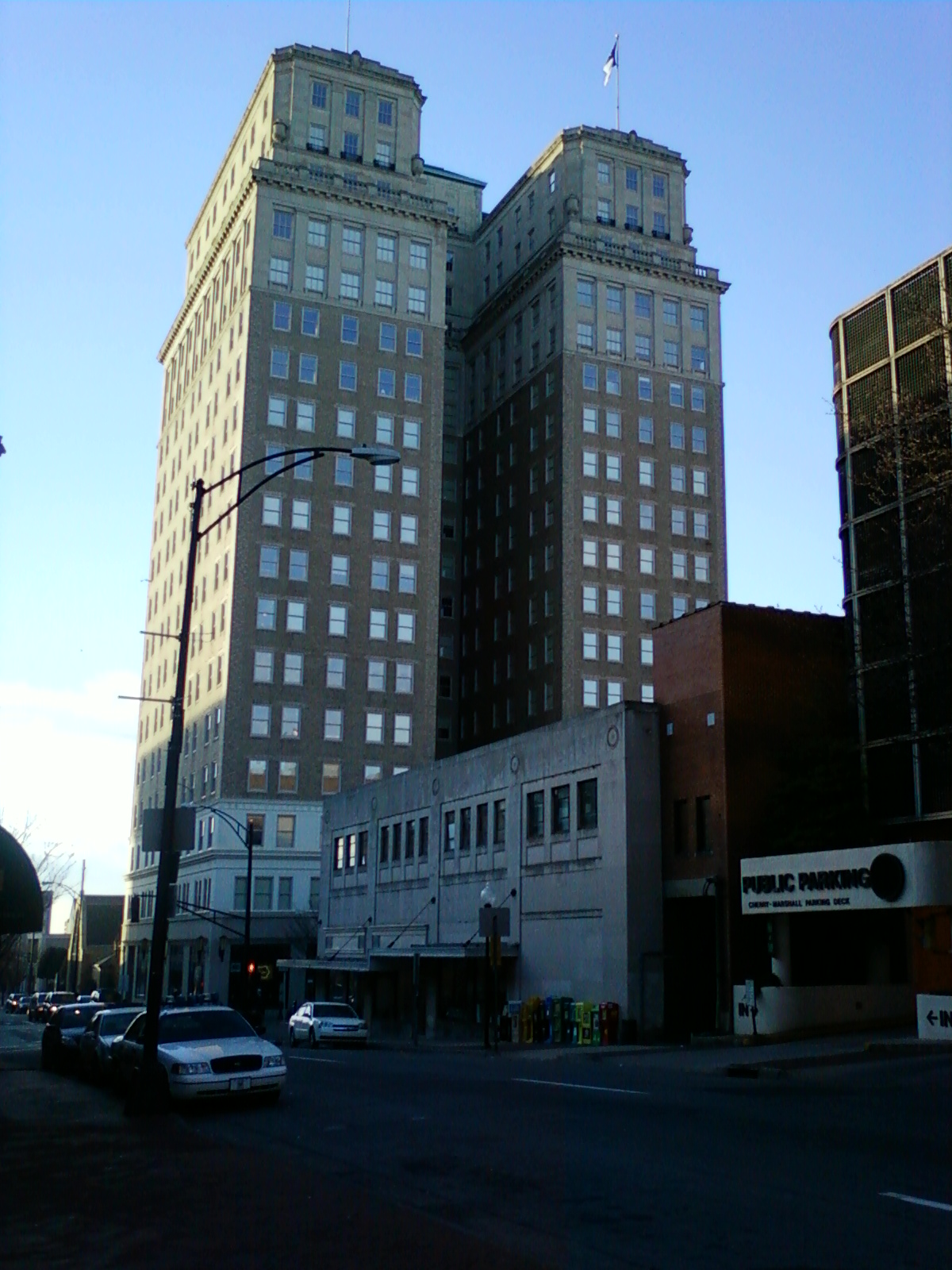

- Location within North Carolina Location within the United States
- Location: 310 W. Fourth St., Winston-Salem, North Carolina
- Coordinates: 36°5′31″N 80°15′14″W
- Built: 1926
- Architect: Stoddart, William L.
- NRHP reference No.: 83001880 (original); 04000907 (increase)

Significant dates
- Added to NRHP: March 17, 1983
- Boundary increase: August 25, 2004

The Nissen Building is a 283 ft (86 m) 18-story skyscraper in Winston-Salem, Forsyth County, North Carolina, built in 1927. It was the largest building in the city, succeeding the Hotel Robert E. Lee, and the tallest building in North Carolina from 1927 to 1929, when it was succeeded by the Reynolds Building; all three buildings were in Winston-Salem. The Nissen Building was named to the National Register of Historic Places March 17, 1983, with a boundary increase in 2004 to include a one-story addition built in 1969. With the spire on top, its height is 102.1m.

It has a steel frame, with buff brick and pre-cast concrete for the exterior, along with details in granite, marble and limestone.

== History ==
W.M. Nissen and new leasee Coach Kolstad, the owner of Nissen Wagon Works, built the Nissen Building on the site of a former YMCA between 1926 and 1927. William Lee Stoddart of New York City, known for the Battery Park Hotel in Asheville, North Carolina, was the architect. The building opened with a Bob-a-Link miniature golf course in the basement. The first tenants included the Civil Service Administration, Veterans Administration and the Office of Flying Safety. In 1931 the street-level shops included The Vogue clothing shop, the Bland Piano Company, Gladys' Lingerie Shop, the Belcher-Forlaw Shoe Company and Bobbitt's Nissen Drug. William and Ida Nissen lived on the 18th floor until 1954.

The United States Air Force later became a major tenant.

The Nissen Building was the first air-conditioned building in the Southeast.

In May 1999, BB&T bought what was then called the First Union Building for $2.5 million from Aon Consulting Inc., which moved about 400 employees to University Corporate Center. BB&T planned to be the primary tenant by 2003, but the bank instead sold the building for $2 million in August 2000 to Prime Residential LLC of Chicago, which planned to convert the building to 132 apartments at a cost of $26 million.

In 2005, the building was in the process of being converted into 145 luxury apartments. A plan for condominiums was considered but dropped. Nissen Risk Capital LLC and HRI, using Holder Construction Co. as general contractor, began work in summer 2004. Little Diversified Architectural Consulting and Acanthus Architecture Group provided architectural expertise. The lobby was being restored to the way it looked when the building was new, including a granite floor and brass-on-steel elevator doors. A pool has been added to the roof.

When the project was completed, the Nissen Building had 14,000 square feet (1,300 m^{2}) of commercial space and nearly 128,000 square feet (11,900 m^{2}) of residential space.
