= RJR Plaza Building =

Building in Winston-Salem, North Carolina

Coordinates: 36.0996°N 80.2436°W

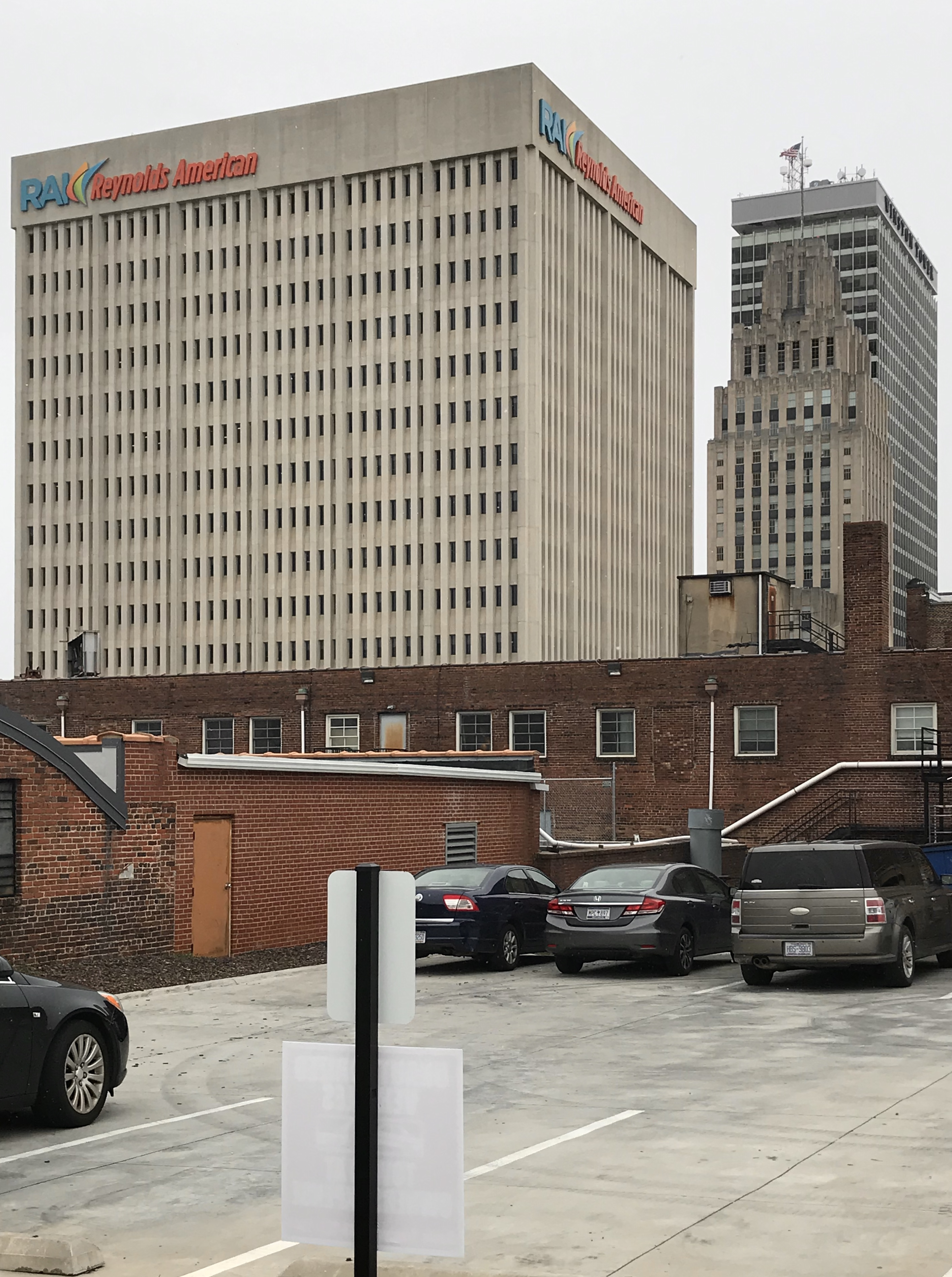
View toward the building

The RJR Plaza Building (also known as the Reynolds American Plaza Building) is a 16-story skyscraper in Winston-Salem, North Carolina which was completed in 1982 for R. J. Reynolds Tobacco Company, currently the second-largest tobacco manufacturer in the United States. In 2009, the RJR Plaza building became the headquarters for both Reynolds Tobacco and its parent company Reynolds American after Reynolds decided in 2008 to vacate its longtime headquarters, the Reynolds Building.

The building, which has 449,150 square feet (41,726 square meters), was first planned in 1969 and would have been a pair of skyscrapers which would have been the tallest in the Southeastern United States. The FAA put an end to this plan.

Hammill-Walter Associates served as the architect. The architectural style is Modernism, with a curtain wall facade and concrete rigid frame construction.

A two-story galleria links this building and the Reynolds Building next door.
