= Marshall McGearty Lounge =

The Marshall McGearty Lounge was established in 2005, in the Wicker Park neighborhood of Chicago, Illinois, by the R.J. Reynolds tobacco company. The company intended it to be the United States' "first upscale, luxury lounge dedicated to the smoking of cigarettes". The lounge specialized in cigarettes "hand-crafted" (not hand-rolled) on the premises.

The lounge closed on January 14, 2008, the "first casualty" of Chicago legislation banning smoking from nearly all establishments, including bars and restaurants, throughout the city. The lounge opened the same week in 2005 that the Chicago City Council passed the anti-smoking ordinance.
