= Vantage (cigarette) =

American cigarette brand

- Product type: Cigarette
- Current owner: R.J. Reynolds
- Produced by: R.J. Reynolds
- Country: United States
- Introduced: November 1970; 56 years ago
- Markets: See Markets
- Tagline: "The new cigarette that doesn't cop out on flavor"

Vantage is an American brand of cigarettes, currently owned and manufactured by the R.J. Reynolds Tobacco Company.

== History ==
Vantage was introduced nationwide in November 1970 in the United States. Vantage is notable for its innovative filter design. Rather than featuring a solid filter like most cigarette brands, Vantage's filter features a conical hole in its center. While seemingly as mysterious as Parliament's recessed filter, Vantage advertising from 1977 states that the reasoning behind the design is to give "smokers the flavor of a full-flavor cigarette without anywhere near the 'tar' or nicotine".

It received its biggest advertising push in the 1970s and '80s but is now categorized as a 'non-support' brand; though R.J. Reynolds will not provide marketing support for Vantage, the company will maintain the brand's distribution where there is consumer demand.

In September 2015, the Food and Drug Administration forbade the selling of 4 brands: Camel Bold Crush, Vantage Tech 13 and the regular and menthol versions of Pall Mall Deep Set Recessed Filter cigarettes because R.J. Reynolds had failed to prove that the cigarettes were no more dangerous than brands that have been on the market longer.

== Advertising ==
R.J. Reynolds has made various poster and magazine ads to promote Vantage in the 1970s and 1980s. A prominent slogan used at the time was "The new cigarette that doesn't cop out on flavor".

A few TV adverts were also made to promote the brand during the early 1970s.

== Sponsorship ==
=== Contests ===
Vantage was the main sponsor of the "Women of Originality" contest held in Canada in 1998 and 1999. Women such as the singer-songwriter Jann Arden, fashion entertainer Jeanne Beker, figure skating choreographer Sandra Bezic and comedian Mary Walsh participated and won a "Vantage Women of Originality Award" on 7 May 1998. A second round was scheduled for June 1999.

== In popular culture ==
=== Films ===
The final punch line of the film Reversal of Fortune comes as Jeremy Irons's Klaus von Bulow purchases "two packs Vantage" at a drug store.

=== Novels ===
Vantage is featured as the heroine's cigarette of choice in Lorrie Moore's short story "Willing" in her collection Birds of America and is seen being stubbed out by a minor character in Donna Tartt's bestselling The Secret History. In chapter 103 of Forever by Pete Hamill, Cormac O'Connor purchases a pack of Vantage, ending nine days of not smoking.

== Markets ==
Vantage is mainly sold in the United States, but also was or still is sold in Canada, Argentina, Spain, Italy, Russia and Lebanon.

== See also ==
- Cigarette
- Tobacco smoking
