= Newport (cigarette) =

American brand of menthol cigarettes

- Product type: Cigarette
- Current owner: R. J. Reynolds
- Country: United States
- Introduced: 1957; 69 years ago
- Markets: See Markets
- Previous owners: Lorillard Tobacco Company
- Website: Official website

Newport is an American brand of cigarettes, currently owned and manufactured by the R. J. Reynolds Tobacco Company. The brand was originally named for the seaport of Newport, Rhode Island.

== History ==
Newport was launched in 1957 by the Lorillard Tobacco Company. The spinnaker present on all packs since the late 1950s is meant to represent its early sailing history, as it is named after a Rhode Island seaport.

In the mid-1980s, Newport began an advertising campaign that targeted African Americans in urban areas. In two years, Newport became the fifth most popular cigarette on the market. Because of this, Newport has gained a commanding share of the African-American market; a 2005 survey stated that 49.5% of all cigarette sales to African-Americans were Newport cigarettes. Newport has been the second best-selling cigarette brand in the United States since 1996, trailing only Altria's Marlboro brand.

A 2004 study by the Robert Wood Johnson Foundation found that the percentage of teen Newport smokers doubled between 1989 and 1996. Researcher Karen Gerlach indicated that Newport made the most significant progress with the Hispanic and White American teen markets in those years. A 1998 Massachusetts Department of Public Health report indicated that Newports, alongside unfiltered Camel cigarettes, contained the highest levels of nicotine in cigarettes on the market. In the following six years, Lorillard Tobacco increased the amount of nicotine in Newport by 10%.

In 2015, the R.J. Reynolds Tobacco Company acquired Newport and the entire Lorillard Tobacco Company for $27.4 billion. Until June 2016, ITG Brands continued to make Newports for Reynolds in the former Lorillard plant in Greensboro, North Carolina.

Newport comprises about 35 percent of menthol cigarette sales in the U.S. It has been the most popular mentholated cigarette brand sold in the United States since 1993.

== Advertisement ==
Lorillard advertised Newport in various ways. TV advertisements were created in the 1960s to promote the brand.

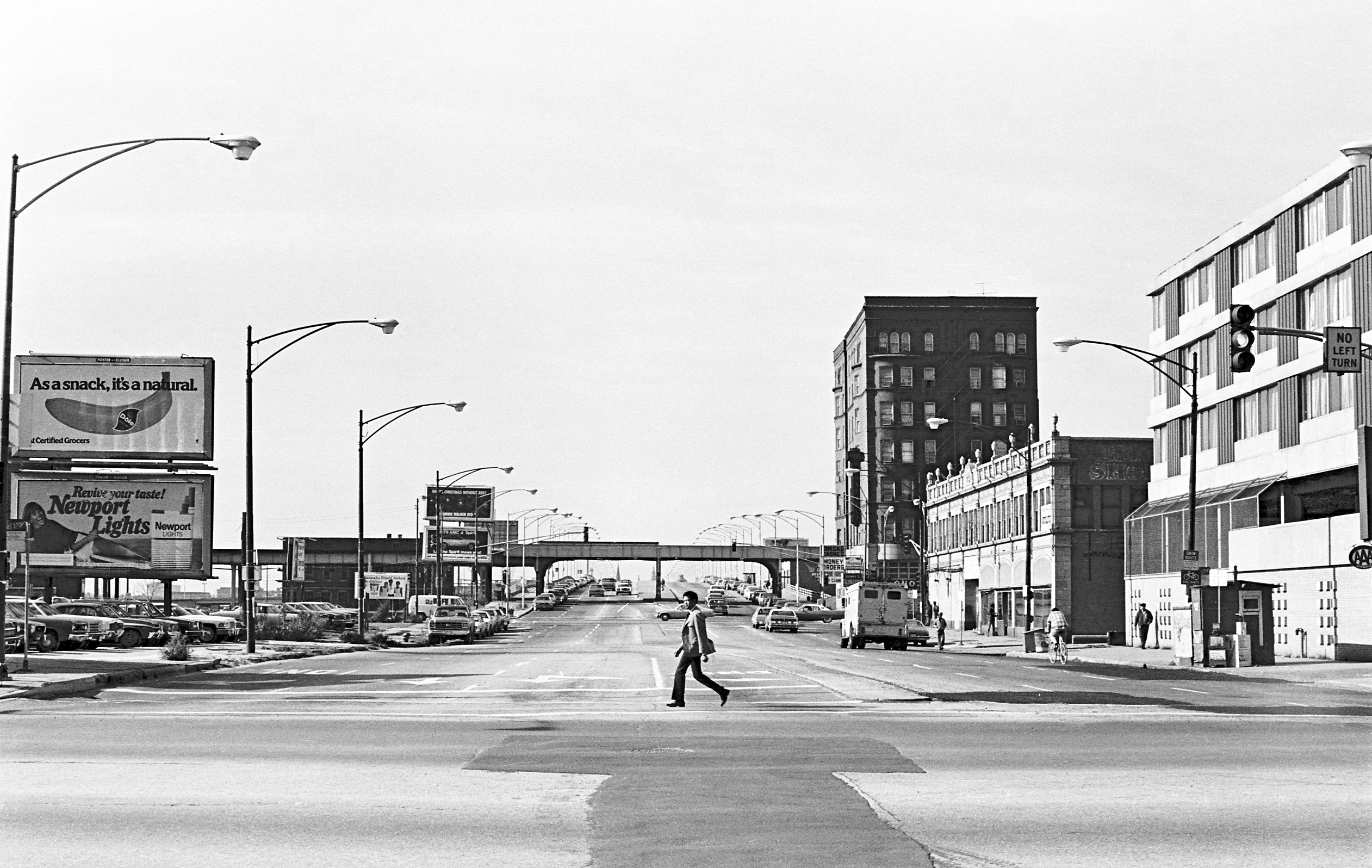
1978 photo of Newport Lights billboard on Roosevelt Road west of Michigan Avenue, Chicago

Once TV advertisements were banned in the United States, Lorillard advertised the brand through poster advertisements. The Newport ads in this theme range from 1980 to present day and feature the "Newport Pleasure" or "Alive with Pleasure" campaign slogans. The latter slogan provides the viewer with a subconscious health claim. Additionally, the pleasure aspect of these campaigns weighs an important part of youth targeting, portraying Newport cigarettes as fun and enjoyable and, subconsciously, sexy and sexual.

== Markets ==
Newport is mainly sold in the United States, except in Massachusetts and California, where menthol cigarettes are banned and only non-mentholated varieties are sold.

== Controversy ==
=== Lorillard handing out free cigarettes to children ===
A lawsuit against the Lorillard Tobacco Company alleged that in the late 1960s, company vans were used to make regular trips to housing projects where free Newport cigarettes were given to children. Evidence showed that the deceased plaintiff died of lung cancer, but that she started smoking at age nine after receiving free Newport cigarettes near a playground in a majority-Black Boston neighborhood. The Massachusetts Supreme Judicial Court upheld $35 million of damages against Lorillard Tobacco Company while reversing other issues of damages.

=== Newport and targeting of African-Americans ===
In the 1960s, Lorillard specifically targeted African Americans to sell Newport cigarettes.

Lorillard increased its African American market budget by 87% over 1968 due to increased efforts marketing its menthol cigarette, Newport, to the African American market. Government surveys in 2011 revealed that menthol cigarettes dominated 30% of the overall market, and over 80% of Black smokers prefer menthol as opposed to 22% of non-Hispanic white smokers. In 2016, it was reported that Newport was the brand of choice for nearly 60% of Black smokers.

=== Newport and targeting teenagers ===
In September 2016, it was reported that R.J. Reynolds was specifically targeting Black teenagers and young adults to sell Newport cigarettes.

Reynolds American Inc., the parent firm that owns Newport, was pushing the brand on people in their 20s — with pop-ups at music festivals like Las Vegas' Electric Daisy Carnival, a notorious destination for teen-partiers, which was recently pressured to raise its age requirements. Dubbed "Newport Pleasure Lounges", the air-conditioned party trucks were replete with games like digital darts. Newport cigarettes could be purchased in these lounges for $1 per pack. Reynolds had set aside $50 million for such initiatives in 2016.

A study from the Stanford University School of Medicine had discovered that menthol cigarette manufacturers created very direct marketing campaigns designed to attract young Black smokers. Far from being a catchall effort, Reuters says these campaigns were concerted attacks on African-American teens: "A recent analysis of the data found school neighborhoods were increasingly likely to have lower prices and more advertising for Newport cigarettes as the proportion of African-American students rose. The same was true of neighborhoods with higher proportions of children aged 10 to 17."

=== Newport, Nike, and plagiarism ===
In May 2010, a report was written where the popular sport shoe company Nike copied the Swoosh logo from Newport. The comparison was made, because Newport was introduced in 1957 and used a logo they call the "spinnaker", while Nike was formed on January 25, 1964, as Blue Ribbon Sports by Bill Bowerman and Philip Knight, and officially became Nike, Inc. in 1978. The Nike swoosh is a logo design created in 1971 by Carolyn Davidson, over a decade after Newport cigarettes were launched.

Despite some claims, no specific evidence has ever been found that Nike stole the logo from Newport.

In 2006, Lorillard and Nike sued graphic designer Ari Saal Forman after he released his Ari Menthol 10s shoes, which combined the design of the Nike Air Force 1 with Newport's spinnaker and colors. According to Forman, the shoes were "dedicated to the two brands who have taken the most and given the least." As a result of the lawsuit, Forman is prohibited from owning a pair of Menthol 10s.

== Varieties ==
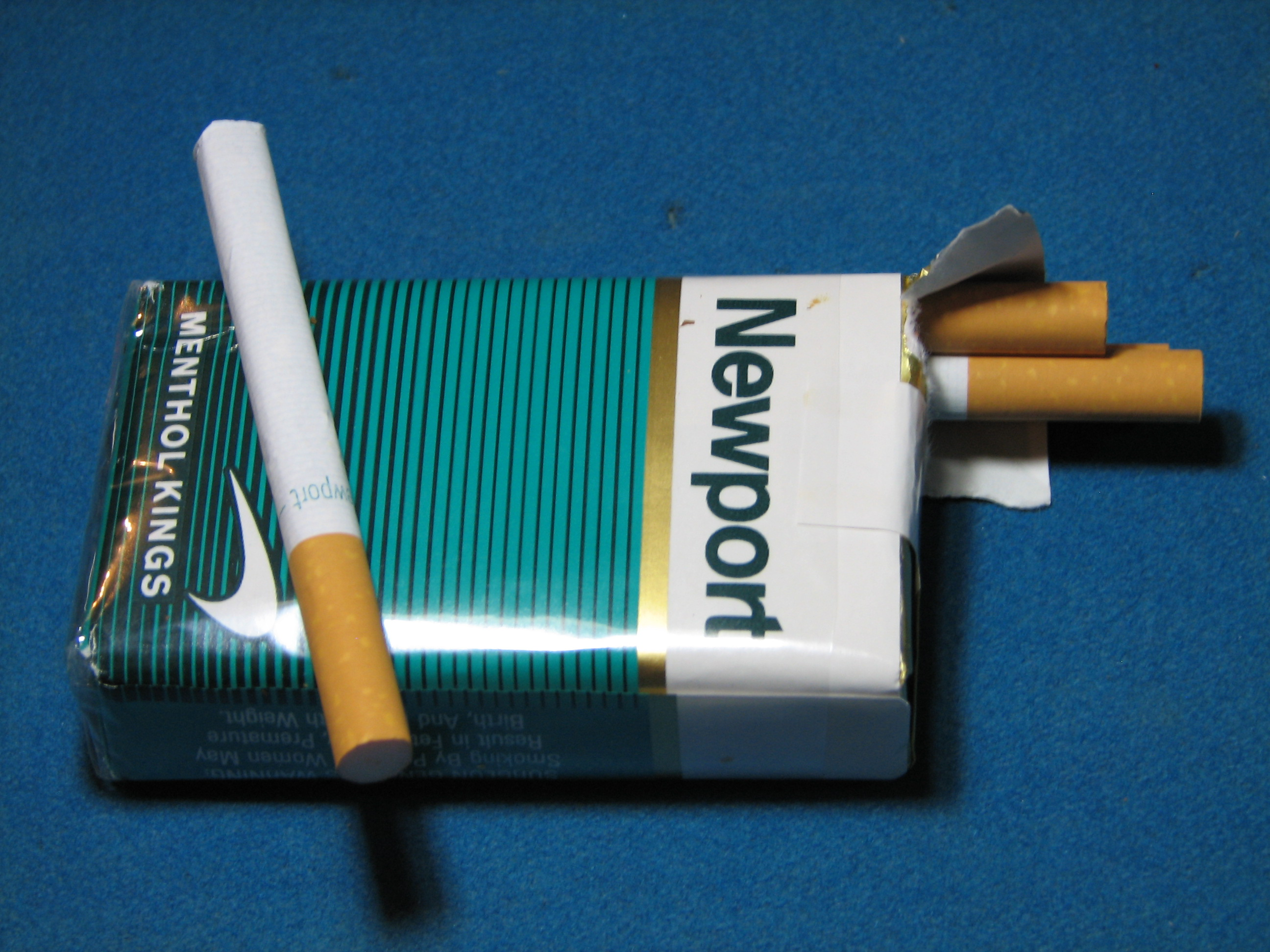
A soft pack of Newport Menthol cigarettes

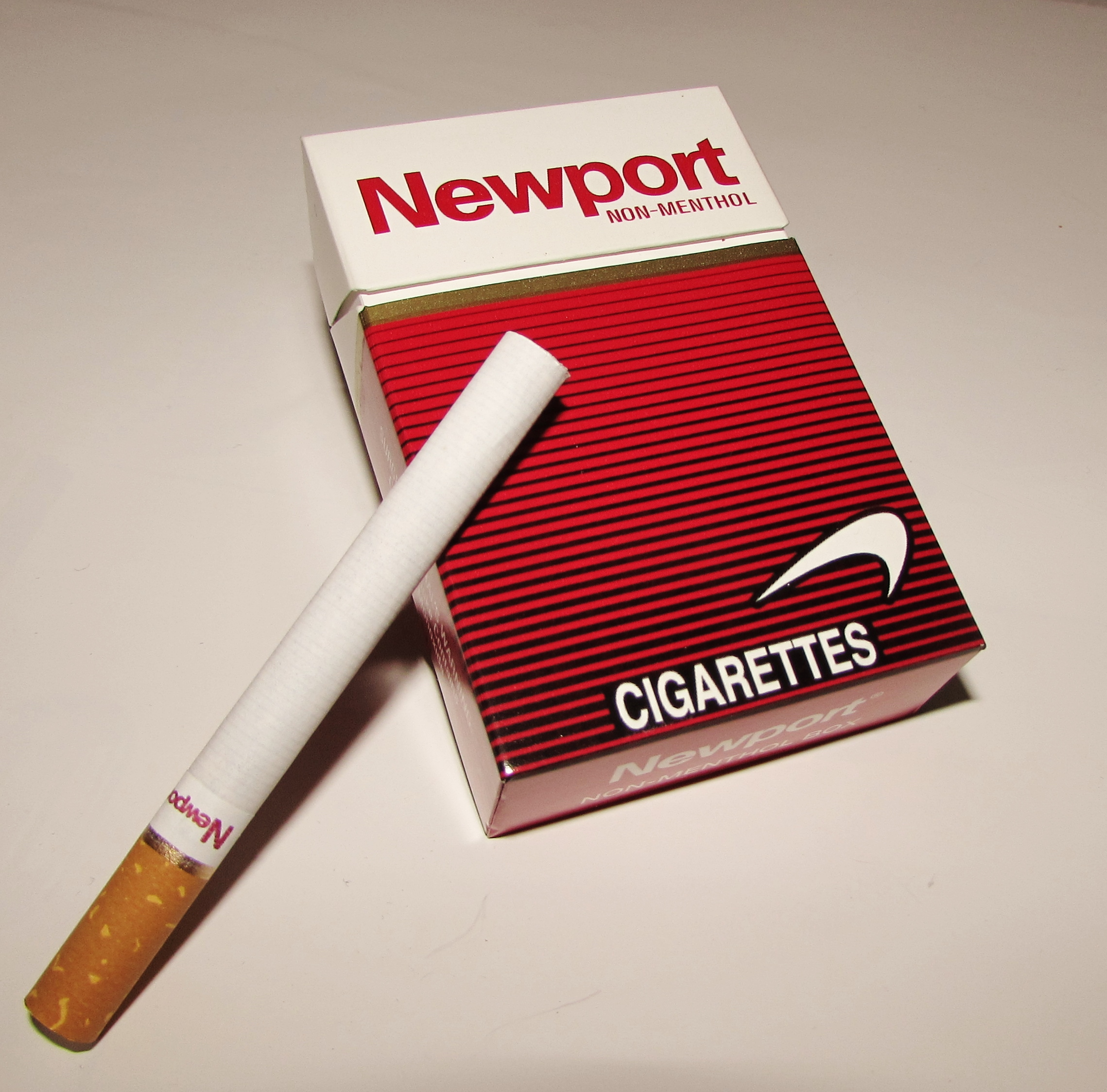
A pack of Newport Non-Menthol (Red), king size box

Newport cigarettes come in several varieties: Full Flavor, Medium, and Lights. In the United States, in June 2010, "Medium" and "Lights" were re-branded into "Blue" and "Gold" respectively. On the box, the words "Menthol Box" for shorts and "Menthol Box 100s" for 100s were replaced simply with "Cigarettes." Each variety is sold in 85mm soft packs (king size), 80mm hard packs (box), and 100mm soft and hard packs. They are available in standard packs of 20 cigarettes, as well as the more unusual 25s, containing 25 cigarettes. Prior to the signing of the Tobacco Master Settlement Agreement in the late 1990s, they were sold in packs of ten as well.

Due to the FDA Tobacco Regulations, the terms "Full Flavor," "Medium," "Light," "Mild" and "Ultra-Light" have been discontinued. New names for Newport Cigarettes are as follows:

- Newport Box (Full Flavor) & Soft Pack Kings
- Newport Box 100s (Full Flavor 100s) & Soft Pack 100s
- Newport Smooth Select (Full Flavor)
- Newport Smooth Select 100s (Full Flavor 100s)
- Newport Menthol Blue (Medium)
- Newport Menthol Blue 100s (Medium 100s)
- Newport Menthol Gold (Light) & Menthol Gold Soft Pack Kings
- Newport Menthol Gold 100s (Light 100s) & Menthol Gold Soft Pack 100s
- Newport Non-Menthol
- Newport Non-Menthol 100s
- Newport Non-Menthol Gold
- Newport Non-Menthol Gold 100s
- Newport Platinum Blue
- Newport Platinum Blue 100s
- Newport Platinum Silver
- Newport Platinum Silver 100s

Non-menthol Newport in Full Flavor and Lights were sold in United States during the mid- to late 1990s, possibly as late as 2002; however, they were discontinued until November 2010 in which they re-released them in order to keep up with the non-menthol cigarette smokers in America. The packs are identical in design to standard menthol Newports except the turquoise-colored area is red on the Full Flavors and mustard-yellow on the Lights. Newport Slim 120s (introduced 1998), Newport "Stripes" and Newport "M-Blend" were other varieties that have also been discontinued.

In some Latin American markets, such as tourist areas of the Dominican Republic, British American Tobacco has released some limited edition varieties and outer packaging's including:

- Newport Silver (menthol ultra-lights)
- Newport Freezing Point (10 & 20 count boxes)
- Newport Midnight Blast

In July 2017, R.J. Reynolds announced they would introduce new flavors called Newport Platinum. It would be released in two variants: Newport Platinum (King Size and 100s) and Newport Platinum Blue (also King Size and 100s).

== See also ==
- Kool
- List of additives in cigarettes
- List of cigarette smoke constituents
- Menthol cigarette
- Tobacco smoking
- Lung cancer
- Health effects of tobacco
