= Pall Mall (cigarette) =

British brand of cigarettes

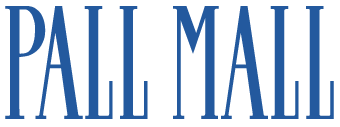
- Product type: Cigarette
- Current owner: British American Tobacco
- Produced by: British American Tobacco
- Country: United Kingdom
- Introduced: 1899; 127 years ago
- Previous owners: Black Butler Company
- Website: pallmallusa.com

Pall Mall (/ˌpɛlˈmɛl/, /ˌpælˈmæl/ or adopted/ˌpɔːlˈmɔːl/) is a British brand of cigarettes produced by British American Tobacco. The brand takes its name from Pall Mall, London, a street in the St James's area of London. It was introduced in 1899 by the Black Butler Company (UK) and acquired by the American Tobacco Company in 1907. Pall Mall reached the height of its popularity in 1960, when it was the number one cigarette brand in the United States. In 1994, it was acquired by Brown & Williamson Tobacco Corporation, which subsequently merged with R. J. Reynolds Tobacco Company in 2004. Outside the United States, Pall Mall is manufactured and sold by British American Tobacco, for whom it is one of four drive brands.

== History ==
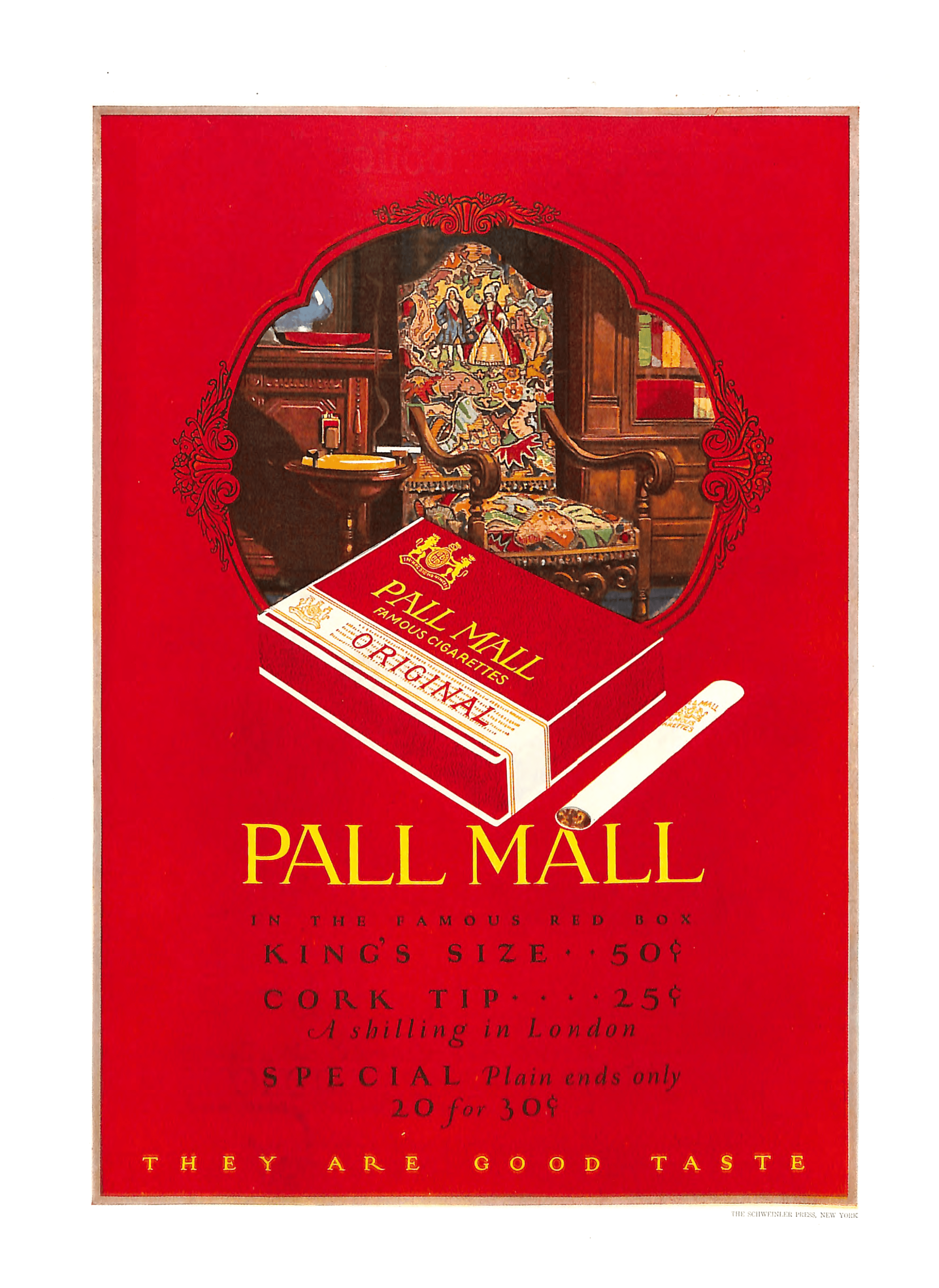
Pall Mall ad from The Elks Magazine, 1925

The Pall Mall brand was introduced in 1899 by the Black Butler Company (UK), marketed towards upper-class consumers as a higher-end cigarette product. It is named after Pall Mall, a well-known street in the St James's area of London, containing several of the private clubs which such people patronized.

In 1907, Pall Mall was acquired by the American Tobacco Company with the sale of Butler & Butler. The new owners used the premium brand to test innovations in cigarette design, such as, in 1939, the "king-size" (now the standard size for cigarettes at 85 mm, although today that includes the filter length), and a new way of stuffing tobacco that supposedly made cigarettes easier on the throat.

Pall Mall reached the height of its popularity in 1960 when it was the number one brand of cigarette in America. The company introduced "longs", 100 mm long cigarettes, in 1966. It was edged out in 1966 by Winston cigarettes, when Pall Mall found that it could no longer compete with the advertising campaign "Winston tastes good like a cigarette should." In the 1940s, Pall Mall had its own grammatically incorrect slogan which touted it as the cigarette which "travels the smoke further", referring to the longer 85 mm length. Their slogan during the '50s and early '60s was "OUTSTANDING...and they are MILD!"

In 1994, Pall Mall and Lucky Strike were purchased by Brown & Williamson Tobacco Corporation as the former American Tobacco company shed its tobacco brands. In 2001 Pall Mall was re-branded as a savings brand, and introduced several varieties of filtered cigarettes. Brown & Williamson merged with R. J. Reynolds Tobacco Company on July 30, 2004, with the surviving company taking the name of the latter. Reynolds continues to make unfiltered and filtered styles of Pall Mall for the U.S. market, emphasizing the latter. British American Tobacco makes and sells Pall Mall outside the U.S.

Pall Mall currently is in the "Growth Brand" segment of the R. J. Reynolds brand portfolio. Within British American Tobacco, Pall Mall is one of their four drive brands. During the Great Recession, Pall Mall was marketed as a "premium product at a sub-premium price"; its market share grew from 1.95 percent with a 1.6 billion quarterly volume in 2006 to 7.95 percent and 5.5 billion in the third quarter of 2010.

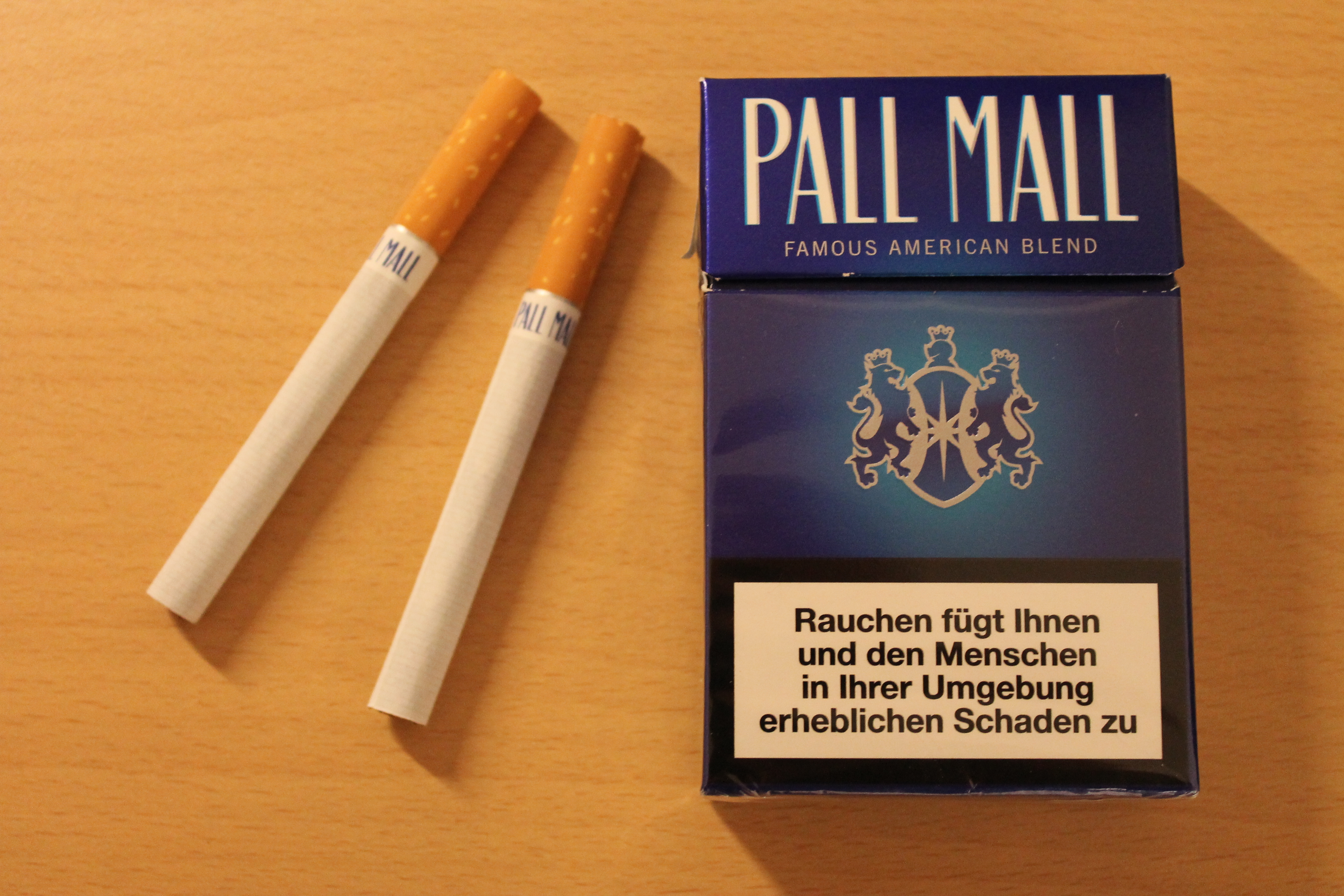
German or Austrian Pall Mall packet with warning message: "Smoking severely harms you and the people around you", 2013

Pall Mall is now Reynolds' most popular cigarette, along with Newport and Camel. In October 2012, Reynolds debuted two new versions of its menthol cigarette, Pall Mall Black, described as "full flavor", and Pall Mall White, called "smoother". The traditional menthol style is called Pall Mall Green.

== Logo ==
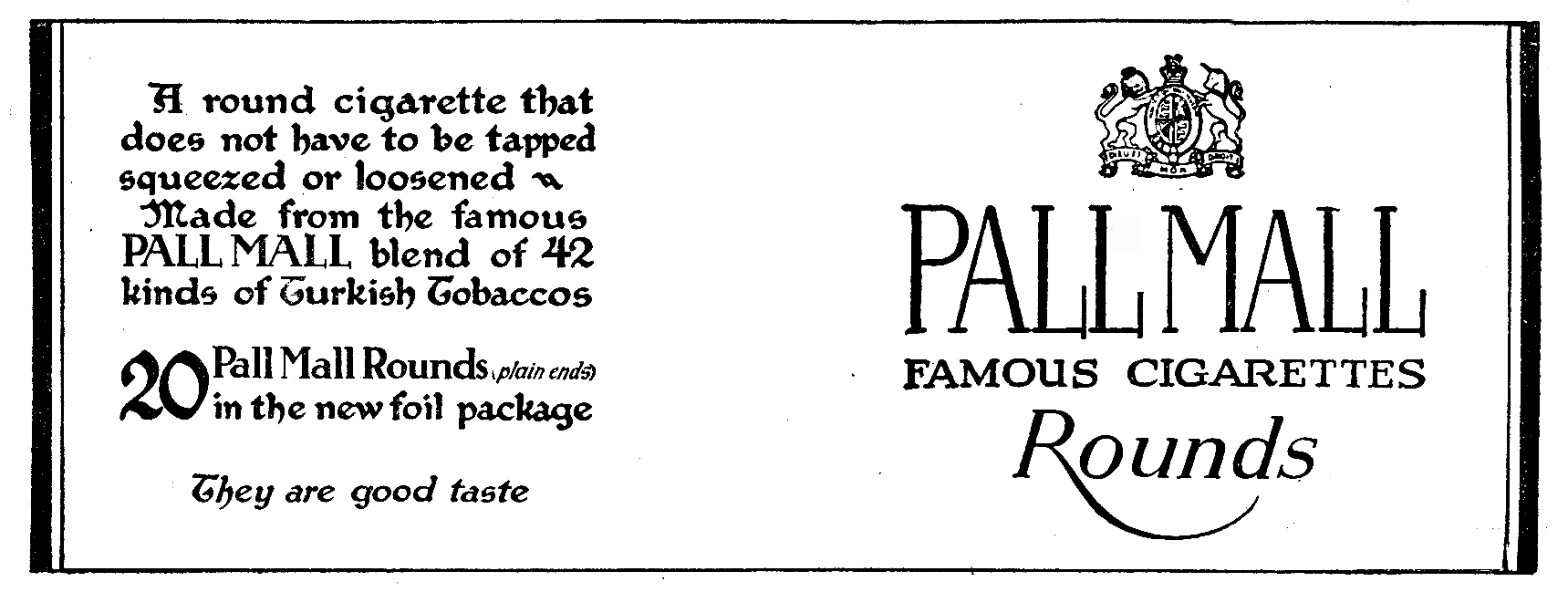
Pall Mall logo on a Metropolitan Opera House program, 1922

The Pall Mall logo features large Art Nouveau lettering spelling out "Pall Mall" on the top front of the red pack. On the front and back of the package is a white coat of arms depicting two lions pawing the sides and a knight's helmet on top. A banner underneath the shield bears the Latin phrase "In hoc signo vinces" ("By this sign shall you conquer"). The Pall Mall slogan, "Wherever Particular People Congregate", appears beneath the coat of arms.

In 2007, R. J. Reynolds Tobacco Company changed the packaging color of Pall Mall Ultra Lights from light blue to orange to stop confusion between the Ultra Lights and the Lights. Both had been in blue colored packaging.

In 2009, R. J. Reynolds Tobacco Company changed the flavor descriptors of all the Pall Mall brand hard packs to color designations. The descriptor change occurred because the FDA banned product descriptors such as "Light," "Ultra Light" and "Mild" in 2010. Along with the change in descriptors, the rings and branding on the cigarettes have changed to match both the color of the box and the Pall Mall lettering on the filter for that particular descriptor. The soft packs are still sold with the traditional style packaging and design.

In 2015, the FDA required that two varieties of Pall Mall be removed from stores, Deep Set Recessed Filter (blue) and Deep Set Recessed Filter Menthol, as well as Camel Crush Bold and Vantage Tech 13.

== Pronunciation ==
During the era of cigarette advertising on television and radio, the American pronunciation of the brand was /ˌpɛlˈmɛl/. However, after the Public Health Cigarette Smoking Act banned cigarette advertising, the American pronunciation shifted to /ˌpælˈmæl/, which is the pronunciation of the street in London of that name and has always also been used for the cigarettes by smokers from the United Kingdom. Older smokers in the U.S. who heard the commercials often still use the older pronunciation.

== Sponsorships ==
Pall Mall sponsored the radio shows Ripley's Believe It or Not in the 1940s and The Big Story in the 1940s and 1950s.

The brand was the sponsor of M Squad, a television program which ran on NBC during the late 1950s. Lee Marvin, the show's star, appeared on its commercials during the episodes. It was an alternating sponsor of MGM Parade in the 1955–56 season. Despite the ban on cigarette ads on TV that went into effect on January 2, 1971, Pall Mall ads from the show are seen on Turner Classic Movies intact.

== Cultural references ==
- Kurt Vonnegut, who was a Pall Mall smoker, mentioned the brand in several of his novels. Kurt Vonnegut once said that smoking was "a classy way to commit suicide". In the introduction to his book Welcome to the Monkey House: The Special Edition, Vonnegut said "My brand is Pall Mall. The authentic suicides ask for Pall Malls. The dilettantes ask for Pell Mells."
- In the film Badlands (1973), Kit (Martin Sheen) is surprised to realize that Holly (Sissy Spacek) smokes Pall Malls, pronouncing it "Pell Mells".

== See also ==
- Tobacco smoking
- Lung cancer
