= Cambridge (cigarette) =

Cigarette Brand

- Product type: Cigarette
- Current owner: Altria
- Produced by: Philip Morris International
- Introduced: 1970; 56 years ago
- Markets: See Markets
- Previous owners: Rothmans International
- Tagline: "Everyone's swinging to Cambridge".

Cambridge is a brand of cigarettes, currently owned by the conglomerate Altria, and manufactured by Philip Morris International (with a few exceptions in the U.S., where Philip Morris USA takes over production). In the U.K., Cambridge was manufactured by Rothmans International up until 1999.

== History ==
Cambridge was launched in 1970 by Philip Morris. The reference incorrectly states 1870.

In December 1981, the United Press International reported that the safest cigarettes in terms of tar, nicotine and carbon monoxide were "Cambridge Filters", "Carlton Filters" and "Now 100s Filters". All three brands emerged from the Federal Trade Commission tests with less than 0.5 milligrams of tar, less than 0.05 milligrams of nicotine and less than 0.5 milligrams of carbon monoxide. The same conclusion was drawn in March 1984, when The New York Times published a report.

In the 1990s, the brand was discontinued in most countries (such as Australia and New Zealand) due to poor sales. It is still sold in some countries, including the United States.

== Advertisement ==
In 1969, English Australian radio announcer Tony Barber was sponsored to promote the brand on the radio in Australia. He would hold a competition where, if someone would correctly whistle the first few bars of the "Cambridge Song", the person would win a prize. The slogan used in the advert was "Everyone's swinging to Cambridge".

In the 1970s, Cambridge cigarettes were the first cigarette brand to give out Green Shield Stamps to their customers in the United Kingdom.

A few poster adverts were made by Philip Morris USA to promote the brand as being a "low tar" cigarette in the 1980s in the United States.

In 1969, Cambridge sponsored the "Cambridge Racing Team" in the "New Zealand Saloon Car Championship". The drivers were Red Coppins and Spinner Black and they drove the Holden Monaro and the Chevrolet Camaro.

== Markets ==
Cambridge cigarettes were or still are sold in the following countries: United States, Argentina, United Kingdom, The Netherlands, Malaysia, Australia and New Zealand.
