= Next (cigarette) =

Brand of cigarettes

- Greek pack of Next cigarettes
- Product type: Cigarette
- Current owner: Philip Morris International
- Produced by: Philip Morris International
- Introduced: 1989; 37 years ago
- Discontinued: 1989, re-introduced in 2003
- Markets: See Markets
- Previous owners: Philip Morris USA

Next is a brand of cigarettes, owned and manufactured by Philip Morris International. The original acronym for Next was a reference to "nicotine extracted".

== History ==
The brand was launched in 1981 by Philip Morris USA as a "low-nicotine" brand in the United States which the company dubbed as "de-nic". The company claimed that Next was better than other low-nicotine varieties because its taste was indistinguishable from regular cigarettes. The nicotine was removed from the cigarettes using high-pressure carbon dioxide in a process similar to the method used by coffee companies when making decaffeinated coffee. Test marketing began in July 1989, around the time of the release of the Surgeon General's report on nicotine addiction, in three markets (Omaha, Hartford and Toledo). Philip Morris USA spent tens of millions of dollars developing the product, but it never received any credible third-party endorsement. Instead, public health groups criticised the product because it actually had higher tar levels than many other cigarette brands, and because heavy smokers would simply smoke more Next cigarettes to give their bodies the nicotine they crave. They also petitioned the Food and Drug Administration to regulate it as a drug delivery device.

The brand was a marketing failure once the test results proved to be disappointing with poor sales (less than 0.2 market share) and Philip Morris stopped producing them in late 1989.

Additional test marketing of Next was conducted by Philip Morris in Tampa in May 1990, but the results were still poor and the product was withdrawn from the market once again.

The brand was eventually re-launched after tax increases of tobacco in Malaysia pushed Marlboro out of the market. Next is also available in tobacco for rolling use.

Next International is sold in Canada as a discount cigarette brand which competes with other imported brands such as Viceroy, Legend, Studio and Pall Mall.

== Controversy ==
=== Fraudulent practices in Morocco ===
In May 2015, the Moroccan Tobacco Company (formerly Imperial Tobacco) was accused of committing fraudulent acts by mixing both blonde and brown tobacco and selling it as 100% dark tobacco. According to the international definition, brown cigarettes must be at least 60% brown tobacco, but in Morocco, there is no standard for tobacco mixtures. To counter cheating, some distributors demand the standardization of taxation of blond and brown tobacco.

The Emirati-Morocco for Industry and Distribution had launched the marketing of Next cigarettes at 15 dirhams. Produced by the American Philip Morris company, the tobacco brand was approved more than a year and a half before by the Moroccan Tobacco Company, which never marketed it. What sparked industry outrage was that Next was suspected of being officially listed as brown tobacco, hence the very low price, but the product that was just launched at the point of sale advertising was rather a blend between brown and blond tobacco. This would not be consistent with what was approved by the Tobacco Control Board. Laboratory analyzes were also underway to determine the true composition of Next cigarettes, with the suspicion of a strong predominance of blond tobacco. The Probate Commission, which was made up of the Ministries of Trade and Industry, Health, Agriculture and Finance, was called in to make its own investigation and react to that.

For the introduction on the Moroccan market of Next, premium brand of brown tobacco, the distributor had chosen the southern regions of Casablanca, including Kelaâ Sraghna, Marrakesh, areas known for the preference of Value For Money (low cost) cigarettes. The distribution of the new brand was gradually being rolled out all over the country.

Contacted by L'Économiste, Philip Morris rejected any accusation. "The product we market is in line with what has been approved by the Commission. It is indeed a brown tobacco as authorized," said the tobacco giant, which recalled that most tobacco companies use tobacco blends to personalize a product and that this is a widespread trend for all operators. The controversy intensified a week before the publication of a new list of cigarettes in the Official Bulletin, provided by the law in early June of each year.

== Markets ==
Next was or still is sold in Canada, United States, Costa Rica, Colombia, Brazil, Argentina, Luxembourg, Belgium, Sweden, Germany, Austria, Spain, Poland, Czech Republic, Slovakia, Bulgaria, Greece, Estonia, Lithuania, Ukraine, Russia, Morocco, Israel, Pakistan, Taiwan and Hong Kong.

== See also ==
- Tobacco smoking
