= Michael A. Miles =

American businessman

Michael A. Miles (1940–2013) was an American marketer and businessman from Washington, D.C., who was chief executive of Kentucky Fried Chicken, Kraft Foods, and Philip Morris Companies, and director of Time Warner, Sears Holdings Corporation, Dell Inc., AMR Corporation, and Citadel Broadcasting Corporation. From 1961 to 1971 he was an advertising executive at Leo Burnett Co. He was also a trustee of Northwestern University. He died on November 10, 2013, from complications of a brain tumor.

== Education ==
Miles attended Woodrow Wilson high school in Washington, D.C., and Northwestern University, where he was president of the Phi Kappa Psi fraternity. He graduated in 1961, with a degree in advertising and journalism from the Medill School of Journalism.

== Business career ==
Miles began his career at Leo Burnett & Co. in 1961 as a Media analyst, and progressed to the position of VP Account Supervisor. In 1972, he was hired by Kentucky Fried Chicken as VP of Marketing, then held various roles at Heublein before being appointed President of the Kentucky Fried Chicken in 1977. Through a re-evaluation of corporate strategy and a new marketing campaign declaring "We Do Chicken Right", Miles sparked a turnaround of the struggling KFC, repairing the company's relationship with founder Colonel Harland Sanders and restoring trust with franchisees. He is in large part responsible for the company's large market share today.

In 1983, Mr. Miles was hired away from KFC by Dart & Kraft Co., where he became president and chief executive in 1985. He helped to orchestrate the $13 billion merger of Philip Morris and Kraft in 1988, at the time one of the largest merger deals in history. He became chairman and CEO of the two companies in 1991, and was notably the first non-smoking chief executive of a major tobacco company. At Kraft, Miles became well known for his mentorship of up-and-coming managers, and established a development program called the "Leadership Corridor," featured in the Harvard Business Review, which fostered current executives of companies including Gillette, CVS, and Sears Roebuck, among multiple others. In 1993, his decision as CEO of Philip Morris to cut the price of Marlboro cigarettes by 20% resulted in the so-called Marlboro Friday stock plunge, as consumers feared the decline of big name brands.

=== Boards of directors ===
Following his executive career, Miles was a director on the board of numerous Fortune 500 companies, including Dell, Time Warner, Sears, Morgan Stanley, and American Airlines. As a director, he was known for his pragmatic, no-nonsense business approach and his decisive nature.

== Personal life ==
Miles met his wife, Pamela, while they were both undergraduates at Northwestern University. They enjoyed 52 years of marriage, and have two sons, Michael and Christopher.
