= Lark (cigarette) =

American cigarette brand

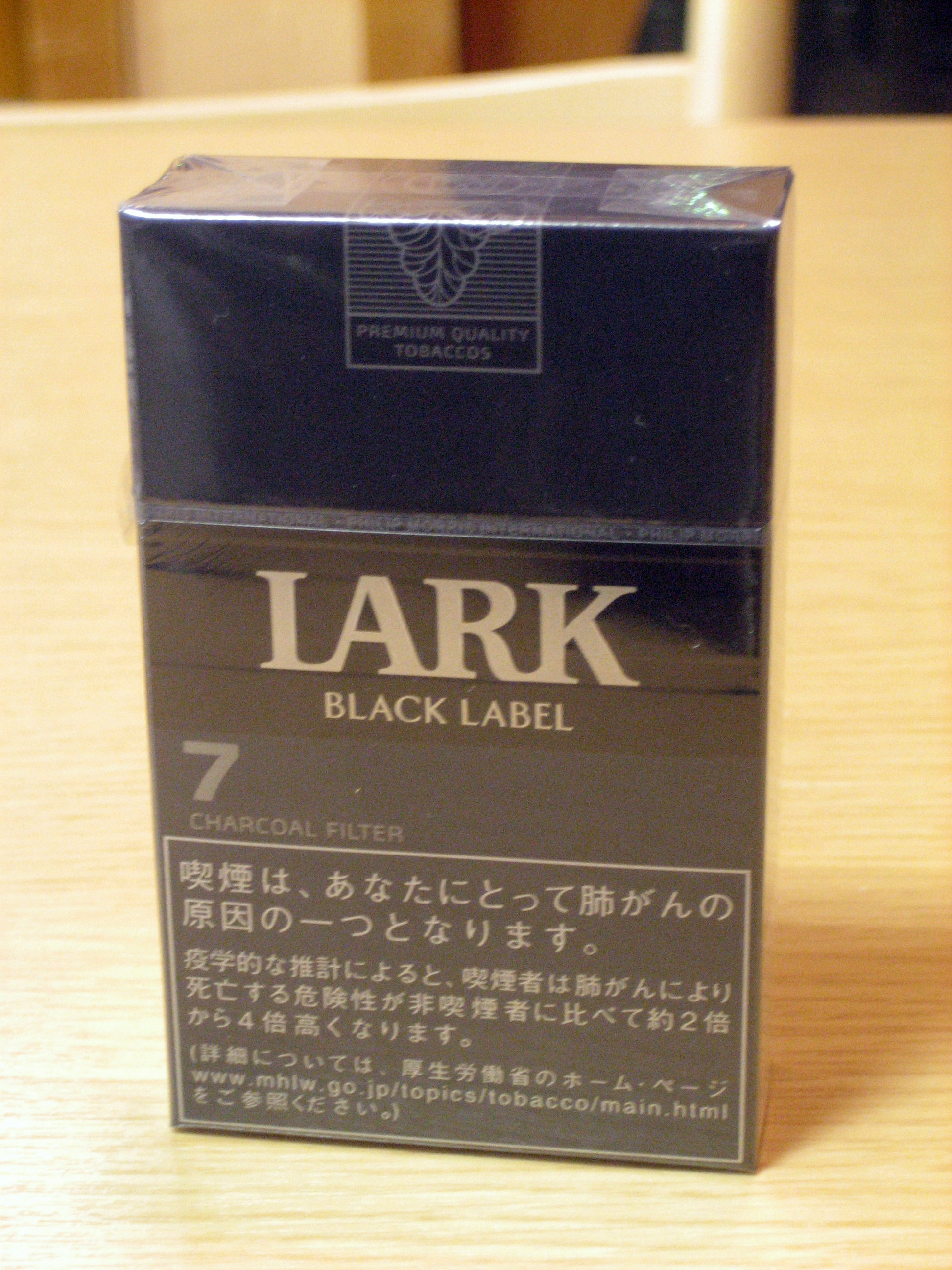
- Pack of Japanese Lark Black Label
- Product type: Cigarette
- Current owner: Altria
- Produced by: Philip Morris International
- Country: United States
- Introduced: 1963; 63 years ago
- Discontinued: February 8, 2022 (United States)
- Markets: See Markets
- Previous owners: Liggett & Myers
- Tagline: "Richly Rewarding, yet Uncommonly Smooth"

Lark is an American brand of cigarettes, owned by Altria Group, and manufactured by Philip Morris USA in the United States and Philip Morris International for the rest of the world.

== History ==
Introduced by Liggett & Myers in 1963, and notable for its charcoal filter and past advertising campaigns, Lark was launched in 1963 by Liggett & Myers with its trademark charcoal filter in an effort to halt a five-year downward drift in sales. The distinguishing feature of the brand, both in terms of physical characteristics and taste was the 3-piece "Keith" filter (named for Dr. Charles H. Keith, "Supervisor of Physical Chemistry" for Liggett & Myers, who developed it)- the middle section of which contains small charcoal granules, which purportedly reduces the harshness of the cigarette's smoke.

Liggett & Myers underwent several name changes over the years but kept the Lark brand in their product mix until 1999, when Liggett Vector Brands Inc. sold Lark, along with the L&M and Chesterfield brands for $300 million to Philip Morris Companies Inc., later known as Altria. (The sale involved only domestic rights; Philip Morris already owned the international rights to the three brands, which it had purchased in the late 1970s.)

Since its introduction and despite several prominent advertising campaigns, among which was one featuring people on the street being asked to "Show us your Lark pack", Lark has never held a large share of the U.S. cigarette market. As of 2008, the brand had less than 1% of the U.S. market share, but was extremely popular in Japan. U.S. Supreme Court Justice John Marshall Harlan II smoked Larks. Comedian George Carlin parodied the "Show us your lark" ad on the album AM & FM (1972).

== Advertising history ==
From its introduction in 1963, the brand came in a maroon-colored package with white print (the trademark shield was initially white but was soon changed to gold along with some of the other graphics); for most of the brand's life it has sported the slogan "Richly Rewarding, yet Uncommonly Smooth".

Although Philip Morris continues to promote the brand heavily in Japan, it receives little to no advertising in the United States. This would explain why its share of the U.S. market has declined over the years since experts generally agree that cigarette brands usually lose market share when they are no longer promoted.

Past advertising campaigns, however, have been conspicuous. Much of the advertising, particularly that in print, centered on the charcoal filter and its effect on taste. The most extensively run and best remembered advertisement, however, was a television spot from the 1960s in which an off-screen narrator exhorted those on the street to "show us your Lark pack". Meanwhile, throughout the piece the William Tell Overture blared while the words "have a Lark, have a Lark, have a Lark today" were sung to the overture's melody. Everyone it seemed had a pack of Larks and was only too happy to show them.

Another notable advertisement campaign from the early 1970s featured a hot-air balloon with the Lark brand name and colours. The balloon was a symbol for the "smoothness" of Lark cigarettes.

Lark was also advertised in the 1980s with James Bond style appearances by Timothy Dalton and Roger Moore in Japanese TV commercials. Future Bond Pierce Brosnan also advertised Larks in two commercials that aired only in Japan. In the late 1980s, Philip Morris allegedly spent $350,000 to have the Lark brand appear in the Licence to Kill film.

=== Parodies ===
- On George Carlin's album FM & AM, Carlin insinuates that "Show us your Lark" is a hidden sexual innuendo; he remarks, "Don't try that Lark thing in the Bowery; those guys will show you their Larks, man."
- A parody of the commercial was created by comedian Stan Freberg for Jeno's Pizza Rolls. In it, tuxedo-clad partygoers are asked to show their packages of frozen Jeno's Pizza Rolls and they do. Ultimately a Lark executive (Barney Phillips) complains about the use of the music followed by the appearance of the Lone Ranger and Tonto asking the Lark executive about the same thing.
- A similar parody was presented in a fake commercial for Saturday Night Live during its first season, where the announcer urged everyone to "show us your guns", in a similar manner as the Lark commercial, minus the singing. The parody first aired on SNL's first episode on October 11, 1975.

== Markets ==
Lark is sold in Brazil, Germany, Spain, Italy, Turkey, Kazakhstan, Taiwan, South Korea, Ecuador and Japan.

== Controversy ==
=== Charcoal filter and health concerns ===
Because of its unique activated charcoal filter, from its inception Lark has been the subject of inquiry into whether it is safer or more harmful than cigarettes in general.

According to Anne Landman with the American Lung Association of Colorado, "The technique used in the marketing of Lark through hospitals and the medical profession was exactly similar to that used in the marketing of Kent in 1952." Ms. Landman's research, which began in 1998, further reveals that Liggett & Myers' marketing campaign several months before the release of the Surgeon General's 1964 Report on Smoking and Health was directed at creating the rumor that medical scientists endorsed Lark as the safest cigarette. This marketing technique is credited for Lark's sales surpassing those of Kent in the Buffalo area and nearly doing so in the Houston area.

Perhaps the biggest controversy about the reputed safety of Lark cigarettes was created by the publication of It Is Safe to Smoke by science writer Lloyd Mallan. Mallan recounts the findings of numerous scientists who all conclude based on the research conducted that smoking can be rendered harmless or considerably less harmful if the cigarette is equipped with a charcoal filter. Other brands mentioned in the book with charcoal filters include Philip Morris multi-filter, Galaxie, and Tempo.

Subsequent research questioned whether the charcoal filter might have actually made Lark a more dangerous cigarette. A paper published in March 1997 by J.L. Pauly, et al., offered the following conclusion:

"Charcoal granules are incorporated into cigarette filters to aid in removing toxins in cigarette smoke. In studies of Lark, a popular American cigarette with a charcoal filter, charcoal granules were observed on the filter surface, and were released from the filter when the cigarettes were smoked. During smoking, the toxin-containing charcoal granules are inhaled or ingested. The specific adverse health effects of inhaling or ingesting carbon granules have not been addressed; nevertheless, the smoker, as an educated consumer, should be informed of the possible health risks."

=== Charcoal filter and decrease of cancer ===
In January 1964, Louis Fieser, a member of the Surgeon General's Advisory Committee on Smoking and Lung Cancer, said that Lark cigarettes were probably safer than all other brands.

Fieser, Sheldon Emery Professor of Organic Chemistry, recommended that smokers who were unable to quit should switch to Larks. According to Fieser, the charcoal for the Lark filter was specially developed to screen out gases known to depress the action of cilia in the respiratory tract. While at the time Larks were the only cigarette to use this special charcoal, there was no reason why other cigarette manufacturers could not add the substance to their filters and thereby achieve the same probable level of safety as Larks.

"Speaking as a scientist," Fieser stated, "this filter represents a definite encouraging advance." He emphasized, however, that at least 20 years would have to lapse before mortality statistics of the type reviewed by the Surgeon General's committee would be available on the new filter. Fieser said that he, at the time, smoked Larks and occasionally a pipe. Though he stated that the safest course of action would be to stop smoking he refused to say whether he had any plans to quit.

The report of the Surgeon General's committee, of which Fieser is a member, concluded that "cigarette smoking is a health hazard of sufficient importance in the United States to warrant appropriate remedial action."

== Sponsorship ==
=== All Japan Grand Touring Car Championship ===
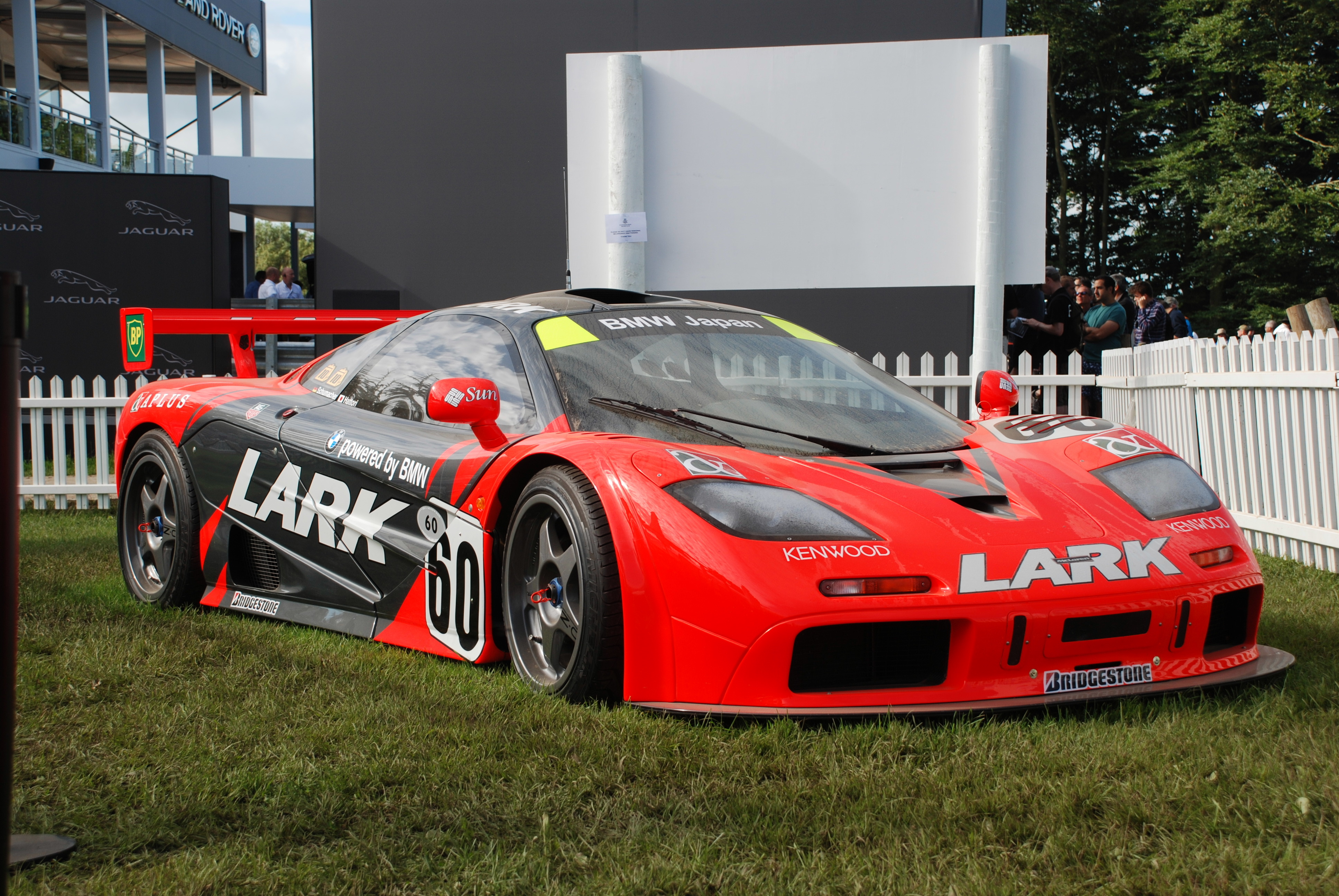
The 1996 F1 GTR of Team Lark on display.

Lark was the main sponsor of the Team Goh team which featured two McLaren F1 GTR cars to race in the All Japan Grand Touring Car Championship under the name "Team Lark GTR". Debuting at the opening round at Suzuka Circuit, the Lark team took a 1-2 finish, with winners Naoki Hattori and Ralf Schumacher. At the following round at the Fuji Speedway, David Brabham and John Nielsen would take victory for the Lark McLaren. However, in the next two rounds, the Japanese rivals would overcome the McLarens, only to have Team Lark return to take victory in the final two rounds of the season. At the Sugo round, Lark badly damaged their one chassis, requiring them to borrow chassis #04R from GTC Competition as a replacement for the final JGTC round. With four victories on the season, Team Lark captured the GT500 teams championship ahead of factory squads from Toyota and Nissan.

Team Lark would not return to defend their title in 1997, and no McLarens raced in the series. McLarens would return though in 1999 with Team Take One purchasing McLaren F1 GTR #19R, a 1997-spec car, for competition in GT500. The competition from Toyota, Honda, and Nissan had improved since the McLaren last raced, and therefore Team Take One struggled to be competitive, achieving only a best 9th place at Mine Circuit.

=== 24 Hours of Le Mans ===
Team Goh also participated in the 1997 24 Hours of Le Mans with a Lark livery, but it was censored because France prohibited sponsorship of tobacco products in sports.

== See also ==
- Tobacco smoking
