= Basic (cigarette) =

American cigarette brand

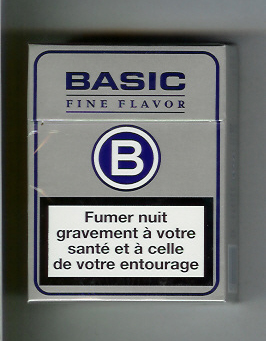
- French pack of Basic cigarettes
- Product type: Cigarette
- Current owner: Philip Morris International
- Produced by: Philip Morris USA; Philip Morris International
- Country: United States
- Introduced: Late 1970s
- Markets: See Markets
- Tagline: "The best things in life are Basic", "Keep it Basic"

Basic is a U.S. brand of cigarettes, currently owned by Philip Morris International. Cigarettes are manufactured by Philip Morris USA in the U.S. and by PMI in the rest of the world.

== History ==
Basic was launched in the late 1970s as a discount brand.

In 2005, Basic was the fourth most popular cigarette brand in the United States (following Marlboro, Newport, and Camel) and the second most popular among white smokers age 26 and older.

== Markets ==
Basic cigarettes are mainly sold in the United States, but also were or still are sold in Luxembourg, Sweden, Germany, France, Austria, Spain, Czech Republic, Hong Kong and Japan.

== See also ==
- Cigarette
- Tobacco smoking
