= Merit (cigarette) =

American brand of cigarettes

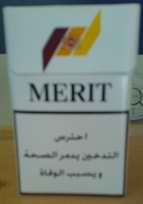
- Egyptian pack of Merit with a text warning (from 2008)
- Product type: Cigarette
- Current owner: Philip Morris USA in the U.S., Philip Morris International outside the U.S.
- Produced by: Philip Morris USA in the U.S., Philip Morris International outside the U.S.
- Country: United States
- Introduced: January 1976; 50 years ago
- Markets: See Markets

Merit is an American brand of cigarettes, currently owned and manufactured by Philip Morris USA in the United States and Philip Morris International outside the United States.

== History ==
A Philip Morris brand first introduced to national markets in January 1976, Merit used the positive connotation of its name in order to attract consumers. The word merit denotes a product worthy of praise or deserving of respect.

Philip Morris had seen the competitive value of a so-called "health cigarette" following the first Surgeon General's report on cigarettes in 1964. Over the course of the next 12 years Philip Morris worked on such a product, culminating in the 1976 product launch of the Merit brand. One key tactic was to "enrich" the product by applying extensive efforts in flavor chemistry and additives. Philip Morris seemed proud of the fact that they had managed this while using "less than 100 flavorants". While the advertising did boast about the product being "enriched", it did not disclose any of these less than 100 flavoring chemicals to consumers.

Internal industry documents reveal that in order to convince consumers that Merit had low tar as well as great taste, the ads had to be absolutely believable because the false claims of past years and past brands presented road-blocks.

An extensive consumer testing program of the brand was eventually conducted, including blind interviews with nearly 3000 smoker panellists. The majority of consumer participants reported that the new MERIT was equal or superior in taste to brands that delivered 60% more tar. Advertisements touted the product’s 'enriched flavor' and described, "After twelve years of intensive research, Philip Morris scientists isolated certain key ingredients in smoke that deliver taste way out of proportion to tar". This brand went on to capture a significant share of the low-tar cigarette market following its national launch in 1976.

Merit had a 3.1% market share in January 1992, a decline from 3.5% during the comparable period the year before, according to figures compiled by John C. Maxwell, Jr., an analyst at Wheat, First Securities Inc. Merit shipments for the period declined to 11.5 billion cigarettes, or more than half a billion packs, compared with 13.3 billion cigarettes, or close to three-quarters of a billion packs, during the 1990 months.

== Advertising ==
Since its introduction in 1976, Philip Morris has created many poster- and billboard adverts to promote Merit as a "low-tar" alternative.

A television ad to promote Merit Ultra Lights was also created.

The brand name, Merit, helped contribute to formulating an aura of credibility for the brand. The advertisements also reflected the same goal, with a strategy internally referred to as bold and aggressive. The ads were meant to convince consumers that Merit was a breakthrough cigarette, and thus presented information in the style of newspaper articles, featuring headlines with scientific substance and validity ads that looked important and impressive. Merit's ad campaign ran in the 1980s, used a journalistic, reportorial style which an editor might use for a front page story in a major newspaper.

During the 1970s, additional evidence of consumer confusion, misinformation, rationalizations, and the corresponding role played by advertising was gathered by multiple firms. Market researchers for the industry and its advertising agencies were not even confident that consumers knew what they were talking about when referring to the "taste" of a cigarette. "It is almost impossible to know if the taste smokers talk about is something which they, themselves attribute to a cigarette or just a `play-back' of some advertising messages".

Even the "taste" of a product was greatly influenced by the brand's image and reputation. Merit, as a free-standing brand, had difficulties in being perceived as flavorful, whereas in contrast, product line extensions like Marlboro Lights had the advantage of being perceived as more flavorful due to the taste reputation of the "parent" brand.

The market launch strategies gave particular emphasis to the choice of the name Merit, obviously communicating apparent virtue, and an advertising style that made this product development seem eminently scientific and newsworthy and less like an ad. The product launch strategy included a record level of advertising investment.

"The advertising was designed to overcome the low interest level in cigarette advertising, to communicate the technological breakthrough which MERIT represented and to report the impressive results of the taste testing program. To achieve these goals, a bold and aggressive strategy was devised featuring headlines and ads that had scientific substance and validity... The ads were written in a journalistic, repertorial [sic] style to be precise, pointed, and absolutely believable... This strategy entailed a multi-media blitz aimed at a broad range of smokers. It required a major commitment by Philip Morris USA to a high level of media investment. Newspapers and magazines were utilized nationwide to get the complete product story to consumers. Massive outdoor billboard displays, subway signs, taxi-tops and exterior bus posters would be used to create brand awareness. The displays utilized straight-forward graphics which were designed to provide sufficient visibility to give high spontaneous retail sales".

"Merit was the primary focus of the sales force for a full year... We spent $45 million on advertising—remember $45 million in 1976! This was a record amount for a new brand introduction... Creatively, we used provocative headlines and important looking copy which looked like it had real news value. Tar/taste theory exploded! - Smoke cracked! - Taste barrier broken!"

"The bold national launch of Merit by Philip Morris jolted the cigarette industry as few product introductions have. Full page newspaper ads trumpeted the arrival... the beginning of a blitz in all media that still has the competition muttering to itself. Industry insiders estimated that when media, point-of-purchase, promotion and collateral are totalled for the year, the sum will stand close to $50 million. Others suggest the roll-out of Merit is the most expensive new product introduction in the history of the cigarette industry".

When Merit Ultra Lights were introduced in 1983, the advertising program had an $80 million media budget, not even accounting for retail promotional efforts. This advertising featured imagery of large sailing ships in what was termed the "sea" campaign. The executions not only showed young people in an enviable, carefree, affluent lifestyle and a pristine environment, they also were careful to avoid any suggestions of danger. "In 1983, we adopted the sea campaign... First, to create an identity for Merit as the taste brand of low tars, and second to create an image for the brand which could be extended into promotions and retail materials... we showed young people on pleasure boats enjoying their leisure time and smoking Merit. We deliberately tried to avoid dangerous looking water".

The Tobacco Papers document the beleaguered industry’s alleged efforts to make the most of the mentally ill market. Philip Morris ran an ad for Merit cigarettes that seemed to many mental health professionals to be targeted to schizophrenics themselves. The ad showed a double image of a pack of Merits and read, "Schizophrenic.... For New Merit, having two sides is just normal behavior".

According to an ex-photographer who worked for Philip Morris and had to shoot various poster advertisements for the Merit brand, all the photos were created without the use of modern-day techniques such as Adobe Photoshop.

== Sponsorship ==
=== Sail racing ===
Merit sponsored the Merit Cup yacht and raced as a competitive team in the Whitbread Round the World Race from 1989 until the 1997-98 seasons.

== Controversy ==
=== Lawsuit against Philip Morris because of fire-risk Merit ===
In April 2004, a lawsuit had been filed by the U.S. Department of Justice against Philip Morris USA, the cigarettes' manufacturer, for concealing information about certain fire hazards of the brand.

It has been alleged that the rolling paper used in Merits was flammable in excess of standards.

== Markets ==
Merit is mainly sold in the United States, but also was or still is sold in the British Virgin Islands, Belgium, Netherlands, Switzerland, Germany, Spain, Ceuta, Melilla, Italy, Albania, Greece, Tunisia, Egypt and the United Arab Emirates.

== Products ==
=== United States ===
- Gold pack (light) - box: kings
- Blue pack (ultra light) - box: kings and 100s.

Discontinued:

- Gold pack (light) - soft: kings and 100s
- Blue pack (ultra light) - soft: kings and 100s
- Bronze pack (Ultima) - soft: kings and 100s, box: kings and 100s
- Menthol gold pack (light) - soft: kings and 100s
- Menthol silver pack (ultra light) - soft: kings and 100s

All the Merit cigarettes contain either all of a mixture of the following ingredients:

- Tobacco
- Water
- Sugars (Sucrose and/or invert sugar and/or High-fructose corn syrup)
- Propylene glycol
- Glycerol Licorice Extract
- Diammonium phosphate
- Ammonium hydroxide
- Cocoa and Cocoa Products
- Carob Bean and Extract
- Natural and Artificial Flavors
- Menthol

== In culture ==
Merit Ultra Lights are mentioned in Lev Grossman's The Magicians (Grossman novel).

The character played by Vittorio Gassman in Caro papà smokes this brand.

Merit Ultra Menthols are mentioned in AMC's The Walking Dead, Season 4 Episode 6 ('Live Bait').

Merit Ultra Lights are mentioned in Bret Easton Ellis American Psycho.

Blair Waldorf smokes Merit Ultra Light in the second novel of Gossip Girl

Carrie Bradshaw smokes Merit Lights in Sex and the City.

Pauli Gueltieri smokes Merit Yellow in The Sopranos Season 2 Episode 4 Commendatori.

== See also ==
- Nicotine
- Tobacco smoking
- List of cigarette smoke constituents
- List of additives in cigarettes
