= Parliament (cigarette) =

American brand of cigarettes

- Israeli pack of Parliament cigarettes
- Product type: Cigarette
- Current owner: Philip Morris International
- Produced by: Philip Morris International
- Country: United States
- Introduced: 1931; 95 years ago
- Markets: See Markets
- Tagline: "Only the flavor touches your lips", "Tobacco tastes best when the filter's recessed"
- Website: MyParliament.com

Parliament is an American brand of cigarettes, currently owned and manufactured by Philip Morris USA in the United States and Philip Morris International outside of the United States.

== History ==
The brand was launched in 1931 and is distinctive for its recessed paper filters. It was originally used as an advertising gimmick when cigarettes did not have filters. The first commercial cigarette filters came into use in 1935.

Until the late 1950s, Parliament was packaged in a two-layer "hard" pack. That packaging continued under the Benson & Hedges brand after Parliament adopted a conventional paper pack.

Parliament is one of few brands of cigarettes on the mainstream market to feature a recessed paper filter. Cigarette filters became common in most cigarettes in the 1950s. In the 1950s and 1960s, the brand was marketed for its unique filters, with advertisements reading, "Only the flavor touches your lips", and "Tobacco tastes best when the filter's recessed". The brand also claimed that the recessed filter prevented tar from making contact with the smoker's mouth, unlike standard filters.

Parliament makes up 1.9% of U.S. cigarette sales, in contrast to Marlboro, which represents 41.1% of U.S. cigarette sales. From the 1950s on, the cigarette had a reputation for being popular among affluent smokers.

It is the 12th best-selling international brand and the 4th largest PMI brand. In 2016, the volume of produced Parliament cigarettes was 46 billion. The brand is sold in more than 30 countries.

== Advertising ==
In the television commercials that were once broadcast in Japan, the image of New York was strongly issued. From the early to the mid-1980s, things like CG animation, which had been the package designs of Parliament, ranged from the cityscape of New York to roads and bridges, etc. From around the end of the 1980s, the aerial photographs of New York by live action turned into things to be used. Since entering the 1990s, under the image strategy of being even more expensive, BGM was shedding the number of AOR artists such as Bobby Caldwell with beautiful images. Among them were included a self-cover version by Bobby of "Stay With Me" for KA, GU, YA (the theme song of the movie Bamboo Story) that was offered to Peter Cetera. Kyōzō Nagatsuka was in charge of the narration at that time.

Actor Charlie Sheen appeared in ads for Parliament in Japan in the 1990s.

== Markets ==
Parliament was or still is sold in the following countries: United States, Bulgaria, Serbia, Brazil, Cyprus, Uruguay, Argentina, Germany, Switzerland, Poland, Romania, Moldova, Estonia, Armenia, India, Pakistan, Lithuania, Latvia, Kuwait, Belarus, Ukraine, Russia, Kazakhstan, Kyrgyzstan, Georgia, Turkey, Qatar, Saudi Arabia, United Arab Emirates, Egypt, Israel, Jordan, Mongolia, China, Taiwan, Japan, South Korea, and Australia.

== U.S. varieties ==
Parliament is sold in the following varieties:

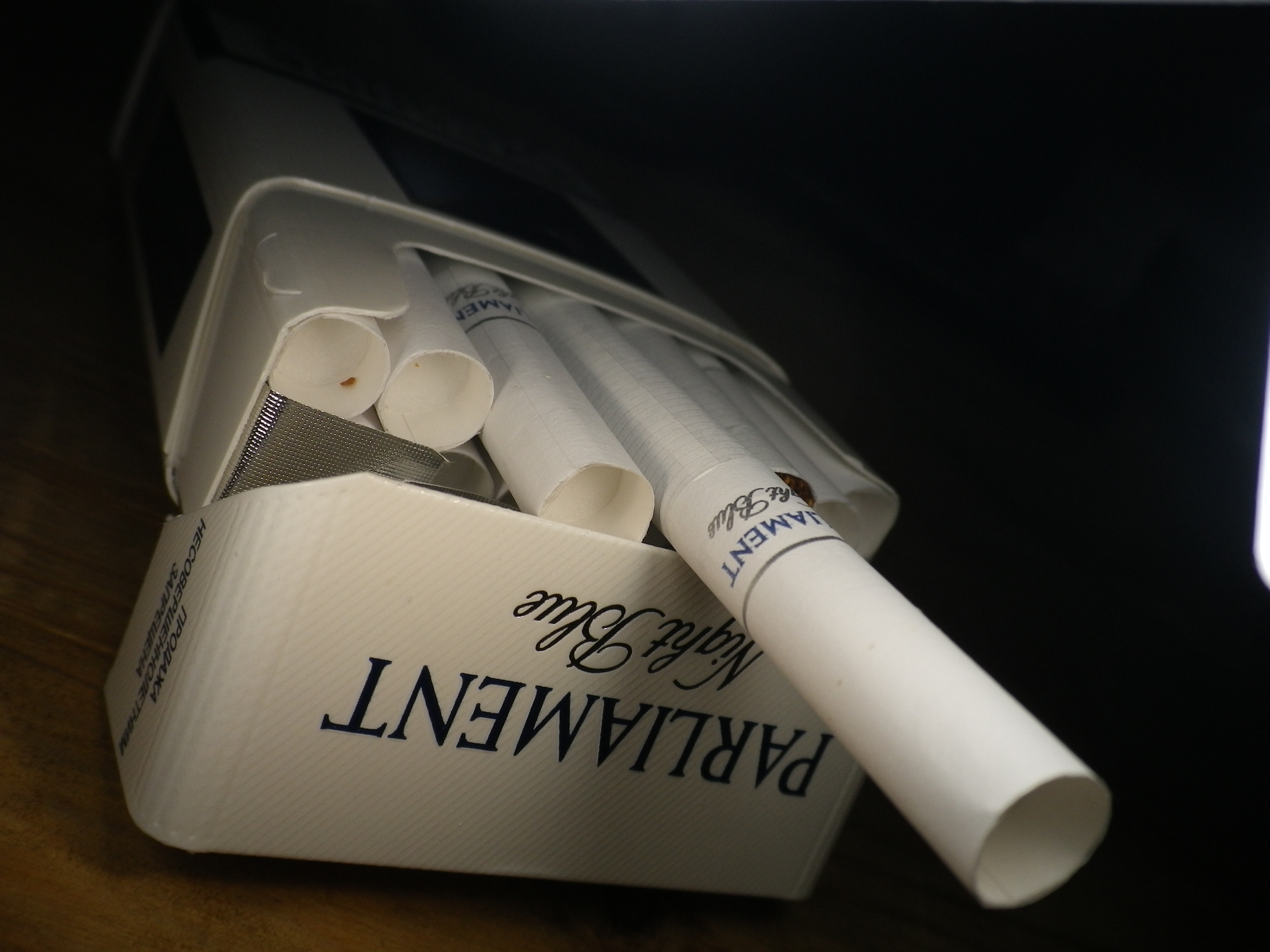
Parliament cigarettes with recessed filter

- Blue Pack (Full Flavor) Kings—Box
- White Pack (Lights) Kings—Soft and Box
- White Pack (Lights) 100's—Soft and Box
- Silver Pack (Ultra Lights) Kings—Box

=== Menthol ===
- Green Pack (Menthol Full Flavor) Kings—Box
- White Pack (Menthol Lights) Kings—Box
- White Pack (Menthol Lights) 100's—Box
- Silver Pack (Menthol Ultra Lights) Kings—Box

== See also ==
- Altria (Formerly Philip Morris)
- Nicotine
- Tobacco smoking
