= Cigarette =

Small roll of tobacco made to be smoked

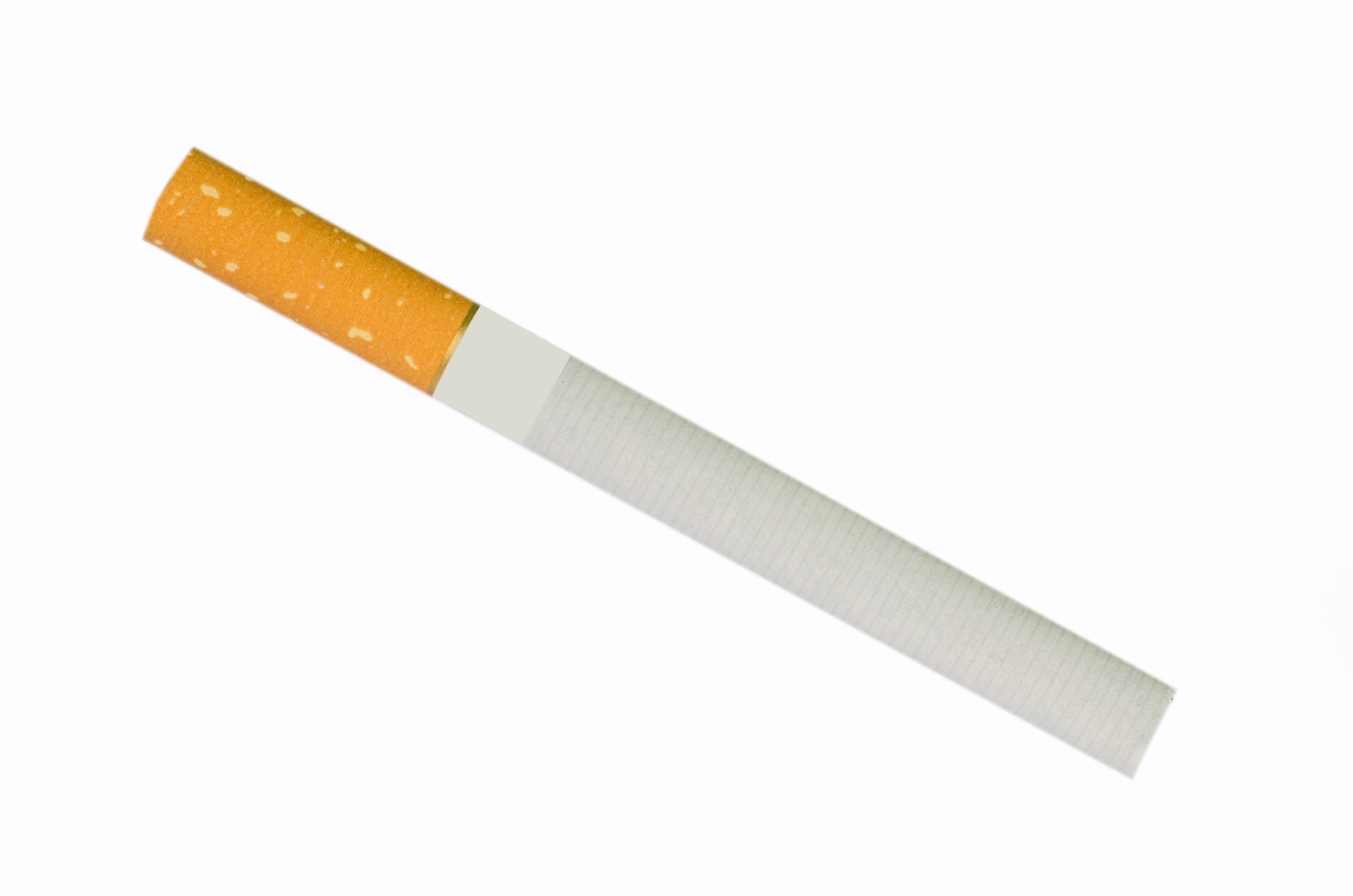
A filtered cigarette

A cigarette is a thin cylinder of tobacco rolled in thin paper for smoking. Igniting one end causes it to smolder, and the smoker inhales the resulting smoke through the other end. Cigarette smoking is the most common method of tobacco consumption. The term cigarette usually refers to a tobacco cigarette, but the word is sometimes used to refer to other substances, such as a cannabis cigarette or an herbal cigarette. A cigarette differs from a cigar in its smaller size, use of processed leaf, different smoking method, and paper wrapping, which is typically white.

Cigarette smoking has many negative health effects. These include diseases such as cancer, chronic obstructive pulmonary disease (COPD), heart disease, birth defects, and other health problems relating to nearly every organ of the body. Most modern cigarettes are filtered, but that does not mean the smoke inhaled from them contains fewer carcinogens or harmful chemicals. Nicotine, the psychoactive drug in tobacco, makes cigarettes highly addictive. About half of cigarette smokers die of tobacco-related disease and lose, on average, 14 years of life. Every year, cigarette smoking causes more than 8 million deaths worldwide; more than 1.3 million of these are non-smokers dying as a result of exposure to secondhand smoke. These harmful effects have led to legislation that has prohibited smoking in many workplaces and public areas, regulated marketing and purchasing age of tobacco, and levied taxes to discourage cigarette use.

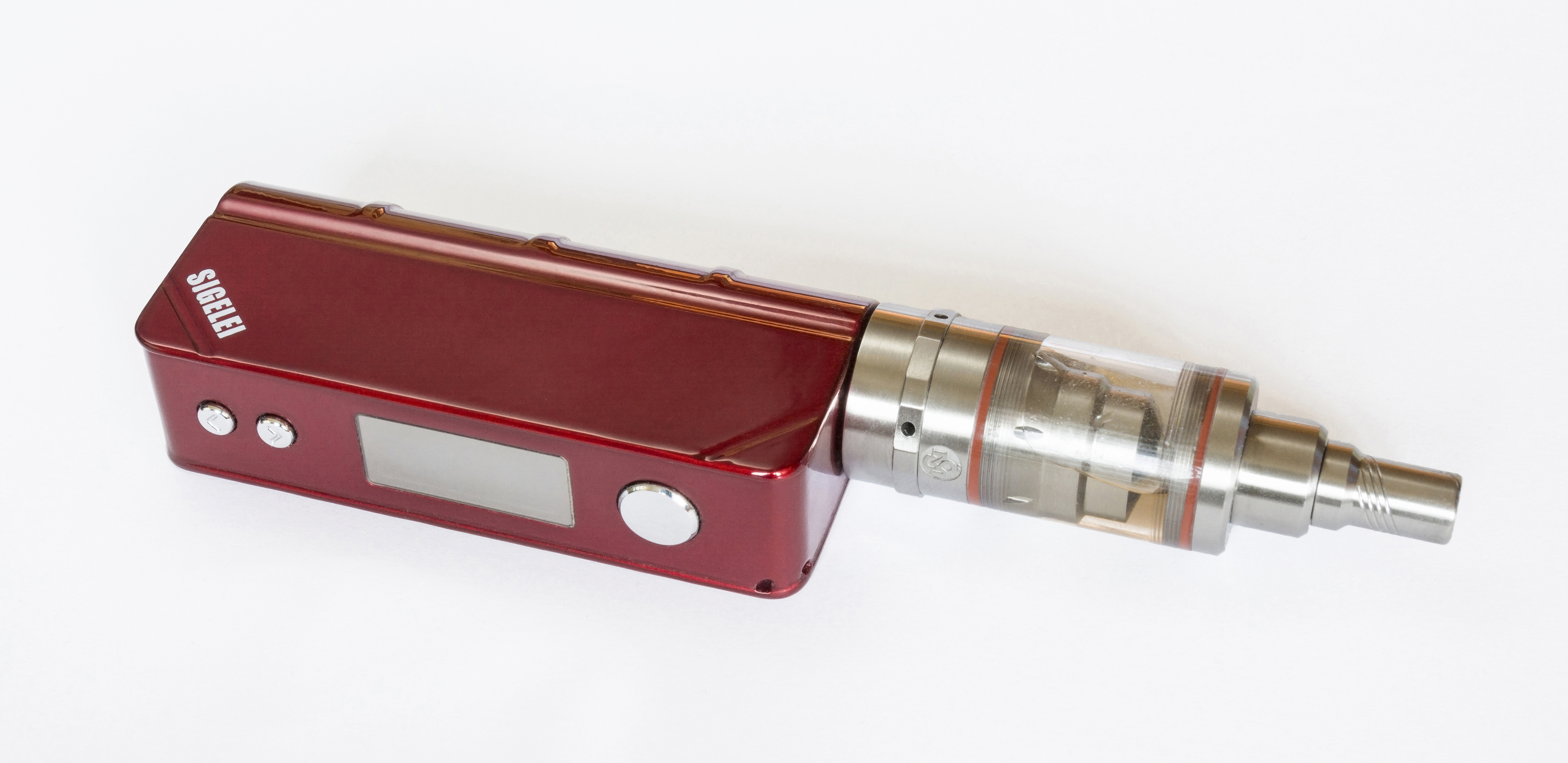
An electronic cigarette

In the 21st century, electronic cigarettes (also called e-cigarettes or vapes) were developed, whereby a substance contained within the device (typically a liquid solution containing nicotine) is vaporized by a battery-powered heating element as opposed to being burned. Although e-cigarettes are considered to be less harmful than conventional cigarettes, there are still significant health risks associated with their use.

Cigarettes and other smoking materials, especially when people fall asleep with a lit item, are a major cause of residential fires, accounting for about 28% of fires involving upholstered furniture. Fire-safe cigarettes reduce the risk to some extent (by approximately 11-45%, depending on the country and type of fire), but the risk remains high.

== History ==
=== Global ===
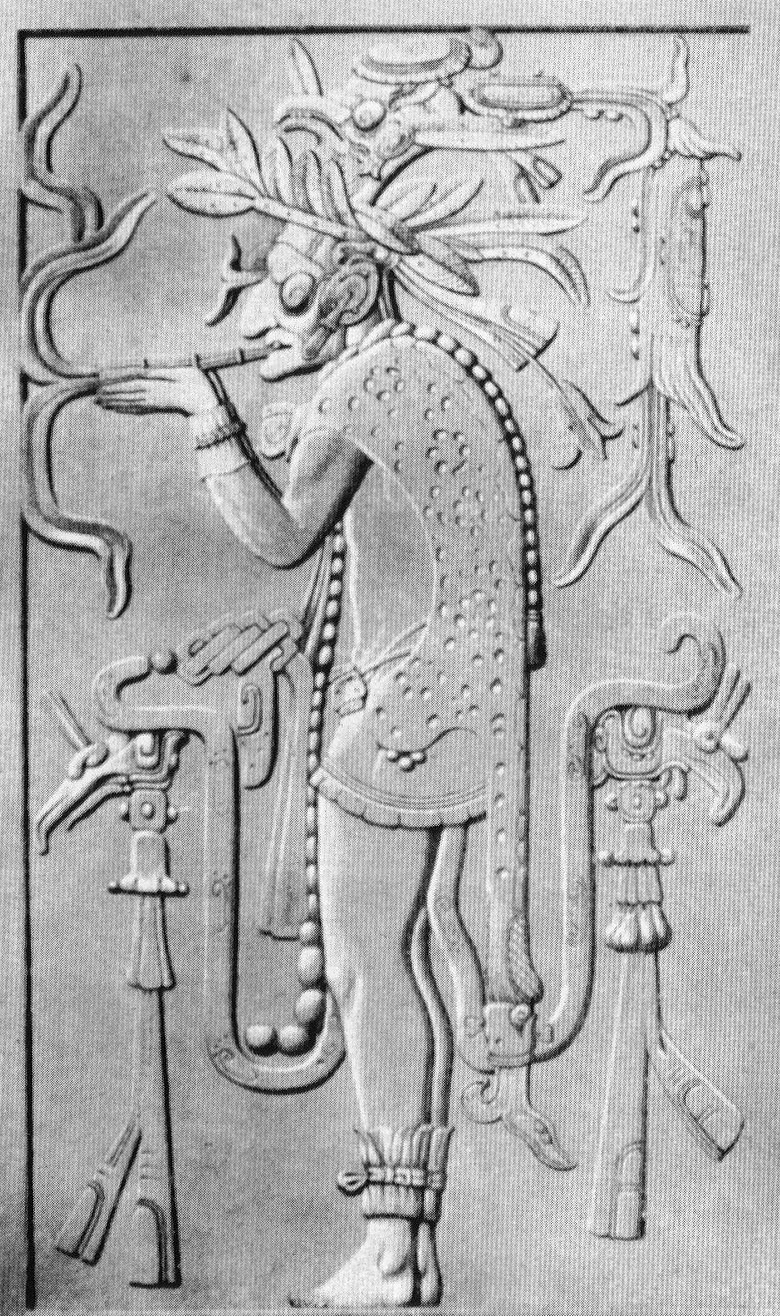
A reproduction of a carving from the temple at Palenque, Mexico, depicting a Maya deity using a smoking tube

The earliest forms of cigarettes were similar to their predecessor, the cigar. Cigarettes appear to have had antecedents in Mexico and Central America around the 9th century in the form of reeds and smoking tubes. The Maya, and later the Aztecs, smoked tobacco and other psychoactive drugs in religious rituals and frequently depicted priests and deities smoking on pottery and temple engravings. The cigarette and the cigar were the most common methods of smoking in the Caribbean, Mexico, and Central and South America until recent times.

The North American, Central American, and South American cigarette used various plant wrappers; when it was brought back to Spain, maize wrappers were introduced, and by the 17th century, fine paper. The resulting product was called papelate and is documented in Goya's paintings La Cometa, La Merienda en el Manzanares, and El juego de la pelota a pala (18th century).

By 1830 the cigarette had become known in France, where it received the name cigarette, and in 1845 the French state tobacco monopoly began manufacturing them. The French word made its way into English in the 1840s. Some American reformers promoted the spelling cigaret, but this was never widespread and is now largely abandoned.

The first patented cigarette-making machine was invented by Juan Nepomuceno Adorno of Mexico in 1847. In the 1850s, Turkish cigarette leaves became popular. However, production climbed markedly when another cigarette-making machine was developed in the 1880s by James Albert Bonsack, which vastly increased the productivity of cigarette companies, which went from making about 40,000 hand-rolled cigarettes daily to around 4 million. At the time, these imported cigarettes from the United States had significant sales among British smokers.

In the English-speaking world, the use of tobacco in cigarette form became increasingly widespread during and after the Crimean War, when British soldiers began emulating their Ottoman Turkish comrades and Russian enemies, who had begun rolling and smoking tobacco in strips of old newspaper for lack of proper cigar-rolling leaf. This was helped by the development of tobaccos suitable for cigarette use, and by the development of the Egyptian cigarette export industry.

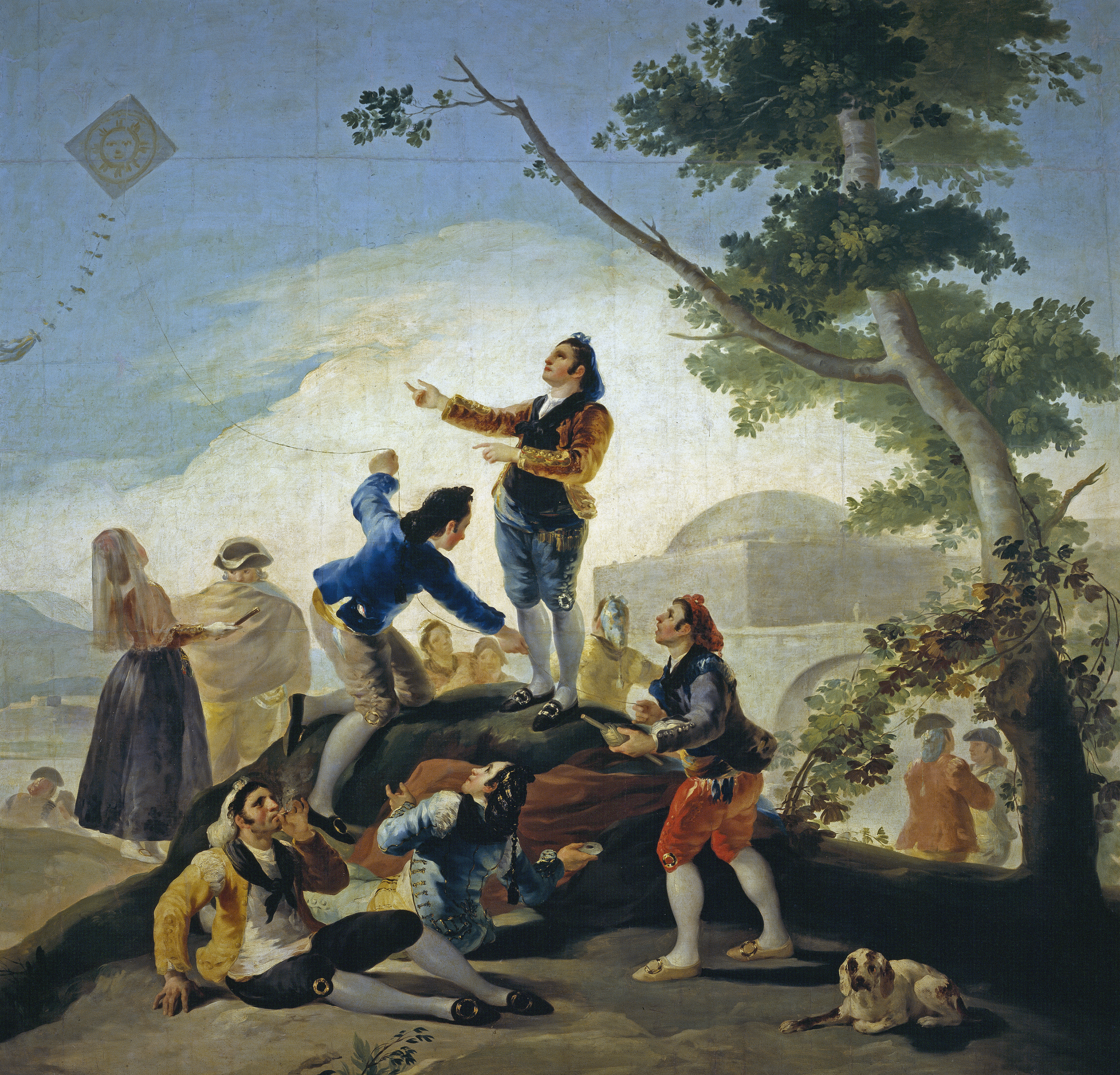
Francisco Goya's La Cometa, depicting a (foreground left) man smoking an early quasicigarette

Initially, not all cigarette smokers inhaled the smoke produced by cigarettes due to its high alkalinity levels. Starting in the 1930s, the tobacco industry began to conduct advertising campaigns encouraging the inhaling of cigarette smoke. However, Helmuth von Moltke noticed in the 1830s that Ottomans (and he himself) inhaled the Turkish tobacco and Latakia from their pipes (both are initially sun-cured, acidic leaf varieties).

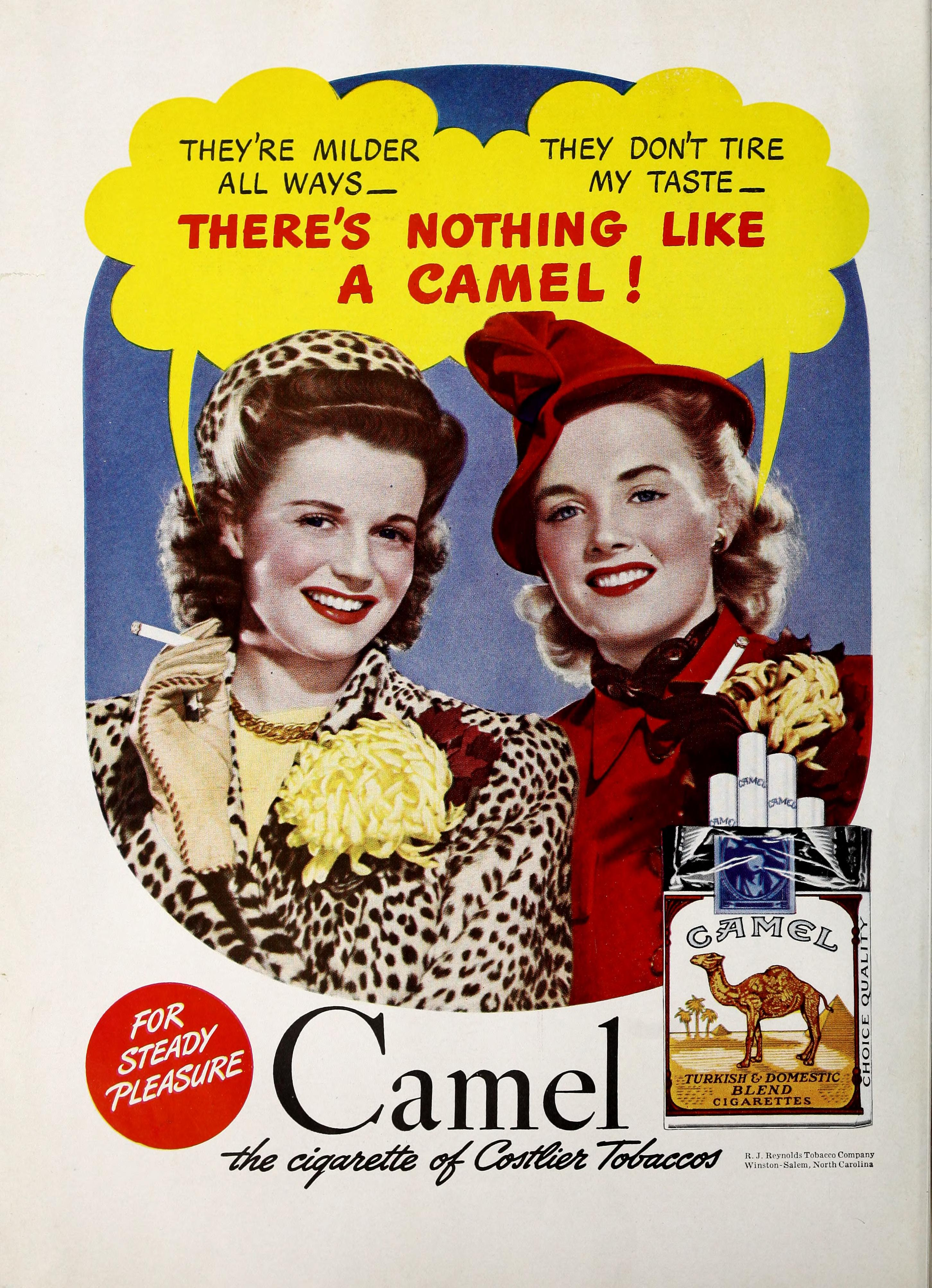
A 1942 ad encourages women to smoke Camel brand cigarettes.

The widespread smoking of cigarettes in the Western world is largely a 20th-century phenomenon. By the late 19th century cigarettes were known as coffin nails but the link between lung cancer and smoking was not established until the 20th century. German doctors were the first to make the link, and it led to the first antitobacco movement in Nazi Germany.

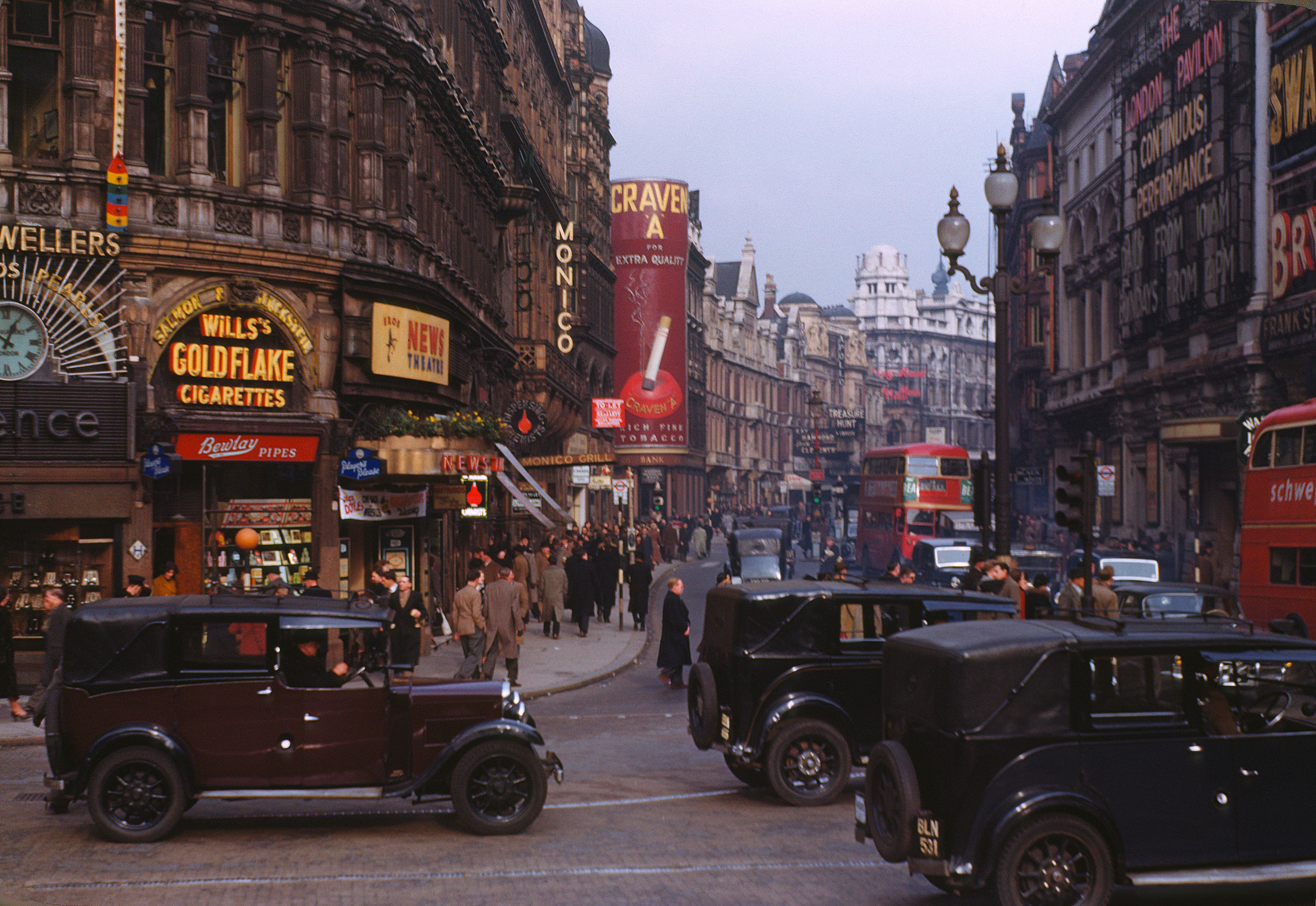
Cigarette brands, including Craven "A", advertised in Shaftesbury Avenue, London in 1949

During World War I and World War II, cigarettes were rationed to soldiers. During the Vietnam War, the U.S. included cigarettes with C-ration meals; however, cigarettes were removed from U.S. military rations in 1975. During the second half of the 20th century, the adverse health effects of tobacco smoking started to become widely known and printed health warnings became common on cigarette packets.

Graphical cigarette warning labels are a more effective method to communicate to the public the dangers of cigarette smoking. Canada, Mexico, Belgium, Denmark, Sweden, Thailand, Malaysia, India, Pakistan, Australia, Argentina, Brazil, Chile, Peru, Greece, the Netherlands, New Zealand, Norway, Hungary, the United Kingdom, France, Romania, Singapore, Egypt, Jordan, Nepal and Turkey all have both textual warnings and graphic visual images displaying, among other things, the damaging effects tobacco use has on the human body. The United States has implemented textual but not graphical warnings.

The cigarette has evolved much since its conception; for example, thin bands that travel transverse to the "axis of smoking" (thus forming circles along the length of the cigarette) are alternate sections of thin and thick paper to facilitate effective burning when being drawn, and retard burning when at rest. Synthetic particulate filters may remove some tar before it reaches the smoker.

The "holy grail" for cigarette companies has been a cancer-free cigarette. The closest historical attempt was produced by scientist James Mold. Under the name "Project TAME", he produced the XA cigarette using palladium. However, in 1978, his project was terminated.

Since 1950, the average nicotine and tar content of cigarettes has steadily fallen. Research has shown that the fall in overall nicotine content has led to smokers inhaling larger volumes of smoke per puff.

=== United States ===
One entrepreneur who was quick to spot the advantages of machine-made cigarettes was James Buchanan Duke. Previously a producer of smoking tobacco only, his firm, W. Duke & Sons & Co., entered the cigarette industry in the early 1880s. After installing two Bonsack machines, Duke spent heavily on advertising and sales promotion, and by 1889 his was the largest cigarette manufacturer in the country. The new Bonsack machines were of decisive importance in the rapid, cheap manufacture of all tobacco products but one. Cigars needed slow, laborious hand rolling and were produced in hundreds of small workshops, especially in New York City. In 1890 Duke and the other four major cigarette companies combined to form the American Tobacco Company, a firm that dominated the market and used aggressive tactics on hundreds of small competitors until they sold out to the firm. It was also called the "Tobacco Trust". The trust soon expanded its operations to include cigars, smoking, chewing tobacco and snuff. Among the companies drawn into this organization were the plug manufacturers Liggett & Myers and R. J. Reynolds Tobacco Company, which at the time produced twist and flat plug, and P. Lorillard, an old-line manufacturer of snuff. By 1910 the trust produced 86% of all cigarettes produced in the United States, and 75% to 95% of other forms, but only 14% of cigars produced in the country.

At the start of the 20th century, the per capita annual consumption in the U.S. was 54 cigarettes (with fewer than 0.5% of the population smoking more than 100 cigarettes per year), and consumption peaked at 4,259 per capita in 1965. At that time, about 50% of men and 33% of women smoked (defined as smoking more than 100 cigarettes per year). By 2000, consumption had fallen to 2,092 per capita, corresponding to about 30% of men and 22% of women smoking more than 100 cigarettes per year, and by 2006 per capita consumption had declined to 1,691, corresponding to about 21% of the population smoking 100 cigarettes or more per year.

== Construction ==
Diagram of a cigarette: 1. Mainstream smoke; 2. Filtration material; 3. Adhesives; 4. Ventilation holes; 5. Ink; 6. Adhesive; 7. Sidestream smoke; 8. Filter; 9. Tipping paper; 10. Tobacco and ingredients; 11. Paper; 12. Burning point and ashes

Manufacturers have described the cigarette as "a drug administration system for the delivery of nicotine in acceptable and attractive form". Modern commercially manufactured cigarettes consist mainly of a tobacco blend, paper, PVA glue to bond the outer layer of paper together, and often also a cellulose acetate–based filter. While the assembly of cigarettes is straightforward, much focus is given to the creation of each of the components, in particular the tobacco blend. A key ingredient that makes cigarettes more addictive is the inclusion of reconstituted tobacco, which has additives to make nicotine more volatile as the cigarette burns.

=== Paper ===
The paper for holding the tobacco blend may vary in porosity to allow ventilation of the burning embers or contain materials that control the burning rate of the cigarette and stability of the produced ash. The papers used in tipping the cigarette (forming the mouthpiece) and surrounding the filter stabilize the mouthpiece from saliva and moderate the burning of the cigarette, as well as the delivery of smoke with the presence of one or two rows of small laser-drilled air holes.

=== Tobacco blend ===
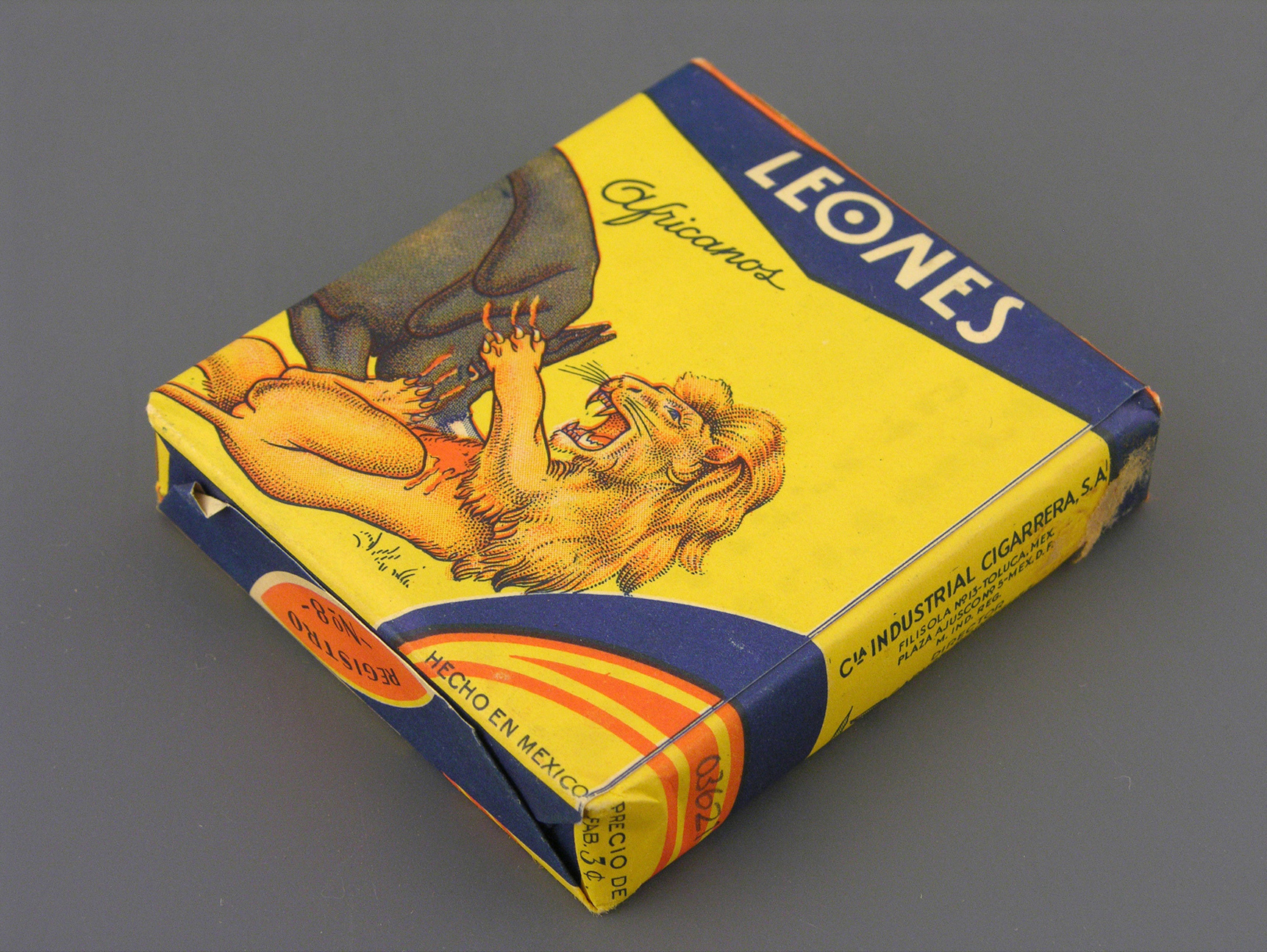
Leones Africanos brand cigarettes from the mid-20th century, part of the permanent collection of the Museo del Objeto del Objeto

The process of blending gives the end product a consistent taste, as batches of tobacco grown in different regions may change in flavor profile from year to year due to different environmental conditions.

Modern cigarettes produced after the 1950s, although composed mainly of shredded tobacco leaf, use a significant quantity of tobacco processing byproducts in the blend. Each cigarette's tobacco blend is made mainly from the leaves of flue-cured brightleaf, burley tobacco, and oriental tobacco. These leaves are selected, processed, and aged prior to blending and filling. The processing of brightleaf and burley tobaccos for tobacco leaf "strips" produces several byproducts such as leaf stems, tobacco dust, and tobacco leaf pieces ("small laminate"). To improve the economics of producing cigarettes, these byproducts are processed separately into forms where they can then be added back into the cigarette blend without a marked change in the cigarette's quality. The most common tobacco byproducts include:

- Blended leaf (BL) sheet: A thin, dry sheet cast from a paste made with tobacco dust collected from tobacco stemming, finely milled burley-leaf stem, and pectin.
- Reconstituted leaf (RL) sheet: A paper-like material made from recycled tobacco fines, tobacco stems and "class tobacco", which consists of tobacco particles less than 30 mesh in size (about 0.6 mm) that are collected at any stage of tobacco processing. RL is made by extracting soluble chemicals in tobacco byproducts, processing the leftover tobacco fibers from the extraction into a paper, and then reapplying the extracted materials in concentrated form onto the paper in a fashion similar to paper sizing. At this stage, ammonium additives are applied to make reconstituted tobacco an effective nicotine delivery system.
- Expanded (ES) or improved stem (IS): Expanded stem is rolled, flattened, and shredded leaf stems that are expanded by being soaked in water and rapidly heated. Improved stem follows the same process, but is simply steamed after shredding. Both products are then dried. These products look similar in appearance, but are different in taste.

According to data from the World Health Organization, the amount of tobacco per 1000 cigarettes fell from 1.03 kg (2.28 pounds) in 1960 to 0.41 kg (0.91 pounds) in 1999, largely as a result of reconstituting tobacco, fluffing, and additives.

A recipe-specified combination of brightleaf, burley-leaf, and oriental-leaf tobacco is mixed with various additives to improve its flavors. Most commercially available cigarettes today contain tobacco that is treated with sugar to counter the harshness of the smoke.

=== Additives ===
Various additives are combined into shredded tobacco product mixtures, including humectants such as propylene glycol or glycerol, as well as flavoring products and enhancers such as cocoa powder, licorice, tobacco extracts, and various sugars, which are known collectively as "casings". The leaf tobacco is then shredded, along with a specified amount of small laminate, expanded tobacco, BL, RL, ES, and IS. A perfume-like flavor/fragrance, called the "topping" or "toppings", which is most often formulated by flavor companies, is then blended into the tobacco mixture to improve the consistency in flavor and taste of the cigarettes associated with a certain brand name. Additionally, they replace flavors lost due to the repeated wetting and drying used in processing the tobacco. Finally, the tobacco mixture is filled into cigarette tubes and packaged.

A list of 599 cigarette additives, created by five major American cigarette companies, was approved by the Department of Health and Human Services in April 1994. None of these additives is listed as an ingredient on cigarette packs. These chemicals are added for organoleptic purposes, and many boost the addictive properties of cigarettes, especially when burned.

One of the classes of chemicals on the list, ammonia salts, converts bound nicotine molecules in tobacco smoke into free nicotine molecules. This process, known as freebasing, could potentially increase the effect of nicotine on the smoker, but experimental data suggests that absorption is, in practice, unaffected.

=== Cigarette tube ===
Cigarette tubes are prerolled cigarette paper usually with an acetate or paper filter at the end. They have an appearance similar to a finished cigarette, but do not contain any tobacco or smoking material inside, as the consumer is intended to fill the tube themself. They may vary in length from regular (70 mm) to king size (84 mm) as well as 100s (100 mm) and 120s (120 mm).

Cigarette tubes are usually filled with a cigarette injector (also known as a shooter). Cone-shaped cigarette tubes, known as cones, can be filled using a packing stick or straw because of their shape. Cone smoking is popular because as the cigarette burns, it tends to get stronger and stronger. This is because the cone shape allows more tobacco to be burned at the beginning than the end, allowing for an even flavor.

The United States Tobacco Taxation Bureau defines a cigarette tube as "cigarette paper made into a hollow cylinder for use in making cigarettes."

=== Cigarette filter ===
A cigarette filter or filter tip is a component of a cigarette. Filters are typically made from cellulose acetate fibre. Most factory-made cigarettes are equipped with a filter; those who roll their own can buy them separately. Filters can reduce the presence of some substances, such as tar, in cigarette smoke, but do not actually make them any safer to smoke.

=== Cigarette butt ===
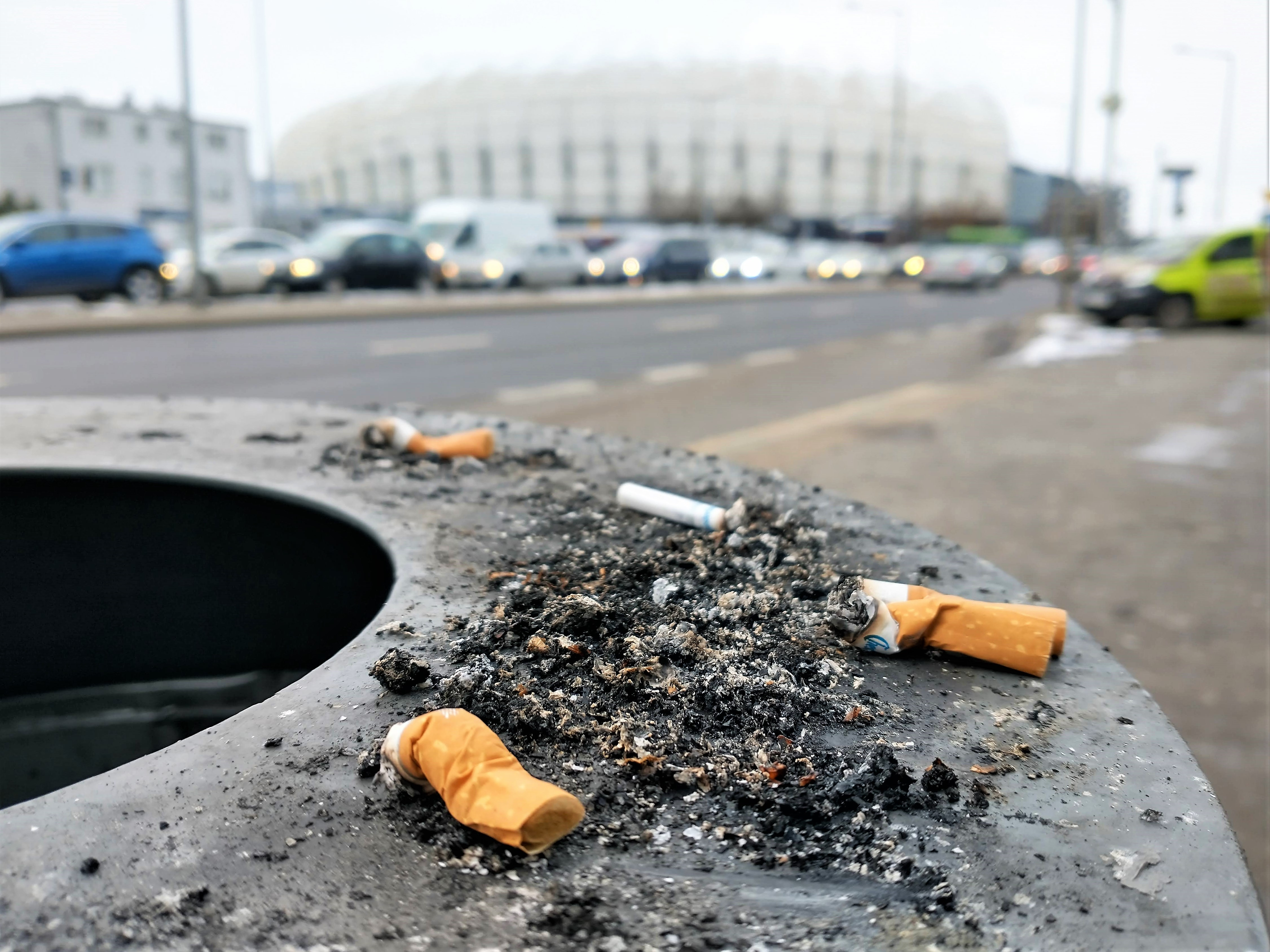
Discarded cigarette butts

In North America, the common name for the remains of a cigarette after smoking is a cigarette butt. In Britain, it is also called a dog-end or a fag end. The butt is typically about 30% of the cigarette's original length. It consists of a tissue tube which holds a filter and some remaining tobacco mixed with ash.

They are the most numerically frequent litter in the world. Cigarette butts accumulate outside buildings, on parking lots, and streets where they can be transported through storm drains to streams, rivers, and beaches. In a 2013 trial, the city of Vancouver, British Columbia, partnered with TerraCycle to create a system to encourage the recycling of cigarette butts. A reward of 1¢ per collected butt was offered to determine the effectiveness of a deposit system similar to that of beverage containers.

=== Manufacturing ===
The mechanization and automation of cigarette making is extensive. Since the latter half of the nineteenth century, machinery for rolling and packaging cigarettes has involved many patents and countless person-years of engineering, toolmaking, and millwrighting.

== Electronic cigarette ==
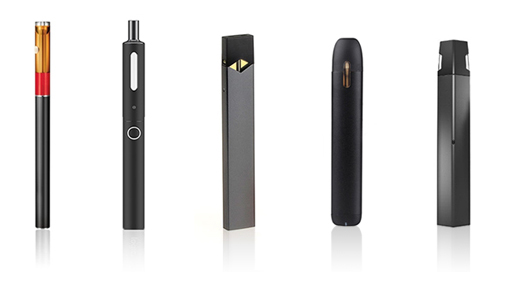
Various types of electronic cigarettes

An electronic cigarette (commonly known as a vape) is a handheld battery-powered vaporizer that simulates smoking by providing some of the behavioral aspects of smoking, including the hand-to-mouth action of smoking, but without combusting tobacco. Using an e-cigarette is known as "vaping" and the user is referred to as a "vaper". Instead of cigarette smoke, the user inhales an aerosol, commonly called vapor. E-cigarettes typically have a heating element that atomizes a liquid solution called e-liquid. E-cigarettes are automatically activated by taking a puff; others turn on manually by pressing a button. Some e-cigarettes look like traditional cigarettes, but they come in many variations. Most versions are reusable, though some are disposable. There are first-generation, second-generation, third-generation, and fourth-generation devices. E-liquids usually contain propylene glycol, glycerin, nicotine, flavorings, additives, and differing amounts of contaminants. E-liquids are also sold without propylene glycol, nicotine, or flavors.

The benefits and the health risks of e-cigarettes are uncertain. There is moderate-certainty evidence that e-cigarettes with nicotine may help people quit smoking when compared with e-cigarettes without nicotine and nicotine replacement therapy. However, other studies have not supported the finding that e-cigarettes are more effective than smoking cessation medicine. There is concern with the possibility that non-smokers and children may start nicotine use with e-cigarettes at a rate higher than anticipated than if they were never created. Following the possibility of nicotine addiction from e-cigarette use, there is also concern children may start smoking traditional cigarettes in greater numbers as well, as youth who use e-cigarettes are more likely to go on to smoke cigarettes. Their part in tobacco harm reduction is unclear, while another review found they appear to have the potential to lower tobacco-related death and disease. Regulated US Food and Drug Administration nicotine replacement products may be safer than e-cigarettes, but e-cigarettes are generally seen as safer than combusted tobacco products. It is estimated their safety risk to users is similar to that of smokeless tobacco. The long-term effects of e-cigarette use are unknown. The risk from serious adverse events was reported in 2016 to be low. Less serious adverse effects include abdominal pain, headache, blurry vision, throat and mouth irritation, vomiting, nausea, and coughing. Nicotine itself is associated with some health harms. In 2019 and 2020, an outbreak of severe lung illness throughout the US was linked to the use of vaping products.

E-cigarettes create vapor made of fine and ultrafine particles of particulate matter, which have been found to contain propylene glycol, glycerin, nicotine, flavors, small amounts of toxicants, carcinogens, and heavy metals, as well as metal nanoparticles, and other substances. Its exact composition varies across and within manufacturers, and depends on the contents of the liquid, the physical and electrical design of the device, and user behavior, among other factors. E-cigarette vapor potentially contains harmful chemicals not found in tobacco smoke. E-cigarette vapor contains fewer toxic chemicals, and lower concentrations of potential toxic chemicals than cigarette smoke. The vapor is probably much less harmful to users and bystanders than cigarette smoke, although concern exists that the exhaled vapor may be inhaled by non-users, particularly indoors.

== Health effects ==
=== Smokers ===
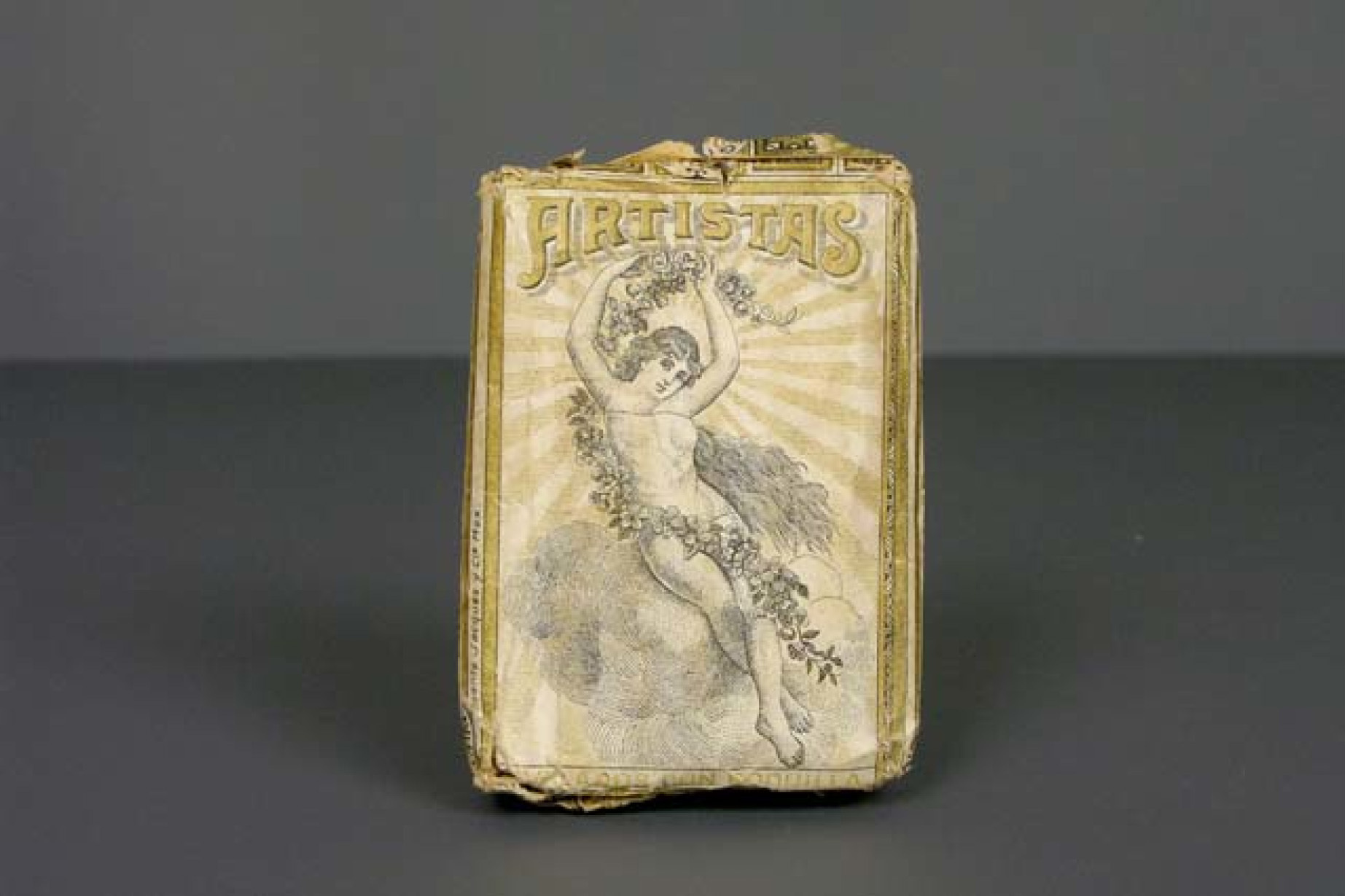
Artistas brand cigarette package of Mexico from the Museo del Objeto del Objeto collection

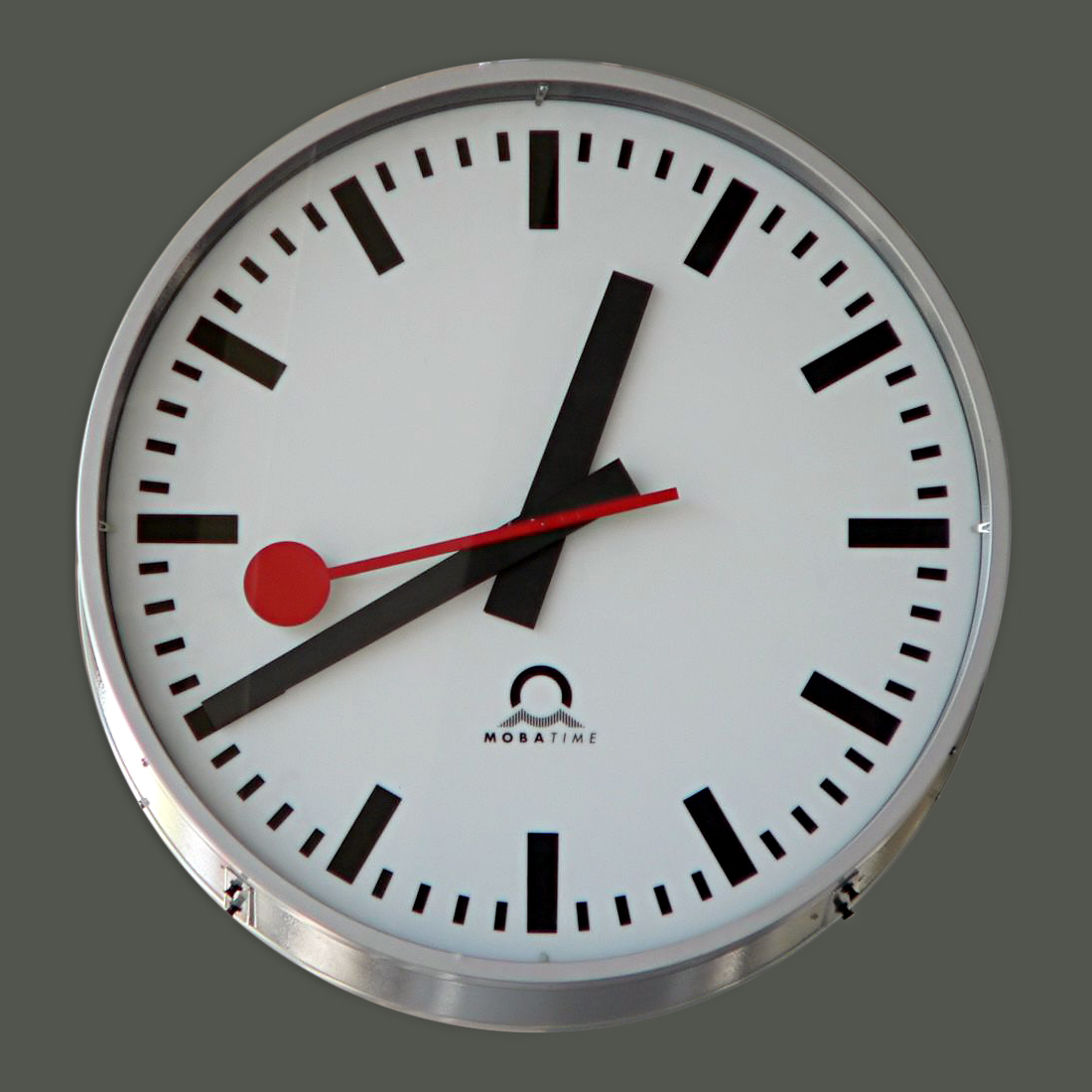
A 2024 study estimated that each cigarette reduces life expectancy by 20 minutes

The harm from smoking comes from the many toxic chemicals in the natural tobacco leaf and those formed in smoke from burning tobacco. A 2024 study estimated that each cigarette reduces life expectancy by 20 minutes, while other studies estimate that each one reduces life expectancy by about 11 minutes on average. Humans continue to smoke because nicotine, the primary psychoactive chemical in cigarettes, is highly addictive. Cigarettes, like narcotics, have been described as "strategically addictive", with their addictive properties being a core component of the business strategy. About half of smokers die from a smoking-related cause. Smoking harms nearly every organ of the body. Smoking leads most commonly to diseases affecting the heart, liver, and lungs, being a major risk factor for heart attacks, strokes, chronic obstructive pulmonary disease (COPD) (including emphysema and chronic bronchitis), and cancer (particularly lung cancer, cancers of the larynx and mouth, and pancreatic cancer). It also causes peripheral vascular disease and hypertension. The incidence of erectile dysfunction is approximately 85 percent higher in men who smoke compared to men who do not smoke. Children born to women who smoke during pregnancy are at higher risk of congenital disorders, cancer, respiratory disease, and sudden death. Starting smoking earlier in life and smoking cigarettes higher in tar content increases the risk of these diseases. The World Health Organization estimates that tobacco causes 8 million deaths each year as of 2019 and ultimately caused 100 million deaths over the course of the 20th century. Cigarettes produce an aerosol containing over 4,000 chemical compounds, including nicotine, carbon monoxide, acrolein, and oxidant substances. Over 70 of these are carcinogens.

The most important chemical compounds causing cancer are those that produce DNA damage since such damage appears to be the primary underlying cause of cancer. Cigarette smoking results in oxidative stress and oxidative DNA damage. DNA damage can be estimated by measuring urinary 8-hydroxy-2'-deoxyguanosine (8-OHdG) and 8-oxoguanine DNA glycosylase (OGG1). DNA damage was found in a population study to be significantly increased in 250 cigarette smokers compared to 200 non-cigarette smokers. Cunningham et al. combined the microgram weight of each compound in the smoke of one cigarette with the known genotoxic effect of that compound per microgram to identify the most carcinogenic compounds in cigarette smoke. The seven most important carcinogens in tobacco smoke are shown in the table below, along with the DNA alterations they cause.

The most genotoxic cancer-causing chemicals in cigarette smoke
Compound	Micrograms per cigarette	Effect on DNA	Ref.
Acrolein	122.4	Reacts with deoxyguanine and forms DNA crosslinks, DNA-protein crosslinks and DNA adducts	
Formaldehyde	60.5	DNA-protein crosslinks causing chromosome deletions and re-arrangements	
Acrylonitrile	29.3	Oxidative stress causing increased 8-oxo-2'-deoxyguanosine	
1,3-butadiene	105.0	Global loss of DNA methylation (an epigenetic effect) as well as DNA adducts	
Acetaldehyde	1448.0	Reacts with deoxyguanine to form DNA adducts	
Ethylene oxide	7.0	Hydroxyethyl DNA adducts with adenine and guanine	
Isoprene	952.0	Single and double strand breaks in DNA	

Number of current and expected smokers, and expected deaths
Country	Current and future smokers, ages 15+ (millions)	Approximate number of deaths in current and future smokers younger than 35, unless they quit (millions)
China (2010)	193	97
Indonesia (2011)	58	29
Russian Federation (2008)	32	16
United States (2011)	26	13
India (2009)	95	48
Bangladesh (2009)	25	13

One study by University Hospital of Wales found that "ulcerative colitis is a condition of nonsmokers in which nicotine is of therapeutic benefit." A 2002 review of the available scientific literature concluded that the apparent decrease in Alzheimer's disease risk may be simply because smokers tend to die before reaching the age at which it normally occurs. "Differential mortality is always likely to be a problem where there is a need to investigate the effects of smoking in a disorder with very low incidence rates before age 75 years, which is the case of Alzheimer's disease", it states, noting that smokers are only half as likely as nonsmokers to survive to the age of 80.

==== Gateway theory ====
An association has been found between adolescent exposure to nicotine by smoking conventional cigarettes and the subsequent onset of using other dependence-producing substances. Strong temporal and dose-dependent associations have been reported, and a plausible biological mechanism (via rodent and human modeling) suggests that long-term changes in the neural reward system take place as a result of adolescent smoking. Adolescent smokers of conventional cigarettes have disproportionately high rates of comorbid substance use, and longitudinal studies have suggested that early adolescent smoking may be a starting point or "gateway" for substance use later in life, with this effect more likely for persons with attention deficit hyperactivity disorder (ADHD). Although factors such as genetic comorbidity, innate propensity for risk-taking, and social influences may underlie these findings, both human neuroimaging and animal studies suggest a neurobiological mechanism also plays a role. In addition, behavioral studies in adolescent and young adult smokers have revealed an increased propensity for risk-taking, both generally and in the presence of peers, and neuroimaging studies have shown altered frontal neural activation during a risk-taking task as compared with nonsmokers. In 2011, Rubinstein and colleagues used neuroimaging to show decreased brain response to a natural reinforcer (pleasurable food cues) in adolescent light smokers (1–5 cigarettes per day), with their results highlighting the possibility of neural alterations consistent with nicotine dependence and altered brain response to reward even in adolescent low-level smokers.

=== Secondhand smoke ===
Secondhand smoke is a mixture of smoke from the burning end of a cigarette and the smoke exhaled from the lungs of smokers. It is involuntarily inhaled, lingers in the air for hours after cigarettes have been extinguished, and can cause a wide range of adverse health effects, including cancer, respiratory infections, and asthma. Nonsmokers who are exposed to second-hand smoke at home or work increase their heart disease risk by 25–30% and their lung cancer risk by 20–30%. Second-hand smoke has been estimated to cause 38,000 deaths per year, of which 3,400 are deaths from lung cancer in nonsmokers. Sudden infant death syndrome, ear infections, respiratory infections, and asthma attacks can occur in children who are exposed to second-hand smoke. Scientific evidence shows that no level of exposure to second-hand smoke is safe.

== Politics and lobbying ==
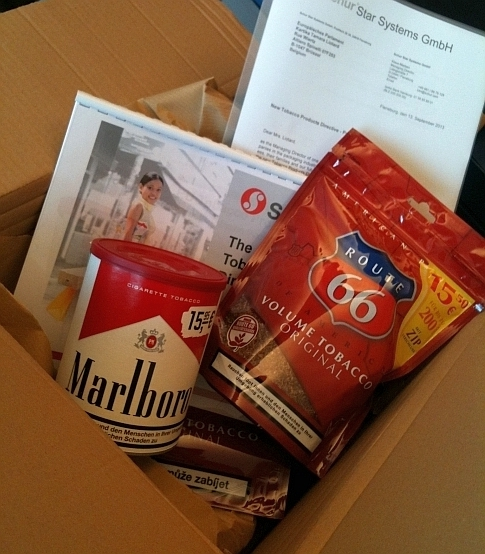
Gift offered by tobacco industry lobbyists to Dutch politician Kartika Liotard in 2013

Tobacco politics refers to the politics surrounding the use and distribution of tobacco, likewise with regulations.

In the United States, from the 1950s until the 1990s, tobacco industries wielded great influence in shaping public opinion on the health risks of tobacco. Despite the efforts of public health advocates, scientists, and those affected by smoking, both Congress and courts favored the tobacco industry in policy and litigation. It was not until the 1990s that public health advocates had more success in litigating against tobacco industries, including the 1998 Master Settlement Agreement between major tobacco companies and 46 state attorneys general. Although public opinion in the United States on tobacco use is generally unfavorable, many large tobacco companies continue to find success internationally, and tobacco companies have expanded into other product categories, such as electronic cigarettes, as traditional tobacco use declines.

As of 2018, 169 states have signed the World Health Organization (WHO) Framework Convention on Tobacco Control (FCTC), which governs international tobacco control. However, many nations have had difficulty complying with the FCTC, with higher rates of smoking especially in developing nations. There are currently almost 1.3 billion smokers globally.

== Legislation ==
=== Smoking restrictions ===
Many governments impose restrictions on smoking tobacco, especially in public areas. The primary justification has been the negative health effects of secondhand smoke. Laws vary by country and locality. Nearly all countries have laws restricting places where people can smoke in public, and over 40 countries have comprehensive smoke-free laws that prohibit smoking in virtually all public venues.

=== Smoking age ===
In the United States, the age to buy tobacco products is 21 in all states as of 2020. Similar laws exist in many other countries. In Canada, most of the provinces require smokers to be 19 years of age to purchase cigarettes (except for Quebec and the prairie provinces, where the age is 18). However, the minimum age only concerns the purchase of tobacco, not use. Alberta, however, does have a law which prohibits the possession or use of tobacco products by all persons under 18, punishable by a $100 fine. Australia, New Zealand, Poland, and Pakistan have a nationwide ban on the selling of all tobacco products to people under the age of 18.

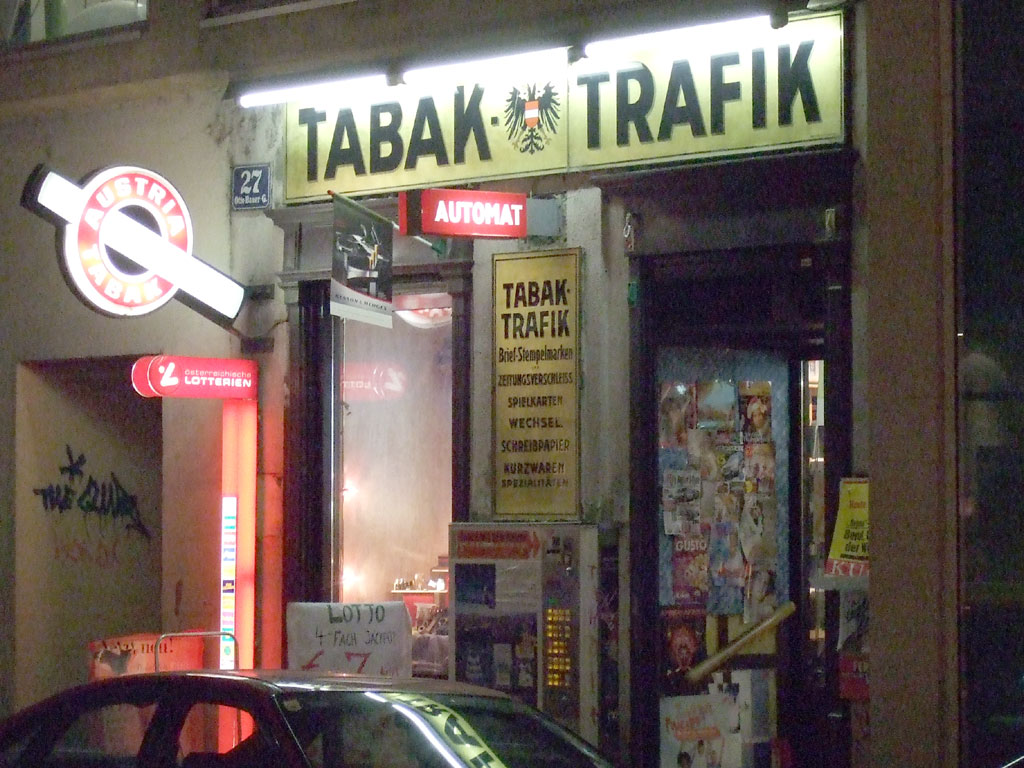
Tabak-Trafik in Vienna. Since January 1, 2007, all cigarette machines in Austria must attempt to verify a customer's age by requiring the insertion of a debit card or mobile phone verification.

Since October 1, 2007, it has been illegal for retailers to sell tobacco in all forms to people under the age of 18 in three of the UK's four constituent countries (England, Wales, Northern Ireland, and Scotland), increased from 16. It is also illegal to sell lighters, rolling papers, and all other tobacco-associated items to people under 18. It is not illegal for people under 18 to buy or smoke tobacco, it is only illegal for a retailer to sell a tobacco-associated item to them. The age increase from 16 to 18 came into force in Northern Ireland on September 1, 2008. In the Republic of Ireland, bans on the sale of smaller 10-packs and confectionery that resembles tobacco products (candy cigarettes) came into force on May 31, 2007, in a bid to cut underaged smoking. In October 2023, Prime Minister Rishi Sunak proposed a ban on sales of cigarettes to anyone born after 2008.

Most countries in the world have a legal vending age of 18. In North Macedonia, Italy, Malta, Austria, Luxembourg, and Belgium, the age for legal vending is 16. Since January 1, 2007, all cigarette machines in public places in Germany must attempt to verify a customer's age by requiring the insertion of a debit card. Turkey, which has one of the highest percentages of smokers by population, has a legal age of 18. Japan is one of the highest tobacco-consuming nations, and requires purchasers to be 20 years of age. Since July 2008, Japan has enforced this age limit at cigarette vending machines through use of the Taspo smart card. In other countries, such as Egypt, it is legal to use and purchase tobacco products regardless of age. Germany raised the purchase age from 16 to 18 on September 1, 2007.

Some police departments in the United States occasionally send an underaged teenager into a store where cigarettes are sold, and have the teen attempt to purchase cigarettes, with their own or no ID. If the vendor then completes the sale, the store is issued a fine. Similar enforcement practices are regularly performed by Trading Standards officers in the UK, and by equivalents in Israel and the Republic of Ireland.

=== Taxation ===
Taxes as a share of cigarette price

Cigarettes are taxed both to reduce use and to raise revenue. Higher prices for cigarettes discourage smoking. Every 10% increase in the price of cigarettes reduces youth smoking by about 7% and overall cigarette consumption by about 4%. The World Health Organization (WHO) recommends that globally cigarettes be taxed at a rate of at least 75% of their sale price as a way of deterring cancer, cardiovascular diseases and other negative health outcomes.

Cigarette sales are a significant source of tax revenue in many countries. This fact has historically been an impediment for health groups seeking to discourage cigarette smoking, since governments seek to maximize tax revenues. Furthermore, some countries have made cigarettes a state monopoly, which has the same effect on the attitude of government officials outside the health field.

=== Fire-safe cigarette ===
Cigarettes are a frequent source of deadly fires in private homes, which prompted both the European Union and the United States to require cigarettes to be fire-standard compliant. According to Simon Chapman, a professor of public health at the University of Sydney, reduction of burning agents in cigarettes would be a simple and effective means of dramatically reducing the ignition propensity of cigarettes. Since the 1980s, prominent cigarette manufacturers such as Philip Morris and R.J. Reynolds have developed fire safe cigarettes, but Phillip Morris was later the subject of a government lawsuit for allegedly hiding the even greater dangers associated with their brand of such cigarettes. The burn rate of cigarette paper is regulated through the application of different forms of microcrystalline cellulose to the paper. Cigarette paper has been specially engineered by creating bands of different porosity to create "fire-safe" cigarettes. These cigarettes have a reduced idle burning speed which allows them to self-extinguish. This fire-safe paper is manufactured by mechanically altering the setting of the paper slurry. New York was the first U.S. state to mandate that all cigarettes manufactured or sold within the state comply with a fire-safe standard. Canada has passed a similar nationwide mandate based on the same standard. All U.S. states are gradually passing fire-safe mandates.

The European Union in 2011 banned cigarettes that do not meet a fire-safety standard. According to a study made by the European Union of 16 European countries, 11,000 fires were due to people carelessly handling cigarettes between 2005 and 2007. This caused 520 deaths with 1,600 people injured.

=== Cigarette advertising ===
Many countries have restrictions on cigarette advertising, promotion, sponsorship, and marketing. For example, in the Canadian provinces of British Columbia, Saskatchewan and Alberta, the retail store display of cigarettes is completely prohibited if persons under the legal age of consumption have access to the premises. In the Canadian provinces of Ontario, Manitoba, Newfoundland and Labrador, and Quebec, as well as the Australian Capital Territory, the display of tobacco is prohibited for everyone, regardless of age, as of 2010. This retail display ban includes noncigarette products such as cigars and blunt wraps.

=== Warning messages on packaging ===
As a result of tight advertising and marketing prohibitions, tobacco companies view packaging as a vital factor in displaying brand imagery and creating in-store presence at the point of purchase. Market testing shows the influence of this dimension in shifting the consumer's choice when the same product is displayed in alternative packaging. Companies have manipulated a variety of elements on packaging designs to communicate the impression of lower tar content or milder cigarettes, although the actual contents were the same.

Some countries require cigarette packs to display warnings about the health impact of smoking. The United States was the first, later followed by other countries including Canada, most of Europe, the United Kingdom, Australia, Pakistan, India and Hong Kong. In 1985, Iceland became the first country to enforce graphic warnings on cigarette packaging. At the end of December 2010, new regulations in Canada increased the size of tobacco warnings to cover three-quarters of cigarette packaging. As of November 2010, 39 countries have adopted similar legislation.

In February 2011, the Canadian government passed regulations requiring cigarette packaging to contain 12 new images to cover three quarters of the outside panel and eight new health messages on the inside panel with full color.

As of April 2011, Australian regulations require all packaging to use a bland olive green that researchers determined to be the least attractive color, with 75% coverage on the front of the pack and all of the back consisting of graphic health warnings. The only feature that differentiates one brand from another is the product name in a standard color, position, font size, and style. In response to these regulations, Philip Morris International, Japan Tobacco Inc., British American Tobacco Plc., and Imperial Tobacco attempted to sue the Australian government. On August 15, 2012, the High Court of Australia dismissed the suit and made Australia the first country to introduce brand-free plain cigarette packaging with health warnings covering 90% of the back and 70% of the front packaging. This took effect on December 1, 2012.

Similar policies have since been introduced in the United Kingdom, where standardised packaging of tobacco products regulations (SPOT) were introduced in 2015. These regulations were also challenged by cigarette manufacturers.

=== Prohibition of tobacco ===
A few countries have outlawed tobacco completely or made plans to do so. In 2004, Bhutan became the first country in the world to completely outlaw the cultivation, harvesting, production, and sale of tobacco and tobacco products. Enforcement of the prohibition increased with the passage of the Tobacco Control Act of Bhutan 2010. However, small allowances for personal possession are permitted as long as the possessors can prove that they have paid import duties. The Pitcairn Islands had previously banned the sale of cigarettes, but it now permits sales from a government-run store. The Pacific island of Niue hopes to become the next country to prohibit the sale of tobacco as of 2008. Iceland is also proposing banning tobacco sales from shops, making it prescription-only and therefore dispensable only in pharmacies on doctor's orders. Singapore and the Australian state of Tasmania have proposed a 'tobacco free millennium generation initiative' by banning the sale of all tobacco products to anyone born in and after the year 2000.

In March 2012, Brazil became the world's first country to ban all flavored tobacco including menthols. It also banned the majority of the estimated 600 additives used, permitting only eight. This regulation applies to domestic and imported cigarettes. Tobacco manufacturers had 18 months to remove noncompliant cigarettes, and 24 months to remove other forms of noncompliant tobacco. Under sharia law, the consumption of cigarettes by Muslims is prohibited.

== Environmental impact ==
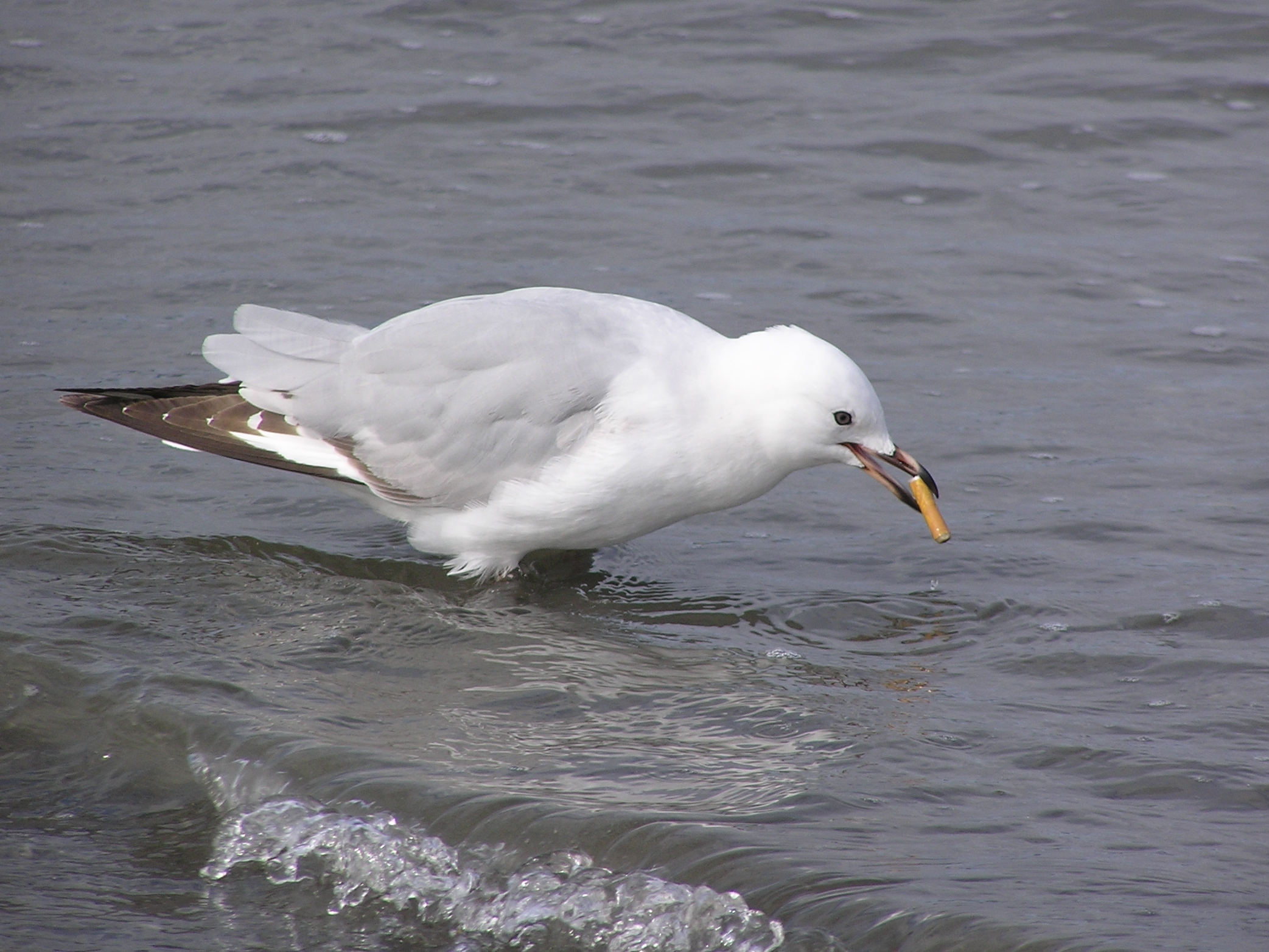
Juvenile red-billed gull

Cigarette filters are made up of thousands of polymer chains of cellulose acetate. Once discarded into the environment, the filters create a large waste problem. Cigarette filters are the most common form of litter in the world, as approximately 5.6 trillion cigarettes are smoked every year worldwide. Of those, an estimated 4.5 trillion cigarette filters become litter every year.

Disposable electronic cigarettes, also known as disposable vapes, have been linked to numerous environmental concerns. The single-use devices are seen as convenient, but have been found to create waste due to their complex composition and the difficulties inherent in recycling mixed materials, especially those with lithium batteries. Disposable e-cigarettes can contribute to environmental pollution through the potential release of toxic substances such as high amounts of lithium metal.

== Consumption ==
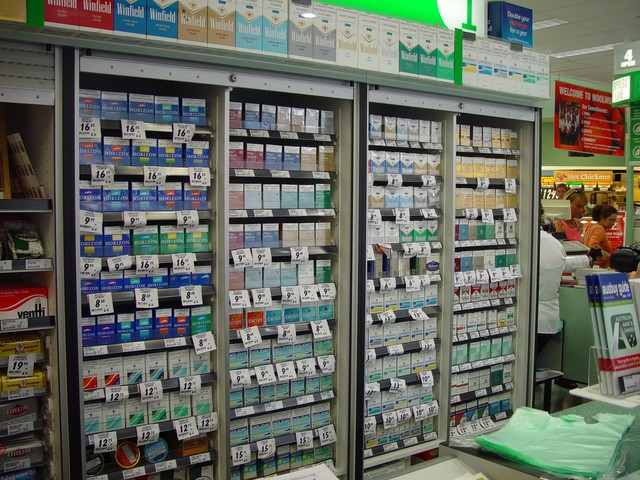
A Woolworths supermarket cigarette counter in New South Wales, Australia. In January 2011, Australia prohibited the display of cigarettes in retail outlets countrywide.

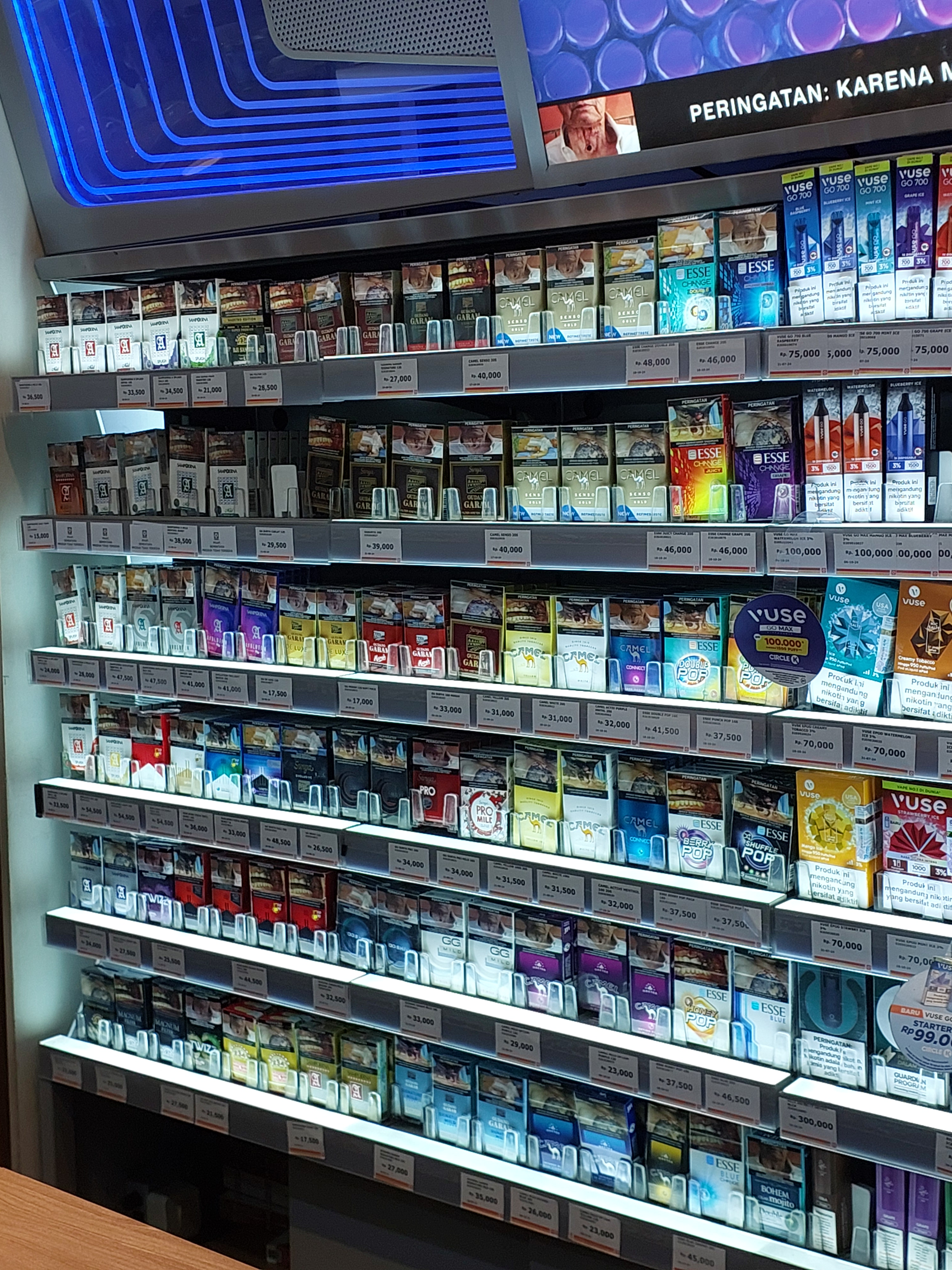
Various cigarettes being sold at a minimarket in Bumi Serpong Damai, Tangerang Regency, Indonesia

Smoking has become less popular, but is still a large public health problem globally. Worldwide, smoking rates fell from 41% in 1980 to 31% in 2012, although the actual number of smokers increased because of population growth. In 2017, 5.4 trillion cigarettes were produced globally, and were smoked by almost 1 billion people. Smoking rates have leveled off or declined in most countries, but are increasing in some low- and middle-income countries. The significant reductions in smoking rates in the United States, United Kingdom, Australia, Brazil, and other countries that implemented strong tobacco control programs have been offset by increasing consumption in low income countries, especially China. The Chinese market now consumes more cigarettes than all other low- and middle-income countries combined.

Other regions are increasingly playing larger roles in the growing global smoking epidemic. The WHO Eastern Mediterranean Region (EMRO) now has the highest growth rate in the cigarette market, with more than a one-third increase in cigarette consumption since 2000. Due to its recent dynamic economic development and continued population growth, Africa presents the greatest risk in terms of future growth in tobacco use.

Within countries, patterns of cigarette consumption also can vary widely. For example, in many of the countries where few women smoke, smoking rates are often high in males (e.g., in Asia). By contrast, in most developed countries, female smoking rates are typically only a few percentage points below those of males. In many high and middle income countries lower socioeconomic status is a strong predictor of smoking.

Smoking rates in the United States have dropped by more than half from 1965 to 2016, falling from 42% to 15.5% of US adults. Australia is cutting their overall smoking consumption faster than most of the developed world, in part due to the landmark Plain Packaging Act, which standardized the appearance of cigarette packs. Other countries have considered similar measures. In New Zealand, a bill has been presented to Parliament which the government's associate health minister said "takes away the last means of promoting tobacco as a desirable product."

Smoking prevalence by sex (ages 15 or older, 2016)
	Percent smoking	
Region	Men	Women
Africa	18%	2%
Americas	21%	12%
Eastern Mediterranean	34%	2%
Europe	38%	21%
Southeast Asia	32%	2%
Western Pacific	46%	3%

Leading consumers of cigarettes (2016)
Country	Population (millions)	Cigarettes consumed (billions)	Cigarettes consumed (per capita)
China	1,386	2,351	2,043
Indonesia	264	316	1,675
Russia	145	278	2,295
United States	327	266	1,017
Japan	127	174	1,583

Affordability cigarettes

Consumption per smoker per day

Sales of cigarettes per adult per day

== Lights ==
Some cigarettes are marketed as "lights", "milds", or "low-tar". These cigarettes were historically marketed as being less harmful, but there is no research showing that they are actually any less harmful than other types of cigarettes. The filter design is one of the main differences between light and regular cigarettes, although not all cigarettes contain perforated holes in the filter. In some light cigarettes, the filter is perforated with small holes that theoretically dilute the concentration of tobacco smoke with clean air. In regular cigarettes, the filter does not include these perforations. In ultralight cigarettes, the filter's perforations are larger. The majority of major cigarette manufacturers offer a light, low-tar, or mild cigarette brand. Due to recent U.S. legislation prohibiting the use of these descriptors, tobacco manufacturers are turning to color-coding to allow consumers to differentiate between regular and light brands.

Research shows that smoking "light" or "low-tar" cigarettes is just as harmful as smoking other cigarettes.

== Smoking cessation ==
Smoking cessation (quitting smoking) is the process of discontinuing the practice of tobacco smoking. Quitting can be difficult for many smokers due to the addictive nature of nicotine. Addiction begins when nicotine acts on nicotinic acetylcholine receptors to release neurotransmitters such as dopamine, glutamate, and gamma-aminobutyric acid. Cessation of smoking leads to symptoms of nicotine withdrawal such as anxiety and irritability. Professional smoking cessation support methods generally endeavour to address both nicotine addiction and nicotine withdrawal symptoms.

Smoking cessation can be achieved with or without assistance from healthcare professionals or the use of medications. Methods that have been found to be effective include interventions directed at or through health care providers and health care systems; medications including nicotine replacement therapy (NRT) and varenicline; individual and group counselling; and web-based or stand-alone computer programs. At the University of Buffalo, researchers found that fruit and vegetable consumption can help a smoker cut down on or even quit smoking. Although stopping smoking can cause short-term side effects such as reversible weight gain, smoking cessation services and activities are cost-effective because of their positive health benefits.

A growing number of countries have more ex-smokers than smokers. Early "failure" is a normal part of trying to stop, and more than one attempt at stopping smoking prior to longer-term success is common. NRT, other prescribed pharmaceuticals, and professional counselling or support also help many smokers. However, up to three-quarters of ex-smokers report having quit without assistance ("cold turkey" or cut down then quit), and cessation without professional support or medication may be the most common method used by ex-smokers.

The number of nicotinic receptors in the brain returns to the level of a nonsmoker between 6 and 12 weeks after quitting. In 2019, the FDA authorized the selling of low-nicotine cigarettes in hopes of lowering the number of people addicted to nicotine.

== Notable cigarette brands ==
- 555
- Amber Leaf
- Army Club
- Basic
- Benson & Hedges
- Barclay
- Camel
- Capri
- Chesterfield
- Davidoff
- Dunhill
- Djarum
- Dji Sam Soe
- Doral
- du Maurier
- Eclipse
- Embassy
- Eve
- Export
- Fatima
- Fortuna
- Fortune International
- Gauloises
- Gitanes
- Gold Flake
- Golden Virginia
- Gold Leaf
- Kyriazi Freres
- Kent
- Kool
- Lambert and Butler
- L&M
- Lark
- Lucky Strike
- Marlboro
- Mayfair
- Merit
- Mild Seven
- More
- Nat Sherman
- Natural American Spirit
- Newport
- Next
- Nil
- Old Gold
- Pall Mall
- Parliament
- Peter Stuyvesant
- Peter Jackson
- Philip Morris
- Player's
- Prince
- Salem
- Sampoerna
- Senior Service
- Sobranie
- Sterling
- Surya
- Tareyton
- Vantage
- Viceroy
- Virginia Slims
- West
- Woodbine
- Winfield
- Winston

== See also ==
- List of tobacco-related topics
- Tobacco industry
- History of commercial tobacco in the United States
  - Altria, the current name
    - Philip Morris USA the original name
  - American Tobacco Company
  - Liggett Group
  - R. J. Reynolds Tobacco Company
- List of additives in cigarettes
- List of cigarette smoke carcinogens
- Smoking culture
- Tobacco smoking
- List of countries by cigarette consumption per capita

Similar products

- Beedi
- Cigar
- Cigarillo
- Electronic cigarette
- Herbal cigarette
- Kretek
- Papirosa
- Shag

== Sources ==
- Cox H (2000). The Global Cigarette: Origins and Evolution of British American Tobacco, 1880-1945. Oxford University Press. ISBN 978-0-19-829221-0.
- "E-Cigarette Use Among Youth and Young Adults: A Report of the Surgeon General" (PDF). United States Department of Health and Human Services. Surgeon General of the United States. 2016. pp. 1–298. Archived (PDF) from the original on October 9, 2022.
- "Electronic nicotine delivery systems" (PDF). World Health Organization. July 21, 2014. pp. 1–13.
- Wilder N, Daley C, Sugarman J, Partridge J (April 2016). "Nicotine without smoke: Tobacco harm reduction". Royal College of Physicians. UK. pp. 1–191. Archived from the original on May 5, 2016.
