= Philip Morris USA =

American tobacco company

- Type: Subsidiary
- Industry: Tobacco
- Founded: 1902; 124 years ago
- Headquarters: Richmond, Virginia
- Area served: United States
- Products: Cigarettes
- Brands: Marlboro; Benson & Hedges; Chesterfield; L&M; Philip Morris; Virginia Slims; Merit; Parliament; Alpine; Basic; Cambridge; Bucks; Dave's
- Parent: Altria Group

Philip Morris USA is an American tobacco company. They are a division of the American tobacco corporation Altria Group. It has been the leading cigarette manufacturer in the U.S. since the late 20th century. Its major brands include Marlboro, Virginia Slims, Benson & Hedges, Merit, and Parliament.

The company was incorporated in New York City in 1902 as Philip Morris & Co. Ltd. In 1919 George J. Whelan, along with fellow shareholders Reuben M. Ellis and Leonard B. McKitterick, acquired the American division of the company and created Philip Morris & Co. Ltd., Inc. In the 1950s it introduced innovations such as the flip-top box and cigarette filters. In 1972, it became the leading cigarette manufacturer in the United States in terms of sales, a position it continued to hold. In March 2008, Philip Morris International was split from Philip Morris USA.

== History ==
=== Creation ===
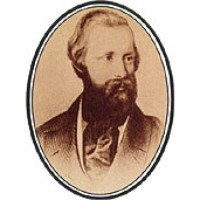
Philip Morris

The company's namesake Philip Morris was born in Whitechapel, London, in 1835, the son of a recent immigrant from Germany who had taken the name Bernard Morris. In 1847, the family opened a shop in London. Philip Morris cigarettes were first made in 1854, known as "Philip Morris English Ovals," a non-filter brand of oval-shaped cigarettes that were manufactured in very limited quantities until discontinuation in 2017.

=== Early years ===
In 1902, Philip Morris & Co. Ltd. was incorporated in New York City. George J. Whelan bought the American division of the company in 1919 and created Philip Morris & Co. Ltd., Inc., along with fellow shareholders Reuben M. Ellis and Leonard B. McKitterick.

In 1929, the company made its first cigarettes in Richmond, Virginia, using an existing factory the company purchased. In 1933, this factory was racially integrated more than 30 years before the law required it. In 1938, the company offered preferred stock to ordinary buyers.

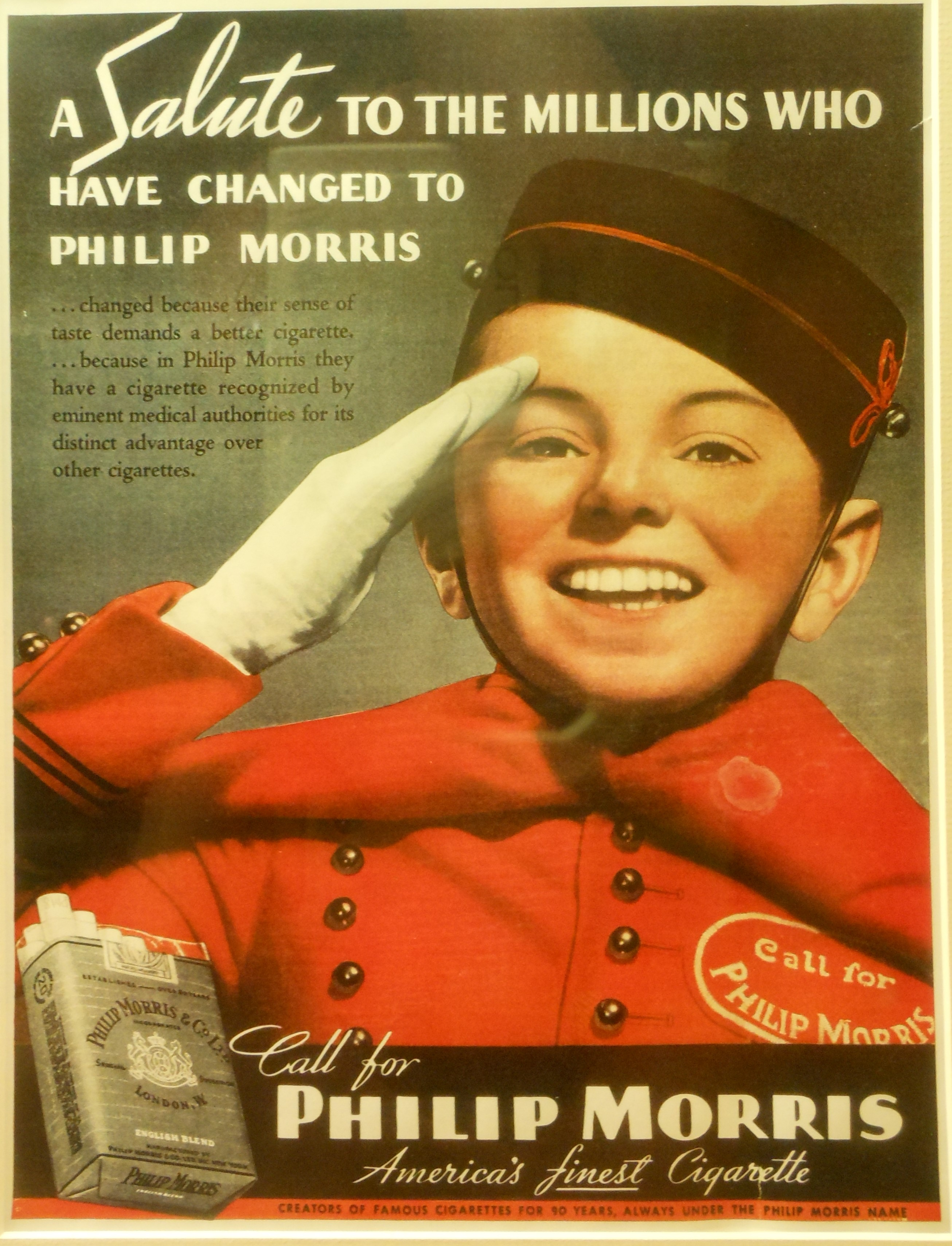
Philip Morris advertisement, portrayed by Johnny Roventini

In 1924, Philip Morris began advertising Marlboros specifically to women. The cigarettes had "new cork-tip filters housed in a flip-top box with a red roof design."

=== Radio and television sponsorship ===
In 1933, the company and its advertising agency, Milton Biow, searched for a "living trademark" to represent their brand, and chose Johnny Roventini, a midget bellhop at the Hotel New Yorker. Roventini called out the catchphrase "Call for Philip Morris!" in live appearances, and on the radio. The Philip Morris-backed radio programs, including, It Pays to Be Ignorant, The Kate Smith Hour and This Is Your Life, all began with the phrase "Johnny presents", and Roventini's "Call for Philip Morris!"

From 1951 to 1955, Philip Morris sponsored the CBS sitcom I Love Lucy, with Lucille Ball and Desi Arnaz pitching the product often, and Philip Morris controlling the content of the program. In 1955, Philip Morris became an alternate sponsor with Procter & Gamble, eventually bowing out altogether by the end of that year.

=== Acquisitions ===
In 1970, Philip Morris made the first of several acquisitions with the purchase of Miller Brewing Company. In 1985, Philip Morris Companies Inc. became a holding company and the parent of Philip Morris Inc. and bought General Foods. The acquisition of Kraft Foods came in 1988, after which Kraft and General Foods became Kraft General Foods.

Although it had begun investing in the homebuilder by 1969, Philip Morris purchased Southern California's Mission Viejo Company in its entirety for $52 million during 1972. Philip Morris continued to hold on to this investment until 1997, finally selling the division off to J.F. Shea Company.

In the 1970s, in response to smokers' health concerns, Philip Morris introduced the "Light" cigarette — which was later found to be no safer than any others.

In 1976, Marlboro became the leading brand in the U.S.; Morris operated as the largest seller of tobacco in the U.S. and the second-largest in the world.

In 2001, Kraft Foods launched an initial public offering (IPO) for 11.1% of the company that took in $8.7 billion, making it the second-largest IPO in American history at the time.

In 2002, Miller Brewing and South African Breweries became SABMiller, the second-largest maker of beer in the world, though Philip Morris kept an interest in the merged company.

=== Altria ===
On January 27, 2003, Philip Morris Companies Inc. changed its name to Altria Group, Inc. Even under this new name, Altria continues to own 100% of Philip Morris USA (abbreviated PM USA).

In the fall of 2003, Philip Morris USA moved its headquarters from New York City to Richmond, Virginia. On March 30, 2007, the remaining 88.9% stake in Kraft Foods was spun off to shareholders. Philip Morris International was split from Philip Morris USA in March 2008. This has caused a drop in the needed cigarette production due to no need for export product. Philip Morris shut down its Concord, North Carolina, manufacturing facility in 2010 and moved all domestic production to Richmond, which now contains the largest Philip Morris plant in the world, producing 146 billion cigarettes in 2010.

In 2010, the FDA banned the use of "Light" for ventilated cigarettes because it misrepresented the products as a healthier cigarette, and Philip Morris switched to using colors to brand them to circumvent the rule.

== Brands ==
Philip Morris USA brands include Marlboro, Virginia Slims, Benson & Hedges, Merit, Parliament, Alpine, Basic, Cambridge, Bucks, Dave's, Chesterfield, Collector's Choice, Commander, Lark, L&M, and Players. As of December 27, 2018, Philip Morris also owns a minority stake in JUUL.

== Criminal activities ==
In 1994, CEO William Campbell lied under oath to Congress about the addictive properties of nicotine, while knowing that cigarettes caused negative health effects to consumers.

== See also ==
- Altria
- Marlboro
- Marlboro Friday
- Philip Morris International
- Johnny Roventini (spokesperson & "living trademark")
- Tobacco industry
- Tobacco Master Settlement Agreement
