= Marlboro Friday =

1993 price cut to Marlboro cigarettes

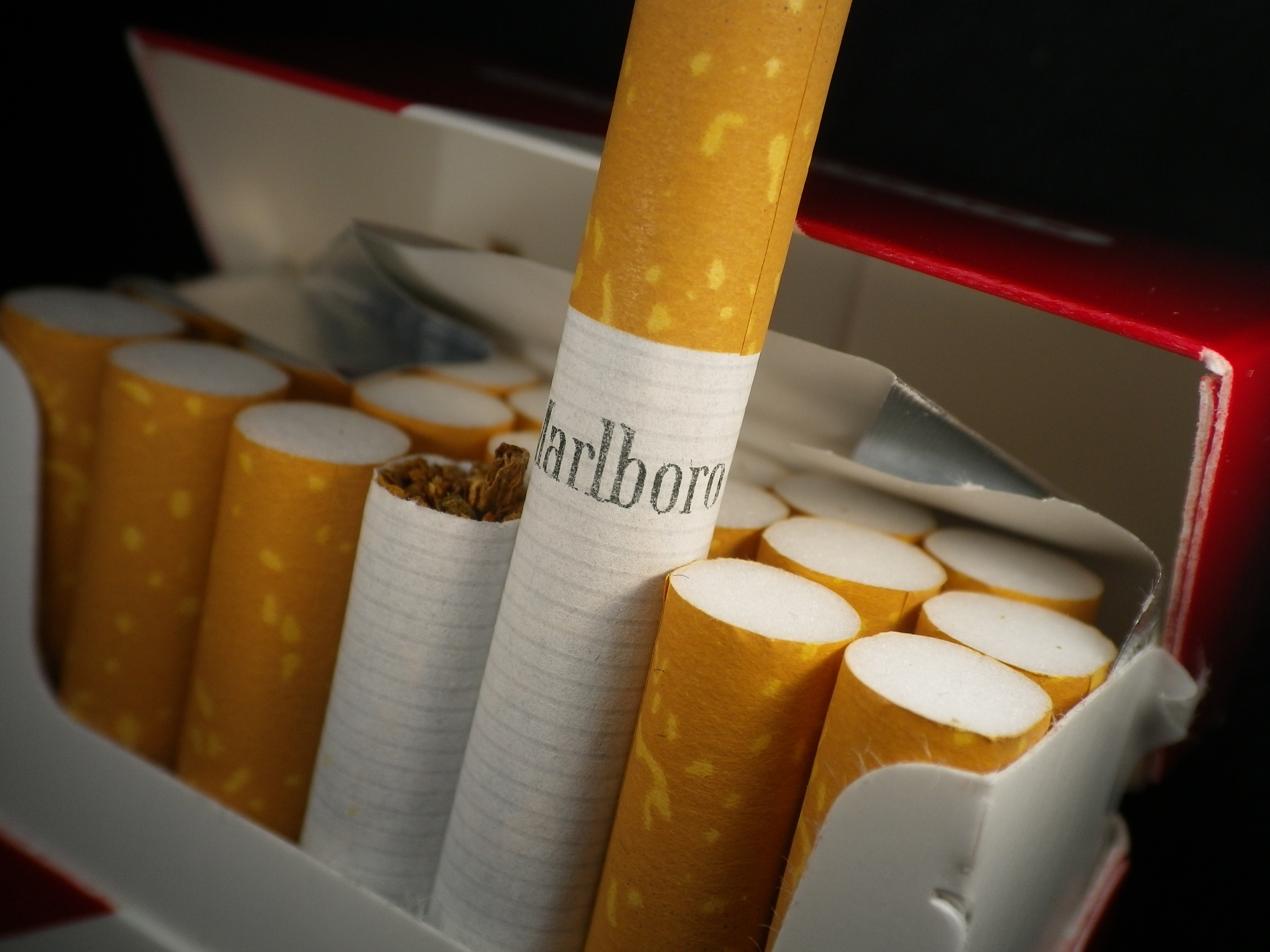
Marlboro cigarettes in a pack

Marlboro Friday refers to April 2, 1993, when Philip Morris announced a 20% price cut to their Marlboro cigarettes to fight back against generic competitors, which were increasingly eating into their market share.

As a result, Philip Morris's stock fell 26%, and the share value of other branded consumer product companies, including Coca-Cola and RJR Nabisco, fell as well. The broad index fell 1.98% that day. Fortune magazine deemed Marlboro Friday "the day the Marlboro Man fell off his horse." Philip Morris investors interpreted the price slash as an admission of defeat from the Marlboro brand, evidence that Philip Morris could no longer justify its higher price tag and now had to compete with generic brands.

At the time, this event was regarded as signifying "the death of a brand" and the advent of a "value-minded" consumer generation who pay more attention to the real value of products and not the brand names. This view soon proved to be incorrect, with the rest of the decade's economy as well as the 2000s to present being dominated by brands and driven by high-budget marketing campaigns.
