= Ken Wright (auto racing mechanic) =

American auto racing mechanic (born 1940)

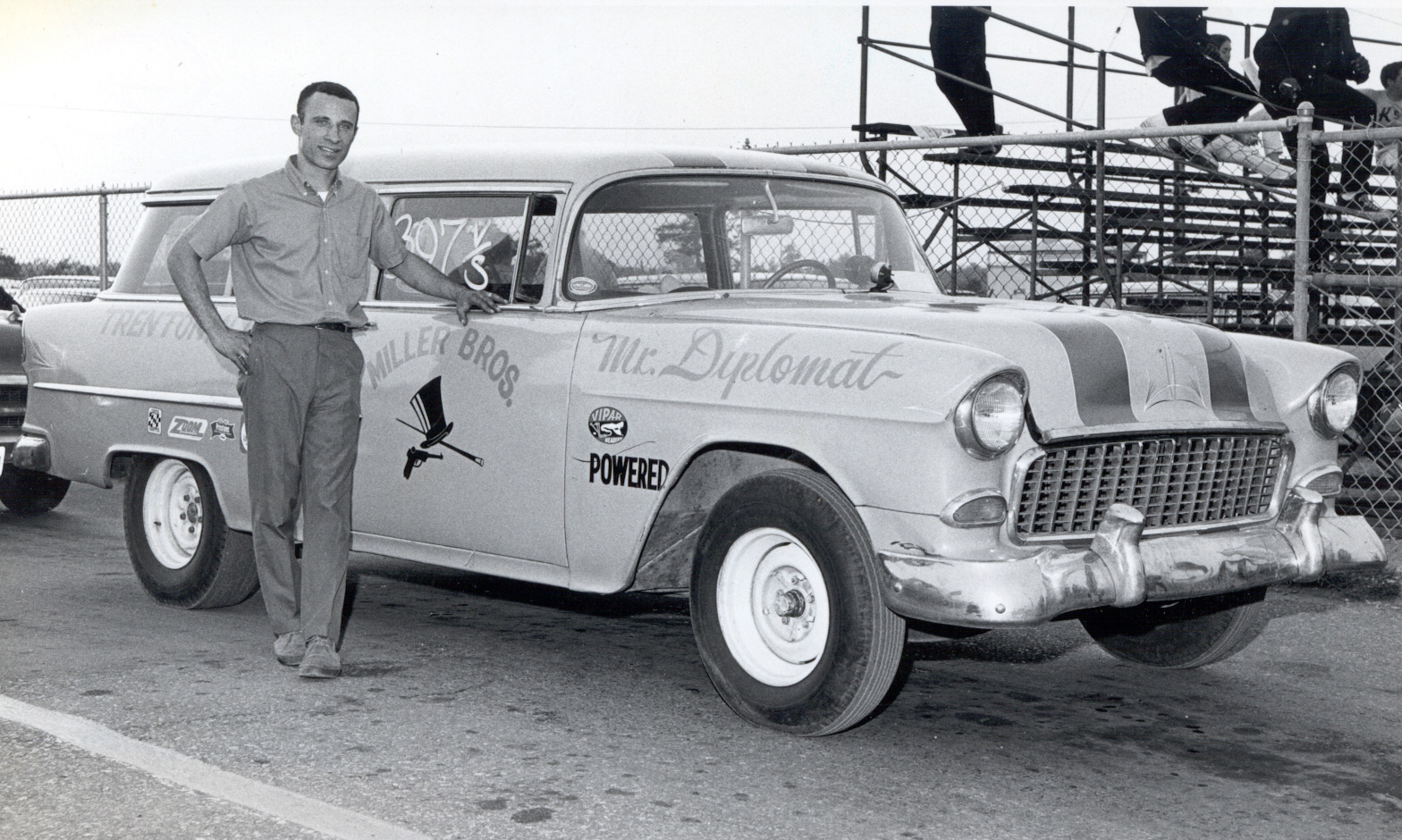
- Wright in 1970 with Mr. Diplomat, the Miller Brothers 1955 Chevy station wagon drag racer
- Born: Kenneth W. Wright; 1940 (age 85–86); Bryn Mawr, Pennsylvania, US
- Education: Spring Garden College
- Occupations: Race car driver; mechanic

Kenneth W. Wright (born 1940) is a former race car driver and mechanic for, among other teams, Black American Racers, Inc. (BAR), the first African American auto racing team to acquire national sponsorship in the United States.

== Early years ==
Wright's friendship with the Miller brothers—Dexter G. and Leonard W.—began at age five. His love of hot rods and race cars began in earnest at age 13, when Leonard would visit his community in a 1940 Ford hot rod convertible. Riding in the car and seeing the advanced modifications made to the motor, sparked Wright's interest in becoming a full-time automotive technician after graduating from Conestoga High School in Berwyn, Pennsylvania. He took every auto class offered in the school.

In 1956, Wright co-founded the Black Hawk Auto Club, with Horace “Buddy” Sparrow and other African American youth living in the Mt. Pleasant neighborhood of Wayne, Pennsylvania. In 1957, a trip with the club to the York Dragway in York, Pennsylvania piqued his interest in becoming a drag racer.

After high school, he began his apprenticeship training at Sharpless Auto Body in Devon, Pennsylvania, where he learned all aspects of automotive collision repair. After learning the basics, he attended the Spring Garden College in Philadelphia, along with Dexter Miller. He graduated in 1962. After graduation he was employed at Horsiey's Automotive Service Center in Narberth, Pennsylvania.

In the midst of the Civil Rights Movement and the Vietnam War, Wright's skills were extremely rare among African Americans. He was one of only a few to hold jobs in the auto body trade at a mainstream facility in one of the wealthiest regions of America. Citizens in the community, including African Americans, would note Wright's capacity at every pass.

== Education career ==
In 1966, Wright joined the School District of Philadelphia, where he taught automotive collision repair to adults aged 18–35 at the John F. Kennedy Center for Vocational Education. While employed by the district, he obtained a B.S. in education from Temple University in 1979. He retired from the district in 2002.

== Race car driver ==
In 1969–70, Wright drove a National Hot Rod Association (NHRA) 1955 Chevrolet station wagon to dozens of track victories for Miller Brothers Racing at Atco Dragway in Atco, New Jersey, Englishtown Raceway Park in Englishtown, New Jersey, McGuire Air Force Base drag strip in Burlington County, New Jersey, and the Maple Grove Raceway in Mohnton, Pennsylvania.

== Black American Racers Association (BARA) ==
When Leonard W. Miller helped launch the Black American Racers Association (BARA) in 1972, Wright became a charter member. Through this unique group, which comprised 5,000 African American auto racers from coast to coast and encompassed drag racing teams, mechanics, car collectors, and participants in Sports Car Club of America (SCCA) sports car competition, Wright met Ron Hines, a founding member of BARA, and African American NASCAR legend Wendell Scott.

== Road racing mechanic ==
In 1973, Wright and Hines joined forces with Miller's Brown & Williamson Tobacco (Viceroy Cigarettes)-sponsored Black American Racers, Inc. (BAR) team that fielded second-generation African American driver Benny Scott in Formula Super Vee (FSV) road racing on circuits such as Pocono Raceway, Lime Rock Park, Watkins Glen International, and Road Atlanta.

Ken Wright's broad base of other technical skills, including painting, welding, tuning motors, rebuilding transmissions and rear ends, and complete suspension work, transferred readily to BAR's initiatives. Wright prepared the Lola T-324 and T-620. He became a loyalist of the team and was critical to its extraordinary milestones through the 1970s - a period some call “the last decade of the golden era of American road racing.”

Wright remained on the BAR team after Viceroy's unmatched sponsorship expired in late 1975. He was a VIP guest for Benny Scott's and Leonard W. Miller's induction into the Black Athletes Hall of Fame at the New York Hilton in Manhattan in 1976. The event's master of ceremonies was actor Bill Cosby. Celebrities among the more than 1000 attendees at the formal extravaganza included African American female track star Wilma Rudolph, legendary soul singer James Brown, boxing promoter Don King, ABC television sports commentator Howard Cosell, and boxing legend Jersey Joe Walcott.

Leonard W. Miller started an independent effort in FSV racing after African American driver Tommy Thompson persuaded him to continue the BAR concept in 1977. Ken Wright was a critical component of that team, helping it advance to an SCCA Northeast Championship at Pocono Raceway in Pennsylvania.

The team, including Ken Wright, traveled to the Milwaukee Mile to race on the famed one-mile oval. FSV racing transitioned into the Mini-Indy series, where select races were paired with Indy Car events held on popular oval courses under the United States Auto Club (USAC). Wright also traveled to Texas World Speedway in College Station, Texas and other FSV races around the country that BAR entered.

At a Mini-Indy event on September 27, 1978, Tommy Thompson was killed in a crash coming off the fourth turn at the 1.5-mile kidney bean-shaped Trenton Speedway, when a competitor abruptly stopped in front of him, due to a catastrophic mechanical failure.

== Retirement ==
Ken Wright retired from hands-on mechanical race car preparation after Thompson's death, working instead with recreational motor boats and restoring his 1961 Chevrolet Corvette.

For two years BAR did not compete in auto racing, then it started afresh in grassroots competition under other names. Ken Wright remained a booster for the team, but Ron Hines emerged from retirement in 1980 to catapult BAR into several dirt track victories with his superior engine knowledge at the Flemington Speedway in Flemington, New Jersey with 19-year-old African American driver Bruce Driver.

In later years Miller Racing Group, Inc. became the solid outgrowth of BAR, recruiting African American grassroots stock car drivers for NASCAR competition in the Southeast and a Jamaican driver for Formula BMW Americas from 1990 to the present. Leonard W. Miller's son, Leonard T. Miller, has been a significant element in those efforts.

Ken Wright, Ron Hines, and Leonard W. Miller remain in close contact, attending and entering classic car shows and competitions around the United States.
