= Ron Hines =

American auto racing engineer (born 1940)

Ron Hines (born 1940) was the first black Ivy League-educated auto racing engineer on America's road racing circuits. He was an engineer for Black American Racers, Inc. (BAR), the first black auto racing team to attain national sponsorship in America, in the 1970s.

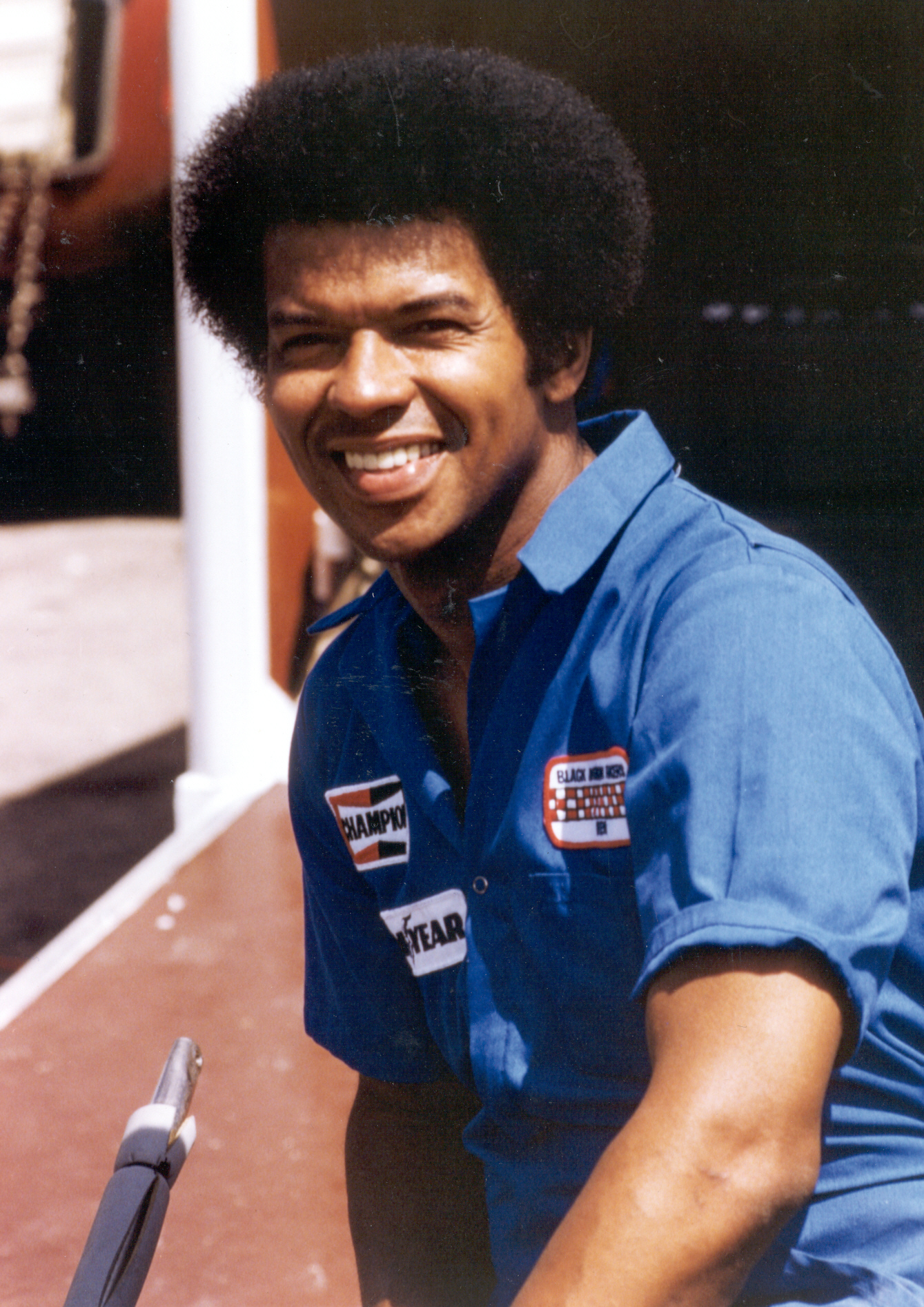
African American auto racing pioneer Ron Hines

== Early years ==
Ron Hines was raised in New Rochelle, New York. His interest in automobiles began as a teenager. At age 14, he bought a partially finished 1948 Plymouth coupe with a chopped top. Knowing he was too young to own and drive a car, Hines's father discarded it while Ron was away at boarding school. At 16, Hines bought a four-door 1949 Mercury with a chopped top. Once again, his father was reluctant to let him keep the car. Hines was told he was still too young to drive legally in the state of New York.

== Elite education ==
At Phillips Academy in Andover, Massachusetts he roomed with John Cox, a car enthusiast from Terre Haute, Indiana. Hines's love of cars was solidified when Cox showed him a Rod & Custom magazine article featuring a 1934 Ford five-window coupe.

In 1963, Hines graduated from the University of Pennsylvania in Philadelphia with a degree in mechanical engineering. In his senior year he met Ennis Dawson, a local drag racer who became a lifelong friend. Attending local drag races with Dawson rekindled Hines's passion for cars. As a result, he bought a 1953 Studebaker coupe and installed a 364-cubic-inch Buick motor and a four-speed transmission. After engaging in a number of dangerous street races, Hines entered his car in sanctioned National Hot Rod Association (NHRA) meets at the Strato Rods Dragway on the McGuire Air Force Base in Wrightstown, New Jersey.

After graduating from the University of Pennsylvania, Hines was hired by General Motors as a quality control engineer at the manufacturer's Trenton, New Jersey facility. In 1966 he purchased a 1933 five-window Ford coupe hot rod. He still owns the Ford, which has been transformed several times into a trophy-winning drag racer, a wild street machine, and a classic street rod. The 1933 Ford currently has a detuned 302-cubic-inch Formula 5000 racing engine installed from one of the Lola T332 road racers that Benny Scott drove for Black American Racers, Inc. in 1975.

== Black American Racers Association ==
In 1972 Hines met Leonard W. Miller, whose vision was to organize the black racing community into a national association. Hines, Miller, Eugene Gadson, and Charlie Singleton founded the Black American Racers Association (BARA). Hines was BARA's secretary for the five years of its existence, responsible for publishing its monthly newsletter. In 1974, Hines wrote half of the articles contained in the ’74 Black Racers Yearbook. The annual covered pre-World War II black racing history, as well as practical articles for black racers on how to obtain sponsorship. Several Fortune 500 companies placed advertisements in the yearbook.

== Road racing engineer ==
In 1973, Hines became a crew member of Miller's road racing team, with Benny Scott as driver of a redesigned Tui Formula Super Vee (FSV). The team was sponsored by Brown & Williamson Tobacco Corporation (Viceroy Cigarettes). Hines was an engineer for two other BAR drivers in the 1970s - Randy Bethea and Tommy Thompson in Sports Car Club of America (SCCA) - as well as for International Motor Sports Association (IMSA) road racing entries. The Lola chassis Hines tuned and set up for the team were the T-324 and T-620. Hines traveled to road circuits such as Lime Rock Park, Road Atlanta, Watkins Glen International, Mid-Ohio, and Road America. During this period, Hines appeared on a number of television and radio shows on the East Coast with Leonard W. Miller and Benny Scott.

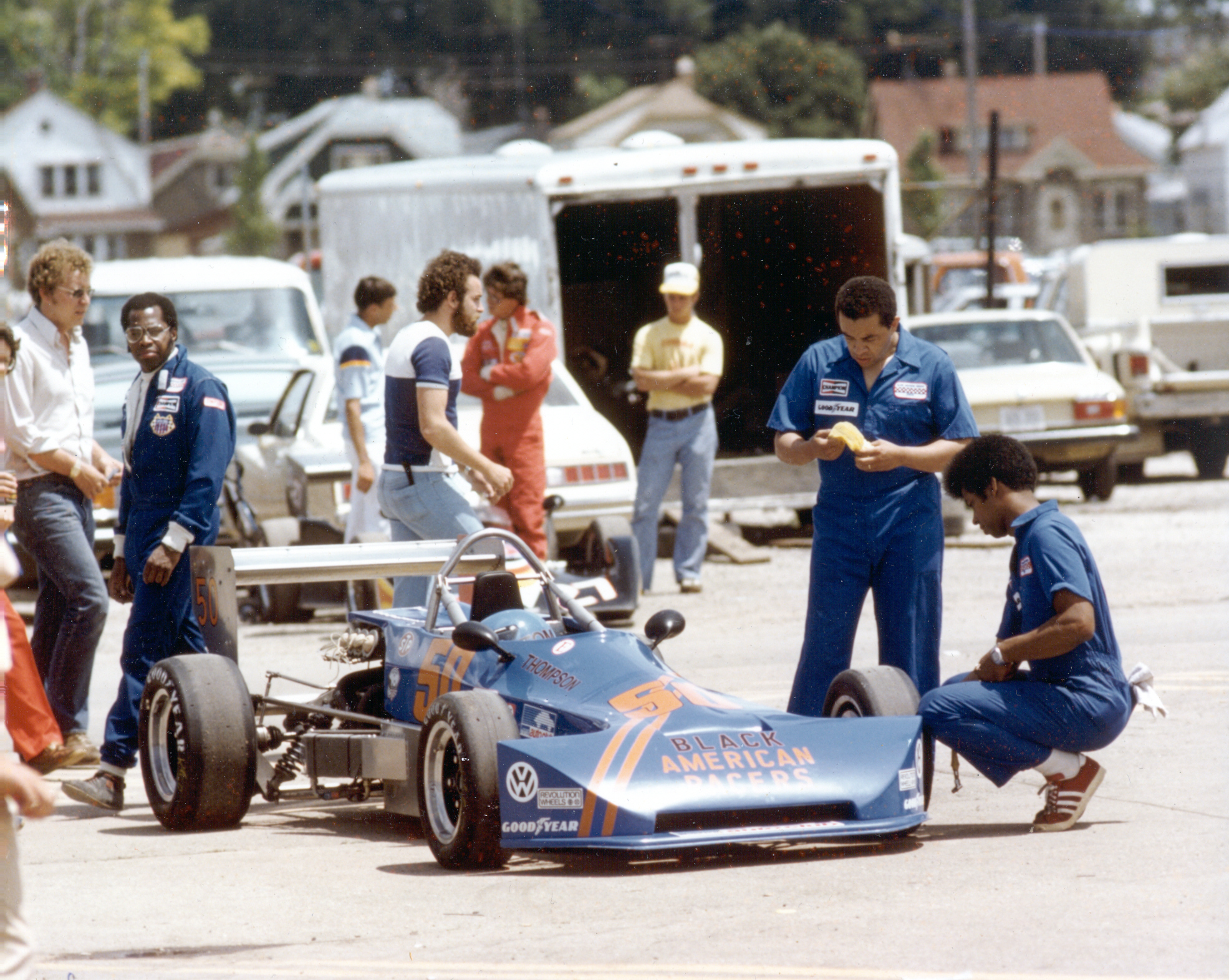
Tommy Thompson, Leonard W. Miller and Ron Hines at the Milwaukee Mile, September 1978

== Keys to the city ==
In the spring of 1974, mayor Maynard Jackson gave Hines, Miller, and Benny Scott the keys to the city of Atlanta in a ceremony at City Hall, at which he also declared April 20 Black American Racers Day. A photograph of the team appeared in newspapers and periodicals throughout the United States. The same photo was published in Miller's autobiography Silent Thunder and in Andrew L. Schupack's book Formula Vee/Super Vee-Racing, History, and Chassis/Engine Prep.

== Trenton Speedway tragedy ==
After the 1975 season BAR lost its sponsorship, along with other Viceroy teams, due to internal union pressures at Brown & Williamson Tobacco. BAR was sidelined for two years.

Leonard W. Miller commenced a second effort in FSV racing after African American driver Tommy Thompson persuaded him to continue the BAR vision in 1977. Ron Hines and Ken Wright were key technical elements of the team. Hines helped it advance to an SCCA Northeast Championship at Pocono Raceway in Pennsylvania.

On September 27, 1978, Tommy Thompson was killed in a crash exiting the fourth turn at the 1.5-mile Trenton Speedway, which is distinguished by its dogleg before turn 3. At this Mini-Indy (the new name for FSV) event, a competitor abruptly stopped in front of Thompson due to a catastrophic mechanical failure. Thompson never regained consciousness and died less than a week later.

== Second mission ==
After a two-year recovery, Ron Hines served as crew chief of the BAR dirt track team in 1980-81, with Bruce Driver as the driver. The team won ten races at speedways at Flemington Speedway and East Windsor Speedway in New Jersey. Bruce Driver became the first black driver to achieve ten victories in each track's history. BAR continued to aim for professional road racing and the Indianapolis 500, but sponsorship proposals presented to many Fortune 500 companies were declined.

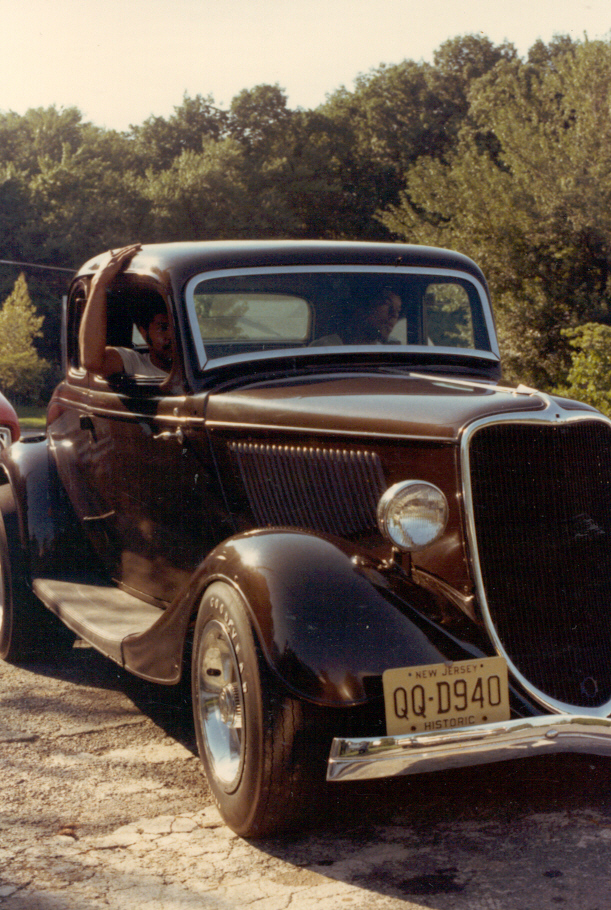
Ron Hines driving his 1933 Ford 5-window coupe street rod, circa 1974. Benny Scott is in the passenger seat.

== Retirement ==
Over the years, Ron Hines served as an instructor at the Granville Academy. He instructed and mentored minority urban youth in improving their mathematical skills for preparation as future technicians or engineers. During this period, he has owned many specialty cars. In addition to his 1933 five-window Ford coupe, he owns a 1975 Chevrolet Monza with a Ron Whitney Chevrolet small-block V-8 engine coupled with a four-speed transmission.

Ron Hines currently organizes the annual specialty car and motorcycle show at St. John's Baptist Church in Ewing Township, New Jersey. The show takes place in July in a park adjoining the church and is open to all years, makes, and models.
