= Leonard Miller =

Leonard Miller may refer to:

- Leonard W. Miller (born 1934), American motor racing pioneer
- Leonard T. Miller, his son, American racing driver, pilot and author
- Leonard J. Miller (1907–1992), politician in Newfoundland, Canada
- Leonard Miller (basketball), Canadian basketball player
- Leonard M. Miller, former president and CEO of Lennar
- Leonard Miller (born 1899), owner of the British comic book publisher L. Miller & Son, Ltd.
- Leonard M. Miller School of Medicine at the University of Miami
