= Silent Thunder: Breaking Through Cultural, Racial, and Class Barriers in Motorsports =

2004 book by Leonard W. Miller

- Author: Leonard W. Miller
- Language: English
- Subject: African-American pioneers, motorsports
- Publisher: The Red Sea Press
- Publication date: 2004
- Publication place: United States
- Media type: Print (Hardcover)
- Pages: 205
- ISBN: 1-56902-176-7
- OCLC: 52471386

Silent Thunder: Breaking Through Cultural, Racial, and Class Barriers in Motorsports (2004) is the autobiography of African-American motorsports pioneer Leonard W. Miller. It is a rare look inside an African-American man’s motor-racing experience from post-World War II into the early 1990s. Only two other auto books delve into this perspective.

== Origin ==
The author's son, Leonard T. Miller, encouraged his father to write his motor-racing memoirs in 1995, after concluding a sponsorship presentation to a Fortune 500 corporation. The presentation underscored the total lack of awareness in mainstream and corporate America of African-American auto-racing history and its marketing value.

In the winter of 1998, Leonard W. Miller began writing the manuscript; he completed it by that summer. After attending a race team test session in 1999 at Summit Point Raceway in Summit Point, West Virginia, Miller met Steve Lanier, president of American World Services, LLC, and Tracey Neale, at the time a news anchor with Fox Broadcasting Company's affiliate in Washington, D.C., who referred him to London-based editor Ethan Casey.

A few weeks later, Miller and his son met Casey at Lanier’s office in Washington and handed him the manuscript. Casey edited the manuscript in England and Pakistan over a six-month period and crafted a proposal to sell it to U.S. publishers. Miller received responses from a number of publishers. Dr. Walter Lomax introduced him to Kassahun Checole, president of The Red Sea Press in Trenton, New Jersey, and Checole offered Miller the best deal. The Red Sea Press published the book in March 2004. The work is endorsed by actor Paul Newman and by auto racing legends Mario Andretti, Janet Guthrie, Carl Haas, and Howdy Holmes.

Federal-Mogul Corporation purchased thousands of special-edition hardcover copies and distributed them to state library systems from Hawaii to Georgia, historically African-American colleges having engineering schools, the Bucks County, Pennsylvania chapter of The Links, Incorporated, Sigma Pi Phi fraternity, and the Teen Leadership Institute.

The book earned places on AutoWeek magazine’s list of the top 50 automobile books of the past 50 years and Hagerty’s magazine’s list of "Ten Great Car Books Every Collector Should Own", covering books published between 1949 and 2004.

== Synopsis ==
The book covers Miller’s interest in cars, which led him into the world of motor racing, beginning during the Great Depression. As Miller’s journey takes him through the eras of segregation, the Civil Rights Movement, the Vietnam War, and women’s rights, he manages to start driving as a drag racer, finding sanctuary and fair competition in a pure sports environment.

Miller develops a team named Black American Racers, Inc. (BAR), which fields African-American second-generation driver Benny Scott. The team endures corporate sponsorship rejection, due to prejudices and disbelief that a black team could be competitive in auto racing. After securing sponsorship from Brown & Williamson Tobacco Corporation, BAR enters Formula Super Vee and Formula 5000 races on America’s road racing circuits. The team makes it to the inaugural Long Beach Grand Prix in 1975. Nevertheless, after two years, Brown & Williamson ends its sponsorship programs around the world in auto racing, and BAR is unable to replace the sponsorship. This leads Miller to field a team independently with African-American driver Tommy Thompson, who lost his life in a race in 1978. Subsequently, Miller has continued to field teams in NASCAR. Challenges similar to those he faced during the civil rights eras have continued to resurface, and Miller describes these in the book.

The story's uniqueness lies in the social challenges Miller encounters that directly affects events on the actual racetrack. He also weaves in intriguing references to his contact with the CIA, his service in the United States Army, aviation, motion pictures, celebrities, and sports icons.

Leonard W. Miller was inducted into the Black Athletes Hall of Fame, along with driver Benny Scott, in 1976.
