= Silent Thunder =

Silent Thunder may refer to:

- Silent Thunder: A-10 Tank Killer II, a 1996 video game
- Silent Thunder: Breaking Through Cultural, Racial, and Class Barriers in Motorsports, a 2004 autobiography of Leonard W. Miller
- Silent Thunder: In the Presence of Elephants, a 1998 book by Katy Payne
- Silent Thunder, a 2014 novel by Archie Macpherson
