= Leonard W. Miller =

American racing driver (born 1934)

Leonard W. Miller (born 1934) is one of two black motor racing pioneers living in the United States.

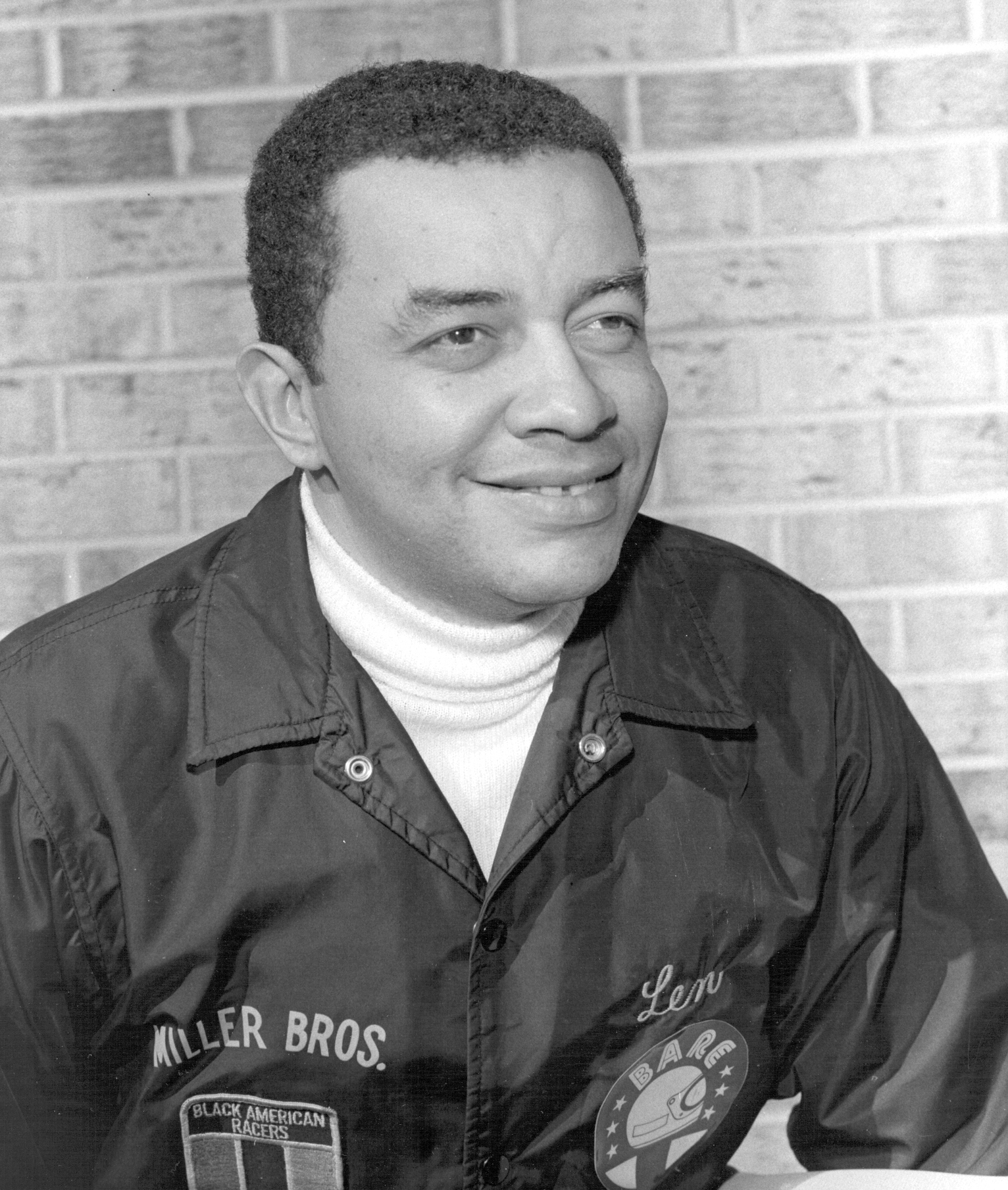
African American auto racing pioneer Leonard W. Miller

== Early life ==
Miller was born in Philadelphia, Pennsylvania and raised in its suburbs. His lifelong love of automobiles began at age five in 1939, and he began secretly tinkering with his family’s 1937 Ford in 1948. He built an advanced 1940 Ford club coupe hotrod convertible in 1953. As a charter member of George Barris’s Kustoms of America based in Southern California, he ordered custom parts from Barris to complete his project in Pennsylvania.

Because of his knowledge of automobiles, Miller was assigned to the United States Third Army’s 45th Ordnance Battalion, Direct Automotive Support Company in 1957. This one-of-a-kind company was trained to repair jeeps and trucks under battlefield conditions and consisted of hot-rodders, drag racers, United Auto Workers assembly line workers and NASCAR racers.

Miller was mentored by Mel Leighton and Sumner “Red” Oliver, two black racing pioneers of the 1920s-1940s. These relationships, and friendships with Wendell Scott and Malcolm Durham, helped propel Miller and African American driver Benny Scott to many achievements racing under the Black American Racers, Inc. (BAR) and Vanguard Racing, Inc. banners in the 1970s.

== Indy Car owner ==
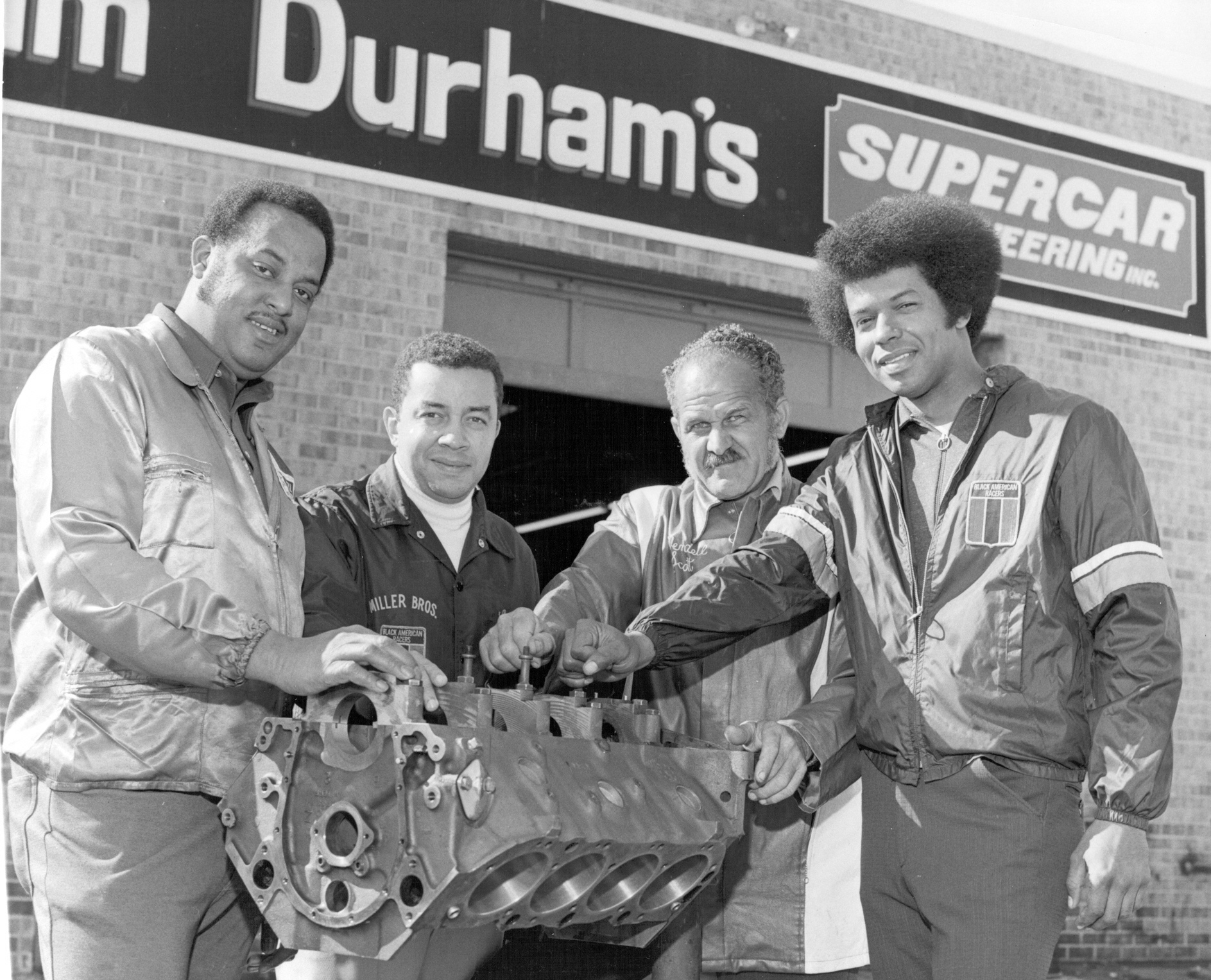
Malcolm Durham, Leonard W. Miller, Wendell Scott, and Ronald Hines (l-r) of the Black American Racers Association

In 1972, Vanguard Racing became the first black-owned team to enter a car in the Indianapolis 500, with John Mahler as the driver. Vanguard’s concept was to employ Mahler as a development coach to help prepare Benny Scott for the Indianapolis 500 in subsequent years.

Scott drove Vanguard’s Formula A, in a McLaren M10-A, powered with a 500-horsepower Chevrolet V-8 in the L & M Continental 5000 Championship and Sports Car Club of America (SCCA) events. Scott won the CSCC-SCCA Southern Pacific Division Championship in 1972, outperforming drivers traveling from as far away as Australia to compete.

Vanguard’s board of directors consisted of Paul Jackson, president of Jackson & Sanders Construction Company; Robert Sargent Shriver, Jr., first head of the Peace Corps and former Ambassador to France, who would be the Democratic Party's candidate for Vice President of the United States in 1972; Washington Redskins defensive halfback Brig Owens; and Richard Deutsch, board chairman of Harbor Oil Corporation.

Unfortunately for the team's ambitions, Vanguard’s stockholders were euphoric with John Mahler’s performance at the 1972 Indianapolis 500, and as a result they lost their patience and ambition to groom Benny Scott.

== Organizing black racers ==
Miller was also the founder, in 1972, of the Black American Racers Association (BARA). At its height, BARA boasted 5,000 members from 20 states. Wendell Scott was the first honorary chairman. Ron Hines, a University of Pennsylvania-trained mechanical engineer, served as secretary and race team mechanic. Today, former BARA members from Maryland, Washington, DC, and Virginia are carrying on the original objectives as the Quartermasters Drag Racing Team.

== Black American Racers ==
In 1973, Miller formed Black American Racers, Inc. (BAR) from his offices on West State Street in Trenton, New Jersey. BAR secured sponsorship from Brown & Williamson Tobacco Corporation (Viceroy Cigarettes), as part of an initiative called “Road To Indy.” This stairstep scheme put Scott in Formula Super Vee (FSV) competition in SCCA, International Motor Sports Association (IMSA), and the Robert Bosch Gold Cup series on road circuits from coast to coast including Watkins Glen International, Lime Rock Park, Mid-Ohio, Laguna Seca Raceway, Road America, and Pocono Raceway.

Scott achieved several podium finishes in Lola T-324 FSV’s purchased from legendary Carl Haas Automobile Imports. At Laguna Seca Raceway in Monterey, California on May 4, 1975, he was the fastest qualifier, but on the final lap of the race itself Scott was barely beaten in a photo finish by Fred Phillips in his Eldon Mk 14B.

== BAR driver development ==
In 1973 Miller and Scott devised a driver development program for BAR, before it became widespread in American motor racing, motivated by a question Miller was asked often by potential sponsors in corporate America: What if your primary black driver is killed?

To eliminate this dilemma, Miller signed Coyle Peek, a 23-year-old African American driver from Long Island, New York. Peek was a Formula Ford (FF) driver. Miller placed Peek with S.H.A.R.P Racing Limited in the United Kingdom to aid his development in the most competitive entry-level road racing series in the world: British Formula Ford.

Under the BAR banner, Peek competed in a British-manufactured Royale RP16 chassis powered by a 1600cc engine at world-famous British circuits such as Brands Hatch, the Silverstone Circuit, and Mallory Park. Peek competed against FF chassis types such as Meryln 17a and 20a, Macon MR6, Lotus 51, 61, 61M, Van Diemen FA73, and the Bradley FF.

Coyle Peek progressed rapidly, finishing in the top 10 in most races, with a second-place finish as his highest. He quickly earned the post as a reserve driver in case Benny Scott were to be injured or killed competing for BAR in FSV. After he returned to the US, Peek attended many of BAR’s events. Miller tried to acquire a companion race car and sponsorship for Peek, but it was denied in corporate boardrooms.

Miller is the first documented African American team principal to dispatch an African American driver across the North Atlantic for professional race car driving development supported by his own means.

== Long Beach Grand Prix ==
Brown & Williamson Tobacco expedited BAR’s promotion into Formula 5000 events, with Benny Scott competing at speeds over 200 mph with racing legends such as Great Britain’s Brian Redman, South Africa’s Jody Scheckter, Mario Andretti, and Chris Amon of New Zealand.

BAR qualified for the inaugural Long Beach Grand Prix on September 28, 1975, an invitation-only event for the top 60 race teams in the world. Scott qualified the BAR’s Lola T332 entry 24th out of the 30 teams that qualified for the race. Scott finished the race in 11th place. Grant King was BAR’s chief mechanic for all the Formula 5000 races the team entered in 1975.

Although BAR’s Long Beach Grand Prix performance demonstrated its ability to qualify the first African American driver for the Indianapolis 500 in the mid-1970s, Brown & Williamson Tobacco Corporation terminated all of its motor racing sponsorships in November 1975 for business reasons. BAR approached several other Fortune 500 companies to continue its “Fast Road to Indianapolis” effort, without success.

Willy T. Ribbs, who was inspired to become a professional race car driver by his father’s interaction with Miller's and Scott's trailblazing accomplishments at California race tracks, qualified for the Indianapolis 500 in 1991 and 1993, but was also challenged by insufficient corporate sponsorship to sustain his efforts. The sponsorship challenge continues to plague all African American motor racing efforts, into the 21st century.

== Hall of Fame ==
In 1976, Leonard W. Miller and Benny Scott were inducted into the Black Athletes Hall of Fame at the New York Hilton in Manhattan for their achievements in motor racing. A host of sports notables and entertainers were in attendance, including NFL star Frank Gifford, ABC Sports broadcaster Howard Cosell, legendary soul singer James Brown, boxing promoter Don King, and New York Knicks basketball player Earl "the Pearl" Monroe. Actor Bill Cosby was the master of ceremonies. Over 1000 patrons and icons attended the black-tie ceremony.

== Mini-Indy tragedy ==
African American driver Tommy Thompson approached Miller in 1977 to continue the BAR effort with personal funds in FSV (called Mini-Indy cars at that time). Miller’s longtime friend Ken Wright joined Ron Hines to perform mechanical duties on the Lola T-324 and T-620. BAR garnered some wins with Thompson, including the SCCA Northeast Division championship.

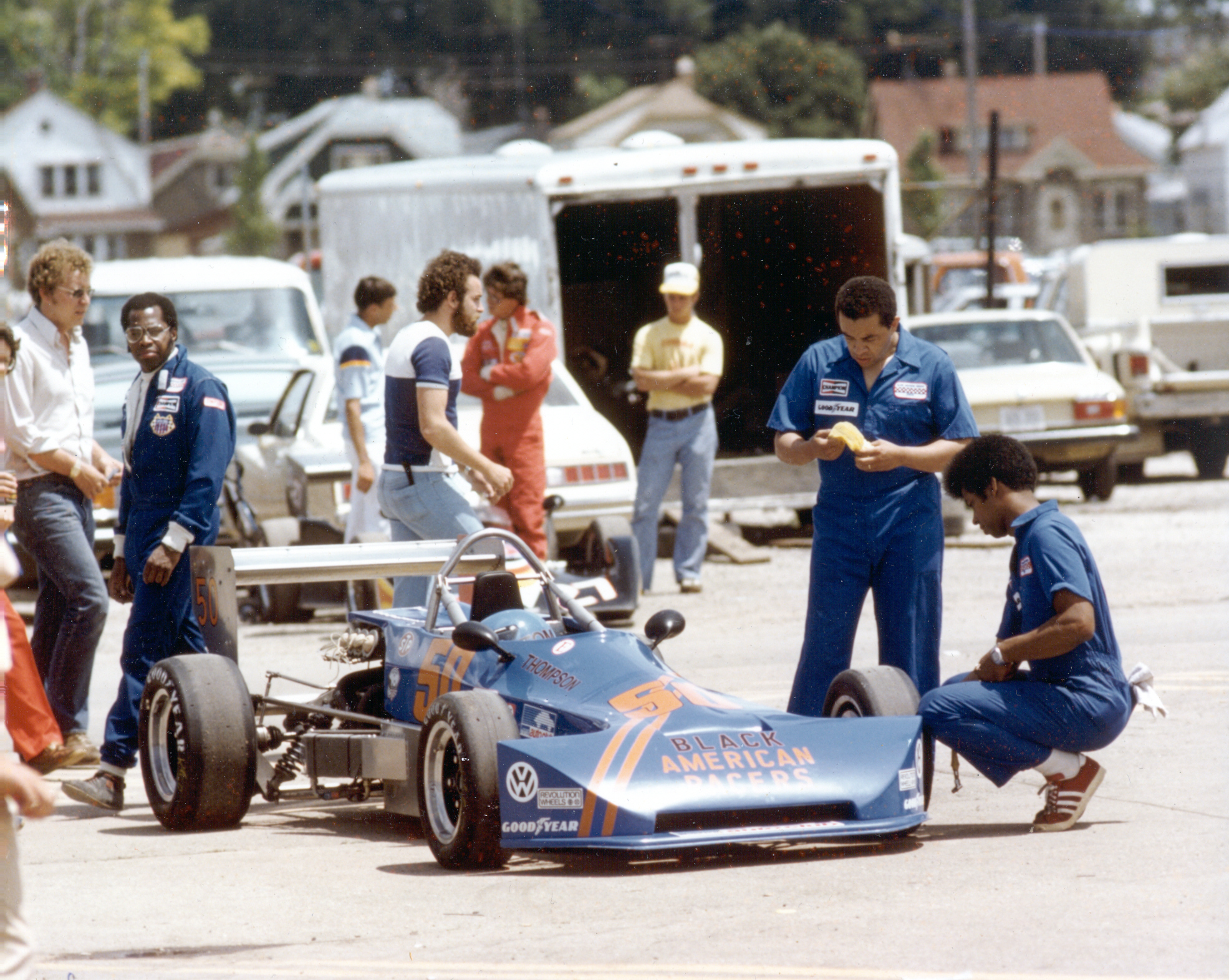
Tommy Thompson, Leonard W. Miller and Ron Hines at the Milwaukee Mile, September 1978

Unfortunately, in September 1978, Thompson was killed in a crash at the Trenton Speedway in Trenton, New Jersey. Benny Scott finished the 1978 season for BAR.

== Recent accomplishments ==
Miller formed several NASCAR grassroots efforts based from his shop in Concord, North Carolina from 1994 to 1999, resulting in many successes with his son, Leonard T. Miller. The team at this time was named Miller Racing Group and had General Motors and Dr Pepper as sponsors.

In 2005, Miller and his son were the first African American team owners to win a track championship in NASCAR history. They won the stock car championship at Old Dominion Speedway in Manassas, Virginia and was acknowledged as one of the top 10 teams in the middle Atlantic division. Franklin Butler was the driver.

Paul Newman called Miller's autobiography, Silent Thunder: Breaking Through Cultural, Racial, and Class Barriers in Motorsports (2004), "an extraordinary book that is refreshingly honest," and Mario Andretti praised it as "eye-opening". In its 50th Anniversary Edition in July 2008, AutoWeek magazine named Silent Thunder one of the top 50 automobile books of the previous 50 years.

Miller's son has also written a book about the Miller Racing Group and NASCAR, titled Racing While Black, published in 2010 by Seven Stories Press.
