= Leonard T. Miller =

American businessman

Pilot and auto racing team owner Leonard T. Miller

Leonard T. Miller, a native of Lawrenceville, New Jersey, graduated from Morehouse College in 1983 with a B.A. in business administration. He has achieved many accomplishments in aviation and motor racing and as an author.

== Life ==
Upon graduating from Morehouse, Miller earned his private pilot's license at DeKalb-Peachtree Airport in Atlanta, training in a Cessna 152. He had conceived a passion for flying at age 14. His first flight instructor was a former member of the Tuskegee Airmen.

Miller took a job as a salesman with Frito Lay in Philadelphia in order to finance the required flight ratings he needed to earn to qualify as a commercial pilot at Mercer County Airport in Trenton, New Jersey. To accumulate flight hours, he piloted a single-engine plane while broadcasting live traffic reports over the Trenton-Princeton corridor from a single-engine Beechcraft for radio station WHWH in Princeton, New Jersey. He later was hired by Flight Group, Inc. in Pottstown, Pennsylvania to fly cargo at night across the eastern United States in a twin-engine Cessna 310-R.

In 1987 and 1988, Miller was a pilot for Alleghany Airlines and Business Express, flying a Shorts 360 to and from regional and national airports in the northeastern United States. He was hired by United Airlines in 1989 as a DC-10 flight engineer. Later, as a pilot, he has flown the Boeing 737, 757, 767, and 777 throughout North America, Central America, South America, the Caribbean, Europe, the Middle East, and Asia.

In parallel with his flying, Leonard T. Miller is president of Miller Racing Group, Inc. (MRG), a second-generation auto racing team. His father, Leonard W. Miller, was the first black to enter a team in the Indianapolis 500, with Vanguard Racing in 1972. Beginning in the mid-1990s, MRG has primarily fielded black drivers in NASCAR, ARCA, and Formula BMW Americas. The following companies sponsored the team during this period: General Motors, Dr Pepper, the wristwatch brand Wittenauer, Sunoco, and Lincoln Electric. Miller's team delivered Dr Pepper's first corporate win on July 7, 2001, at the Coastal Plains Speedway in Jacksonville, North Carolina. In 2003, he received the Quartermasters “Trailblazer Award” from the Quartermasters Drag Racing Team in Clinton, Maryland for his continuous development of African American race car drivers in motorsports.

Miller and his father were the first African American team owners to win a track championship in the history of NASCAR. This was during the 2005 season in the NASCAR Weekly Racing Series. Franklin Butler was their driver, piloting the Millers' Chevrolet late model stock at Old Dominion Speedway in Manassas, Virginia.

In 2006, Miller recruited a champion go-kart driver, Joel Jackson, from Kingston, Jamaica to compete in Formula BMW Americas on road racing circuits in the U.S. and Canada.

== Writing ==
Miller adapted his father's autobiography, Silent Thunder, into a screenplay. In 2007, the screenplay was the 5th place finalist out of 1700 entries from 14 countries in the American Screenwriters Association's International contest.

In September 2001, Miller penned the vignette "Stranded: A Pilot’s Story" in the book 09/11, 8:48am: Documenting America’s Greatest Tragedy, published by Book Surge. The book was featured in London, England at a post-9/11 stage play adaptation where he and editor Ethan Casey were in attendance.

Racing While Black: How An African-American Stock Car Team Made Its Mark On NASCAR
- Author: Leonard T. Miller
- Language: English
- Subject: African American pioneers, motorsports
- Publisher: Seven Stories Press
- Publication date: 2010
- Publication place: United States
- Media type: Print (Hardcover)
- Pages: 320
- ISBN: 1-58322-896-9
- OCLC: 52471386

Miller has also co-authored his auto racing autobiography Racing While Black: How An African-American Stock Car Team Made Its Mark On NASCAR with ESPN: The Magazine senior editor Andrew Simon, published by Seven Stories Press, New York in February 2010.

AutoWeek magazine listed Racing While Black as one of the top twelve books to read in 2010 in its January 11, 2010 issue.

Miller and Miller Racing Group, Inc. have been covered in The New York Times, AutoWeek, Circle Track & Racing Technology, The Hollywood Reporter, African Americans On Wheels, USA Today, Reuters news service, and other publications.
