= Black American Racers Association =

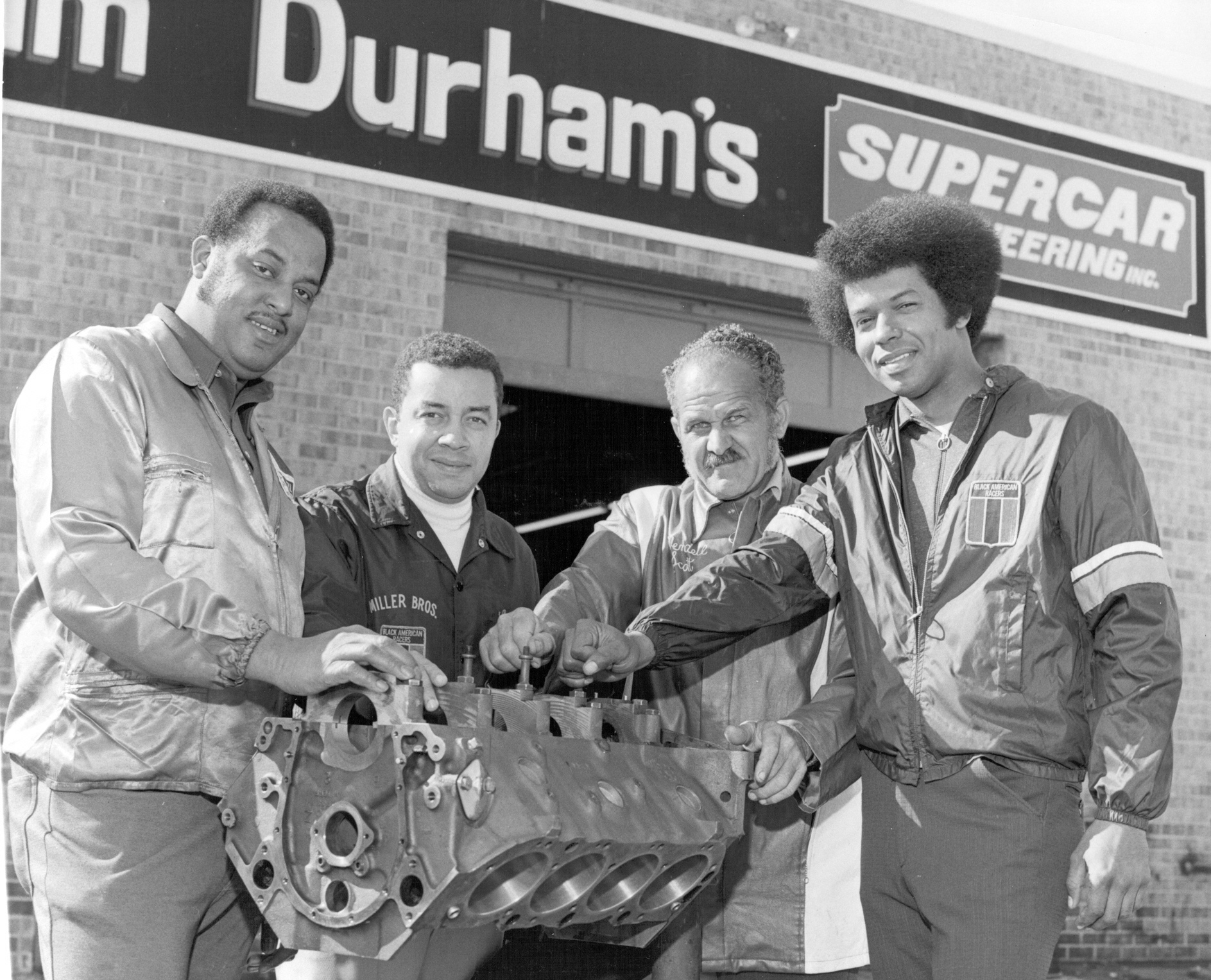
Malcolm Durham, Leonard W. Miller, Wendell Scott, and Ronald Hines (l-r) of the Black American Racers Association

The Black American Racers Association (BARA) was founded in August 1972 in Trenton, New Jersey by Leonard W. Miller, Ron Hines, Eugene Gadson, and Charles Singleton. BARA was formed to give recognition to black racing drivers, crews, mechanics, car owners, and other members of the auto racing community and corporations that help promote black racing development. BARA ceased operations in 1978.

== Objectives ==
BARA's short-term goals were to publicize to the American public the all but forgotten achievements of blacks in racing, to interest minority youth in racing-oriented careers, and to increase black spectator interest in motor sports.

Long-term goals included educating BARA's membership in building successful racing teams, reducing sponsorship inequities facing black racers and teams, and supporting the continuation and growth of racing in general.

== Membership and programs ==
In 1974, BARA's regular membership cost $10, and a lifetime membership was $100. Both levels received decals, patches, and newsletters. The most distinctive benefit of BARA membership was a membership card honored for discounts by speed shops and auto stores throughout the United States. Those noted in the association's yearbook included Hollywood Sam's in Detroit and Trio Auto Supply in Trenton, New Jersey.

== Conventions, award recipients and sponsors ==
In BARA's five years in existence, its membership grew to nearly 5000 persons, including several car clubs. Each year BARA sponsored a dinner dance honoring black racing's most accomplished individuals. Sumner "Red" Oliver, a black racing pioneer from Indianapolis, was honored at BARA's first convention in Trenton, New Jersey in 1974, for his success as a driver from the 1920s through the 1950s and as a mechanic on the United States Auto Club (USAC) championship circuit. In the 1970s, Oliver was a crew member on the Patrick Petroleum-Wally Dallenbach Indy car team. Corporate recognition at the 1974 convention included the BARA-Schaefer Brewing Company Award to Stock Car Racing magazine for its coverage of blacks in racing in 1973, and to Champion Spark Plug Company for its support of black racing development.

BARA's 1975 convention in Arlington, Virginia honored Wendell Scott, the well-known, longtime NASCAR competitor from Danville, Virginia and BARA's first vice-president. Scott was the only black to win a NASCAR race, in Jacksonville, Florida, in 1961. The 1975 BARA–Schaefer Brewing Company awards were presented to the Brown & Williamson Tobacco Company for its historic pioneering sponsorship of Black American Racers Inc., a Formula Super Vee Gold Cup and Formula 5000 road racing team with driver Benny Scott, and to Wendell Scott for his pioneering efforts in NASCAR. (The Ford Motor Company refused to recognize Scott's accomplishments at the awards banquet.)

At BARA's 1976 convention BARA's first president, Malcolm Durham, was honored for his historic accomplishments in drag racing. Durham won many times on the National Hot Rod Association (NHRA) circuit and was well known on the associated match racing circuit with his "Strip Blazer" Pro Stock drag cars. He was the successful owner-operator of Supercar Engineering, a racing car shop in Hyattsville, Maryland, until his death in 2006. His sponsors included Pennzoil, Cragar Industries, A&A Fiberglass, Inc., Accel Ignitions, Edelbrock Corporation, Champion Spark Plug Company, Goodyear Tire & Rubber Company, Hurst Performance, the motor oil company STP, and Fram filters.

At the 1977 convention, BARA honored Tommy Thompson of Somerset, New Jersey, for his accomplishments as the driver and chief mechanic for the Black American Racers, Inc. (BAR) Formula Super Vee road racer. Thompson won the Northeast Sports Car Club of America (SCCA) Formula Super Vee Championship in 1977 - the first black to accomplish such a feat. At this convention - prior to his first professional fight - BARA awarded Sugar Ray Leonard a lifetime membership for inspiring youth in the Baltimore area and around the country to achieve in sports. Tommy Thompson, who later died in a crash at a 1978 race in Trenton, was recognized with awards from STP, Trio Auto Supply of Trenton, and Detroit-based General Kinetics Cams.

== Publications ==
BARA published a Black Racers Yearbook in 1974. It was an official annual publication of BARA and sold for one dollar. The publication had 32 pages and consisted of articles covering topics such as how to obtain sponsorship and challenges for black racers. It was the only yearbook the association published. This now rare publication covered black racing history from the 1930s to the early 1970s. Seven major corporations placed ads in the yearbook, and it sold thousands of copies in the United States.

BARA also published a monthly newsletter, which highlighted accomplishments by blacks in all phases of auto racing around the United States.

== Association race event ==
On March 10, 1974, at Madison Township Raceway Park in Englishtown, New Jersey, BARA sponsored Englishtown's 1974 opening program, a Pro Stock Race featuring the United Soul Racing Team. This race included many of drag racing's African American stars of the time, including Rufus "Brooklyn Heavy" Boyd, "Strip Blazer" Malcolm Durham, Bill "Tuff Rabbit" White, "Wicked" Will Smallwood, Sam Carroll, and Joe Fisher, driving Ronald Lyle's Hemi Colt. Herb McCandless drove Brooklyn Heavy's second car. More than 25,000 spectators were in attendance for this event.

== Legacy ==
BARA's first chairman, Leonard W. Miller, remains one of America's most knowledgeable authorities on the history of blacks in motor racing. He has been owner and president of various winning teams in drag racing, road racing, dirt track racing, and oval track racing. He is the author of Silent Thunder: Breaking Through Cultural, Racial, and Class Barriers in Motorsports (2004), a chronicle of his life in auto racing.

Miller and Ron Hines, who was BARA's first secretary, enter their classic cars and street rods at auto shows in the Northeast. They are both in contact with Eugene Gadson, who is a retired psychologist. Charles Singleton, a car collector, is assistant manager of a funeral home in New Jersey. Both Gadson and Singleton are dedicated NASCAR fans. They have attended NASCAR races since 1968, including the Daytona 500.
