= Hannah Tempest Jenkins =

American painter

- Born: Hannah Tempest; March 7, 1854; Philadelphia, Pennsylvania
- Died: September 27, 1927 (aged 73); Claremont, California
- Known for: Painting
- Spouse: John H. Jenkins (m. 1872, died)

Hannah Tempest Jenkins (1855–1927) was an American painter and educator. She taught at Pomona College and founded The Rembrandt Club of Pomona College and Claremont, an art appreciation society that still exists.

== Biography ==
Jenkins (née Tempest) was born on March 7, 1854, in Philadelphia. She married John H. Jenkins in 1872. After his early death she began her art career. She studied in Philadelphia at the Spring Garden Institute, the School of Industrial Art, and the Pennsylvania Academy of the Fine Arts. She also studied at the Académie Julian in Paris, and with Takeuchi Seihō in Kyoto. Her teachers in included William Merritt Chase, Jean-Joseph Benjamin-Constant, Tony Robert-Fleury Cecilia Beaux, and Robert Vonnoh.

Jenkins exhibited at the Paris Salon, the National Academy of Design, and the Pennsylvania Academy of the Fine Arts. She also exhibited her work at the Palace of Fine Arts at the 1893 World's Columbian Exposition in Chicago, Illinois as well as the Alaska–Yukon–Pacific Exposition in 1909 in Seattle, Washington.

She taught art and art history at Pomona College in Claremont, California, from 1905 to 1926. She helped establish the Art Department at Pomona and in 1905 she founded The Rembrandt Club of Pomona College and Claremont to encourage the study of art at the college.

Jenkins died on September 27, 1927, in Claremont.

== Legacy ==
Jenkins left her art collection to Claremont College. In 2008 Jenkins' work was included in the exhibition First Generation: Art in Claremont, 1907-1957 at the Claremont Museum of Art.

== Gallery ==
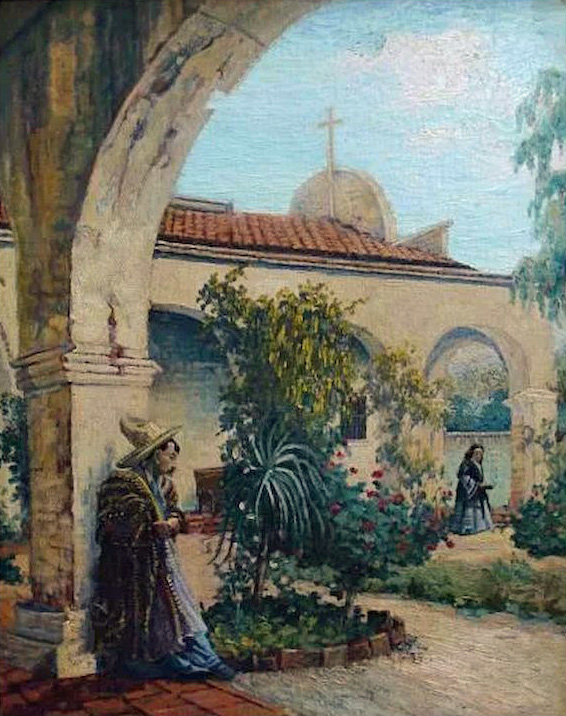
A Meeting at the Mission San Juan Capistrano

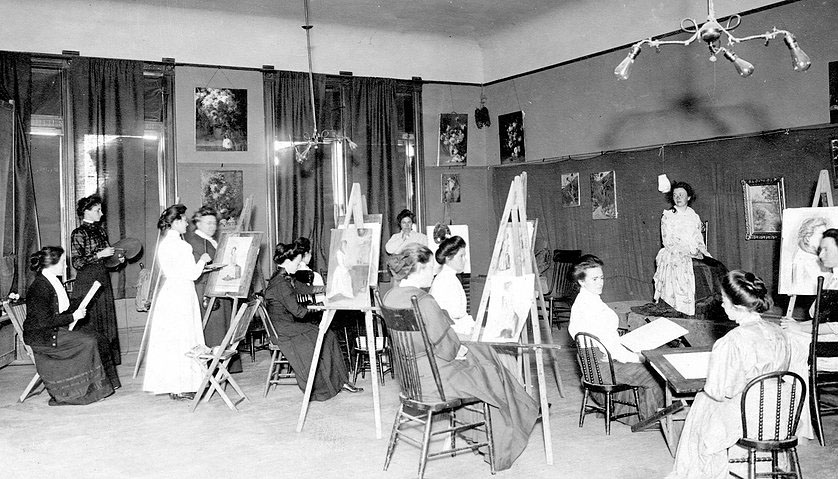
Jenkins' art class, Holmes Hall, c. 1905

== See also ==
- Benton Museum of Art at Pomona College
