= William South (photographer) =

American photographer and inventor (1866–1938)

William C. South
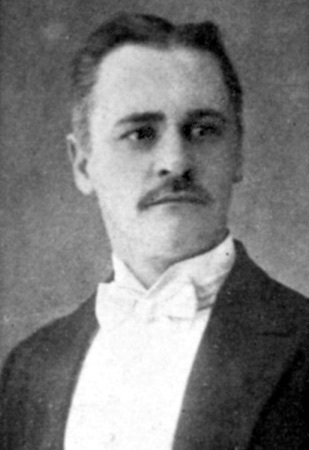
- Picture of South ca. 1910
- Born: October 29, 1866; Berwyn, Pennsylvania, U.S.
- Died: April 24, 1938 (aged 71)
- Resting place: Laurel Hill Cemetery, Philadelphia, Pennsylvania, U.S.
- Education: Spring Garden Institute
- Occupations: Photographer, inventor

William C. South (October 29, 1866 – April 24, 1938) was an American photographer and inventor who patented the Solgram, a tri-color system of color photography, in 1904. This system utilized a unique camera to capture three separate color negatives simultaneously. The negatives were then overlaid to produce full-color photographs on paper treated with three different colored pigments. It was widely exhibited and won several awards, but was not a financial success.

== Early life ==
South was born on October 29, 1866, in Berwyn, Pennsylvania to George W. and Mary Ella South. A biographical sketch from an advertisement, states that he received a degree in art and mechanical engineering from the Spring Garden Institute in Philadelphia. He desired to become a landscape painter, and implemented photography to help his painting studies.

== Career ==
In 1891, he worked at George W. Brown's photography gallery and became the owner of the establishment. He worked as a commercial photographer for the Erie Railroad and International Navigation Company steamship lines.

=== The Solgram ===
South experimented with color photography in his laboratory in Berwyn, Pennsylvania, and patented a color photographic process in 1904, similar to gum bichromate, which he called the "Solgram". South's work was largely based on subtractive color pioneered by Louis Arthur Ducos du Hauron.

With his partner, Hugh O'Donnell, he patented a unique camera, which took three color separation negatives simultaneously, each with a different colored filter (purple, orange and green).

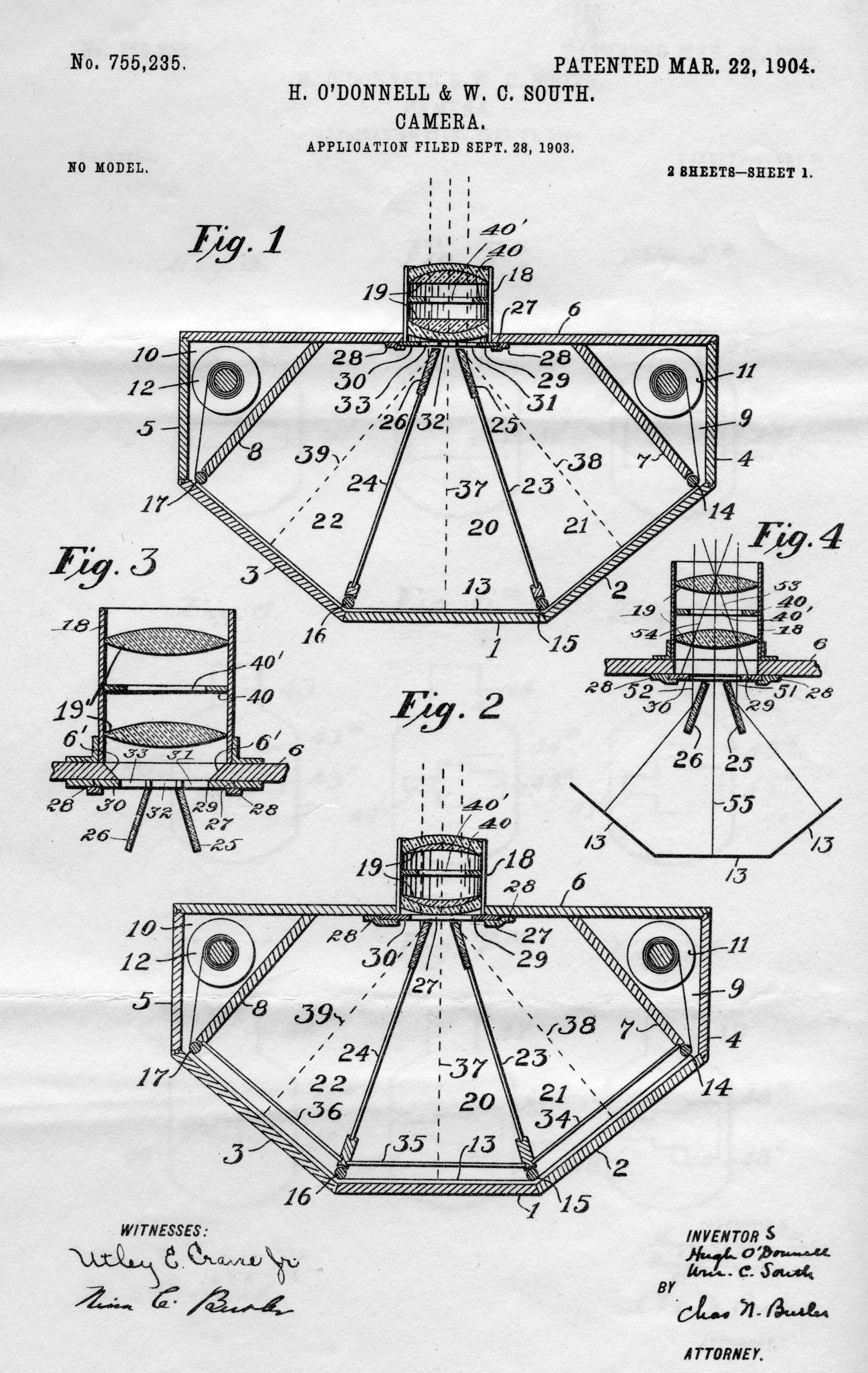
Solgram camera patent drawings

These negatives were used to make full-color photographs by treating prepared paper with three different pigments. Each color – red, blue and yellow – were printed one layer at a time, registering the image with the negative taken with the corresponding filter.

South received patents on the camera and Solgram process in the United States, Canada, Great Britain, France, and Belgium. On December 21, 1904, he founded the Solgram Color-Photo Company and began the production of printing kits in Downingtown, Pennsylvania. He promoted the process through demonstrations and exhibitions. The first demonstration of the Solgram was given on December 28, 1903, at a meeting of the Columbia Photographic Society in Philadelphia. He won a bronze medal for his color photographs at the Pennsylvania exhibit at the 1904 World's Fair in St. Louis.

He wrote in his pamphlet "'The Solgram' A System of Color Photography": "As there is no process of means of producing pictures, which for truthfulness of reproducing nature can rival a water-color drawing executed by a master, I have made the aquarelle my standard."

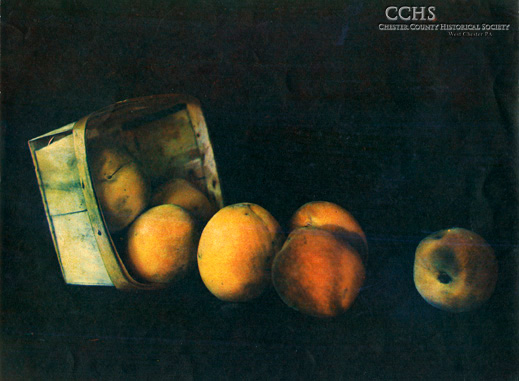
"Peaches", Solgram print

South received some interest in the process from the United States Department of Agriculture as well as contemporary artists like Charles E. Dana. However, the process had some drawbacks. It was time-consuming to produce and aligning the negatives exactly for the three printings was difficult. The Solgram Color Photo Co. went bankrupt in 1906.

In 1911 South filed a complaint against Eastman Kodak Company, charging that they were attempting to create a monopoly by limiting their dealers to Kodak products only. South sued Kodak for $100,000 for losses incurred by the Solgram Paper Company and for $200,000 for loss of profits from his patents. Kodak denied the charges. South's evidence was not convincing enough and judgment was not in his favor.

Undaunted, South opened the Keystone School of Photography in his building on St. Joseph's Alley in Downingtown in 1910. He offered a nine-month course for $150 which taught students how to operate their own photographic gallery. He also offered an advanced degree in artography, a term he coined for photography as a fine art. Naturally the Solgram color process was taught. He did not attract the 200 students he anticipated and closed the Keystone School of Photography down around 1912.

== Retirement, death, and legacy ==
South retired from photography to teach music and make violins. He was an accomplished musician and directed the Premier Concert and Dance Orchestra in Downingtown.

After his wife, Anna Boyle South died in 1935, he moved to the Turk's Head Inn in West Chester, Pennsylvania. South was well known in West Chester for his collection of rare violins, including a Stradivarius and a Guarneri. He died on April 24, 1938, at age 72 in a Berwyn nursing home and left no heirs. He was interred at Laurel Hill Cemetery in Philadelphia.

An archive of his patents, business papers and photographs are in the collection of the Chester County History Center. Some of his photographs were exhibited in 1989 at the Philadelphia Museum of Art as part of the Photography Sesquicentennial Project in an exhibition titled "Legacy in Light: Photographic Treasures from Philadelphia Area Public Collections" and were featured in the exhibit catalogue.

== Additional reading ==
- Powell, Pamela C. "Reflected Light: A Century of Photography in Chester County" 1988.
- Finkel, Kenneth. "Legacy in Light: Photographic Treasures from Philadelphia Area Public Collections", Philadelphia: Photography Sesquicentennial Project, 1990.
- Coe, Brian. "Colour Photography: The First Hundred Years, 1840-1940" London: Ash & Grant, 1978
