= George Hand Wright =

American painter, illustrator and printmaker

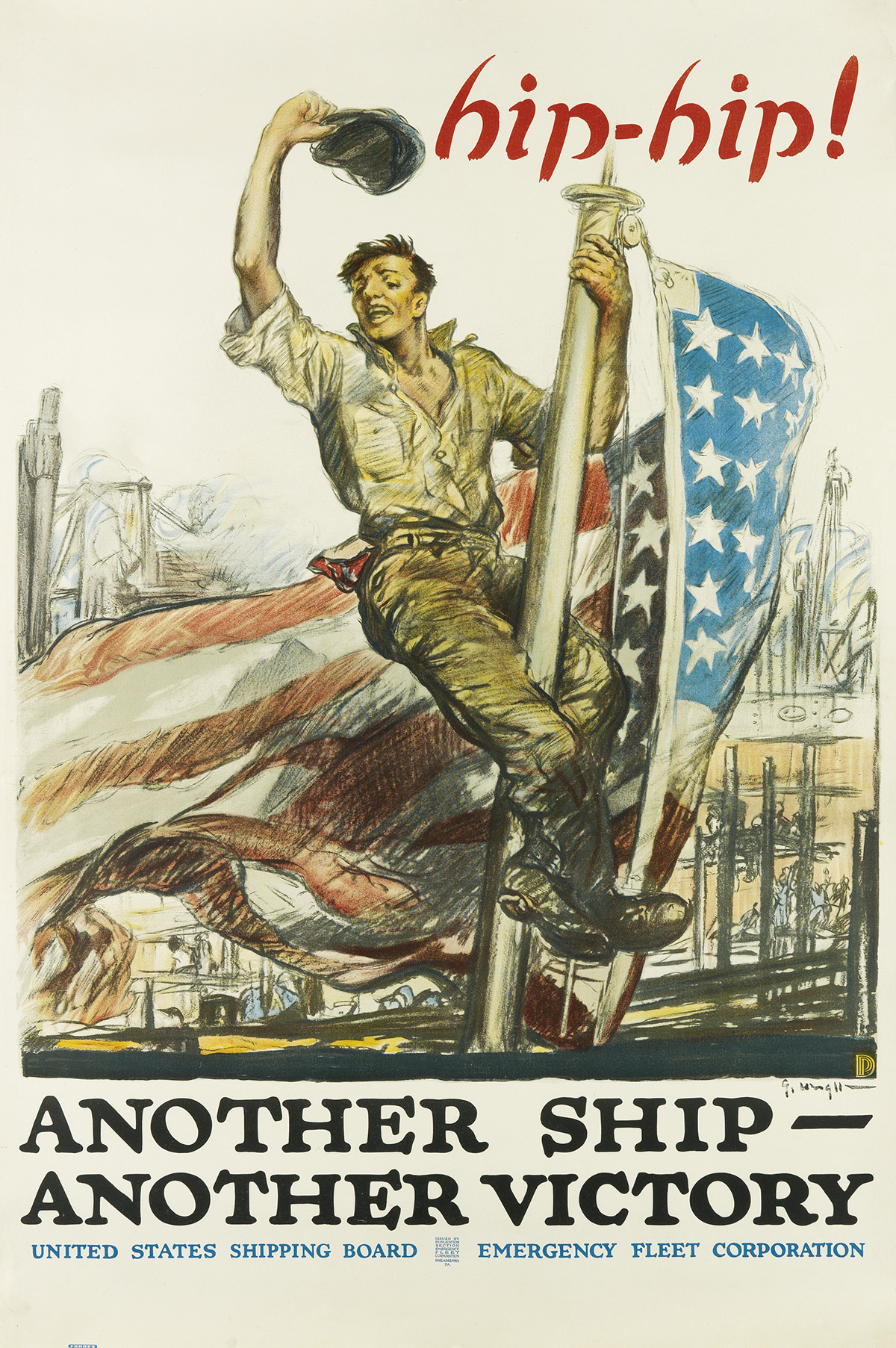
- 1918 World War I poster by Wright
- Born: 1872; Fox Chase, Philadelphia, Pennsylvania
- Died: 1951 (aged 78–79); Westport, Connecticut
- Education: Spring Garden College
- Alma mater: Pennsylvania Academy of the Fine Arts, Robert Vonnoh
- Spouse: Anne Boylan
- Awards: National Academy of Design

George Hand Wright (1872–1951) was an American painter, illustrator and printmaker.

== Life ==
Born in the Fox Chase section of Philadelphia, Pennsylvania, the son of a blacksmith, he attended the Spring Garden Institute, a local technical school, and was apprenticed to a lithographer. He studied at the Pennsylvania Academy of the Fine Arts under Robert Vonnoh, where his classmates included Robert Henri, John Sloan and William Glackens.

He moved to New York City, and his first illustration appeared in Scribner's Magazine in 1893. He illustrated a number of books, and his work soon appeared regularly in magazines such as Scribner's, Harper's, Collier's, The Saturday Evening Post, and others.

He married Anne Boylan, and in 1907 they settled in Westport, Connecticut. He became one of the founders of its artistic community. In mid-career, he turned from commercial illustration to watercolors, pastels and etchings.

He exhibited at the Pennsylvania Academy of the Fine Arts, the Brooklyn Society of Etchers, the Society of American Etchers, and a number of New York galleries. He was a member of the Society of American Etchers, the Society of Illustrators, the Salmagundi Club and the Westport Artists. In 1939, he was elected to the National Academy of Design.

Wright died in Westport in 1951.

The Library of Congress has a collection of more than one hundred of his illustrations. A biography, George Hand Wright: An Artist's Life Examined by Kirsten M. Jensen, was published in 2008.

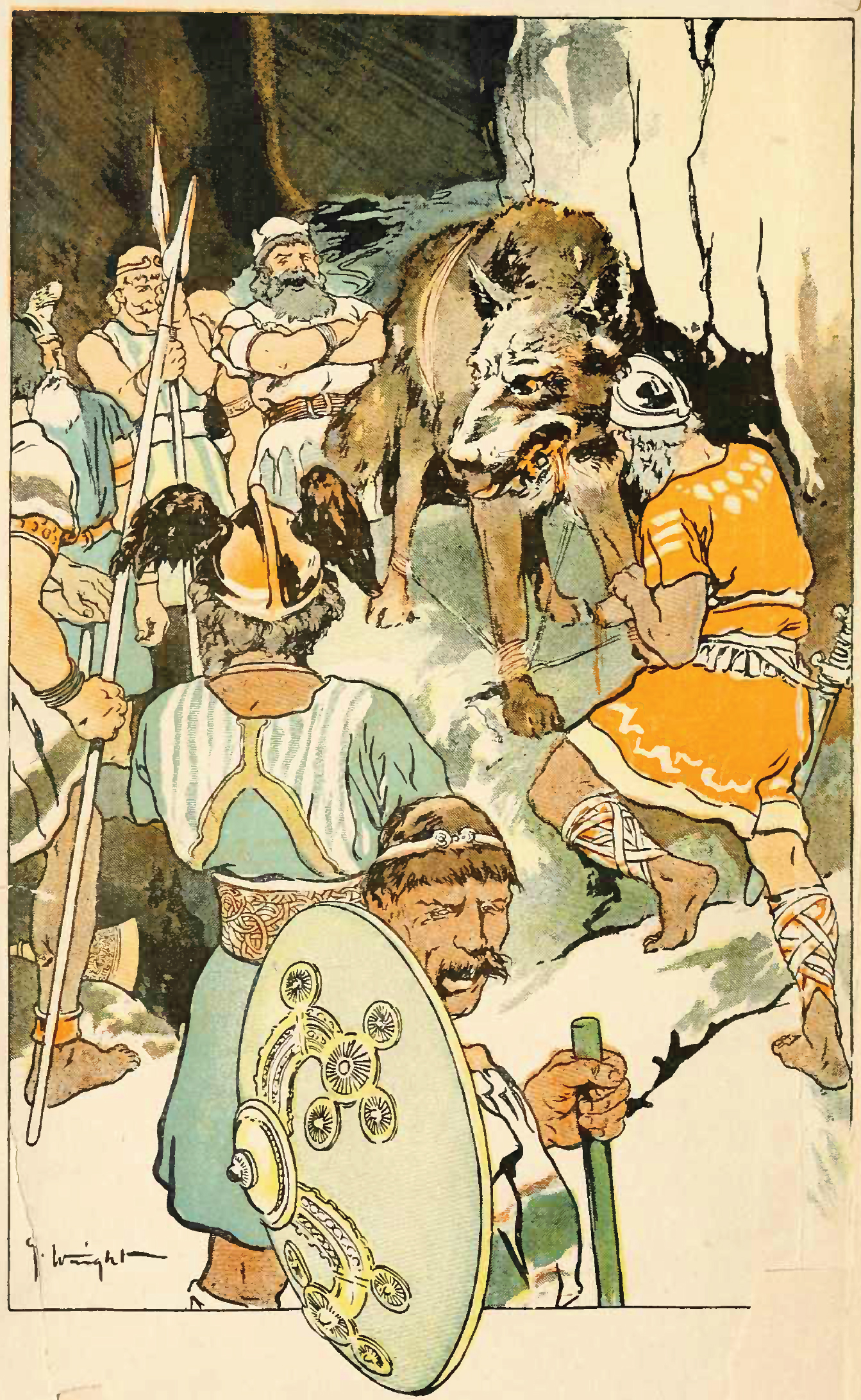
"The binding of Fenrir," illustration from Hamilton Wright Mabie, Norse Stories Retold from the Eddas (1908).

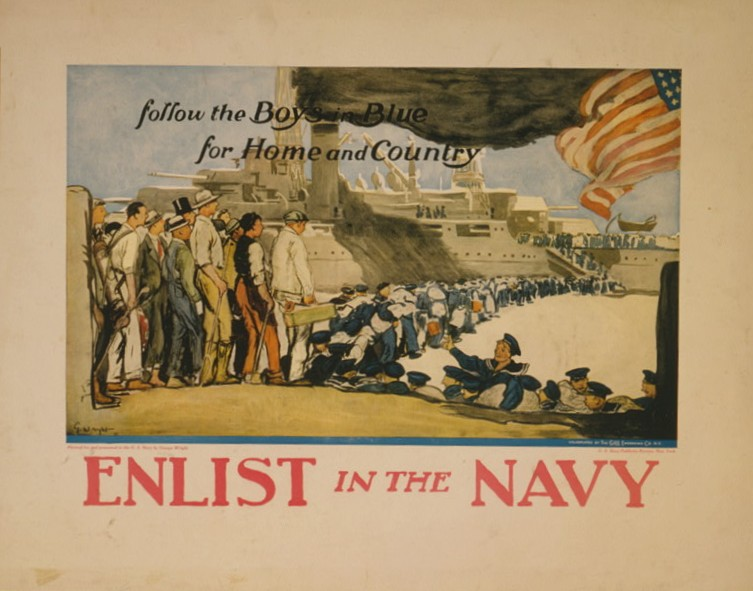
U.S. Navy recruiting poster, circa 1914-18.

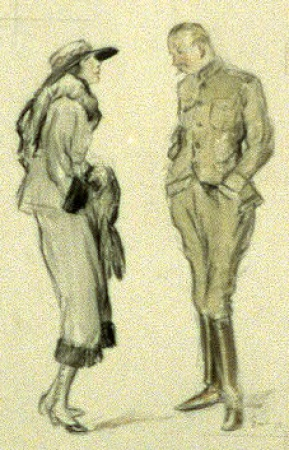
"A Slicker", illustration from Harper's Magazine, March 1918.

== Other artists named George Wright ==
Works by similarly-named artists are often misattributed to George Hand Wright:

- George Frederick Wright (1828-1881), American portrait painter. A large collection of his work is at the Connecticut Historical Society.
- George W. Wright (1834-1934), American painter of Victorian genre scenes. Examples of his work are at the Hudson River Museum.
- George Wright (1860-1942), British equestrian painter.

== Sources ==
- Kirsten M. Jensen, George Hand Wright: An Artist's Life Examined, PEN Press, 2007, ISBN 9781605303451
