= Laredo (cigarette) =

Cigarette-making kit

Laredo was a tobacco kit introduced by Brown & Williamson in the early 1970s. It was sold with the slogan, "If you want something done right, do it yourself." The kit consisted of a tobacco tin, a plastic cigarette-making device, and loose cigarette papers and filters. A filter and Laredo brand tobacco were inserted into the device, and a lever was pulled to compress the tobacco. Another lever slid the plug of tobacco and the filter into an empty cigarette paper tube to form a homemade cigarette.

Although the gimmick was hailed as innovative for its time, the tobacco itself was criticized for being bland, and the devices tended to jam. According to one smoker, "Invariably, the tobacco wouldn't distribute consistently, so every cigarette was different — always bad. Some were so tightly stuffed that there was no way to draw. Some were so loose that they tended to go up in flame (or the tobacco just fell out)." The product was eventually discontinued.
