= Spring Garden College =

Private college in Philadelphia, Pennsylvania, United States

Coordinates: 39.9626°N 75.1611°W

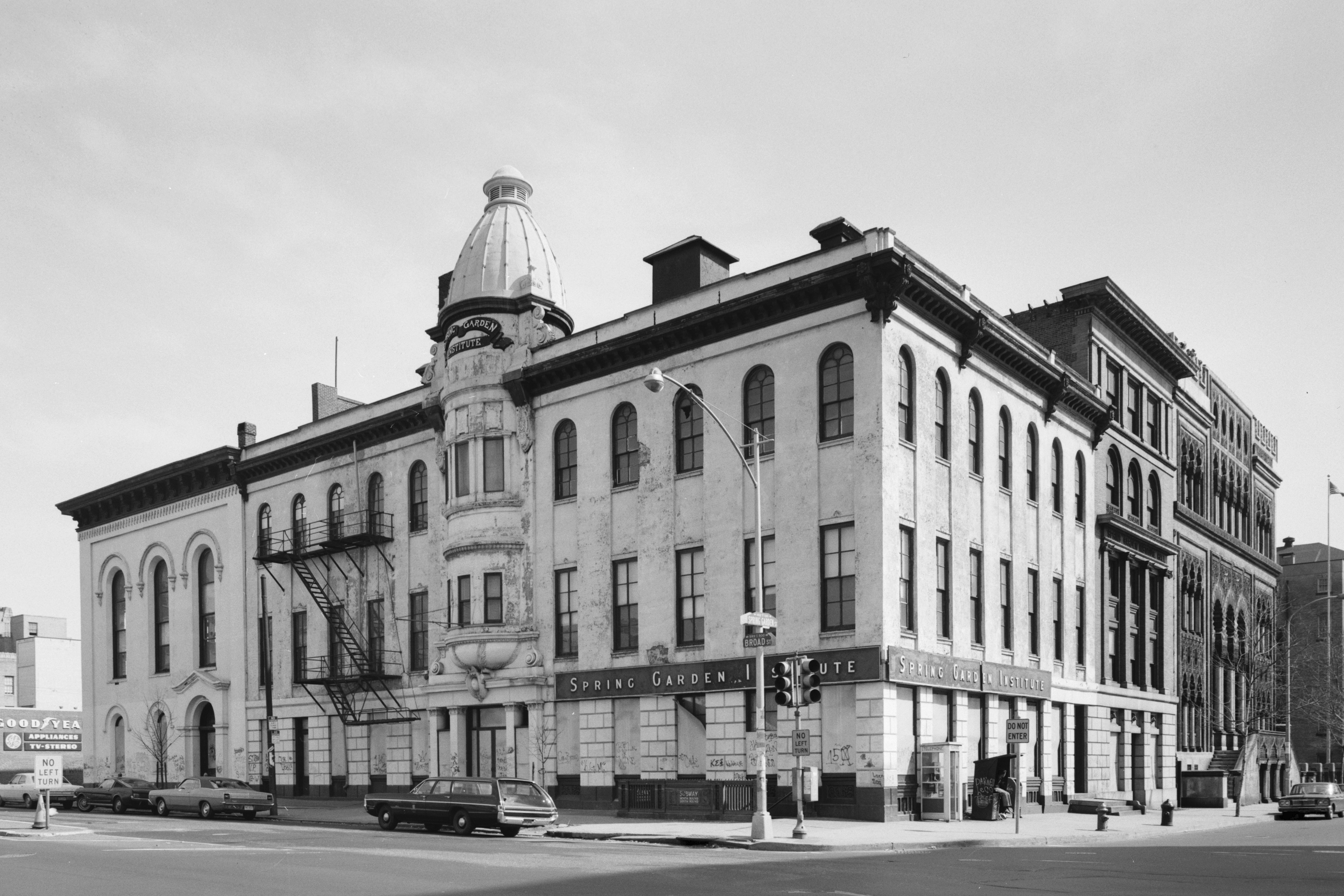
This building, at the northeast corner of Broad and Spring Garden Streets, housed the institute from about 1851 to 1969, and was torn down in 1972.

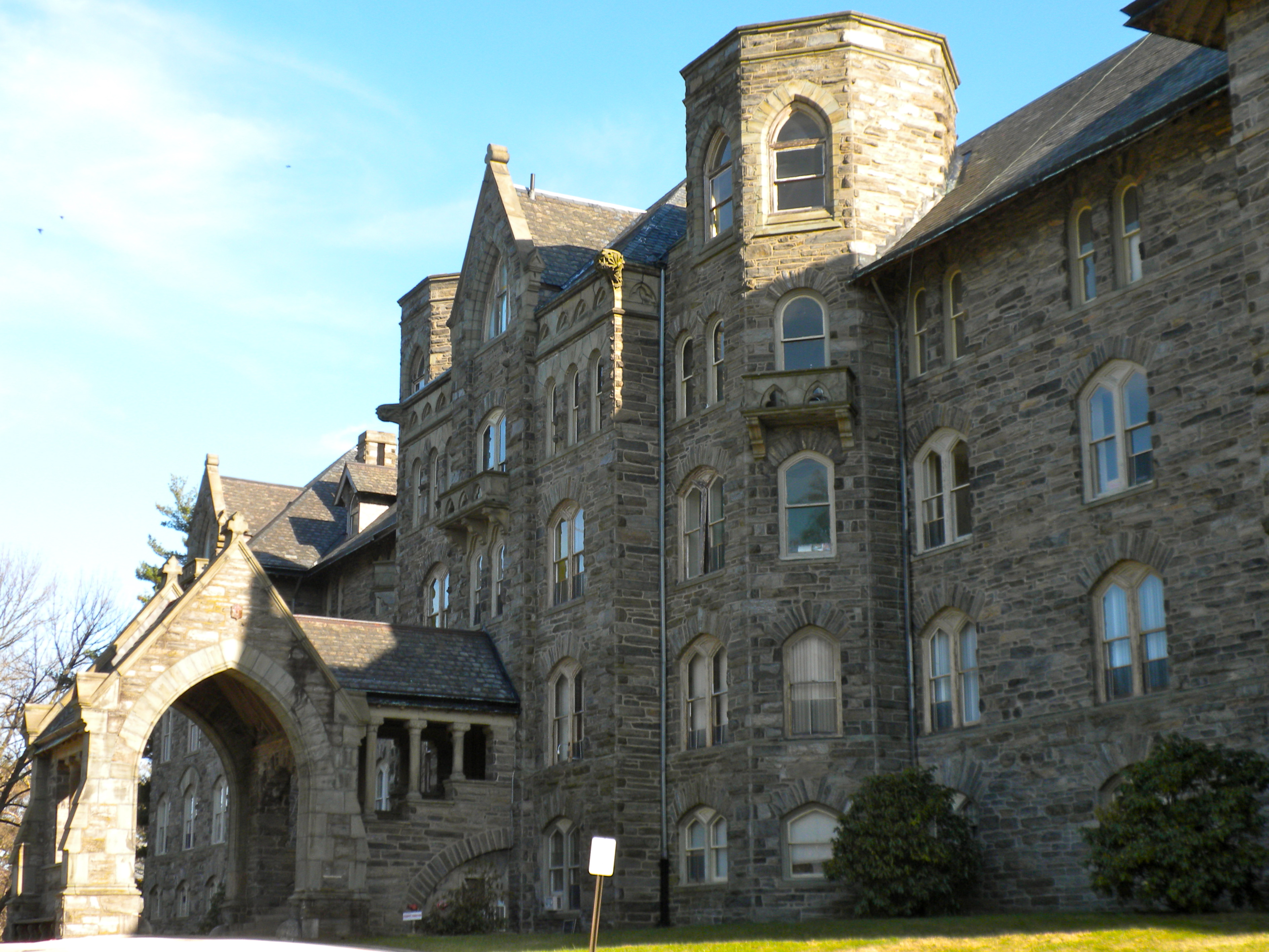
Trustee's Hall in Mt. Airy was part of the college's campus from 1985 to 1992.

Spring Garden College—founded in 1851 as the Spring Garden Institute—was an American private technical college in the Spring Garden section of Philadelphia, Pennsylvania. Its building at 523–25 North Broad Street (demolished) was designed by architect Stephen Decatur Button.

The Broad Street building housed the institute until 1969. The school relocated to 102 East Mermaid Lane at the former Yarnall-Waring Company Machine Works and was renamed Spring Garden College, with bachelor's degree programs being offered for the first time. In 1985 the college moved to 7500 Germantown Avenue in nearby Mt. Airy. Declining enrollment and financial problems forced its closure in 1992.

Prior to its closing, Spring Garden was regionally accredited by the Commission on Higher Education of the Middle States Association of Colleges and Schools. Additionally, the Baccalaureate Degree programs in Computer Engineering Technology, Electronics engineering technology, and Mechanical Engineering Technology were accredited by the Technology Accreditation Commission of the Accreditation Board for Engineering and Technology (ABET).

== Notable alumni ==
- Harrison Albright, architect
- Charles Grafly, sculptor
- Hannah Tempest Jenkins, painter
- Eldridge R. Johnson, inventor, founder of Victor Talking Machine Company
- John B. Kelly Sr., building contractor (father of actress Grace Kelly)
- Albert Laessle, sculptor
- Samuel Maclure, architect
- Everett Shinn, painter
- John Sloan, painter
- William South, photographer & inventor
- George Hand Wright, painter
- Ken Wright, racecar driver and mechanic
- August Zeller, sculptor
