= Benny Scott =

American racing driver (1945– 2009)

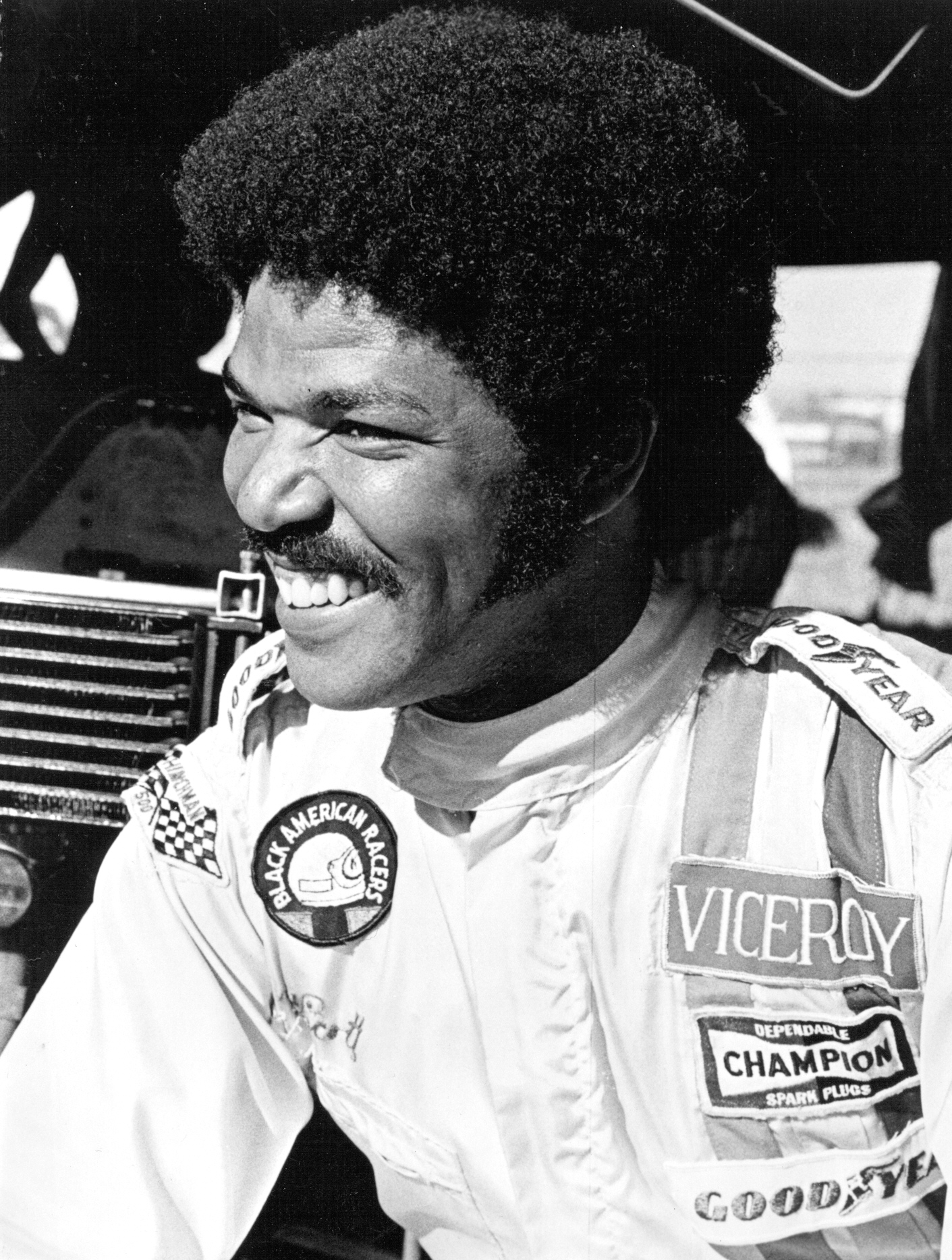
African American auto racing pioneer Benny Scott

Benny Scott (February 4, 1945 in Los Angeles, California – September 25, 2009), was a second-generation African American race car driver, a rarity in the motor racing industry. Scott's father, Bill "Bullet" Scott, inspired his son racing midgets in Southern California in the 1930s.

== Early career ==
In 1968, Scott quickly recognized the enormous sums of money it took to race cars, so he earned his master's degree in psychology. He taught psychology at Los Angeles Harbor College while competing in foreign stock car events in Southern California at the height of the Vietnam War, driving a Renault 4CV. He finished the season ranked 10th in points. In 1969, he returned with an advanced tubular chassis Renault with a Gordini engine and won the Foreign Stock Car Association of Southern California title, his first championship. Shortly thereafter he transitioned into road racing, driving an Austin-Healey Bug-Eyed Sprite in the H-Production class and Formula B cars at Riverside International Raceway in Riverside, California, earning his Sports Car Club of America (SCCA) license.

Mel Leighton, a Los Angeles-based African American racing pioneer whose career had begun before the Second World War, introduced Scott to Leonard W. Miller, an African American businessman and president of Dynamic Programs, Inc., a manpower consulting firm in Trenton, New Jersey.

== Joining a team ==
In 1971, Miller organized Vanguard Racing, Inc. to field Benny Scott in Formula A, to prepare him over five years for the Indianapolis 500. Vanguard's board of directors included Paul Jackson, president of Jackson & Sanders Construction Company, Sargent Shriver, first head of the Peace Corps and former Ambassador to France, who was the Democratic candidate for vice president in the 1972 presidential election, Washington Redskins defensive halfback Brig Owens, and Richard Deutsch, chairman of the board of Harbor Oil Corporation.

Scott drove the Vanguard Formula A in a McLaren M10-A, powered with a 500-horsepower Chevrolet V-8 in the L & M Continental 5000 Championship and SCCA events. Drivers came from as far away as Melbourne, Australia to compete in Formula A. Scott won the CSCC-SCCA Southern Pacific Division Championship in 1972 with the McLaren M10-A.

Scott was featured in Champion Spark Plug's first national print advertising featuring an African American driver, in a campaign that ran in several national magazines tilted "Fast Road to Indianapolis." The ad showed Scott standing beside a Vanguard McLaren M10-A. Champion became a secondary sponsor for Black American Racers, Inc. and a charter member of the Black American Racers Association (BARA).

BARA was created in 1972 by Leonard W. Miller, Ron Hines, Wendell Scott, and Malcolm Durham. This organization blossomed into a nationwide membership of 5000, supporting all African American efforts in various categories of auto racing competition. BARA also served as a support network for Benny Scott's extraordinary motor racing ambition in the aftermath of the Civil Rights Movement.

In addition to Benny Scott, Vanguard Racing, Inc. fielded a white driver, John Mahler, in the 1972 Indianapolis 500. Vanguard's concept was to use Mahler as a development coach and a conduit for Scott's preparation for the Indianapolis 500 in subsequent years. However, many of Vanguard's stockholders were so exuberant over the Indianapolis experience with John Mahler that they lost their patience to develop Benny Scott. As a result, they disbanded.

== National sponsorship ==
In 1973, Leonard W. Miller formed Black American Racers, Inc. (BAR) from his offices located at 130 West State Street in Trenton, New Jersey. BAR secured sponsorship from Brown & Williamson Tobacco Company (Viceroy Cigarettes). The sponsorship included an internal plan dubbed "Road to Indy." This progression strategy put Scott in Formula Super Vee (FSV) competition in SCCA, International Motor Sports Association (IMSA), and the Robert Bosch Gold Cup series on road courses throughout America including Watkins Glen, Lime Rock, Road Atlanta, Laguna Seca, and Road America.

Scott achieved several podium finishes in Lola T-324 FSVs purchased from Carl Haas. His most memorable event was at Laguna Seca Raceway in Monterey, California on May 4, 1975, where he achieved pole position at 100.882 mph. He was the first driver ever to top 100 mph in a Formula Super Vee at Laguna Seca. In addition, he was the fastest driver during the entire weekend and bested his qualifying speed in the race at 101.111 mph. He was even faster than Germany's legendary Hans-Joachim Stuck, who drove a BMW 3.0 CSL in another series. On the last lap of the race, approaching the finish line, Scott was beaten by inches by Freddie Phillips in his Eldon Mk 14B. Other drivers who emerged from FSV included Howdy Holmes, Bob Lazier, and Bill Alsup. All three qualified for the Indianapolis 500 in the late 1970s and early 1980s.

== Inaugural Long Beach Grand Prix ==
Brown & Williamson Tobacco was more than pleased with Scott's development. The company advanced BAR into Formula 5000 racing, competing at the same circuits with legends such as Al Unser, Mario Andretti, David Hobbs, Brian Redman, Jackie Oliver, and Jody Scheckter.

Scott's most notable race in Formula 5000 was the inaugural Long Beach Grand Prix on September 28, 1975, where he qualified the BAR Lola T332 24th on the grid of the 30 drivers that qualified for the race out of 60 entrants from five countries. Viceroy sponsored Unser and Andretti under Vel's Parnelli Jones as well. Benny finished 11th in the grand prix, his third race in the 210-mph Lola T332. The Viceroy Parnelli cars expired, due to mechanical failures.

At the end of the 1975 season, Brown & Williamson Tobacco Company withdrew their entire auto racing sponsorships around the globe as a result of internal union pressures to curtail promotional dollars. (BAR was unable to replicate the sponsorship.)

== Hall of Fame ==
In 1976, Benny Scott was inducted into the Black Athletes Hall of Fame at the New York Hilton. Actor Bill Cosby was the master of ceremonies. A legion of athletes and sports icons were inducted, including football great Frank Gifford, ABC-TV commentator Howard Cosell, boxing promoter, Don King, NBA player Earl "The Pearl" Monroe of the New York Knickerbockers, and boxer Joe Frazier. The black-tie event was attended by more than 1000 spectators and VIPs.

In 1978, Benny Scott returned to Formula Super Vee racing and finished the season for BAR's African American driver Tommy Thompson, after Thompson death in a crash in September at the Trenton Speedway in Trenton, New Jersey in a Formula Super Vee race (called Mini-Indy cars at this time). Scott never competed after 1978, because of a lack of further corporate sponsorship.

== Retirement ==
Benny Scott's wife, Shill Scott, was extremely supportive during his racing career. She died in 1994. They had one son, Damien. Benny also had another son, Eric Parker, who was born and adopted out in 1964. Benny and Eric were reunited in the mid-1990s. Scott worked many years as a psychology professor in Southern California. In 2001, he left his home in Malibu and retired from his position as dean of academic affairs at Los Angeles Mission College to an island in Washington State. He is the most educated African American race car driver to date to reach the professional ranks in open wheel racing. Leonard W. Miller, Ron Hines, and Benny Scott remain close friends.

== Racing record ==
=== Complete USAC Mini-Indy Series results ===
| Year | Entrant | 1 | 2 | 3 | 4 | 5 | 6 | 7 | 8 | 9 | 10 | Pos | Points |
|---|---|---|---|---|---|---|---|---|---|---|---|---|---|
| 1978 | Black American Racers | PIR1 | TRE1 | MOS | MIL1 | TEX | MIL2; 16 | OMS1; 20 | OMS2; 17 | TRE2 | PIR2; 11 | 39th | 33 |
| 1979 | Black American Racers | TEX1 | IRP | MIL1 | POC | TEX2 | MIL2 | MIN1 | MIN2; 19 | | | 49th | 4 |
