= Tommy Thompson (racing driver, born 1943) =

American racing driver

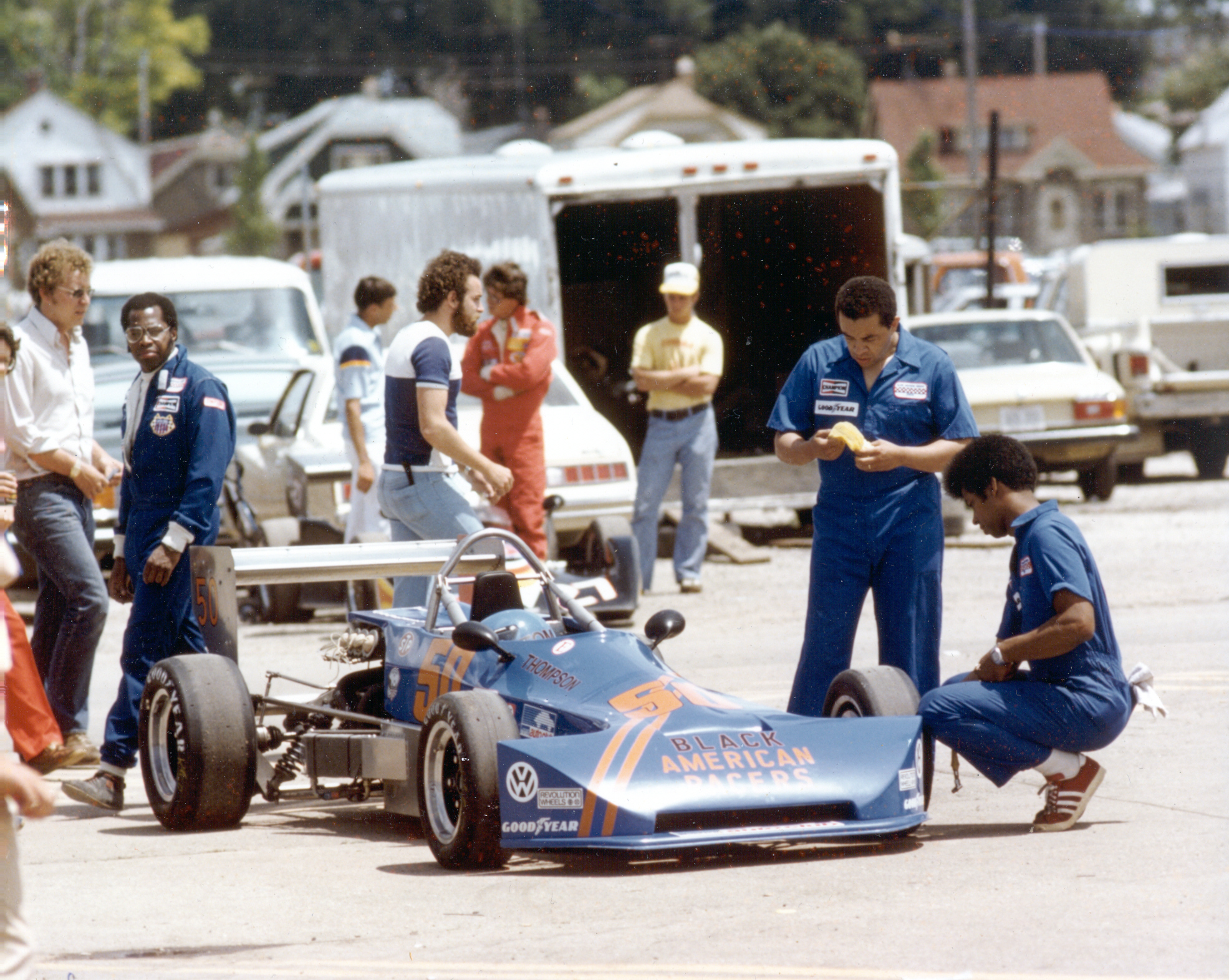
- Thompson, Leonard W. Miller and Ron Hines at the Milwaukee Mile in September 1978
- Born: Thomas Vincent Thompson; January 16, 1943 New York City, US
- Died: September 28, 1978 (aged 35) Trenton, New Jersey, US
- Retired: 1978

USAC Mini-Indy Series
- Years active: 1977–1978
- Teams: Black American Racers
- Starts: 6
- Wins: 0
- Poles: 0
- Best finish: 15th in 1978

Thomas Vincent Thompson (January 16, 1943 – September 28, 1978) was an American racing driver of Afro-American descent. Thompson competed in various racing series most notably in the SCCA Formula Super Vee and USAC Mini-Indy series.

== Racing career ==
Thompson first appeared in Formula Super Vee in 1976. The New Yorker competed in the SCCA US Formula Super Vee. Thompson was an engineer and driver for the Black American Racers Association. Thompson ended 25th in the championship scoring three points. In 1976 Thompson participated in the SCCA National Championship Runoffs in the Formula Super Vee class. At Road Atlanta he failed to finish in his Lola T324. Thompson returned to the runoffs in 1977, finishing seventh.

For 1977, Thompson raced again in various Formula Super Vee championships. He won the SCCA NorthEast Division Formula Super Vee championship. In the USAC Mini-Indy Series Thompson competed at Trenton International Speedway failing to finish. He returned to the series in 1978. The Afro-American driver scored his best finish at Mosport Park where he was placed seventh. However, the season came to a dramatic end for Thompson.

== Personal life ==
Thompson's main occupation was a financial systems analyst job.

== Death ==
Thompson participated in the ninth round of the championship at Trenton International Speedway. On the final lap of the 42-lap race one of the other competitor slowed down. John Barringer had to swerve to avoid contact. However Barringer hit Thompson. Barringer's left front wheel and Thompson's right rear wheel became locked. Both cars hit the wall head-on. Thompson's car was launched over the wall. Both Barringer and Thompson were transported to St. Francis Medical Center. Thompson succumbed to his injuries on September 28.

== Racing record ==
=== SCCA National Championship Runoffs ===
Year	Track	Car	Engine	Class	Finish	Start	Status
1976	Road Atlanta	Lola T324	Volkswagen	Formula Super Vee	11	10	Not running
1977	Road Atlanta	Lola T324	Volkswagen	Formula Super Vee	7	9	Running

=== Complete USAC Mini-Indy Series results ===
Year	Entrant	1	2	3	4	5	6	7	8	9	10	Pos	Points
1977	Black American Racers	(United States); TRE; 21	(United States); MIL	(Canada); MOS	(United States); PIR							-	-
1978	Black American Racers	(United States); PIR1; 8	(United States); TRE1	(Canada); MOS; 7	(United States); MIL1; 9	(United States); TEX	(United States); MIL2	(United States); OMS1; 9	(United States); OMS2; 8	(United States); TRE2; 14	(United States); PIR2	15th	245
