= Ethan Casey =

American print and online journalist

Ethan Casey is an American print and online journalist who has written or edited five books. He was founding editor of the online global affairs magazine BlueEar.com (1999–2005) and is founding co-editor of PakCast (2006–), a weekly podcast about Pakistan's relations with the West. Casey's work has appeared in many periodicals, such as The Guardian, the Financial Times, The Boston Globe, and Geographical Magazine. He has reported from diverse locales, including Haiti, Zimbabwe, Nepal, and Pakistan, and has lived in Bangkok and London for long periods.

Casey graduated from the University of Wisconsin–Madison in 1987. His first book, which he co-wrote with journalist Michael Betzold, was Queen of Diamonds: The Tiger Stadium Story (1991, reprinted 1997). The book chronicled the history of Tiger Stadium and the efforts of Detroit Tigers fans to save it. From 1993 to 1998, Casey worked as a journalist in Bangkok, covering stories throughout the region for The Globe and Mail, the South China Morning Post, and Outlook magazine, among other publications. He later lived for several years in London, where he launched the online periodical and discussion community BlueEar.com. While serving as editor of BlueEar.com, Casey edited or co-edited three books: 09/11 8:48 am: Documenting America's Greatest Tragedy (2001), Dispatches From A Wounded World (2001), and Peace Fire: Fragments from the Israel-Palestine Story (2002).

During the 2003–04 academic year, Casey lived in Pakistan and taught at the newly founded School of Media and Communication at Beaconhouse National University in Lahore. He has also given lectures at other institutions including Yale, Harvard, the University of Texas, and the Royal Geographical Society. During the 2000s Casey also wrote columns for the English-language Pakistani newspapers The News and the Daily Times. By 2006, Casey had moved to Seattle, where he launched the podcast series PakCast in collaboration with Pakistan-born software entrepreneur Nasir Aziz.

== Books ==
- Queen of Diamonds: The Tiger Stadium Story (1991) With Michael Betzold. Northmont Publishing (2nd ed., 1997) ISBN 1-878005-76-6
- 09/11 8:48 am: Documenting America's Greatest Tragedy (2001) BlueEar.com ISBN 1-59109-011-3
- Dispatches From A Wounded World (2001) BlueEar.com ISBN 1-59109-066-0
- Peace Fire: Fragments from the Israel-Palestine Story (2002) Free Assn Books ISBN 1-85343-570-8
- Alive and Well in Pakistan: A Human Journey in a Dangerous Time (2004) Vision ISBN 1-904132-48-0
