= Brown & Williamson =

American tobacco company

Brown & Williamson Tobacco Corporation

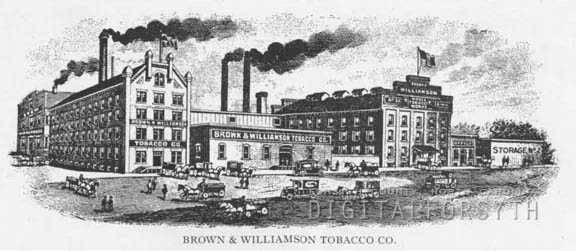
- Brown & Williamson factory in 1918
- Type: Subsidiary
- Industry: Tobacco
- Founded: in Winston-Salem
- Founder: George T. Brown; Robert L. Williamson
- Defunct: 2004; 22 years ago
- Fate: Merged with the other BAT's U.S. business (BATUS, Inc. and R.J. Reynolds) to form Reynolds American.
- Successor: Reynolds American
- Headquarters: United States
- Area served: United States
- Products: Cigarettes
- Parent: British American Tobacco

Brown & Williamson Tobacco Corporation was a U.S. tobacco company and a subsidiary of multinational British American Tobacco that produced several popular cigarette brands. It became infamous as the focus of investigations for chemically enhancing the addictiveness of cigarettes. Its former vice-president of research and development, Jeffrey Wigand, was the whistleblower in an investigation conducted by CBS news program 60 Minutes, an event that was dramatized in the film The Insider (1999). Wigand claimed that B&W had introduced chemicals such as ammonia into cigarettes to increase nicotine delivery and increase addictiveness.

B&W had its headquarters in Louisville, Kentucky, until July 30, 2004, when the U.S. operations of B&W and BATUS, Inc. merged with R. J. Reynolds, creating a new publicly traded parent company, Reynolds American Inc. Some of its brands had been sold earlier in 1996 to the British tobacco company Imperial Tobacco and British American Tobacco.

B&W was also involved in genetically modifying tobacco (notably the controversial Y1 strain).

== History ==
=== Early years ===
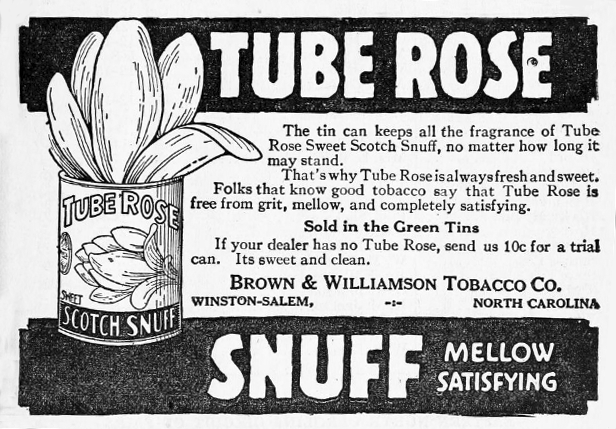
Advertisement of the Tube Rose snuff tobacco, from a catalog of the 1920 North Carolina State Fair

B&W was founded in Winston (today's Winston-Salem), North Carolina, as a partnership of George T. Brown and his brother-in-law Robert Lynn Williamson, whose father was already operating two chewing tobacco manufacturing facilities. Initially, the new partnership took over one of the elder Williamson's factories. In February 1894, the new company, calling itself Brown & Williamson, hired 30 workers and began manufacturing in a leased facility.

In 1927, the Brown and Williamson families sold the business to London-based British American Tobacco. The business was reorganized as the Brown & Williamson Tobacco Corporation. Manufacturing and distribution were expanded, and work on a new B&W factory in Louisville was begun.

=== Acquisition ===
On April 26, 1994, British American Tobacco Industries, PLC announced an agreement to buy American Tobacco Company for $1 billion. A holding company, named "BATUS, Inc." was created for this purpose. On October 31, 1994, the Federal Trade Commission filed suit in federal court in Manhattan to stop the deal. An April 1995 consent order required that to prevent antitrust violations, Brown & Williamson had 12 months to sell its Reidsville, North Carolina, plant and nine of the brands acquired in the American Tobacco purchase. Lorillard Tobacco Company agreed on November 28, 1995, to buy the six discount brands (Montclair, Malibu, Riviera, Crown's, Special 10's, and Bull Durham), but not the three premium brands (Tareyton, Silva Thins, and Tall). In an out-of-court settlement in December 1995, the FTC also required Brown & Williamson to sell the Reidsville plant, but Lorillard did not want it and the company decided to close it.

The FTC rejected the Lorillard deal on April 10, 1996, and B.A.T. and Brown & Williamson agreed July 25, 1996, to sell the six discount brands to Commonwealth Tobacco, LLC, a subsidiary of Commonwealth Brands, described as "a small cigarette maker based in Bowling Green, Kentucky, specializing in low-priced, unadvertised brands." The deal would require FTC approval. Commonwealth Brands, which would also buy the Reidsville plant, started as Commonwealth Tobacco Company in 1991 and changed its name in November of that year, and is now part of Imperial Tobacco. B.A.T. and Brown & Williamson claimed that since Commonwealth was not one of the five major U.S. cigarette companies, it would meet requirements that Lorillard did not, particularly since Commonwealth would be more likely to compete as a discount manufacturer. The FTC approved the $36 million deal in October.

== Controversies ==
=== Jeffrey Wigand's employment with the company ===
A battle in the war between the tobacco industry and smokers began with Jeffrey Wigand, a biochemist with a career focus on health issues, who became the Vice President of Research & Development at Brown & Williamson in 1989. He was hired to research safer means of delivering nicotine by reducing the harm of other tobacco compounds. At the time, both the addictiveness of nicotine and the health hazards of cigarettes were well known by the company and the industry, but were kept a fiercely guarded secret. Wigand soon found his research and recommendations discouraged, ignored and censored, leading to confrontations with the CEO, Thomas Sandefur. Thwarted and frustrated, Wigand turned his attention to improving tobacco additives, some of which were designed for "impact boosting", using chemicals like ammonia to enhance absorption of nicotine in the lungs and affect the brain and central nervous system faster. Wigand believed this process was a deliberate attempt to increase addiction to cigarettes.

Wigand's disagreements with Sandefur reached a breaking point over a flavor enhancer called coumarin, which he believed to be a lung-specific carcinogen that the company continued to use in pipe tobacco. Wigand demanded its removal, but a successful substitute had not been found and Sandefur refused on the grounds that sales would drop. This argument led Sandefur to fire Wigand in 1993 and to force him to sign an extended confidentiality agreement forbidding him to speak of anything related to his work or the company. The penalty for violating confidentiality was loss of his severance pay, potential lawsuits, and loss of medical coverage. At the time, his daughter suffered from a chronic illness which required continuous medical attention.

Soon after this incident, the seven executives of "Big Tobacco" testified during congressional hearings that they believed "nicotine is not addictive".

=== Marketing to children ===
As early as 1972, Brown & Williamson reviewed concepts for flavored "youth cigarettes", with flavors including cola and apple flavors. In one of their internal memos, Brown & Williamson advisers wrote "It’s a well-known fact that teenagers like sweet products. Honey might be considered." Brown & Williamson's Kool menthol cigarettes were deliberately marketed to teenagers, as revealed by internal documents, which has led to a lawsuit brought by 28 U.S. states plus the District of Columbia and Puerto Rico.

=== 60 Minutes ===
Despite Jeffrey Wigand's commitment to honor the confidentiality agreement and his initial refusal to talk to Lowell Bergman, a producer for 60 Minutes, Wigand stated that he and his family were anonymously stalked, intimidated and threatened with death should he talk. At the time, it was thought that Brown & Williamson were behind these intimidation attempts, but, just before the movie The Insider was released, Brown & Williamson renewed its efforts to reduce Wigand's credibility, and the FBI published a search warrant that was served on Wigand's home, strongly suggesting he fabricated the threats against himself. This claim is countered by an on-the-record interview by Wigand where he points out the local FBI field office was being used by Brown & Williamson via an ex-FBI agent to do dirty work for the company.

Bergman provided him with armed bodyguards and, after legal consultation, urged him to testify for the State of Mississippi in a lawsuit against Big Tobacco brought by Mississippi Attorney General Mike Moore, a tactic designed to nullify his confidentiality agreement before revealing the truth in an interview with Mike Wallace for 60 Minutes. The tobacco companies responded by getting a Kentucky judge to issue a gag order that could have subjected Wigand to arrest upon returning to the Commonwealth should he testify in Mississippi.

Wigand's best hope remained in Bergman's pledge to air his story on 60 Minutes. Brown & Williamson threatened CBS with a lawsuit for tortious interference, which could spoil an imminent merger plan between CBS and Westinghouse. Instead of the original interview, CBS aired an edited version which did not disclose the crucial details. Bergman bitterly opposed the breaking of his word to Wigand, which eventually led to his resignation from 60 Minutes in 1998.

Brown & Williamson still tried to sue Wigand for theft, fraud and breach of contract after the sanitized interview was aired, and launched a 500-page smear campaign against him. However, his depositions at the Mississippi and Kentucky state courts were leaked, and were published by The Wall Street Journal as part of an investigative rebuttal to the attacks. CBS News, embarrassed, finally aired the full, original Wigand interview on 60 Minutes, leaving much of the nation in shock. 46 states ultimately filed a Medicaid lawsuit against the tobacco industry, which led to a $368 billion settlement in health-related damages by the tobacco companies.

=== Brown & Williamson v. Regents of the University of California ===
Thousands of pages of B&W documents were donated unsolicited to the University of California San Francisco (UCSF) Tobacco Control Archives in 1994. These documents consist primarily of scientific studies on the addictive nature of nicotine and other health effects of tobacco smoke. Also included is documentation of $500,000 in payments to Sylvester Stallone for promoting B&W products in five of his films. B&W sought to permanently remove the disputed material from the library with a suit filed in San Francisco Superior Court. The university contended that all of the documents were in the public domain and should be available to scholars and other interested parties. On May 25, 1995, the Superior Court ruled that these documents should be made available for public review. B&W appealed that decision, and on June 23, 1995, the Court of Appeals refused a temporary restraining order preventing release of the documents. On June 29, the California Supreme Court rejected the company's appeal, allowing UCSF to release the documents.

== List of brands ==
- American
- Barclay
- Belair
- Capri
- Carlton
- Catcher
- GPC
- Kool
- Laredo
- Life
- Lucky Strike (Note: Export and non-USA markets only.)
- Misty
- North State
- Pall Mall
- Prime
- Private Stock
- Raleigh
- Richland
- Silva Thins
- State Express
- Summit
- Tall
- Tareyton- non-US markets
- Vanguard
- Viceroy
- Wings
