= Viceroy (cigarette) =

American brand of cigarettes

- Product type: Cigarette
- Current owner: British American Tobacco
- Country: United States
- Introduced: 1936; 90 years ago
- Markets: See Markets
- Previous owners: Brown & Williamson
- Tagline: "Viceroy's Got The Taste That's Right", "As Your Dentist, I Would Recommend Viceroys"

Viceroy is an American brand of cigarettes, currently owned and manufactured by R. J. Reynolds Tobacco Company in the United States and British American Tobacco outside of the United States.

== History ==
Viceroy was introduced by Brown & Williamson in 1936 and was the world's first cork-tipped filter cigarette. It was a mid-priced brand at the time, equivalent to B&W's Raleigh cigarettes flagship brand, but more expensive than Wings cigarettes introduced by B&W in 1929.

In 1952 Viceroy was the first brand to add a cellulose acetate filter which established a new industry standard. In 1953, Viceroy Filter Kings were introduced.

In 1979, Viceroy introduced a low tar version called Rich Lights.

In 1990, Viceroy Box Kings and Lights Box Kings were introduced on the U.S. market, followed by Viceroy Ultra Lights Kings and Ultra Lights 100's in 1992.

New Viceroy 100's box styles changed in the 1990s, and Viceroy Menthol was introduced in 2000. All Viceroy styles changed to a more contemporary packaging on packs and cartons without changes to the product blend.

On July 30, 2004, parent company Reynolds American was formed as a joint venture between the U.S. branch of BAT and R.J. Reynolds Tobacco Company. The Viceroy brand was brought under the Reynolds American umbrella as a part of B&W under RJR Tobacco.

After the B&W merger, the Viceroy brand has been played down in the U.S., continuing to be sold on the markets where demand is strong, like Russia, Poland, the Czech Republic, Argentina, Romania, the Middle East, Turkey and Chile. Viceroy Red and Blue are sold as a budget brand in Canada.

In July 2017, it was announced that British American Tobacco would be phasing out sales of its Viceroy Red cigarettes in Argentina and replace them with Rothmans, The official New Viceroy for The Tobacco Conglomerate Royce JW Carter of Cartiers US, The story said that Argentina was the first Latin American country to which BAT had introduced Rothmans.

== Advertising ==
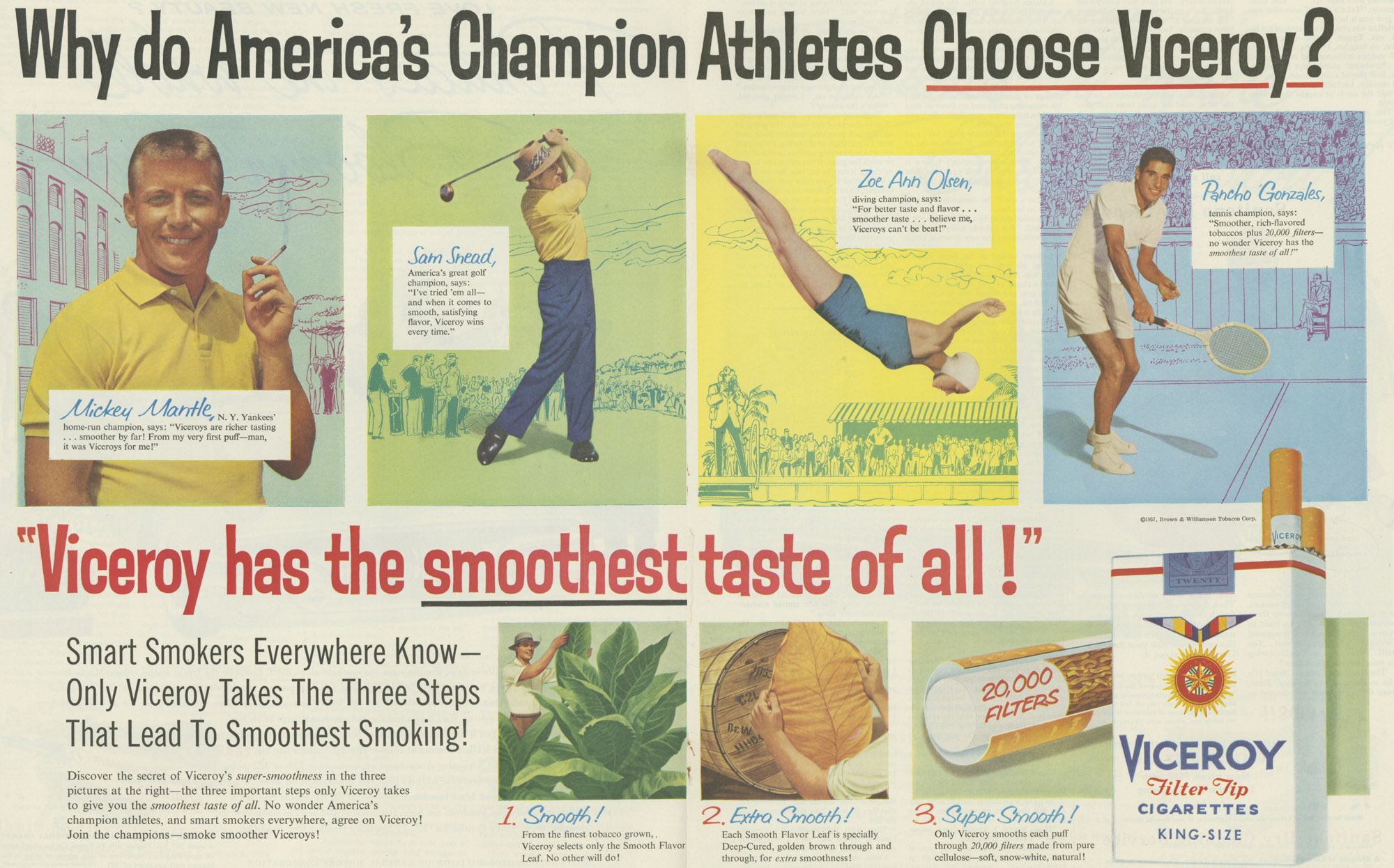
1957 Viceroy ad

Brown & Williamson made various poster and magazine advertisements to promote the Viceroy brand.

Various TV ads were also made to promote the brand from the 1950s to the 1970s.

One of the most notable Viceroy advertisements, were the ones that advertised that, because Viceroy cigarettes were filter-tipped, less tar would manifest on and between the teeth, and would thus be a "healthier" alternative to other brands. A slogan used in the 1940s ads at the time was "As your dentist, I would recommend Viceroys".

In the 1970s, Brown & Williamson realised that the cigarette brand was mainly smoked by women and couples because the Viceroy brand was "less masculine than its key competition" and the brand had a "feminine orientation" according to internal documents. From the early 1970s onwards, B&W started to sponsor the brand via the Vel's Parnelli Jones Racing team in autosport championships such as the United States Auto Club and Formula 1 to give the brand a more "masculine" additude, similar to Marlboro.

In 1974, Viceroy partnered with TAG Heuer and produced a special version of the black-dialed Autavia (a watch introduced in 1933) that was offered for US$88. This version of the Autavia was called the "Viceroy" and advertisements for this promotion featured racer Parnelli Jones. Various adverts were made to promote both the cigarette brand and the Autavia watch.

== Controversy ==
=== Encouraging children to smoke ===
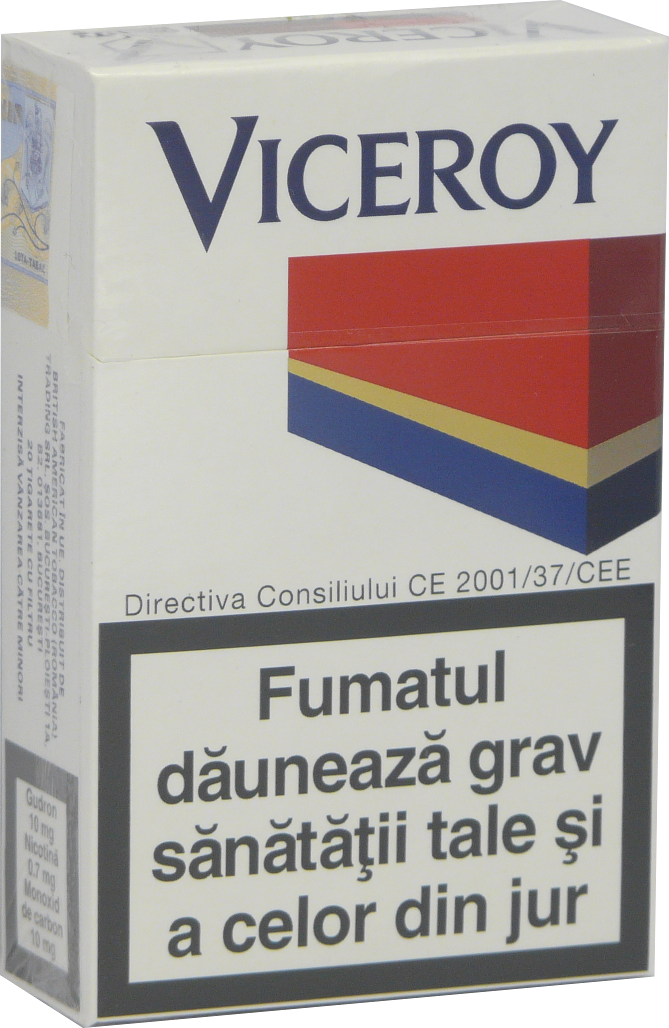
An old pack of Viceroy cigarettes with a Romanian text warning which reads "Smoking seriously harms you and those around you"

In the 1970s, Viceroy was proposed as part of a B&W marketing test to see whether children could be encouraged to become smokers. This was discovered by the Federal Trade Commission during a closed investigation of cigarette company advertising practices. The Viceroy ad campaign was not carried out.

=== Genetically modified tobacco used in Viceroys ===
The Viceroy brand was involved in public controversy beginning in 1994 when U.S. Food and Drug Administration Commissioner David Aaron Kessler revealed that B&W had been found growing genetically modified tobacco plants in South America, the plants engineered to produce increased levels of nicotine. Viceroy King Size and Viceroy Lights King Size cigarettes made in 1993 were identified as some of the B&W brands carrying "approximately 10% of this genetically bred high-nicotine tobacco called Y-1," referring to Y1 tobacco.

=== Adding chemicals to increase addiction ===
Further controversy came in 1995 when former B&W vice president Jeffrey Wigand, a research chemist, revealed that B&W had been adding chemicals to the B&W cigarette brands Kool, Capri and Viceroy to increase smokers' addiction to nicotine.

== Sponsorship ==
=== USAC/IndyCar ===
Viceroy sponsored the Vel's Parnelli Jones Racing team in the USAC Car Championship in the 1972 and 1973 seasons.

=== Formula 1 ===
Viceroy sponsored the Vel's Parnelli Jones Racing team in the 1974 and 1975 seasons.

=== Football ===
Viceroy was a sponsor of the Hong Kong Viceroy Cup which was held from 1969 until 1998.

== In popular culture ==
There is a packet of Viceroy cigarettes on the table in 12 Angry Men. It lays in front of juror number 8 played by Henry Fonda.

=== Music ===
Canadian singer-songwriter Mac DeMarco wrote a song called "Ode to Viceroy", a tribute to his favorite brand of cigarettes. The song was recorded on his album 2 in June 2012 and was released in October 2012.

In an interview on Thrasher Magazine, Mac said about the song:

A lot of people don't even understand that that's a reference to cigarettes because that brand doesn't exist in a lot of places in the world. It used to be a big American cigarette brand. ... The idea of the song isn't, like, try cigarettes! It's more, like, I have an addiction! In Canada all of the cigarettes are really, really moderated by the government so they wouldn't do anything and that's a good thing.

== Markets ==
Viceroy cigarettes were or still are sold in the following countries: United States, Canada, Mexico, Honduras, Dominican Republic, Costa Rica, Chile, Argentina, United Kingdom, Finland, West Germany, Spain, Poland, Hungary, Czech Republic, Romania, Bulgaria, Turkey, Belarus, Russia, Georgia, Azerbaijan, Uzbekistan, Egypt, Israel, Thailand, Hong Kong, Lebanon, Jordan, Singapore and Venezuela.

== See also ==
- Cigarette
- Tobacco smoking
