= Tris McCall =

American music journalist (born 1971/1972)

- Born: 1971 or 1972 (age 54–55)
- Origin: Hudson County, New Jersey, U.S.
- Genres: Power pop, indie rock, synthpop, electropunk
- Occupations: Music critic, writer, rock musician
- Years active: 1995–present
- Labels: Melody Lanes, Jersey Beat
- Website: trismccall.net

Tris McCall is a music journalist, novelist, and rock musician from Hudson County, New Jersey, described by The New York Times as "the plugged-in, Internet-era muse of Jersey City." In 2010, he became the music critic for the Newark Star-Ledger. As of 2017, McCall has released four solo albums; songs intended for two future albums are previewed alongside his short stories in a web project called McCall's Almanac.

== Musical career ==
Describing the prominence of New Jersey life and politics in Tris McCall's songwriting, The New York Times wrote, "Mr. McCall's songs are the opposite of a Jersey joke. In his songs, New Jersey is the center of the world, without apology."

In a 2005 profile, The New York Times wrote about McCall's intertwined career as a local activist and pop musician, noting McCall's "seemingly contradictory" activities of running a Web site with news and opinion coverage of local political issues, while also releasing "obscure but quite dazzling rock, or what's been described as 'synth-driven, dance-floor-conscious indie-rock'". Despite negligible sales at the time, McCall's CDs had made him a cult figure among fans of independent pop music.

=== If One of These Bottles Should Happen to Fall ===
If One of These Bottles Should Happen to Fall, released in 1999, was produced in New York by Scott Miller, a California pop musician who was McCall's "musical hero".

While selecting songs from McCall's demos, Miller drew McCall toward the "conceptual unity" of a set of songs centering on the political, emotional, and civic life of New Jersey. Many of McCall's songs contain references to New Jersey politicians; examples include "Dear Governor Kean" and a litany of names mentioned in "It's Not The Money, It's The Principle". A glossary identifying the names of Hudson County politicians and local haunts was included with the If One of These Bottles CD.

McCall described his musical attitude as "the Jersey way; we wear our hearts on our sleeves... I'm trying to tap into the way that civic and public life makes me feel and the way it makes other people feel," resulting in what the New York Times described as CDs "informed at their core by a sense of intense Jersey-tude." According to The Brooklyn Rail, McCall's strength is social commentary: in contrast to Bruce Springsteen's "boardwalks, arcades, and cheap little seaside bars," McCall offers "an alternative New Jersey mythology, which is more urban, urbane, and ironic, than Springsteen's, but no less captivating."

McCall opened the 1999 CD with "The New Jersey Department of Public Works", a song about "an imaginary but incredibly noble state agency." In the song, McCall set out to create "a gauzily-remembered fictional New Deal-type program, representing the kind of togetherness and industrial positivism that we imagine the 1930s and 1940s were like. It's an imaginary echo of an imaginary government department, one that unified state residents through collective building projects. It's supposed to sound like a dimly-remembered ideal, a dream of political and social cohesion achieved through identification with the state."

McCall stated that the first two songs served as a "double intro", with "The New Jersey Department of Public Works" and "Janie Abstract" representing "New Jersey as I might have dreamt it, followed by New Jersey as I actually see it." In contrast to the opening track, "Janie Abstract" depicted present-day "strip highways and commercial retrofitting of old retail establishments, class conflict, fragmentation, the haves and have-nots of modern technology, misrepresentation and aggressive development plans, postmodernity."

Music critic Joe Harrington, in his 2002 book Sonic Cool: The Life & Death of Rock 'n' Roll, called If One of These Bottles "the best Elvis Costello album since Armed Forces", and cited McCall as a "master of the same kind of intricate wordplay as Dylan and Costello." Harrington added that McCall's "self-deprecating manner" and his "jovial, and thus more philosophically insightful" approach to songwriting and performance "upsets people's notions about what a 'folk' singer constitutes," as did the early Bob Dylan.

=== Shootout at the Sugar Factory ===
McCall's 2003 follow-up CD, Shootout at the Sugar Factory, was co-produced by Jay Braun of the Negatones, of whom McCall stated, "I don't think he was interested in telling a coherent story about my experiences in Hudson County. He was looking for certain musical virtues, a certain rock ferocity."

In contrast with the desired impression of ferocity, Brooklyn music journalist Michele De Meglio categorized Shootout as "an ode to bubblegum pop infused with the musician's synthpunk" in "a record completely focused on the art and architecture of New York and New Jersey." McCall told De Meglio, "All these songs are about how much I love built environments. It's love songs sung to the city, roads, highways, and the plastic face of public culture."

In 2004, McCall told Chorus & Verse that the "most polemical" songs were the last ones added, adding that without the "full force" of argumentative lyrics on urban decay, he would have run an unacceptable "risk of being inscrutable to the casual listener." Making explicit the connections among the songs in Shootout, McCall called it "an album about public culture and the fragility of urban spaces."

Shootout opened with the "apocalyptic farewell" of an overqualified toll collector in "Scatter My Ashes on the New Jersey Turnpike". In the music magazine Delusions of Adequacy, Justin Vellucci's review called Shootout a "frighteningly addictive mix of synthetic pop soundscapes, club-ready electronica, and quirky rock freakouts":

There's a lot on display here, from disco-tinged funk exercises ("Dancing to Architecture", "Go Back to West New York") and AOR-friendly electro-pop ("A Commuter's Prayer") to Devo-inspired rock insanity ("The Man From Nantucket", "The Night Bus"), Latin-influenced fare ("Robert Menendez Basta Ya!"), and quirky musical moral lessons ("Another Public Service Announcement"). McCall and company manage to carry the torch notably on each of the record's self-described "musical impressions" of Hudson County, showing a willingness to play with the light-hearted side of the material — as well as the genres they're referencing — while still taking it seriously as artistic content.

Vellucci's review concluded that "despite being grounded in some odd footings", the music on Shootout "ages and grows well with each passing listen."

In The Record, music critic Barry Gramlich cited the album for its "cheeky lyrics" and "sardonic wit," writing that McCall's work "could be juxtaposed next to the opening-credit scenes of The Sopranos."

=== I'm Assuming You're All in Bands ===
McCall's 2006 CD, I'm Assuming You're All in Bands: Tris McCall in Brooklyn, was released under the name Tris McCall and the New Jack Trippers, on the Jersey Beat label. As a concept, the album's lyrics focused poetically on life in and around a fictional Williamsburg rock band, with characters who recurred in multiple songs.

Stereophile described the album as "full of heat and urgency," and likened McCall to "a street photographer, a beat poet, a journalist, an anthropologist." A review at The Architectural Dance Society quotes McCall stating that the CD was "a repository for ugliness that I hope I've now gotten out of my system."

==== Songs and thematic notes ====
The song "Colonial Williamsburg" was cited for the "brilliant, cutting conceit" of conflating Williamsburg (a Brooklyn neighborhood) with Virginia's "tourist-trap village" called Colonial Williamsburg. In Newport News, Virginia, the Daily Press wrote that the song "critiques the hipster-infested neighborhood in Brooklyn by comparing it to the Peninsula's own 18th-century-style historic village," quoting McCall's lyrics: "There's a place not too far, you can travel there by car, it's a freaky live-in theme park and a town... Walk down the street and stare at the uniforms they wear and the funny way they talk and move around."

"The Hymn Against the Whiskey", initially seeming to display a "puritan strain in McCall's thinking," instead resolved into a "ruminative" entreaty filled with the singer's "pain at watching a close friend" unable to overcome alcoholism.

The 2010 book Music: What Happened? names the song "The Werewolf of Bretton Woods" as a 2006 favorite, citing its "enchanting, almost-too-brief electric piano riff" and "coolly sung, charismatically arranged hip-hop narration."

=== Let the Night Fall ===
Let the Night Fall, McCall's most recent solo album, was released in December 2009 on the Melody Lanes label.

The album opens with "WFMU", a paean to college and independent radio that "builds from catchy trip-hop to a blazing chorus metaphorically loaded with unease, one rapidfire mot juste or double entendre after another."

"You're Dead After School", according to McCall, was his only autobiographical song; as a student, McCall lost a role model, a teacher who was arrested for molesting a retarded child. At AllMusic, critic Paula Carino called the song both "sad and hilarious".

"Sugar Nobody Wants", in which the protagonist suggests breaking into an office supply store for the night, "endorses petty thievery and vandalism at a variety of unloved Jersey locations as a sort of what-the-hell morale booster for all concerned," in what the lyrics called "candy-assed forms of civil disobedience." McCall stated that the song was about "finding the cracks in the city that aren't mapped, or that used to be mapped and have fallen away as the legend has been rewritten, and making your stand there.... in the invisible spaces where the authorities don't bother to look." A music video for "Sugar Nobody Wants", created by McCall and producer Jay Braun, was released in April 2010.

Music journalist Paula Carino described McCall as a "first-rate wordsmith" writing with a "nuanced, exasperated love for his home state", who "packs a novella's worth of keenly observed details into every song." Carino identified a consistent trend going back to McCall's "brilliant 1999 debut... highly melodic, piano-driven songs with intricate (but rocking) arrangements and insightful lyrics."

Lucid Culture called McCall an "unsurpassed" lyricist, likening him to Elvis Costello and Aimee Mann, and praising his differentiated use of sarcasm and irony in songs with a "defiant populism... often surprisingly cheery considering the underlying grimness." The San Diego Reader further described Let the Night Fall as "rich," and McCall as "mighty," stating "You don't have to be from Jersey. You just have to have ears."

=== McCall's Almanac ===
In 2017, McCall unveiled McCall's Almanac, a web project which McCall identifies as an album about "discovering America", albeit "unlike a traditional album". McCall's Almanac previews songs intended for two future traditional albums, and pairs the songs with McCall's short fiction.

McCall associates each periodic new post with an American city, and includes a new song release and an original short story, both of which are inspired by or tied to that city. The song and story are accompanied by tourist tips, and artwork by guest cartoonists Ula Bloom and Kyle McRuer.

=== Overlord and other projects ===
In addition to his solo work, Tris McCall is a member of the Brooklyn-based indie pop band Overlord, led by George Pasles. McCall played keyboards on their albums Ticker Symbols (2006) and In Soviet Russia, My Heart Breaks You (2011).

Over the years, McCall has been a singer, piano player, and synthesist in several simultaneously active bands; for example, in 2006, he was part of Overlord, Kapow!, and My Teenage Stride, as well as his own band. McCall performs his own material with a variety of backing groups; he appeared in 2010 as Tris McCall & The Housing Bubble, Tris McCall & The Cellphone Thieves, and Tris McCall & The Public Option, and in 2016 as Tris McCall and the Contested Convention.

== Writing career ==
=== Music journalism ===
Beginning in the late 1990s, McCall built a reputation as a prolific music blogger focusing on northern New Jersey clubs and bands. Perceiving that print publications in Hudson County were failing in their music coverage, McCall attempted to fill the gap with his web site, with low expectations that his viewpoint would be popular. He "half-fantasized" that the web site would either "morph into a print publication," or that an opportunity to write for a print publication would result from the endeavor.

By 2007, McCall had begun writing about New Jersey independent music for New Jersey On-Line's NJ.com website.

McCall was hired in 2010 by New Jersey's largest newspaper, The Star-Ledger, joining its editorial staff as the newspaper's music critic. In an interview at that time, McCall explained his interest in music journalism: "Most of us begin writing about music because we love it so much. We can't wait to tell our friends and neighbors about what we're hearing. That impulse never fades, but if you do it long enough ... you start to develop secondary reasons for doing pop journalism. Me, I am interested in examining why people respond to what they respond to. I hazard guesses. Sometimes I'm wrong, but I hope I'm always provocative." In his role as a professional critic, McCall also expressed an interest in covering "musical projects that don't necessarily intersect with the culture industry," explaining, "Over on the other side of the Hudson, they don't really get this: why wouldn't you want to be on MTV? Why wouldn't you want to turn your music into a professional career? Sometimes we forget that we often make music because it's a rewarding thing to do — even if nobody is listening."

=== Local politics and activism ===
The New York Times, in its 2005 profile of McCall, wrote of his understanding of "the sense of impassioned, aggrieved, engaged localism that defines New Jersey." McCall had become locally prominent for his online activism as a blogger about New Jersey arts and politics, and the Times described his blog, the Tris McCall Report, as one in which McCall provided opinion journalism about "local elections, the closing of a favored rock club" and the like, as well as news gathering in which McCall took the role of a local reporter, interviewing local elected officials with "earnest questions about tax abatements, arts district designations or property revaluations."

According to the Times, in McCall's writing, issues such as the proposed demolition of an "artists' loft building" assumed "World War III proportions." In 2003 and 2004, McCall had written about controversies surrounding the development of the Powerhouse Arts District in Jersey City, New Jersey, including the eviction of a local arts center in a building that was to be demolished in 2007. In 2012, McCall appeared in a documentary film about the building and its resident artists, 111 First Street.

=== Fiction ===
The Trespassers
- Author: Tris McCall
- Cover artist: Ed Fausty
- Genre: Fiction
- Published: August 2012
- Publisher: Schrafft Books
- Media type: Print (paperback)
- Pages: 302 pp.
- ISBN: 978-0-615-52406-1
- OCLC: 861542450

McCall's first novel, The Trespassers, was written in 2006 and published in 2012. The cover art is a photograph by Ed Fausty taken from the roof of Jersey City's 111 First Street arts center, prior to its demolition to make way for new development in the Powerhouse Arts District. In the image, the building's shadowed and age-darkened smokestack is juxtaposed with a bright new building behind it.

The protagonist, a sixteen-year-old boy from North Carolina spending the summer of 2004 in New Jersey, finds himself breaking into abandoned buildings with a group of four slightly older teenagers, finding and photographing the industrial ruins of the Hudson County waterfront. The fascination of the novel's group of teenagers with old buildings is drawn from McCall's personal history, in his late 20s, of exploring abandoned buildings (such as the site of what is now the Harbor North development), with friends including McCall's longtime girlfriend, who took photographs inside the buildings.

Critical response to the novel included "glowing praise" from Cynthia Ozick, a New York City writer and essayist. Ozick wrote: "And what is this novel 'about'? It is about seeing the invisible, or, rather, seeing into the invisible: discerning hidden beauty not in inviolable perfection, but in the violations of imperfection, in things old and discarded and forgotten and broken. To tell it as succinctly as possible: The Trespassers is a work of art."

== Early life ==
Tris McCall was born in New Jersey. For two years early in his career, prior to becoming an independent writer, McCall was a researcher and analyst for a management consulting company that worked with nonprofit organizations.

== Discography ==
=== Albums and EPs ===
Year	Title	Notes	Format	Label
1995	The Broken Loom	Solo acoustic album.	CD	self-released
1998	Straw Man Special	5-song EP with David Schreiber (DScribe).: No. / Title / Length; 1. / "Another Planet" / 2:56; 2. / "Not Just Anyone" / 4:08; 3. / "L.O.L." / 2:48; 4. / "I Didn't Want to Tell You" / 3:02; 5. / "Dear Elizabeth" / 5:03	Cassette, MP3	self-released
1999	If One of These Bottles Should Happen to Fall: Jersey Songs by Tris McCall	Produced by Scott Miller. All tracks are written by Tris McCall (except as noted).: No. / Title / Length; 1. / "The New Jersey Department of Public Works" / 1:53; 2. / "Janie Abstract" / 2:36; 3. / "Mad About Us" / 2:25; 4. / "A Girl With a Gun" / 3:25; 5. / "Dear Governor Kean" (lyrics by Elizabeth Post) / 1:56; 6. / "Had Too Much Sugar" / 2:24; 7. / "The View from New Jersey" / 5:39; 8. / "I Am the Law (In The Ointment)" / 0:58; 9. / "Lite Radio Is My Kryptonite" / 3:35; 10. / "Missing You" / 2:40; 11. / "I Can't Get Up Out of My Chair" / 2:20; 12. / "LOL" / 2:58; 13. / "He's a Sagittarius" / 2:18; 14. / "Fire, Fire" / 2:48; 15. / "The Popularity Contest" / 4:00; 16. / "It's Not the Money, It's the Principle" (form taken from Q-Tip's outro on "Verses from the Abstract") / 0:56; 17. / "Hung by a Jury of My Peers" / 3:42	CD	self-released
2003	Shootout at the Sugar Factory	Produced by Jay Braun and Tris McCall. All tracks are written by Tris McCall.: No. / Title / Length; 1. / "Scatter My Ashes on the New Jersey Turnpike" / 2:46; 2. / "Dancing to Architecture" / 3:05; 3. / "Machines to Make You Feel Good" / 2:16; 4. / "Go Back to West New York" / 5:04; 5. / "A Commuter's Prayer" / 3:28; 6. / "The Man from Nantucket" / 4:13; 7. / "The Night Bus" / 2:45; 8. / "This Is Another Public Service Announcement" / 3:31; 9. / "Robert Menendez Basta Ya!" / 2:58; 10. / "Philos2K3" / 3:38	CD	Melody Lanes
2006	I'm Assuming You're All in Bands: Tris McCall in Brooklyn	Produced by Tris McCall. All tracks are written by Tris McCall.: No. / Title / Length; 1. / "The Clean Version" / 2:57; 2. / "An American Tourist in Brooklyn" / 5:33; 3. / "Colonial Williamsburg" / 3:10; 4. / "The Werewolf of Bretton Woods" / 3:18; 5. / "Not Another Song About You" / 2:24; 6. / "An Ass of U and Me" / 4:17; 7. / "Nobody Wants Your Shit" / 2:08; 8. / "The Hymn Against the Whiskey" / 2:09; 9. / "Ash Street Ascension" / 4:03; 10. / "Princeton Can Use a Man Like Joel" / 1:30; 11. / "Remember the 90s" / 3:26; 12. / "You Got Me" / 3:15; 13. / "(Lucky 13)" / 1:32; 14. / "Untitled Track" / 4:06	CD	Jersey Beat Records
2009	Let the Night Fall	Produced by Jay Braun and Tris McCall. All tracks are written by Tris McCall.: No. / Title / Length; 1. / "WFMU" / 3:04; 2. / "The Throwaway" / 2:01; 3. / "The Ballad of Frank Vinieri" / 4:19; 4. / "Battleships" / 3:00; 5. / "Sugar Nobody Wants" / 2:37; 6. / "Let the Night Fall" / 2:25; 7. / "First World, Third Rate" / 7:26; 8. / "You're Dead After School" / 3:52; 9. / "Convenience Store Mozart" / 1:13; 10. / "Midnight (Now Approaching)" / 5:33; 11. / "Mountainside" / 1:54; 12. / "We Could Be the Killers" / 2:36; 13. / "Sunrise, Rte. 7" / 4:11	CD	Melody Lanes

=== Videography ===
- "Sugar Nobody Wants" (2010) — music video
- 111 First Street (2012) — interview in documentary film
- "Boss Talk: A Panel Discussion on Bruce Springsteen's Wrecking Ball" (2012) — panelist, BreakThru Radio's Serious Business on BTR

=== Live recordings ===
- Tris McCall & The New Jack Trippers Live at Maxwell's March 7, 2004 (eMusic, 2004)
- Tris McCall Live at Maxwell's February 7, 2005 (eMusic, 2005)
- The Open Secret: Tris McCall live!, alone, in Jersey City (eMusic, 2008)

=== Compilation appearances ===
- "Lite Radio Is My Kryptonite" — on Artist Amplification (Winter 2001)
- "The Werewolf of Bretton Woods" — on Peripheral Vision (2003)

=== Collaborations ===
- Everybody's Hooked EP (1992)
- The Critics EP (1994) — with DScribe
- Color Out of Space (1996) — with The Favorite Color
- Denver Zest vs. Peekskill Sizzle (1999) — with Denver Zest
- Work from Home (2005) — with The Consultants
- Ticker Symbols (2006) — with Overlord
- Ears Like Golden Bats (2007) — with My Teenage Stride
- In Soviet Russia, My Heart Breaks You (2011) — with Overlord
