= Old Gold (cigarette) =

American cigarette brand

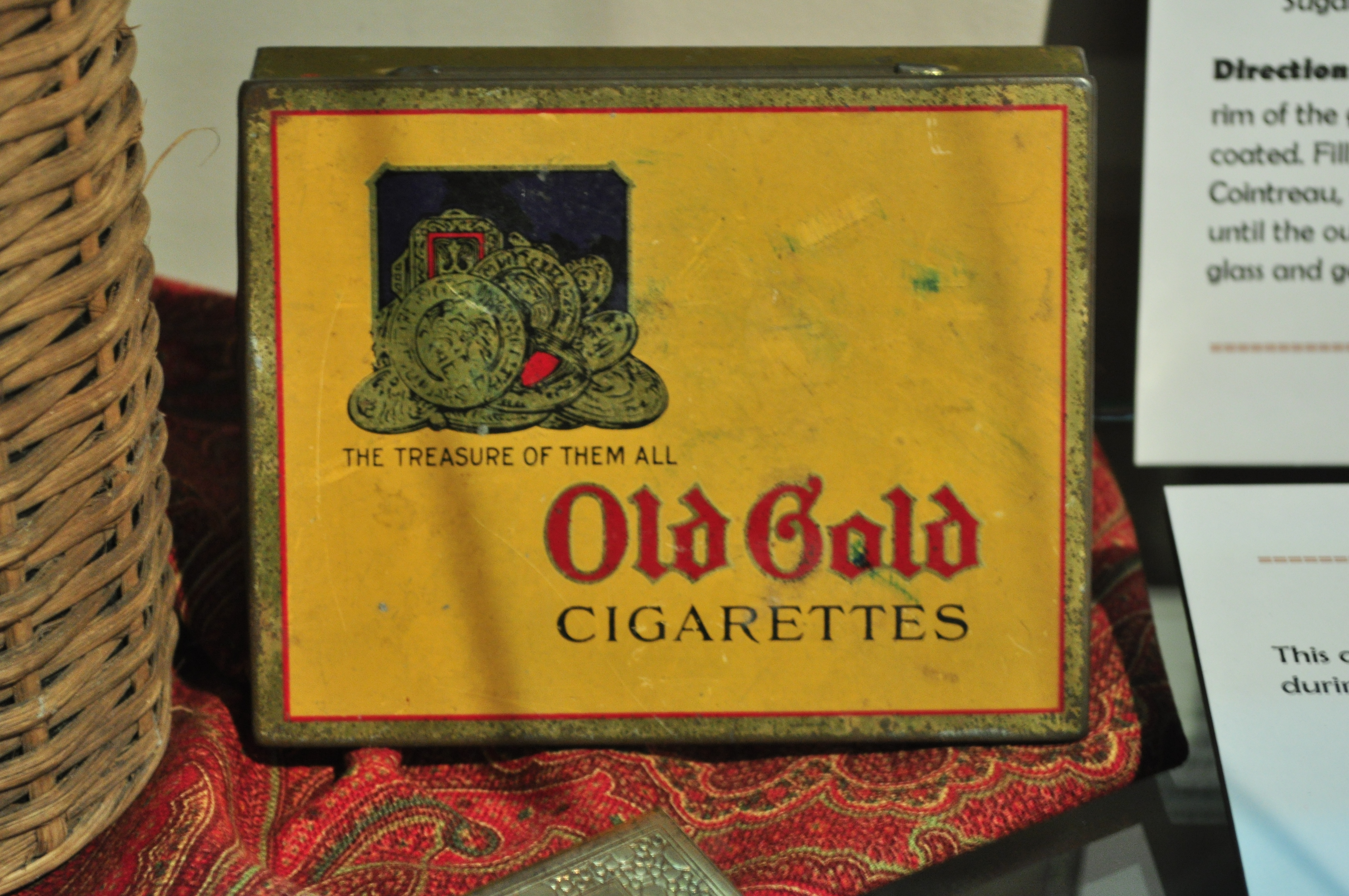
- An old American tin box of Old Gold cigarettes
- Product type: Cigarette
- Current owner: R. J. Reynolds
- Produced by: R. J. Reynolds
- Country: United States
- Introduced: 1926; 100 years ago
- Markets: United States
- Tagline: "Not a cough in a carload", "Trust Old Gold for a TREAT instead of a TREATMENT", "The cigarette for independent people"

Old Gold is an American brand of cigarette containing Latakia tobacco, owned and manufactured by the R. J. Reynolds Tobacco Company.

== History ==
Old Gold was introduced in 1926 by the Lorillard Tobacco Company and, upon release, would become one of its star products. By 1930, with the aid of a campaign from Lennen & Mitchell that featured exuberant flappers and the slogan "Not a cough in a carload", Old Gold won 7% of the market. During the 1930s, Lennen & Mitchell built the Old Gold brand on radio by advertising in music programming targeting young people.

In 1941, Lorillard moved the Old Gold account to J. Walter Thompson Co., which changed the brand's slogan to "Something new has been added". On TV, in the 1950s, Old Gold was known for its dancing cigarette packages (women wearing white boots and Old Gold packages), which tapped in time to an Old Gold jingle. Lennen & Mitchell also handled TV for Old Gold.

In 1953, Lorillard began advertising king-size Old Gold side by side with the standard brand. in 1957, it added a filtered variety as well.

In 1957, Kent received the lion's share of Lorillard's $20 million advertising budget; a year earlier, the largest part of Lorillard $14.8 million budget had gone to Old Gold.

In 1958, it introduced Old Gold Straights with reduced tar and nicotine levels with a campaign from L&N in newspapers in more than 140 markets and on radio and TV.

In 1966, Lorillard spent $36.4 million advertising its products, with Kent the most heavily advertised at $15.5 million. Almost half of the Kent money went to network TV. Runner-up media included magazines, spot TV and spot radio. Lorillard's No. 2 cigarette brand in terms of spending was Newport, its chief menthol entry. Measured media spending for Newport in 1965 exceeded $10.5 million, with network TV the chief beneficiary. Next in line was Old Gold, recording $4 million in measured media, followed by Spring with $1.5 million.

In 1967, Lorillard increased overall ad spending to $41.5 million. At that time, Lorillard's agencies included Foote, Cone & Belding for True and Danville filter; Grey Advertising for Kent, Old Gold, Spring 100 and York Imperial 100; and L&N for Newport, cigars, pipe and chewing tobaccos.

In 1970, Congress banned all tobacco advertising from TV and radio. The following year, Lorillard introduced Maverick, its first new full-flavor cigarette since Old Gold, making heavy use of free samples. Also, as part of its venture in alternative forms of advertising, early in the 1970s Lorillard tried advertising Kent and True in paperback books.

Lorillard stopped advertising Old Gold around 1975.

In the 2010s, the Old Gold non-filter variant was discontinued. Lorillard was acquired by the R.J. Reynolds Tobacco Company in 2015. While hard to find, Old Gold is still manufactured and available in the United States.

== Advertising ==
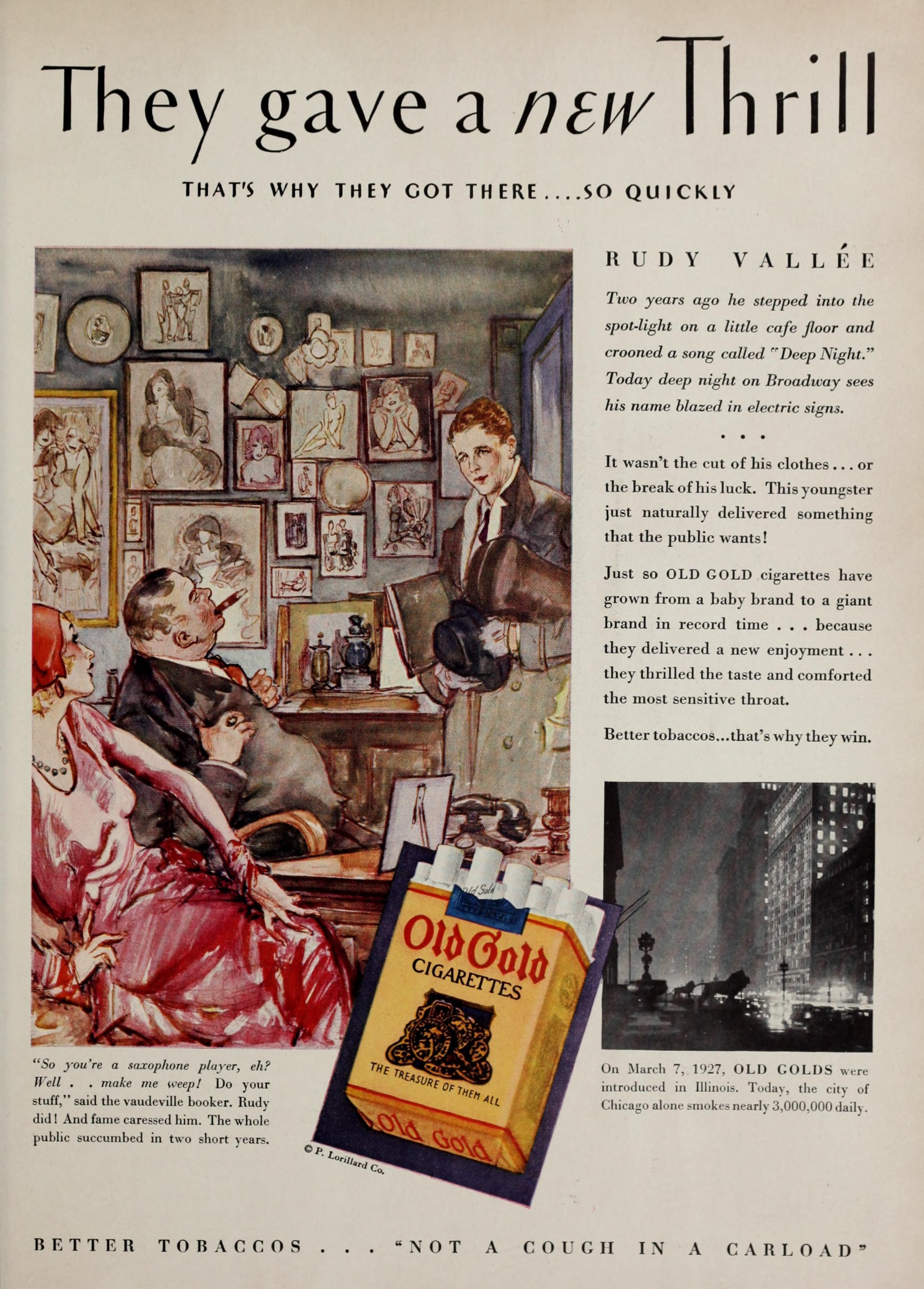
Ad for Old Gold cigarettes, featured in the September 1930 Motion Picture Magazine

Lorillard made many poster and magazine advertisements to promote the Old Gold brand, from the 1930s to the 1970s, when Lorillard stopped advertising the brand.

Besides poster and magazine adverts, TV advertisements were also made to promote the cigarettes, until the 1970s when TV advertisement was banned. The slogan often used in the later ads was "The cigarette for independent people".

In the 1920s, American professional baseball player Babe Ruth advertised Old Gold cigarettes. In one of the ads, Ruth is shown swinging his bat and giving his endorsement to Old Golds in a "blindfold test". In the blindfold test portion of the ad, he is quoted as saying: "Old Gold's mildness and smoothness marked it 'right off the bat' as the best", signed: "Babe Ruth".

In the 1950s, with studies suggesting that smoking may be linked with lung cancer, Lorillard introduced Halloween-themed adverts that tried to downplay the effects smoking has on one's health. The ads included slogans like "We don’t try to scare you with medical claims... Old Gold cures just one thing... The World’s Best Tobacco" and "Scare claims fool no one so... Trust Old Gold for a TREAT instead of a TREATMENT" to claim that the reports were false and that smoking was not harmful.

== Controversy ==
=== Old Gold and lower tar and nicotine ===
In July 1942, a complaint was made by the Federal Trade Commission against Lorillard because they made a claim in Reader's Digest that Old Gold cigarettes were lower in nicotine and throat-irritating tars and resins than other leading brands at the time. These health claims, however, were not substantiated and thus the FTC filed a complaint about misleading advertising towards Lorillard.

== Popular culture ==
=== Television ===
In the Mad Men episode "Smoke Gets in Your Eyes," Don Draper speaks with a waiter who says he favours Old Gold cigarettes. Draper himself is later seen smoking Old Gold Straights in Season 6.

== Cigarette camp ==
Camp Old Gold was one of the American Army camps established near Le Havre, France in World War II. As explained in "Introduction: The Cigarette Camps" at the website, The Cigarette Camps: The U.S. Army Camps in the Le Havre Area:

The staging-area camps were named after various brands of American cigarettes; the assembly area camps were named after American cities. The names of cigarettes and cities were chosen for two reasons: First, and primarily, for security. Referring to the camps without an indication of their geographical location went a long way to ensuring that the enemy would not know precisely where they were. Anybody eavesdropping or listening to radio traffic would think that cigarettes were being discussed or the camp was stateside, especially regarding the city camps. Secondly, there was a subtle psychological reason, the premise being that troops heading into battle wouldn't mind staying at a place where cigarettes must be plentiful and troops about to depart for combat would be somehow comforted in places with familiar names of cities back home (Camp Atlanta, Camp Baltimore, Camp New York, and Camp Pittsburgh, among others). By war's end, however, all of the cigarette and city camps were devoted to departees. Many processed liberated American POWs (Prisoners of War) and some even held German POWs for a while.

== See also ==
- Tobacco smoking
