= Lorillard Tobacco Company =

Tobacco firm

Lorillard, Inc.
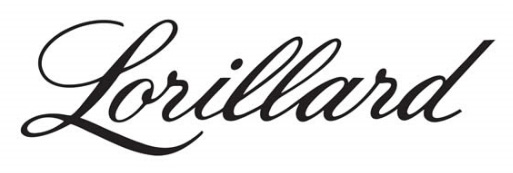
- Type: Public
- Industry: Tobacco
- Founded: 1760; 266 years ago
- Defunct: 2015; 11 years ago
- Fate: Purchased by Reynolds American in 2015
- Headquarters: Greensboro, North Carolina, U.S.
- Key people: Murray S. Kessler (chairman, president and CEO)
- Brands: List: Blue; Kent; Maverick; Max; Newport; Old Gold; Satin; True
- Revenue: ▲$6.46 billion USD (2011)
- Operating income: ▲$1.89 billion USD (2011)
- Net income: ▲$1.11 billion USD (2011)
- Number of employees: 3,000 (2013)

Lorillard Tobacco Company was an American tobacco company that marketed cigarettes under the brand names Newport, Maverick, Old Gold, Kent, True, Satin, and Max. The company had two operating segments: cigarettes and electronic cigarettes.

The company was purchased by Reynolds American, a company owned by British American Tobacco, in 2015, a deal that was announced in 2014.

== History ==
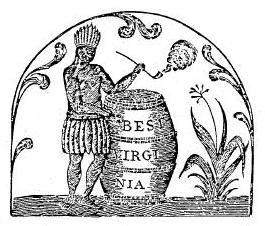
The Lorillard hogshead in 1789 featuring a Native American smoking

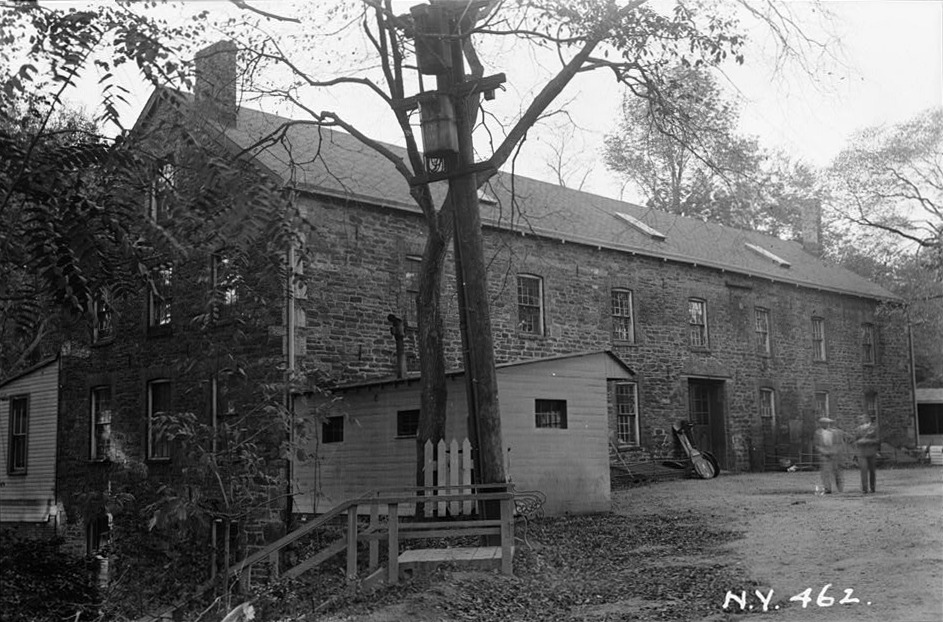
Lorillard Snuff Mill, built 1840, photo 1936

The company was founded by Pierre Abraham Lorillard in 1760. In 1899, the American Tobacco Company organized a New Jersey corporation called the Continental Tobacco Company, which took a controlling interest in many small tobacco companies. By 1910, James Buchanan Duke controlled Lorillard and the American Tobacco Company, even though Lorillard kept its original name. In 1911, the U.S. Court of Appeals found the American Tobacco Company "in restraint of trade" and issued a dissolution decree to the American Tobacco Company, which forced Lorillard to become an independent company again. In the same year, Lorillard purchased the Murad brand.

In 1925, Lorillard underwent a significant transition after Benjamin Lloyd Belt became president. Having been with the company since 1911, Belt made some decisions that made the company profitable. He began to prioritize promoting the Old Gold brand instead of Beech-Nut chewing tobacco, using such tactics as Old Gold on Broadway and sponsoring "Old Gold Presents Paul Whiteman and His Orchestra" which was a weekly hour-long show on Tuesdays nights over CBS from station WABC in New York. The Whiteman Hour had its first broadcast on February 5, 1929, and continued until May 6, 1930. When the Whiteman band went to Hollywood in mid-1929 to make the film King of Jazz, Old Gold leased a special eight-coach train to take Whiteman and his entourage to the West Coast. The train stopped at sixteen cities across the nation. Old Gold later sponsored Artie Shaw's Tuesday night "Melody and Madness" program on CBS Radio from November 20, 1938, until November 14, 1939. Belt was still president when he died in 1937.

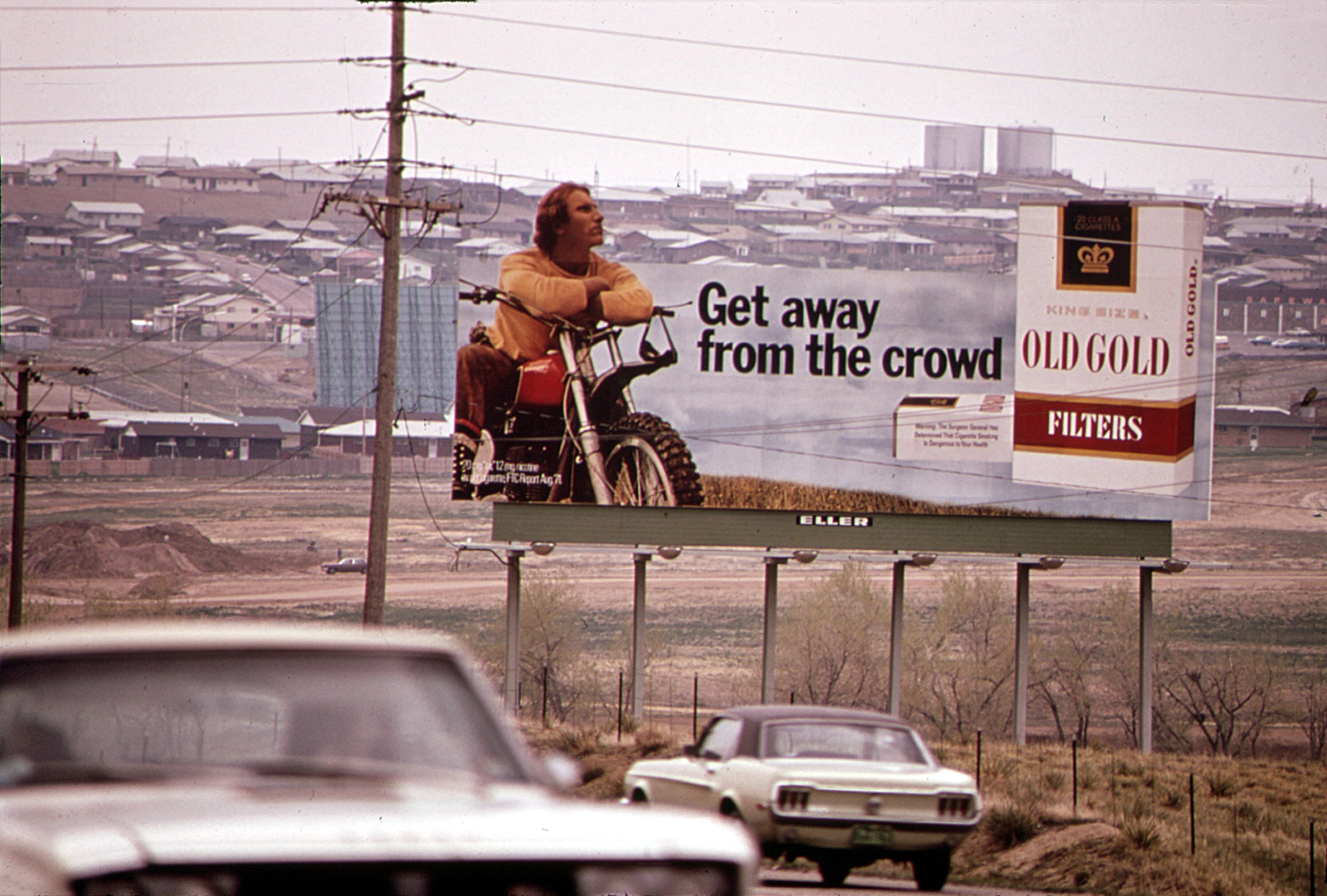
Billboard in Denver promoting Old Gold cigarettes (May 1972)

Lorillard Tobacco Company opened a new cigarette plant on East Market Street in Greensboro, North Carolina in 1956, moving cigarette manufacturing from Jersey City, New Jersey and Richmond, Virginia.

Between 1952 and 1956, the Lorillard 'Kent Micronite' brand used a crocidolite asbestos filter, made by the Hollingsworth & Vose company, which later resulted in millions of dollars being paid to the relatives of their employees and customers who had died, or who were dying, of cancer.

Loews Corporation purchased Lorillard in 1968.

Testifying under oath before Congress in 1994, Lorillard's CEO Andrew Tisch said that he did not believe that nicotine was addictive nor that cigarette smoking caused cancer.

In 1997, the firm's headquarters moved to Greensboro from New York City. The firm also manufactured cigarettes in Louisville, Kentucky.

In 1997, Lorillard was one of four entities to initiate negotiations leading to the 1998 Tobacco Master Settlement Agreement between "Big Tobacco" and 46 U.S. states.

Loews created the Carolina Group as a holding company for its tobacco assets in 2002; it proceeded to sell a minority stake in Carolina on the New York Stock Exchange. Loews controlled Carolina until May 10, 2006, when Loews Corporation sold 15 million shares of Carolina Group, lowering its holding from a controlling 53.7% to a plurality of 46.3%. The sale was valued at approximately $740 million.

In 2006, Lorillard was convicted of racketeering under RICO, along with Philip Morris and R. J. Reynolds Tobacco Company. The Supreme Court has upheld the verdict, in which Judge Kessler wrote,

[W]hat this case is really about ... is about an industry, and in particular these Defendants, that survives, and profits, from selling a highly addictive product which causes diseases that lead to a staggering number of deaths per year, an immeasurable amount of human suffering and economic loss, and a profound burden on our national health care system ... In short, Defendants have marketed and sold their lethal product with zeal, with deception, with a single-minded focus on their financial success, and without regard for the human tragedy or social costs that success exacted.

In 2008, Lorillard Tobacco entered into a separation agreement with its parent company Loews and became an independent publicly traded company.

To comply with FDA regulations, Lorillard had until June 22, 2010, to rebrand tobacco products marketed as "Lights", "Ultra-Lights", "Medium", "Mild", "Full Flavor", or similar designations to belie the false impression that some tobacco products are comparatively safe.

In December 2010, a Boston jury returned a $151 million verdict against Lorillard Tobacco Company for giving out free samples of cigarettes to children in urban housing projects in the 1950s. The plaintiff, Marie Evans, was nine when she first received these samples, according to documents filed by her attorneys. She died of lung cancer before the trial.

In 2014, after negotiations with People for the Ethical Treatment of Animals (PETA), Lorillard announced it would no longer test its products on animals. In a statement, the company said it "will use scientifically accepted or validated alternative test methods and technologies that avoid the use of animals. Such methods and tests may include in vitro cell culture tests, advanced chemistry tests and computer modeling programs."

=== Electronic cigarettes ===
In April 2012, Lorillard purchased privately held electronic cigarette company, blu eCigs, for $135 million in cash, marking the first foray by the tobacco industry into the electronic cigarette market. The electronic cigarette company had about $30 million in revenue in 2010, with blu eCigs sold in more than 13,000 retail outlets, including Walgreens and Sheetz.

In October 2013, Lorillard acquired UK e-cig company SKYCIG, which it later rebranded to blu ecigs UK.

=== Acquisition by Reynolds ===
In July 2014, Reynolds Tobacco Company agreed to buy Lorillard for $27.4 billion. The deal also included the divestiture of brands Kool, Winston, Maverick, Salem, and blu to Imperial Tobacco for $7.1 billion. The deal was finalized on June 12, 2015.

== Old Gold Cigarette Camp ==
Camp Old Gold was one of the American Army “Cigarette Camps” established near Le Havre, France, in World War II. As explained in "Introduction: The Cigarette Camps" at the Web site, The Cigarette Camps: The U.S. Army Camps in the Le Havre Area:

The staging-area camps were named after various brands of American cigarettes; the assembly area camps were named after American cities. The names of cigarettes and cities were chosen for two reasons: First, and primarily, for security. Referring to the camps without an indication of their geographical location went a long way to ensuring that the enemy would not know precisely where they were. Anybody eavesdropping or listening to radio traffic would think that cigarettes were being discussed or the camp was stateside, especially regarding the city camps. Secondly, there was a subtle psychological reason, the premise being that troops heading into battle wouldn't mind staying at a place where cigarettes must be plentiful and troops about to depart for combat would be somehow comforted in places with familiar names of cities back home (Camp Atlanta, Camp Baltimore, Camp New York, and Camp Pittsburgh, among others). By war's end, however, all of the cigarette and city camps were devoted to departees. Many processed liberated American POWs (Prisoners of War) and some even held German POWs for a while.

== Restatement ==
In May 2003, the company restated its financial statements in 2002 to reflect an adjustment to its historical accounting for CNA's investment in life settlement contracts and the related revenue recognition. On May 3, 2005, Loews Corp, the holding company of Carolina Group, announced to restate results for prior years to correct CNA's accounting for several reinsurance contracts.

== See also ==
- Cigarette#United States
- Lorillard Tobacco Co. v. Reilly, 533 U.S. 525 (2001)
- B. F. Good & Company Leaf Tobacco Warehouse
- David H. Miller Tobacco Warehouse
- 111 First Street
- Kananian v. Lorillard Tobacco Company
