= 111 First Street (film) =

111 First Street. From Paris to Jersey City, they showed no love.
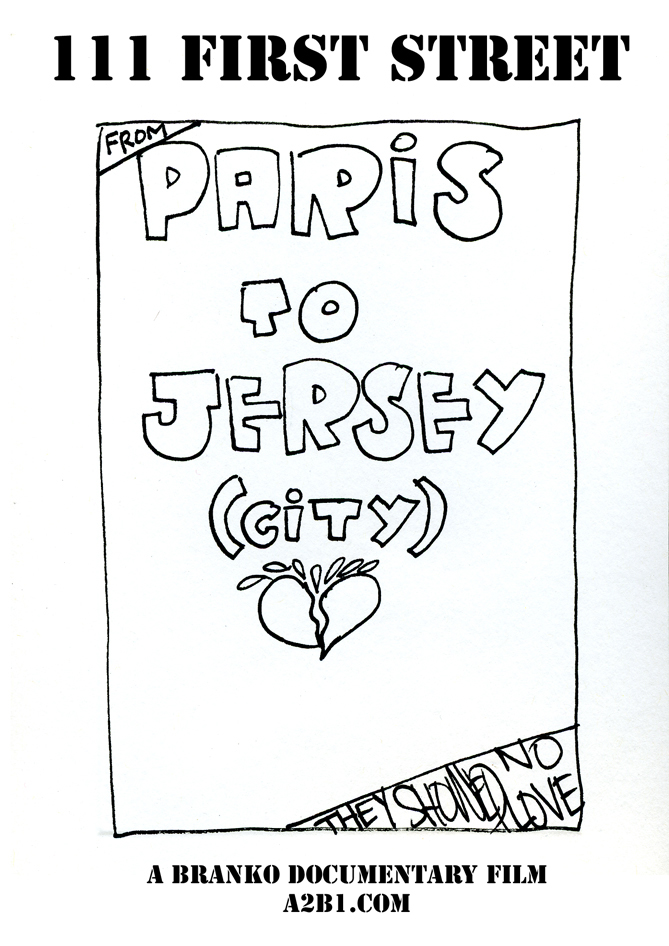
- Theatrical release poster by Nyugen Smith
- Directed by: Branko
- Starring: William Rodwell; Takafumi Shimuka; Faizulla Khamraev; Shaandor Hassan; Elizabeth Onorato; Charles Chamot; Kelly Darr; Tomomi Ono; Henry Sanchez; Kurt Von Ellers; Ana Velazquez; Minako Yoshino; Lisa Portnoff; Margo Pelletier; Lee Perry; Kit Sailer; Charles Farless; Jose Badosa; Mirea Gibert; Erdir Zat; Nancy Wells; Maggie Ens; Mike Smith; Norm Francoeur; Boris Arkady Kheyman; Kevin Mayer; Naomi Campbell; Edward Fausty; Domingos Fialho; Ron English; Marc Sloan; Barbara Sullivan; Paul Sullivan; Anastasia Zeleznaya; Jessica Lenard; Werner Bargsten; Kathe Frantz; Wei Jane Chir; Nicola Stemmer
- Cinematography: Branko
- Edited by: Branko
- Music by: Cesar Vuksic
- Release date: December 2012
- Running time: 133 minutes
- Country: United States
- Language: English

111 First Street. From Paris to Jersey City, they showed no love. is a 2012 documentary film, directed by Branko, starring some of the artists of an Art Center and residence located at 111 First Street, Jersey City, New Jersey. It is the fifth feature-length documentary film created by independent filmmaker Branko.

== Synopsis ==
111 First Street in Jersey City, New Jersey is the location of a proposed 52-story skyscraper. The former building housed on the site was a renovated warehouse that housed over 100 artists' studios, including painters, sculptors, photographers, musicians, filmmakers, writers, poets, and others. The concentration of artists led the building to be known as the "Heart of the Art Center". Although the building (and its occupants) are gone now, 111 First Street..., filmed before the demolition of the original building, documents this group of artists.

== Additional appearances ==
- American Watercolor Movement
- George Aviles, Esq.
- Maria Benjumeda
- Thomas A. deGise, Hudson County Executive
- Nayra de Souza
- Damn Glad
- Joelma, samba dancer
- Bernard Kenny, New Jersey State Senator
- Bill Kraus
- Manhattan Samba
- Tris McCall, music critic, pop musician, writer
- Bob Menendez, U.S. Senator
- Bret Schundler
- Teco, skating champion
- Cesar Vuksic, pianist
