= Let the Night Fall =

Studio album by Tris McCall
- Released: 2009
- Length: 44:11
- Label: Melody Lanes
- Producers: Jay Braun and Tris McCall

Tris McCall chronology
I'm Assuming You're All in Bands (2006)	Let the Night Fall (2009)

Professional ratings
Review scores
Source	Rating
AllMusic	4/5 stars

Let the Night Fall is the fourth solo album by Tris McCall, a music journalist, novelist, and rock musician from Hudson County, New Jersey. It was released in December 2009 on the Melody Lanes label.

== Songs and thematic notes ==
The album opens with "WFMU", a paean to college and independent radio that "builds from catchy trip-hop to a blazing chorus metaphorically loaded with unease, one rapidfire mot juste or double entendre after another."

The book Music: What Happened? cites the song "Battleships" as both political and romantic.

"You're Dead After School," according to McCall, was his only autobiographical song; as a student, McCall lost a role model, a teacher who was arrested for molesting a retarded child. At AllMusic, critic Paula Carino called the song both "sad and hilarious."

"Sugar Nobody Wants," in which the protagonist suggests breaking into an office supply store for the night, "endorses petty thievery and vandalism at a variety of unloved Jersey locations as a sort of what-the-hell morale booster for all concerned," in what the lyrics called "candy-assed forms of civil disobedience." McCall stated that the song was about "finding the cracks in the city that aren't mapped, or that used to be mapped and have fallen away as the legend has been rewritten, and making your stand there.... in the invisible spaces where the authorities don’t bother to look."

A music video for "Sugar Nobody Wants," created by McCall and producer Jay Braun, was released in April 2010.

== Critical reception ==
Music journalist Paula Carino described McCall as a "first-rate wordsmith" writing with a "nuanced, exasperated love for his home state", who "packs a novella's worth of keenly observed details into every song." Carino identified a consistent trend going back to McCall's "brilliant 1999 debut... highly melodic, piano-driven songs with intricate (but rocking) arrangements and insightful lyrics."

Lucid Culture called McCall an "unsurpassed" lyricist, likening him to Elvis Costello and Aimee Mann, and praising his differentiated use of sarcasm and irony in songs with a "defiant populism... often surprisingly cheery considering the underlying grimness." The San Diego Reader further described Let the Night Fall as "rich," and McCall as "mighty," stating "You don't have to be from Jersey. You just have to have ears."

== Track listing ==
All tracks are written by Tris McCall.

No.	Title	Length
1.	"WFMU"	3:04
2.	"The Throwaway"	2:01
3.	"The Ballad of Frank Vinieri"	4:19
4.	"Battleships"	3:00
5.	"Sugar Nobody Wants"	2:37
6.	"Let the Night Fall"	2:25
7.	"First World, Third Rate"	7:26
8.	"You're Dead After School"	3:52
9.	"Convenience Store Mozart"	1:13
10.	"Midnight (Now Approaching)"	5:33
11.	"Mountainside"	1:54
12.	"We Could Be the Killers"	2:36
13.	"Sunrise, Rte. 7"	4:11
