= Shootout at the Sugar Factory =

Studio album by Tris McCall
- Released: 2003
- Length: 33:55
- Label: Melody Lanes
- Producers: Jay Braun and Tris McCall

Tris McCall chronology
If One of These Bottles Should Happen to Fall (1999)	Shootout at the Sugar Factory (2003)	I'm Assuming You're All in Bands (2006)

Shootout at the Sugar Factory, released in 2003, is the second solo album by Tris McCall, a music journalist, novelist, and rock musician from Hudson County, New Jersey.

== Production and thematic notes ==
Shootout at the Sugar Factory was Tris McCall's follow-up album to If One of These Bottles Should Happen to Fall (1999), which had established the prominence of New Jersey life and politics in McCall's songwriting.

The album was co-produced by Jay Braun of the Negatones, of whom McCall stated, "I don't think he was interested in telling a coherent story about my experiences in Hudson County. He was looking for certain musical virtues, a certain rock ferocity."

In contrast with the desired impression of ferocity, Brooklyn music journalist Michele De Meglio categorized Shootout as "an ode to bubblegum pop infused with the musician's synthpunk" in "a record completely focused on the art and architecture of New York and New Jersey." McCall told De Meglio, "All these songs are about how much I love built environments. It's love songs sung to the city, roads, highways, and the plastic face of public culture."

In 2004, McCall told Chorus & Verse that the "most polemical" songs were the last ones added, adding that without the "full force" of argumentative lyrics on urban decay, he would have run an unacceptable "risk of being inscrutable to the casual listener." Making explicit the connections among the songs in Shootout, McCall called it "an album about public culture and the fragility of urban spaces."

== Songs ==
Shootout opened with the "apocalyptic farewell" of an overqualified toll collector in "Scatter My Ashes on the New Jersey Turnpike". In the music magazine Delusions of Adequacy, Justin Vellucci's review called Shootout a "frighteningly addictive mix of synthetic pop soundscapes, club-ready electronica, and quirky rock freakouts":

There's a lot on display here, from disco-tinged funk exercises ("Dancing to Architecture," "Go Back to West New York") and AOR-friendly electro-pop ("A Commuter's Prayer") to Devo-inspired rock insanity ("The Man From Nantucket," "The Night Bus"), Latin-influenced fare ("Robert Menendez Basta Ya!"), and quirky musical moral lessons ("Another Public Service Announcement"). McCall and company manage to carry the torch notably on each of the record's self-described "musical impressions" of Hudson County, showing a willingness to play with the light-hearted side of the material — as well as the genres they're referencing — while still taking it seriously as artistic content.

== Critical reception ==
Vellucci's review concluded that "despite being grounded in some odd footings", the music on Shootout "ages and grows well with each passing listen."

In The Record, music critic Barry Gramlich cited the album for its "cheeky lyrics" and "sardonic wit," writing that McCall's work "could be juxtaposed next to the opening-credit scenes of The Sopranos."

== Track listing ==
All tracks are written by Tris McCall.

No.	Title	Length
1.	"Scatter My Ashes on the New Jersey Turnpike"	2:46
2.	"Dancing to Architecture"	3:05
3.	"Machines to Make You Feel Good"	2:16
4.	"Go Back to West New York"	5:04
5.	"A Commuter's Prayer"	3:28
6.	"The Man from Nantucket"	4:13
7.	"The Night Bus"	2:45
8.	"This Is Another Public Service Announcement"	3:31
9.	"Robert Menendez Basta Ya!"	2:58
10.	"Philos2K3"	3:38
