= 111 First Street =

Skyscraper in Jersey City, New Jersey

- Interactive map of the 111 First Street area

General information
- Status: Approved
- Coordinates: 40.7208°N 74.0375°W

Technical details
- Floor count: 52

Design and construction
- Architect: Rem Koolhaas

111 First Street was an industrial building in Jersey City, New Jersey, at the intersection of First and Washington Streets in Downtown Jersey City. Prior to its demolition in 2007, the 19th-century industrial building on the site had been converted to an arts center, artists' residence, and loft. As of 2018, the site is the location of a proposed 52-story skyscraper.

== Original building ==
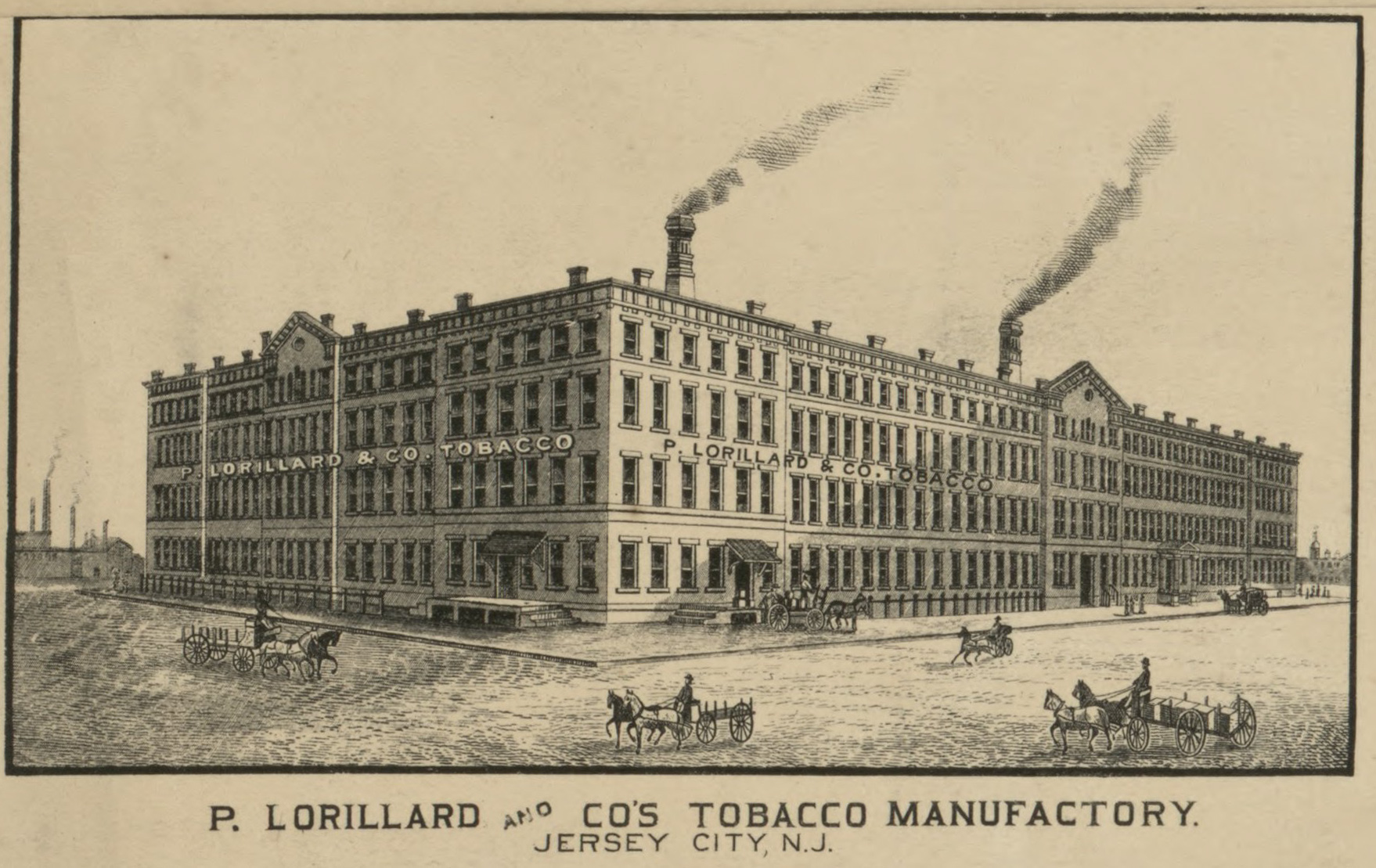
1879 engraving of the Lorillard Tobacco Manufactory at 111 First Street

=== Construction and industrial use ===
The original industrial building, constructed in 1866, was a Greek Revival brick building fronting on Washington Street that housed one of the nation's first conglomerates, the American Screw Company. It was purchased in the early 1870s by P. Lorillard & Co., and for about 85 years it was a factory and warehouse of the Lorillard Tobacco Company.

In 1956, Lorillard moved its manufacturing operations out of Jersey City, and in the ensuing decades, a variety of other businesses used the building for purposes including light manufacturing, retail space, and storage.

=== Arts center ===
In the late 1980s, the warehouse was renovated after years of abandonment, and began to be shared by industrial tenants and artists. The building became known as an arts center, with galleries, studios, residences, and lofts that housed over 200 artists, including painters, sculptors, photographers, musicians, filmmakers, writers, and poets. The building's neighborhood, redeveloped as the Historic Warehouse District, was initially dubbed WALDO (Work And Live District Overlay), but soon became known as the Powerhouse Arts District.

In the spring of 2005, the artists and other tenants were evicted in a dispute with developer Lloyd Goldman, and the building was demolished in 2007.

=== Legacy ===
The building and its artists were the subject of a 2012 documentary film, 111 First Street, directed by independent filmmaker Branko (Raul Romero), and largely filmed prior to the building's demolition. The documentary, subtitled From Paris to Jersey City, They Showed No Love, included interviews with artists and political figures.

In 2017, twelve years after their eviction, more than 40 of the building's artists reunited to display their work in an exhibition called "111 1st Street: A Community of Artists."

== Proposed skyscraper ==
The approved new building is a 52-story skyscraper to be built in the Powerhouse Arts District of Jersey City. The mixed-use building is to include residences, a hotel, and retail space, as well as planned artist lofts and gallery space. Under the owner's preliminary agreement with the city that permitted demolition of the building, the facade is to be reconstructed using the previously existing brick.

Rem Koolhaas of the Office for Metropolitan Architecture (OMA), an architectural firm based in the Netherlands, was announced as the project's architect on September 18, 2006. It is divided into three vertical rectangular sections, at 90 degree angles to one another, overhanging the building's base. According to the architects:

Each component of the [mixed-use] program is ... concentrated into individual blocks – a cube of artist work/live studios and galleries, a slab that combines hotel rooms and apartments, and a wider slab that accommodates deeper apartment units. The resulting volumes are stacked perpendicularly in plan to create a 52 story (592ft) tower. The stacking maintains the independence of each block, optimizes views from the site and creates a dynamic relationship between the building and its surroundings: spectacle from convention.

== See also ==
- List of tallest buildings in Jersey City
