= Kananian v. Lorillard Tobacco Company =

Kananian v. Lorillard was an important case in asbestos litigation.

Kananian was a World War II veteran. Kananian sued Lorillard Tobacco Company after making numerous claims against asbestos bankruptcy trusts. Lorillard was often the target of such litigation because it sold cigarettes with filters that contained asbestos in the 1950s.

A judge removed the firm Brayton Purcell from the Kananian asbestos case Lorillard Tobacco for making false statements. The judge ruled that Brayton Purcell deliberately misled him by vouching for filings made with trusts for Johns Mansville and other firms; these filings falsely stated that Kananian worked in trades that exposed him to their products. The judge described the misconduct as an "endless web of deceit."

Kananian died of mesothelioma on June 24, 2000. He was a resident of Broadview Heights, Ohio.
