= My Teenage Stride =

- Origin: Brooklyn, NY, United States
- Genres: Indie pop
- Years active: 2003–present
- Labels: Becalmed Records
- Members: Jedediah Smith; Edd Chitenden; John Grewell
- Past members: Brett Whitmoyer (drums); Tris McCall (synthesizers); Jenny Logan (bass guitar); Jeff Ciprioni (guitar); Mat Patalano (bass); Dakkan Abbe (guitar); Michael Hollitscher (bass); Patrick Shea (piano, synth)
- Website: myteenagestride.bandcamp.com

My Teenage Stride is a band from Brooklyn, New York, with influences including The Smiths and The Jesus and Mary Chain. They have released four albums since 2004.

== History ==
My Teenage Stride (or "MTS") started in 2003 as "the bedroom/hallway/basement recording project of Jedediah Smith," providing a band identity for Smith's multi-instrumental solo recordings. Over the years, the group has consisted of Jedediah Smith and a shifting cast of band members.

Smith grew up in the rural Western Massachusetts town of Colrain, learning piano, guitar, bass and drums as a teenager. As Smith described it, "My grandmother was a stride piano player, Jelly Roll Morton-style... She almost went professional, but because she was a woman in the '20s I don't think she felt she'd be able to go all the way with it. My mom started singing jazz after she turned 40, and my dad had an incredible record collection."

The first My Teenage Stride album, A Sad Cloud, was released on the Banazan label in 2004, followed the following year by Major Major on Becalmed Records.

Smith recruited Michael Hollitscher on bass, Brett Whitmoyer on drums, Tris McCall on synthesizer, and Dakkan Abbe on guitar; this line-up recorded part of the third album, 2007's Ears Like Golden Bats, though much of the album consisted of Smith still playing every instrument.

Ears Like Golden Bats was described by eMusic.com as "one of the year's most thrilling surprises, an album that wraps wry gallows humor in glistening guitars and whistling synths." The review continued:

Lyrically, Smith is a gleeful malcontent. The first words on the record are "God bless the criminal," and its remainder is filled with tales of sad sacks and pessimists who never built a bridge they wouldn't burn. "Reversal," a canny re-write of the Chills '"Pink Frost," is one long festival of denial, Smith grimly intoning: "When you feel alright/ reversal!/ when you sail alright/ reversal!"

In 2008, the group self-released an EP called Lesser Demons, and in December 2008, recorded a festive tune for the Christmas compilation 'An Indiecater Christmas' released by Indiecater Records.

My Teenage Stride undertook to release a single each month in 2009, with releases on eMusic.com that included some b-sides and two EPs.

As of 2010, My Teenage Stride was a trio with Smith, Edd Chitenden, and John Grewell. They released a set of five songs, recorded earlier in 2010 by Smith alone, on WFMU's Free Music Archive.

In early 2010, the group solicited funding on Kickstarter for a new album, citing a plan to work with producer/musician Marc Kramer (of Butthole Surfers, Galaxie 500, and Bongwater).

== Discography ==
=== Albums ===
- A Sad Cloud (2004) Banazan
- Major Major (March 2005) Becalmed
- Ears Like Golden Bats (February 2007) Becalmed
- Lesser Demons (2008) self-released

=== Singles ===
- "Blackbeard's Ghost" Banazan
- I'm Sorry EP Becalmed
- Cast Your Own Shadow(November 2008) Self Released
- Gallipoli Now (March 2009) Self Released
- Creep Academy (February 2009) EP Self Released
- Heart Shackles (May 2009) Mitsukurina Owstoni
- Some Bullets Are Dreams Midsummer EP (July 2009) Mitsukurina Owstoni
- King of the Holidays (Dec. 2012) Neotomic Records
