= B. F. Good & Company Leaf Tobacco Warehouse =

- B.F. Good & Company Leaf Tobacco Warehouse
- U.S. National Register of Historic Places
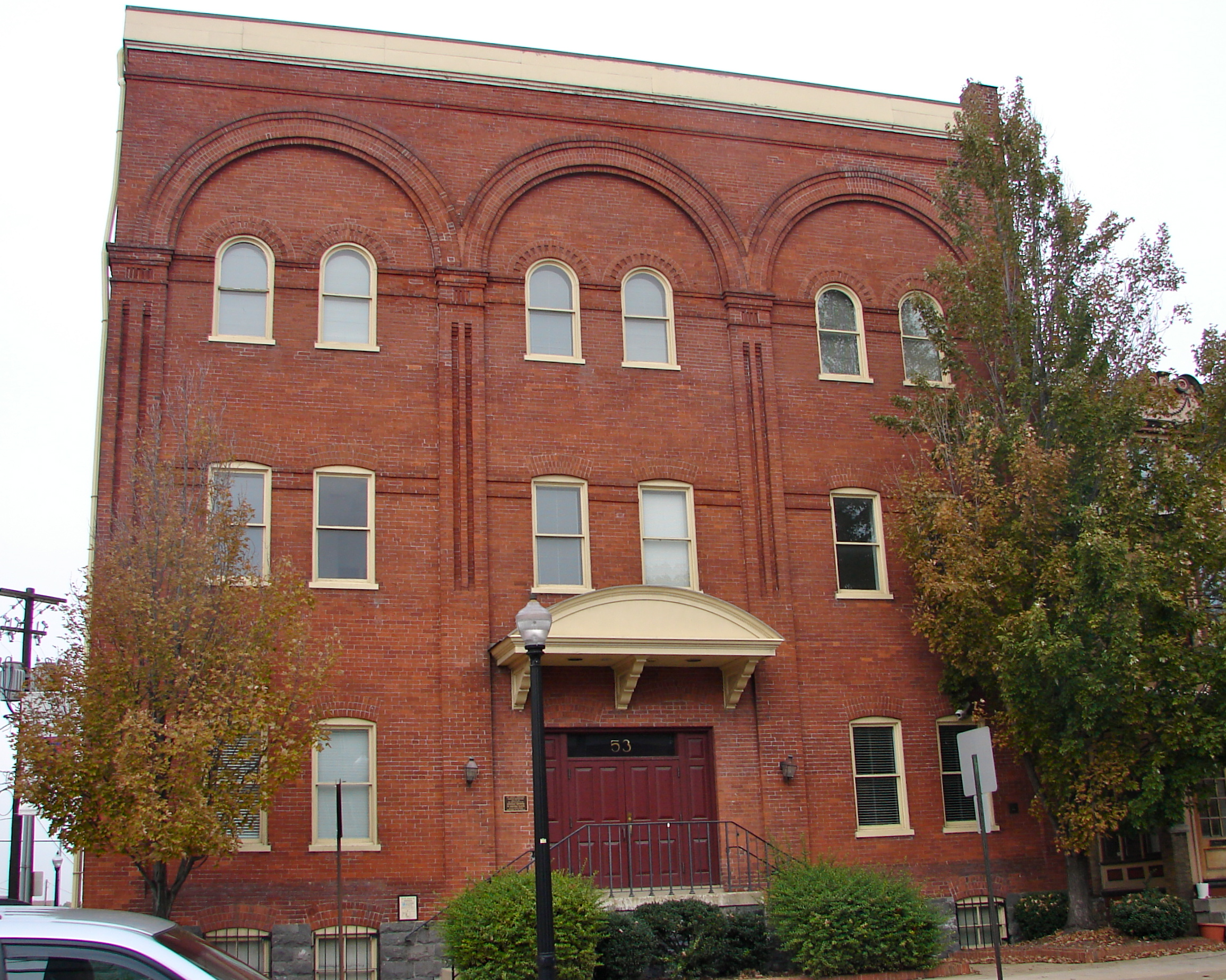
- B.F. Good & Company Leaf Tobacco Warehouse, October 2010

- Location within Pennsylvania Location within the United States
- Location: 49–53 W. James St., Lancaster, Pennsylvania
- Coordinates: 40°2′9″N 76°18′31″W
- Area: 0.1 acres (0.040 ha)
- Built: 1899–1900
- Architectural style: Beaux Arts
- NRHP reference No.: 85000035
- Added to NRHP: January 3, 1985

The B.F. Good & Company Leaf Tobacco Warehouse, also known as the P. Lorillard Company Tobacco Warehouse, is an historic tobacco warehouse which is located in Lancaster, Lancaster County, Pennsylvania.

It was listed on the National Register of Historic Places in 1985.

== History and architectural features ==
Built between 1899 and 1900, this historic warehouse is a three-and-one-half-story, rectangular, brick building that was designed in the Beaux-Arts style. It sits on a high foundation of gray limestone. The Lorillard Tobacco Company purchased the building in 1920.

The building is now home to RGS Associates and the Lancaster office of BrandYourself.
