= Ears Like Golden Bats =

Studio album by My Teenage Stride
- Released: February 20, 2007
- Genre: Indie pop
- Length: 37:08
- Label: Becalmed Records
- Producer: Jedediah Smith

My Teenage Stride chronology
Major Major (2005)	Ears Like Golden Bats (2007)

Professional ratings
Review scores
Source	Rating
Allmusic	3.5/5 stars

Ears Like Golden Bats is the third album by My Teenage Stride. Lawrence Lui of CokemachineGlow.com gave it a 69% rating, stating "taking C86 pastoralism and refracting it through the prism of ‘90s lo-fi Amer-indie, Ears Like Golden Bats projects a treble-happy modesty that can be at once charming and cloying". Jennifer Kelly of PopMatters described it as "wonderful stuff". Alistair Fitchett, in Tangents, described it as "one of the finer albums of the year". Magnet featured it in its top 20 albums of 2008 list, and it has appeared on many top 10, 20, and 100 album and song lists in the blogosphere.

== Track listing ==
All songs written by Jedediah Smith.

1. "Reception" – 2:11
2. "That Should Stand for Something" – 2:20
3. "To Live and Die in the Airport Lounge" – 3:43
4. "Actors' Colony" – 1:35
5. "Ears Like Golden Bats" – 2:20
6. "The Genie of New Jersey" – 2:47
7. "Terror Bends" – 2:40
8. "Reversal" – 2:48
9. "Chock's Rally" – 2:24
10. "Heartless & Cruel" – 2:17
11. "Ruin" – 2:53
12. "We'll Meet at Emily's" – 2:59
13. "Depression Kicks" – 3:23
14. "Boys Will Tell" – 3:31
