= David H. Miller Tobacco Warehouse =

- U.S. National Register of Historic Places
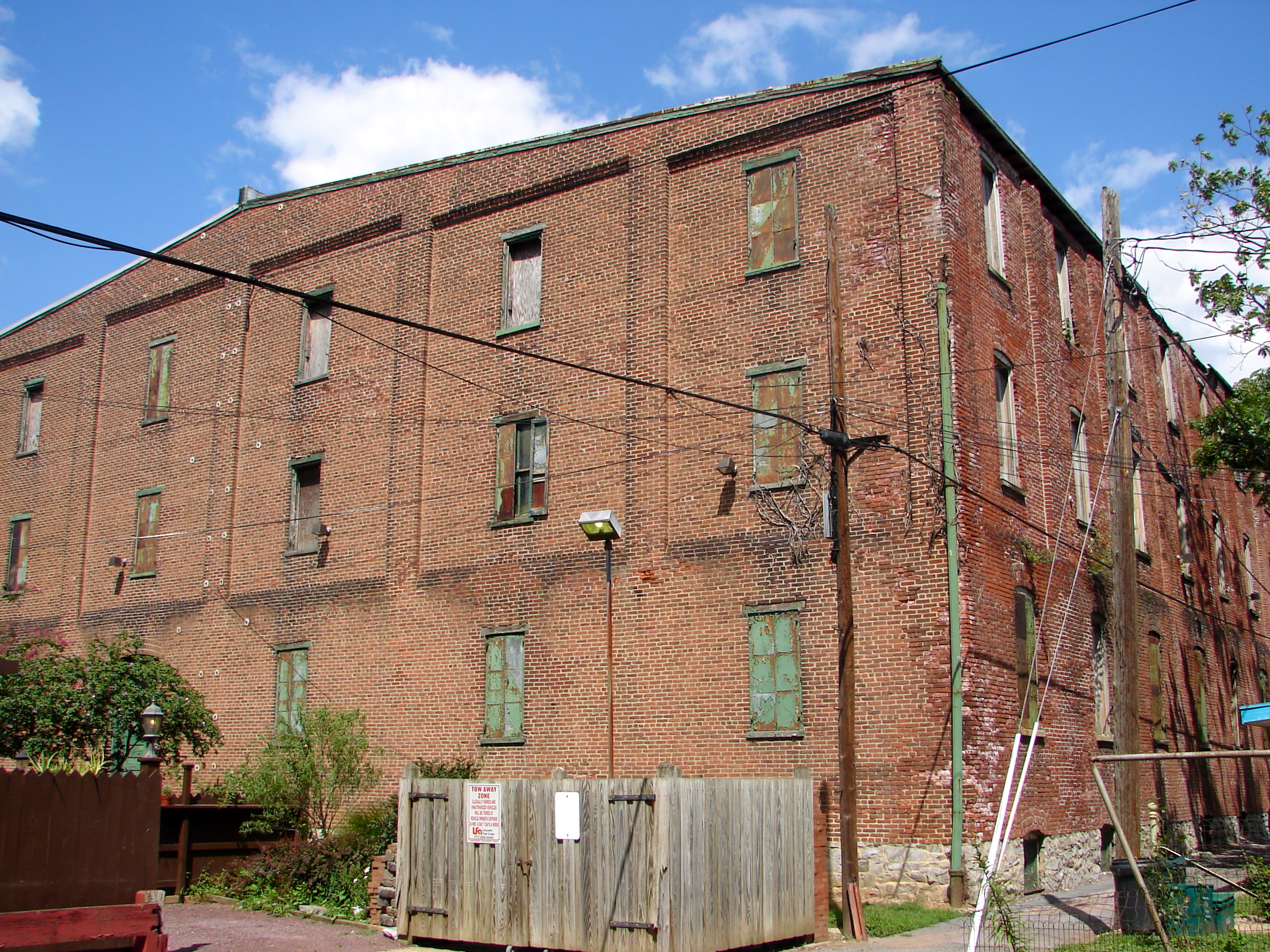
- Miller Tobacco Warehouse, August 2011

- Location within Pennsylvania Location within the United States
- Location: 512 N. Market St., Lancaster, Pennsylvania
- Coordinates: 40°2′47″N 76°17′50″W
- Area: less than one acre
- Built: 1900
- MPS: Tobacco Buildings in Lancaster City MPS
- NRHP reference No.: 90001407
- Added to NRHP: September 21, 1990

David H. Miller Tobacco Warehouse is a historic tobacco warehouse located at Lancaster, Lancaster County, Pennsylvania. It was built in 1900, and is a three-story, rectangular red brick building on a stone foundation. It is six bays by nine bays and has a slightly pitched gable roof. It housed local tobacco companies until occupied by the Lorillard Tobacco Company after 1938.

It was listed on the National Register of Historic Places in 1990.
