= If One of These Bottles Should Happen to Fall =

Studio album by Tris McCall
- Released: 1999
- Genres: Indie pop, power pop
- Length: 46:38
- Producer: Scott Miller

Tris McCall chronology
If One of These Bottles Should Happen to Fall (1999)	Shootout at the Sugar Factory (2003)

If One of These Bottles Should Happen to Fall is the 1999 debut solo album by Tris McCall, a music journalist, novelist, and rock musician from Hudson County, New Jersey.

== Production and thematic notes ==
If One of These Bottles Should Happen to Fall, released in 1999, was produced and mixed by Scott Miller, a California pop musician who led the groups Game Theory and The Loud Family, and who was McCall's "musical hero" until Miller's death in 2013. According to McCall, "Some of the basics were tracked in New York, but most of the recording was done in his San Bruno, California living room. He was extremely generous with his time, his insight, and his guidance".

McCall credited David Schreiber (guitar, bass guitar), who accompanied McCall on trips to the San Francisco Bay Area to make the record, as his "principal collaborator during these sessions."

According to McCall, "While the tone of the album is lighthearted, a few of the heavier themes that would later obsess me are apparent here: geography as destiny, gentrification, the pathos of the politician, capitalist activity as a glorified gambling addiction, distaste for drugs and alcohol, long looks askance at the big city across the Hudson."

While selecting songs from McCall's demos, Miller drew McCall toward the "conceptual unity" of a set of songs centering on the political, emotional, and civic life of New Jersey. Describing the prominence of New Jersey life and politics in McCall's songwriting, The New York Times wrote, "Mr. McCall's songs are the opposite of a Jersey joke. In his songs, New Jersey is the center of the world, without apology."

McCall described his musical attitude as "the Jersey way; we wear our hearts on our sleeves... I'm trying to tap into the way that civic and public life makes me feel and the way it makes other people feel," resulting in what the New York Times described as CDs "informed at their core by a sense of intense Jersey-tude." According to The Brooklyn Rail, McCall's strength is social commentary: in contrast to Bruce Springsteen's "boardwalks, arcades, and cheap little seaside bars," McCall offers "an alternative New Jersey mythology, which is more urban, urbane, and ironic, than Springsteen's, but no less captivating."

== Songs ==
McCall opened the 1999 CD with "The New Jersey Department of Public Works," a song about "an imaginary but incredibly noble state agency." In the song, McCall set out to create "a gauzily-remembered fictional New Deal-type program, representing the kind of togetherness and industrial positivism that we imagine the 1930s and 1940s were like. It's an imaginary echo of an imaginary government department, one that unified state residents through collective building projects. It's supposed to sound like a dimly-remembered ideal, a dream of political and social cohesion achieved through identification with the state."

McCall stated that the first two songs served as a "double intro," with "The New Jersey Department of Public Works" and "Janie Abstract" representing "New Jersey as I might have dreamt it, followed by New Jersey as I actually see it." In contrast to the opening track, "Janie Abstract" depicted present-day "strip highways and commercial retrofitting of old retail establishments, class conflict, fragmentation, the haves and have-nots of modern technology, misrepresentation and aggressive development plans, postmodernity."

"The View from New Jersey" depicts a woman downsized from her job and "forced to move from Manhattan to Hoboken," who "equates her rejection by the corporate machine and exile with personal failure." McCall's sincere narrator, in a sort of therapeutic counseling, seems to suggest that "New Jersey offers opportunities for self-reinvention ... autonomy and self-governance," and before he's through, "she's glad she stayed.... It's a song that encourages listeners to bear the pain of estrangement from mainstream values."

Many of McCall's songs contain references to New Jersey politicians; examples include "Dear Governor Kean" and a litany of names mentioned in "It's Not The Money, It's The Principle." A glossary identifying the names of Hudson County politicians and local haunts was included with the If One of These Bottles CD.

== Critical reception ==
Music critic Joe Harrington, in his 2002 book Sonic Cool: The Life & Death of Rock 'n' Roll, called If One of These Bottles "the best Elvis Costello album since Armed Forces", and cited McCall as a "master of the same kind of intricate wordplay as Dylan and Costello." Harrington added that McCall's "self-deprecating manner" and his "jovial, and thus more philosophically insightful" approach to songwriting and performance "upsets people's notions about what a 'folk' singer constitutes," as did the early Bob Dylan.

The Brooklyn Rail, which cited "social commentary" as McCall's forte, wrote that "The View from New Jersey" is not only the album's "most memorable" song, but "may be the greatest New Jersey rock song since Springsteen's 'Thunder Road'. But whereas the Boss's song was all about leaving New Jersey ... McCall's song is about settling down." The reviewer added that McCall also writes "touching, if sardonic, love songs", to the point that "Missing You" nearly "seems to be channeling Cole Porter".

== Track listing ==
All tracks are written by Tris McCall (except as noted).

No.	Title	Tagline	Length
1.	"The New Jersey Department of Public Works"	Working together / Insuring our future	1:53
2.	"Janie Abstract"	Blind ride through West New York on liar's holiday.	2:36
3.	"Mad About Us"	Well the rain pours down on everyone	2:25
4.	"A Girl With a Gun"	I'll do whatever you want / Just don't hurt the kids / Because they're innocent	3:25
5.	"Dear Governor Kean" (lyrics by Elizabeth Post)	No words, no flesh, his flag's done wove	1:56
6.	"Had Too Much Sugar"	Nothing wrong with us we can't fix in the schoolyard	2:24
7.	"The View from New Jersey"	They're all waiting for their real lives to begin	5:39
8.	"I Am the Law (In The Ointment)" (orig. titled "The Miseducation of Tris McCall")	Who counts the cops on Grove Street?	0:58
9.	"Lite Radio Is My Kryptonite"	Why not fill your days with joy?	3:35
10.	"Missing You"	And I wonder who you're kissing while I'm missing you	2:40
11.	"I Can't Get Up Out of My Chair"	I do try to be small and demure	2:20
12.	"LOL"		2:58
13.	"He's a Sagittarius"	So we learn to move with the utmost unction	2:18
14.	"Fire, Fire"	There is no hell, no hell to my Deſire / For all ye Rivers backward Flye	2:48
15.	"The Popularity Contest"	All alone out on Times Square / Watching the tape go by	4:00
16.	"It's Not the Money, It's the Principle" (form taken from Q-Tip's outro on "Verses from the Abstract")	Everybody in the state / You don't stop	0:56
17.	"Hung by a Jury of My Peers"	Right when you're trying to make sense of it all	3:42

== Personnel ==
McCall provided lead vocals and played synthesizer. Other musicians appearing on the album included Jens Carstensen on drums, David Schreiber on guitar and bass guitar, Martin Nienstedt on bass guitar, Dan Madinabeitia on piano, and Rachel Fishman and Regan Solmo on vocals.
