= True (cigarette) =

American brand of cigarettes

- Old logo of True cigarettes
- Product type: Cigarette
- Current owner: Reynolds American
- Produced by: R.J. Reynolds
- Country: United States
- Introduced: September 1966; 60 years ago
- Related brands: Kent, Pall Mall
- Markets: United States
- Previous owners: Lorillard (1966–2015)
- Tagline: "Shouldn't your brand be True?"

True is an American brand of cigarettes, currently owned by Reynolds American and manufactured through its subsidiary R.J. Reynolds. The brand was created and formerly owned by the Lorillard Tobacco Company.

== History ==
True was introduced in September 1966 by Lorillard in 10 major U.S. markets, with national distribution beginning on November 1, 1966. The tagline for the new brand was "Shouldn't your brand be True?". The cigarette, when first introduced, was full flavored. It was later available in a reduced tar and nicotine version during the 1970s and 1980s. During that time, True deceptively targeted people who wanted to quit smoking ("Considering All I'd Heard, I decided To Either Quit Or Smoke True. I Smoke True.").

True cigarettes, like Parliament cigarettes, have a recessed filter. However, whereas Parliaments have nothing in the recessed space, Trues have a plastic piece (round with a triangle in the middle and radials which extend to the outside) which prevents the top of the cigarette from being broken, torn, or crushed.

In 2015, Reynolds American acquired the brand after they bought the Lorillard Tobacco Company.

== Advertising ==
Pack of True cigarettes

Lorillard made various poster advertisements to promote the True brand as a "low tar, low nicotine" brand.

A few TV ads were also made to promote the brand in the late 1960s to early 1970s.

== Varieties ==
- Filters Kings: Soft Pack, Box
- Filters 100s: Soft Pack, Box
- Menthol Kings: Soft Pack, Box
- Menthol 100s: Soft Pack, Box

== See also ==
- Tobacco smoking
