= Powerhouse Arts District =

Historic district in Hudson County, New Jersey, US

Coordinates: 40.7199°N 74.0389°W

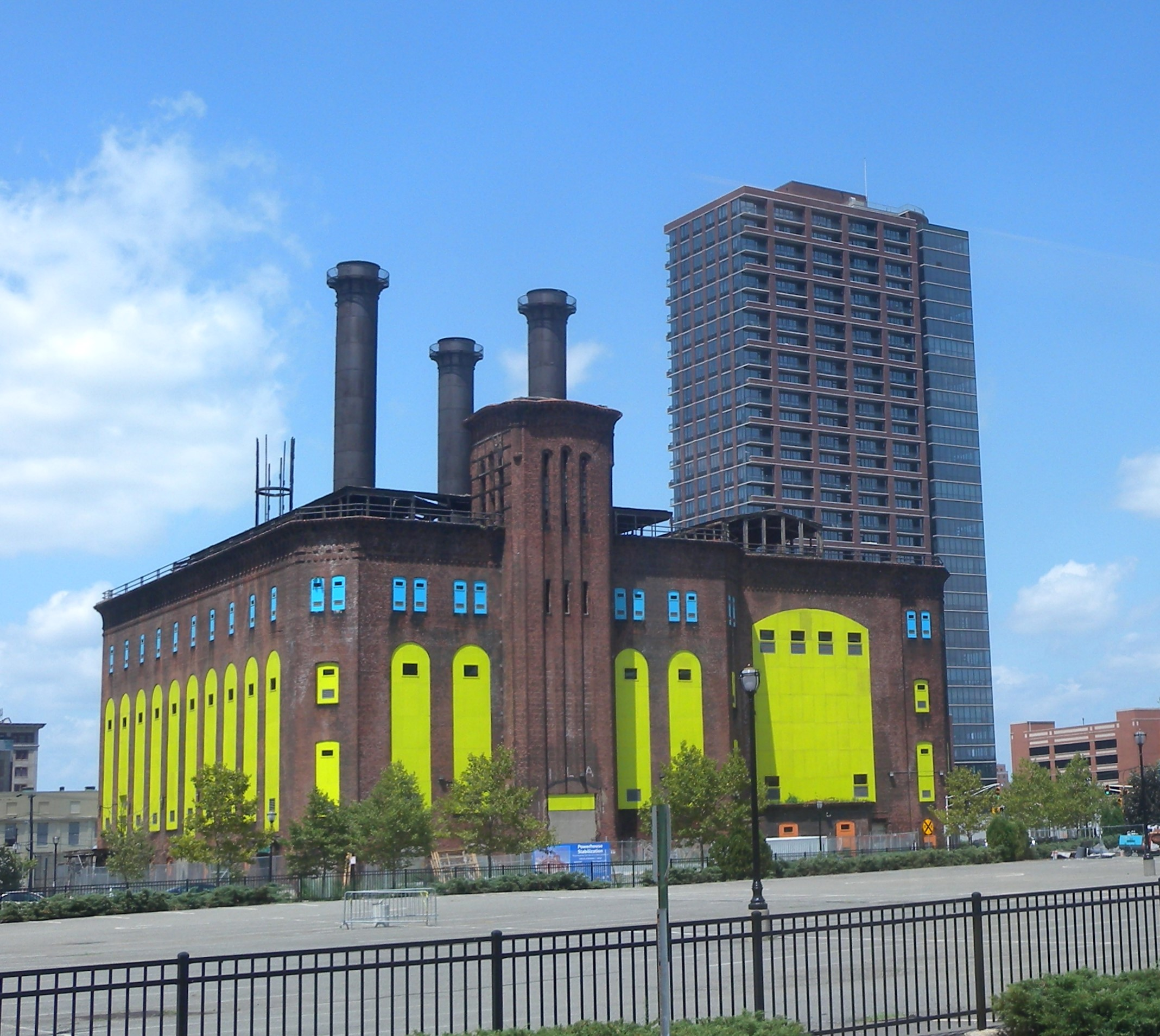
The Powerhouse

The Powerhouse Arts District is a historic warehouse district in Downtown Jersey City, New Jersey, United States, on the water front of the Hudson River. Its name derives from the unused generating station Hudson and Manhattan Railroad Powerhouse, a historic Victorian-era power plant that was renovated into an arts center. The area was once home to large industrial operations, which gradually left the district during the 20th century, leaving large derelict buildings that attracted artists drawn to the large, affordable loft spaces.

== WALDO and PAD ==
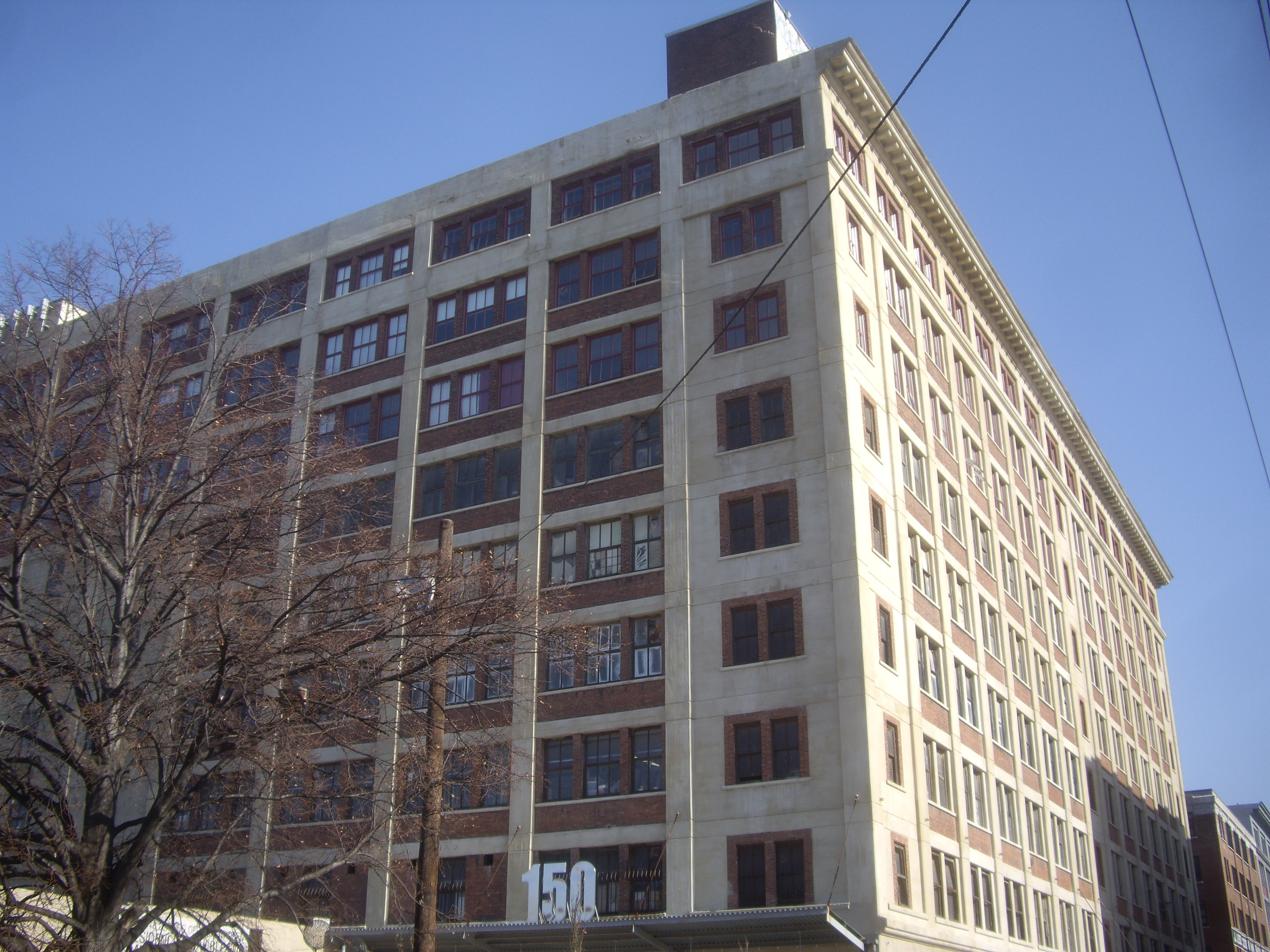
The A & P Warehouse

Most of the proposals for retail and gallery space never materialized or found tenants, and as a result the eight blocks of industrial buildings remain much the same as in 2002 when the district began. As well, the city approved new zoning for a large development on First Street which deviated from the district plan. New zoning was proposed for several other blocks. Most proposed developments were higher rise structures, and the majority of capital investment in the district favors high rise development. These factors led to WALDO (Work And Live District Overlay) being removed from the zoning ordinance.

== Arts Organizations & Artists ==
- Art House Productions
- NJ Symphony
- 150 Bay Street (ProArts, Arts 14C, studio spaces, etc.)
- Nimbus Dance
- Exchange Place Alliance "Art Walk"
- Novado Gallery
- Washington Arts Center/The Ice House

== See also ==
- 111 First Street (film)
- Hudson and Manhattan Railroad Powerhouse
- List of neighborhoods in Jersey City, New Jersey
- National Register of Historic Places listings in Hudson County, New Jersey
